= List of sourdough breads =

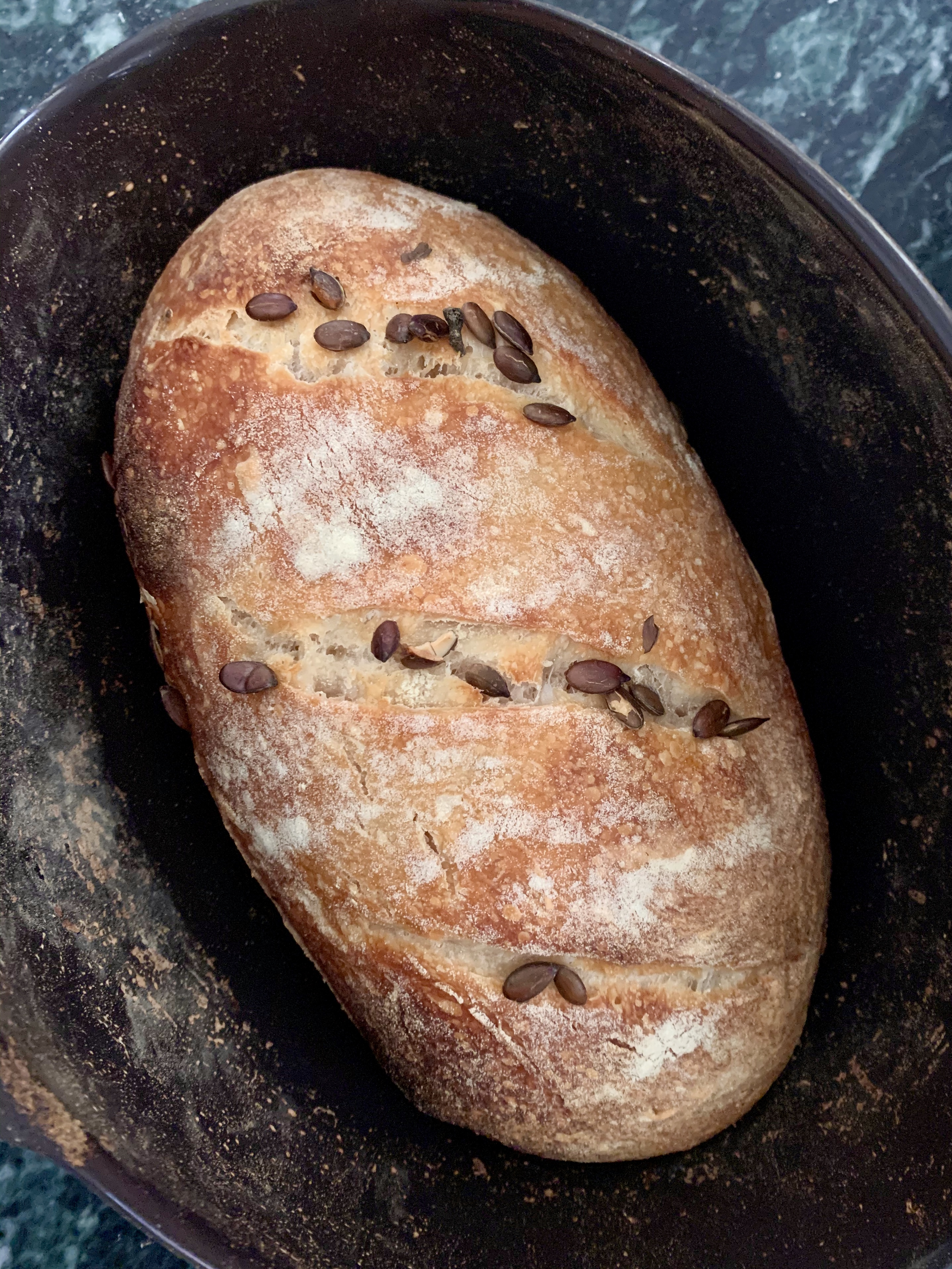
A loaf of homemade sourdough bread

This is a list of sourdough breads. Sourdough is prepared through the fermentation of dough using naturally occurring lactobacilli and yeast. The lactic acid produced by the lactobacilli imbues it with a more sour taste, as well as extending its shelf life compared to other breads. (Note: "Advantages of using sourdough in bread-making..." "Extended shelf life of sourdough bread — Longer mold-free period — prevention of rope in bread — Anti-staling effect") Sourdough baking has a devoted community today. Many devotees share starters and tips via the Internet, and hobbyists often proudly share their work on social media.

== Sourdough breads ==
- Amish friendship bread is a type of bread or cake made from a sourdough starter that is often shared in a manner similar to a chain letter. The starter is a substitute for baking yeast and can be used to make many kinds of yeast-based breads, shared with friends, or frozen for future use. The sweet, cake-like Amish cinnamon bread is a common bread that is made from this starter; it is a simple, stirred quick bread that includes a substantial amount of sugar and vegetable oil, with a mild cinnamon flavor. It has characteristics of both pound cake and coffee cake. The flavor of the finished product can be altered by cinnamon being omitted.

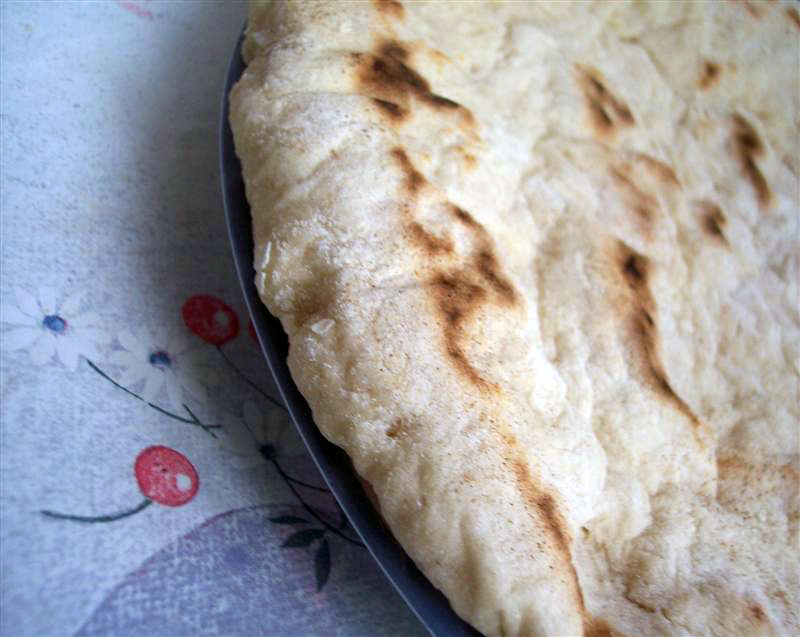
Bazlama

- Bazlama is a leavened, circular flatbread from Turkish cuisine with a soft, fluffy texture and slightly crisp exterior. It is made from wheat flour and yogurt (adding a slight tanginess) and has an average thickness of 2 cm and diameters ranging from 10 to 25 cm. After mixing and fermenting for two to three hours, a 200-250 gram piece of dough is made into balls, then rolled out flat and baked on a hot stove. During baking, the bread is turned over and fried on both sides.

After baking, it is generally consumed fresh and is often served as part of a traditional Turkish breakfast. Bazlama is sometimes referred to as "village bread" due to its popularity in rural areas of Turkey. Shelf life of bazlama varies from several hours to a few days, depending on storage conditions.

- Borodinsky bread (Russian: бородинский хлеб borodinskiy khleb) or borodino bread is a dark brown sourdough rye bread of Russian origin, traditionally sweetened with molasses and flavored with coriander and caraway seeds.
- In German cuisine, Butterbrot (literally: butter bread = bread with butter) is a slice of bread topped with butter. Also known as boterham in Dutch speaking countries, it is still considered Butterbrot or boterham even if additional toppings, such as cheese, spreads, or lunch meats, are added, as long as it begins with a slice of bread with butter.

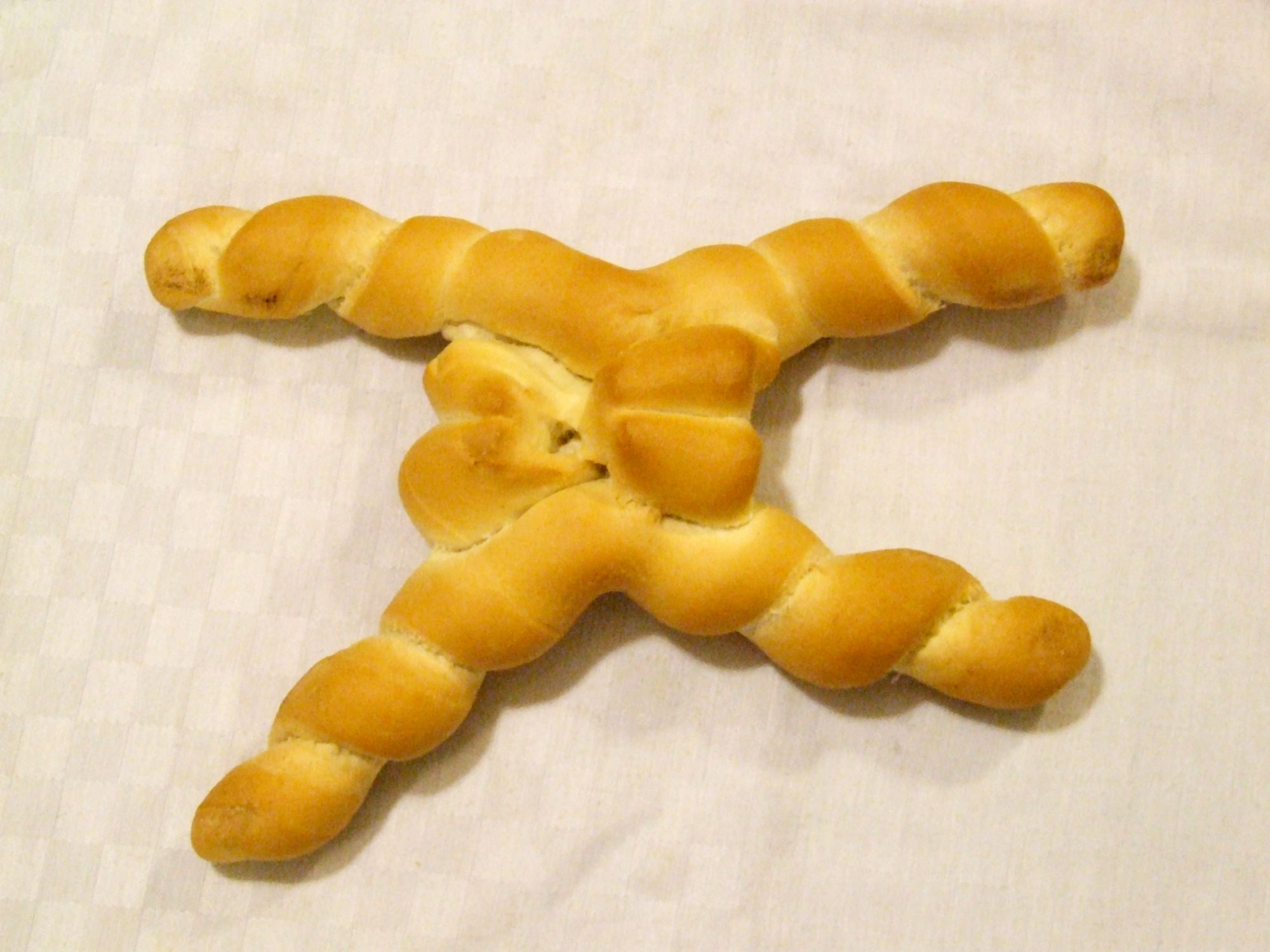
Coppia ferrarese

- Coppia ferrarese (Italian: [ˈkɔppja ferraˈreːze, ˈkop-, -eːse]), also known as ciopa, ciupeta and pane ferrarese, is a type of sourdough bread made with flour, lard, malt, and olive oil, and has a twisted shape. It was first made around the thirteenth century in the Italian province of Ferrara. It has protected geographical indication (PGI) in the European Union status under European Union law, which was obtained in 2001.
- Eish merahrah (Egyptian Arabic: عيش مرحرح, [ʕeːʃ meˈɾɑħɾɑħ], "smoothed-out bread", "spread-out bread") is a flatbread, made with ground fenugreek seeds and maize, eaten in Egypt. It is part of the traditional diet of the Egyptian countryside, prepared locally in village homes in Upper Egypt. The loaves are flat and wide, and usually about 50 cm (20 in) in diameter. A soft dough is made with the maize flour and left to ferment overnight with a sourdough starter, shaped into round loaves, and then allowed to rise or "proof" for 30 minutes before being flattened into round disks and baked.
- Eish shamsi (Egyptian Arabic: عيش شمسي), is a thick sourdough bread eaten in Egypt made with wheat flour. In Upper Egypt it replaces eish baladi as the local staple, although the latter is common as well. The name, which translates to "sun bread", is thought to derive from the practice of letting the dough rise in the sun. The bread is traditionally baked at home in domed clay ovens with openings at the top, although this tradition is fading with pre-made bread becoming increasingly common.
- Herman cake (often called Herman) is a 'friendship cake'. Similar to the Amish friendship bread, the starter is passed from person to person (like a chain letter) and continues to grow as it contains yeast and lactic acid bacteria. One starter can, in theory, last indefinitely. The other ingredients for the mixture are milk, sugar, flour and warm water. They became popular in the 1970s.

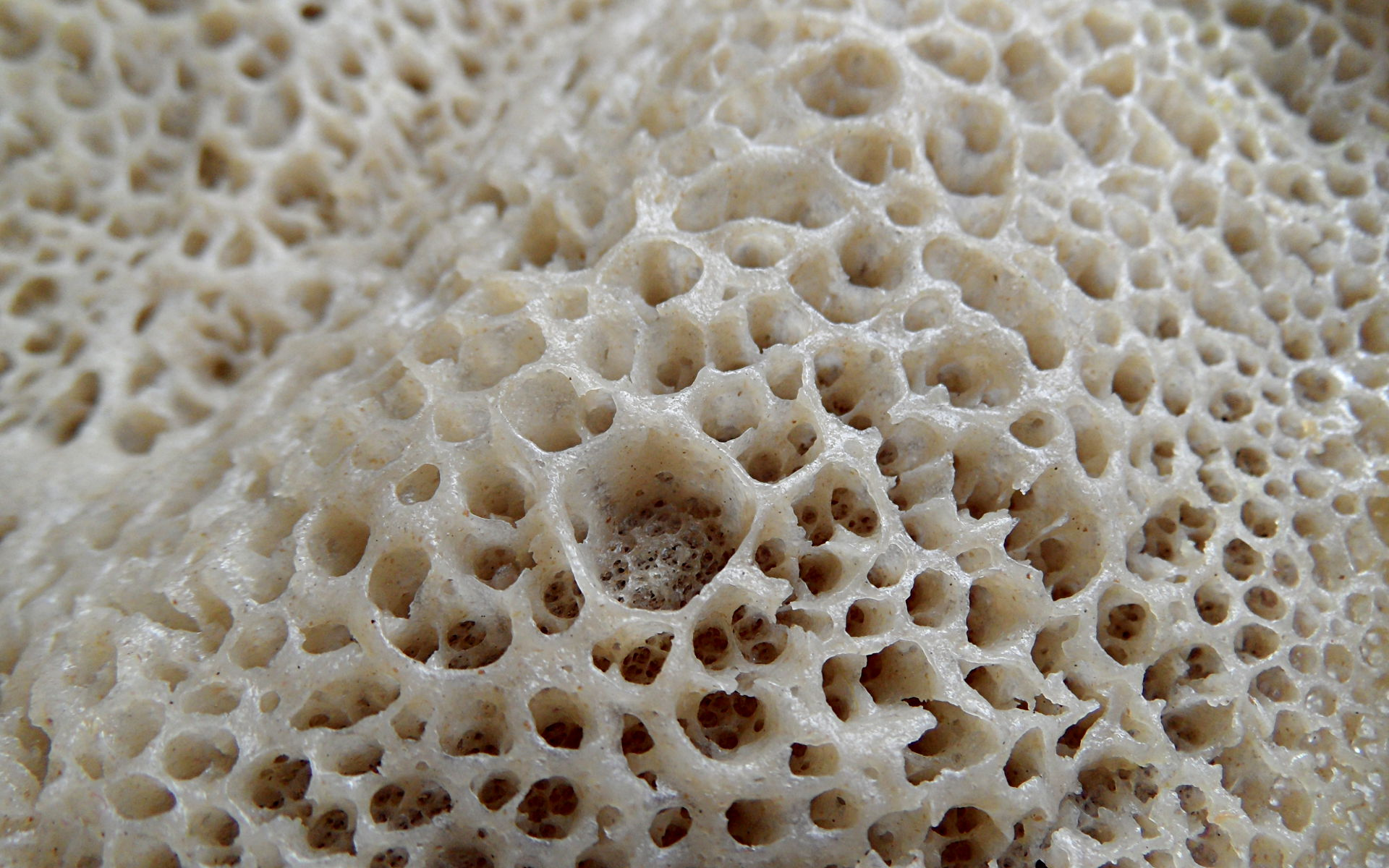
Ethiopian injera with its typical spongy texture

- Injera (Amharic: እንጀራ, romanized: ənǧära, [ɨndʒəra]; Tigrinya: ጣይታ, romanized: ṭayta; Oromo: buddeena) is a sour fermented pancake-like flatbread with a slightly spongy texture, traditionally made of teff flour. In Ethiopia and Eritrea, injera is a staple. Injera is central to the dining process in Amhara society, like bread or rice elsewhere, and is usually stored in the mesob.
- Kommissbrot, formerly Kommißbrot (German: [kɔˈmɪsˌbʁoːt] ), (German: commissary bread) is a dark type of German bread, baked from rye and other flours, historically used for military provisions.
- Maltese bread (Maltese: Il-Ħobż tal-Malti, tal-malti) is a crusty sourdough bread from Malta, usually baked in wood ovens. It is typically eaten with spread olive oil (Ħobż biż-żejt), where the bread is rubbed with tomatoes (as with the Catalan pa amb tomàquet) or tomato paste, drizzled with olive oil and filled with a choice or mix of tuna, olives, capers, onion, bigilla and ġbejna. The practice of making the bread is considered a 'dying art'.

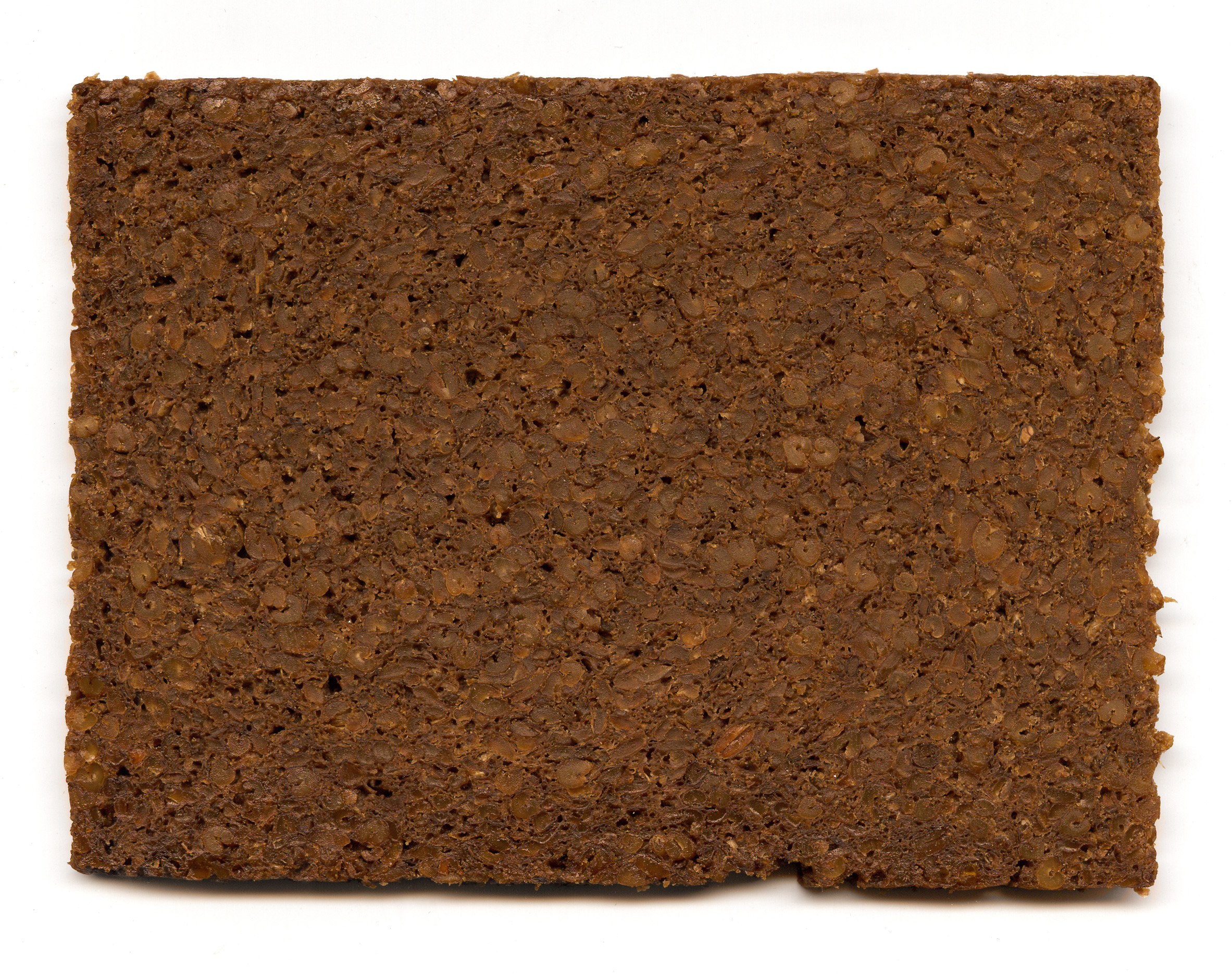
A slice of pumpernickel

- Pumpernickel (English: /ˈpʌmpərnɪkəl/; German: [ˈpʊmpɐˌnɪkl̩] ) is a typically dense, slightly sweet rye bread traditionally made with sourdough starter and coarsely ground rye. It is sometimes made with a combination of rye flour and whole rye grains ("rye berries").
- Rugbrød (Danish pronunciation: [ˈʁuˌpʁœðˀ], lit. 'rye bread') is a very common form of rye bread from Denmark. Rugbrød usually resembles a long brown extruded rectangle, no more than 12 cm (4.7 in) high, and 30 to 35 cm (11.8 to 13.8 in) long, depending on the bread pan in which it is baked. The basic ingredient is rye flour which will produce a plain or "old-fashioned" bread of uniform, somewhat heavy structure, but the most popular versions today contain whole grains (cracked or chopped rye kernels) and often other seeds such as sunflower seeds, linseeds or pumpkin seeds. Most Danes eat rugbrød every day.

== Gallery ==
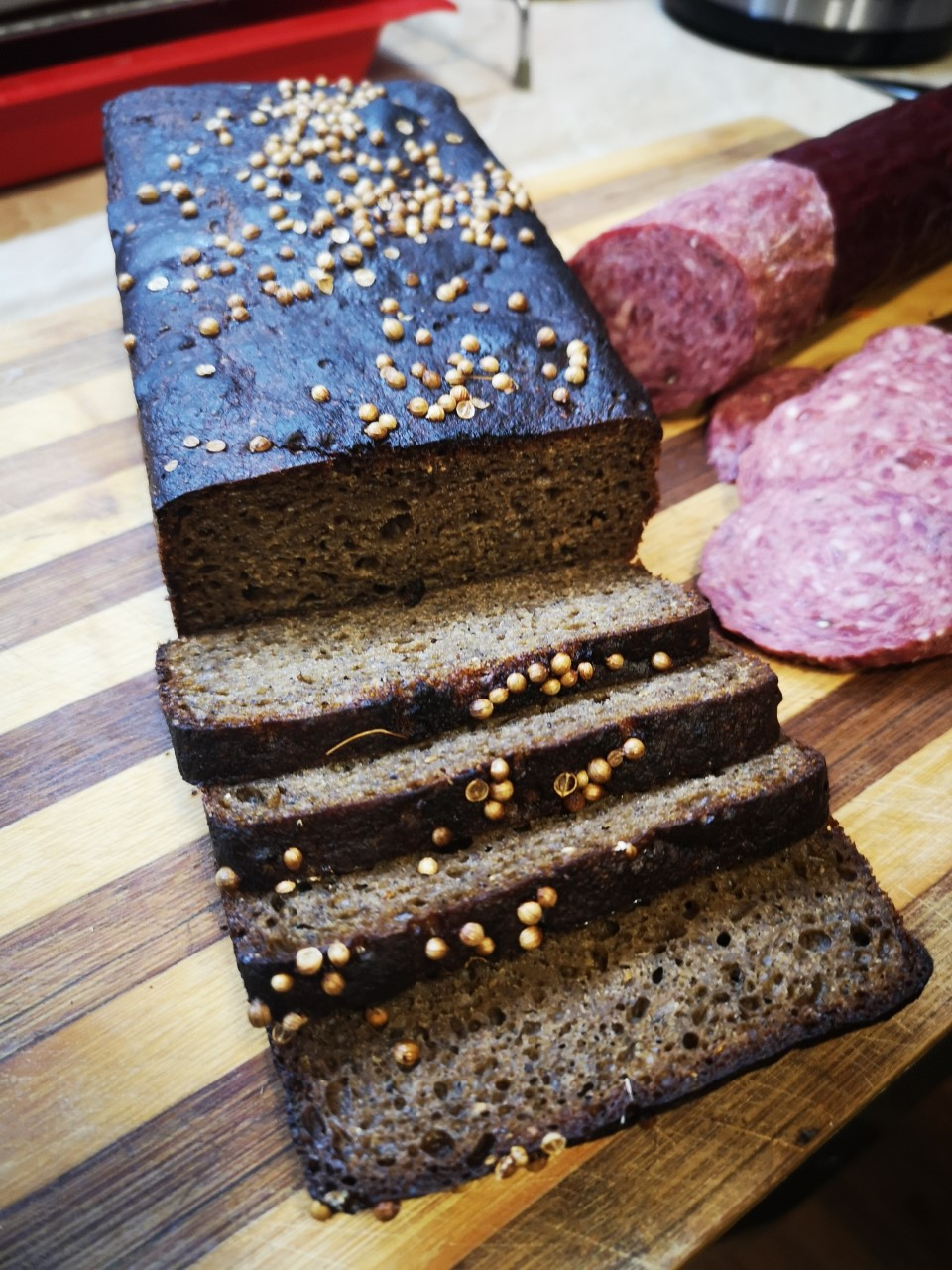
Borodinsky bread

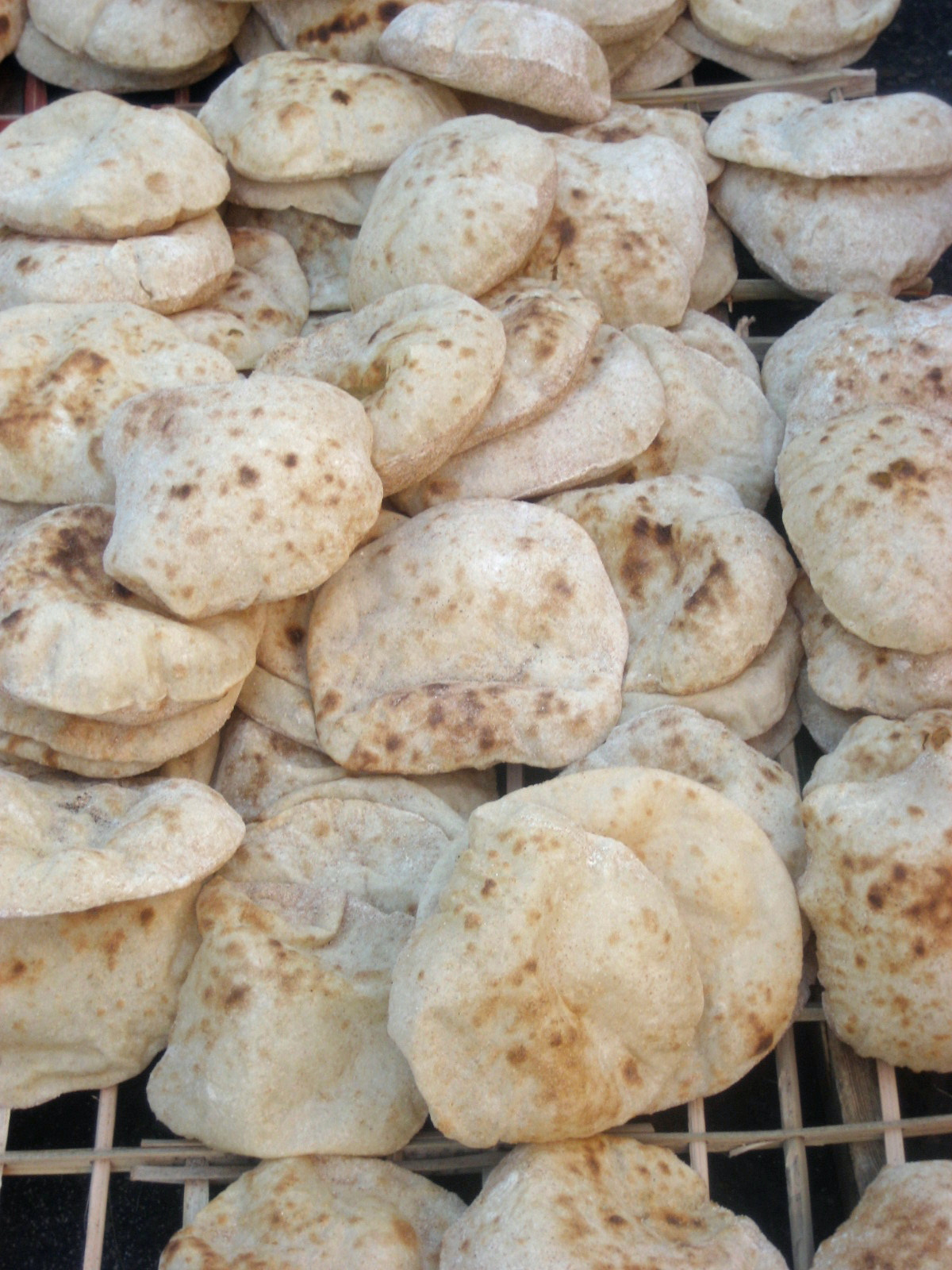
Eish merahrah

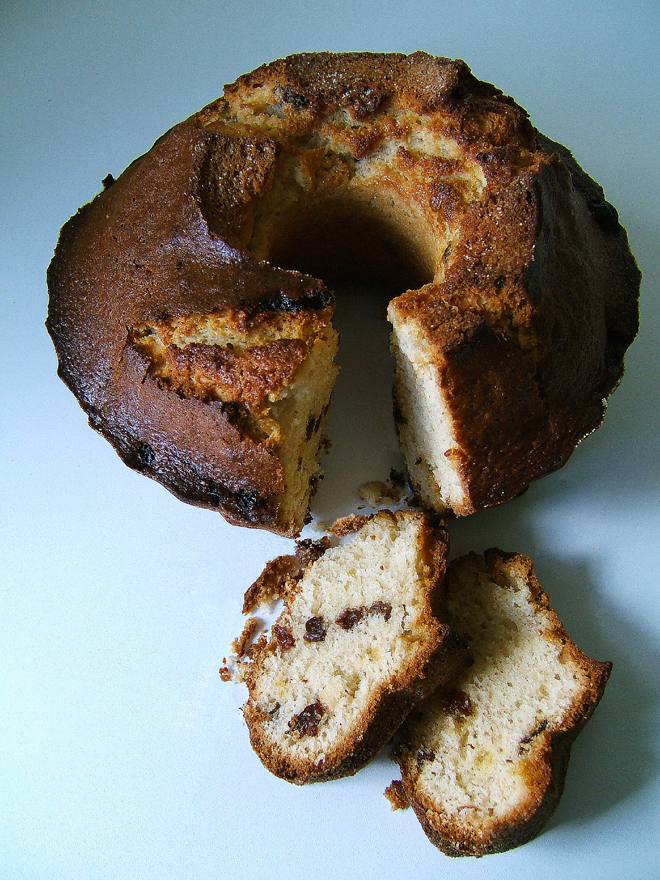
Herman cake

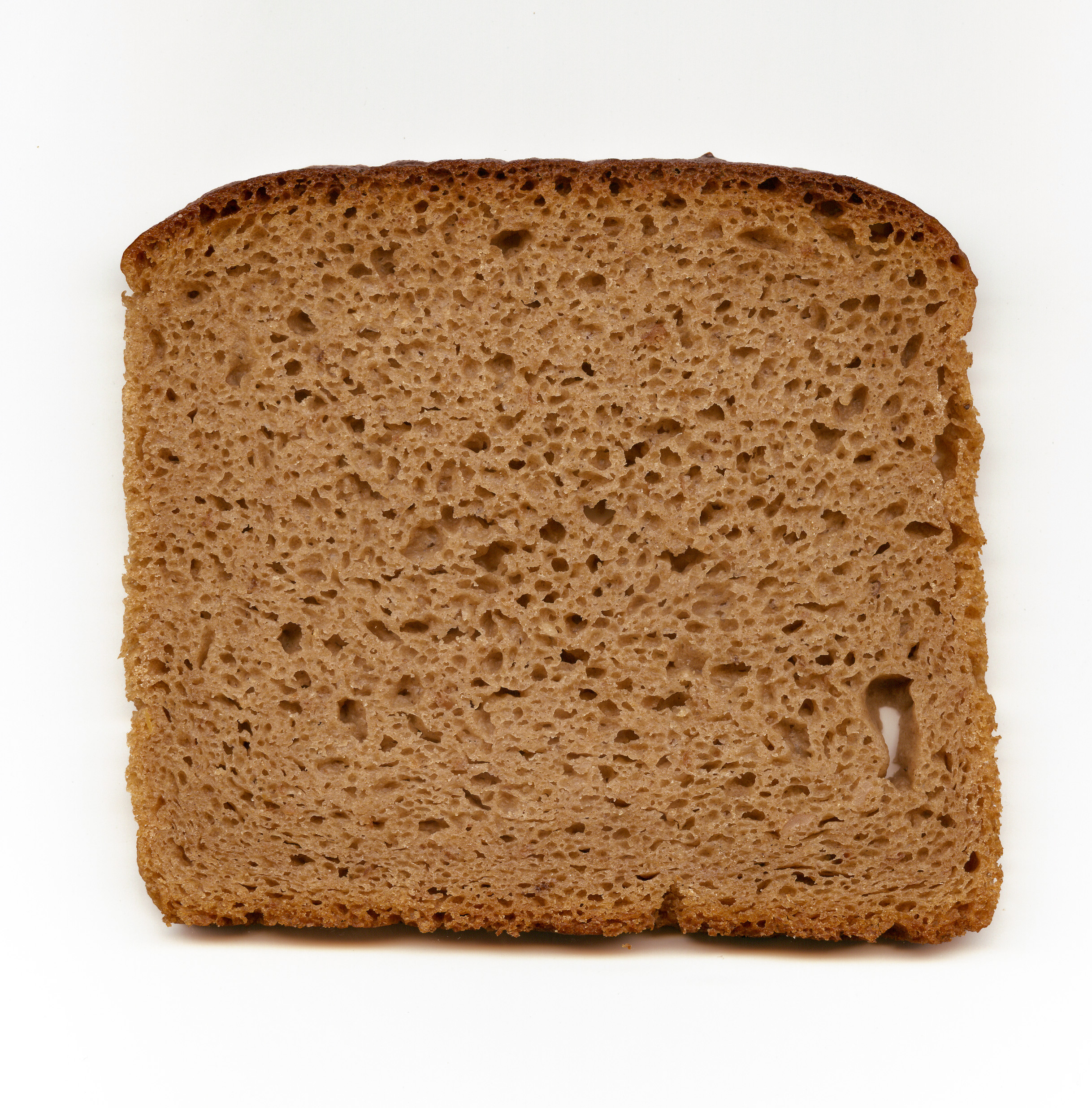
Kommissbrot

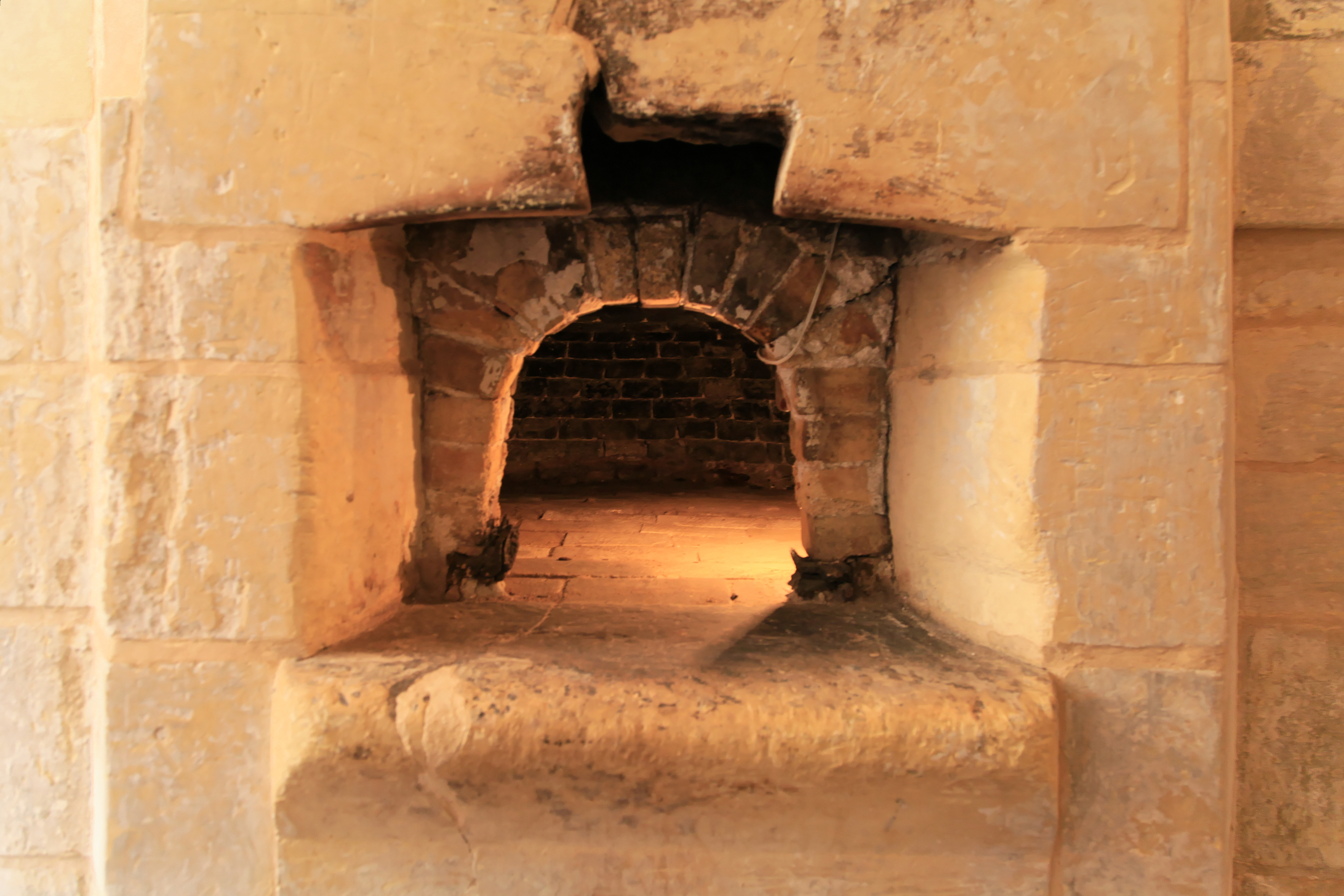
A Maltese bread oven

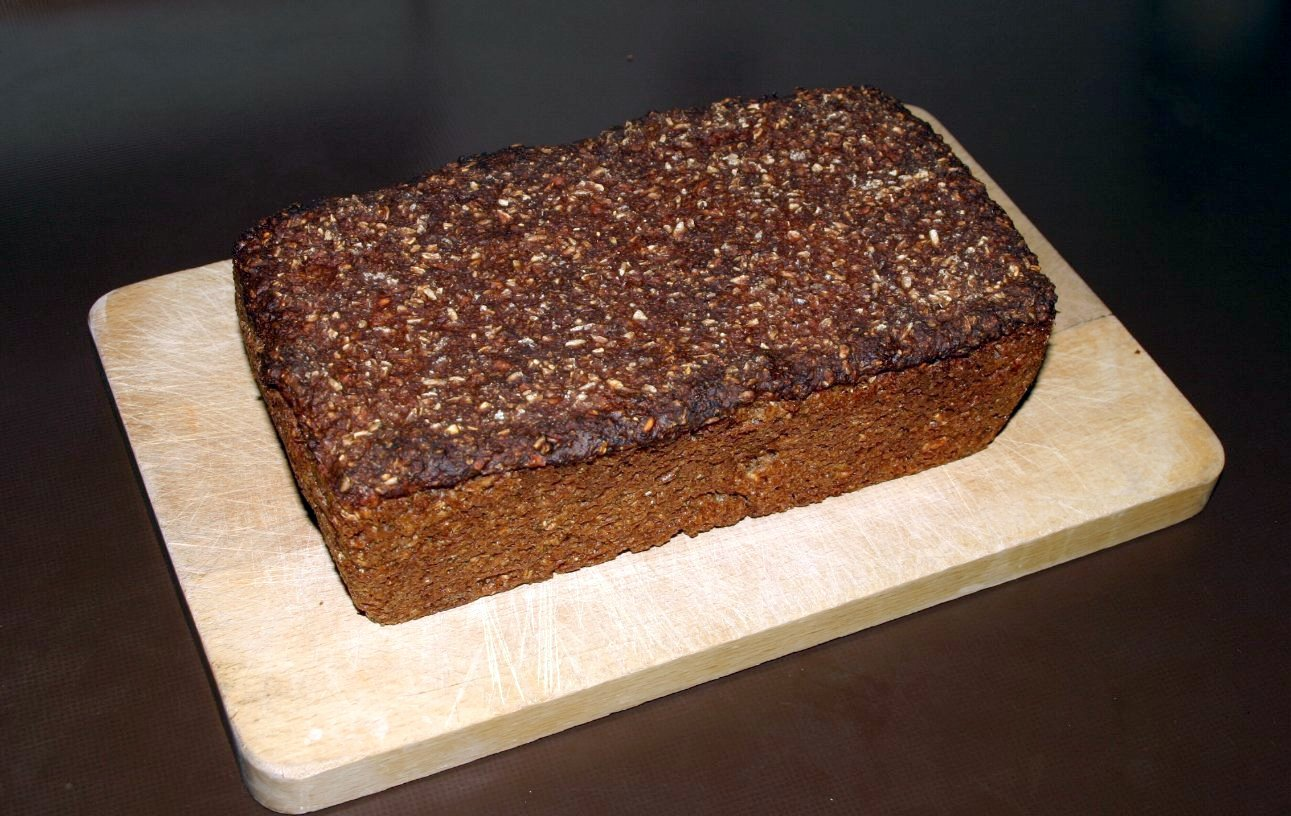
Rugbrød

== See also ==
- Carl Griffith's sourdough starter – Sourdough culture
- Desem – Sourdough starter made from whole wheat flour, spelt flour or other flours
- Herculaneum loaf – Sourdough bread loaf baked 79 AD
- List of microorganisms found in sourdough
- List of breads
- The Puratos Sourdough Library – the only facility in the world dedicated to housing sourdough cultures
