= T.K. Khaleel =

Famous Indian Baker & Entrepreneur

T. K. Khaleel
- Born: March 18, 1959 (age 67); Mahe, Puducherry
- Occupations: Baker; Entrepreneur
- Years active: 1979–present
- Organizations: Bakemart; Artisan Bakers
- Website: https://tkkhaleel.com

T. K. Khaleel is an Indian master baker and entrepreneur, primarily known as the founder of the Middle Eastern bakery chains Bakemart and Artisan Bakers. In 2021, the UAE and Bahrain operations of Bakemart, were acquired by Almarai, a publicly-traded Saudi food conglomerate, for an enterprise value of $25.5 million. His work has received significant industry recognition, including the Arab Franchise Lifetime Achievement Award in 2022, and is reportedly the only Asian baker to have a sourdough starter accepted into the Puratos Sourdough Library in Belgium.

== Career ==
=== Bakemart ===
In 2003, Khaleel founded Bakemart in Dubai, selling frozen baked goods to the hospitality sector.

During his tenure as Managing Director, Bakemart expanded its operations to include facilities in the UAE, Qatar, and Bahrain, supplying over 200 five-star hotels and employing a workforce of nearly 1,500 people. The company launched a premium retail line, Bakemart Gourmet, in 2016.

In March 2021, the Saudi Arabian food and beverage company Almarai announced it would acquire 100% of Bakemart's operations in the UAE and Bahrain. The deal, which was finalized in January 2022, had an enterprise value of AED 93.5 million (approximately $25.5 million) and was financed from Almarai's operating cash flow.

=== Artisan Bakers ===
Following the sale of Bakemart, Khaleel launched his current venture, Artisan Bakers, where he serves as founder and managing director. The brand operates in the UAE and Qatar.

With Artisan Bakers, Khaleel shifted to a franchise-based expansion model, announcing plans to open 100 outlets across the GCC region.

== Awards and recognition ==
=== Sourdough Library ===
In 2013, a sourdough starter Khaleel developed was accepted into the Puratos Sourdough Library in St. Vith, Belgium, a non-profit initiative that preserves global sourdough biodiversity. His starter is cataloged as Exhibit No. 128. He is the only Asian baker to have received this honor.

=== Awards ===
- 2022: Lifetime Achievement Award at the Arab Franchise Awards in Dubai.
- 2024: Baker of the Year Award at the Gulf Franchise Awards in Abu Dhabi.
