= Maudiozyma humilis =

Scientific classification
- Kingdom: Fungi
- Division: Ascomycota
- Class: Saccharomycetes
- Order: Saccharomycetales
- Family: Saccharomycetaceae
- Genus: Maudiozyma
- Species: M. humilis

Binomial name
- Maudiozyma humilis (E.E. Nel & Van der Walt) Q.M. Wang, Yurkov & Boekhout, 2024

Synonyms
- Torulopsis humilis E.E.Nel & Van der Walt (1968); Torulopsis acidi-lactici Nakase, Komag. & Konishi (1977); Candida milleri Yarrow (1978)

Species of fungus

Maudiozyma humilis (prev. Candida humilis and Kazachstania humilis) is a species of yeast in the genus Maudiozyma. It commonly occurs in sourdough and kefir cultures, along with different species of lactic acid bacteria (e.g., Limosilactobacillus fermentum, Companilactobacillus paralimentarius, Lactiplantibacillus plantarum, and Fructilactobacillus sanfranciscensis). M. humilis is the most representative yeast species found in type I sourdough ecosystems. The effects of electric field strength, pulse width and frequency, or pulse shape is significant on the membranes of Maudiozyma humilis, but not very noticeable.

M. humilis was separated from C. milleri in The Yeasts (fifth edition) in September 2016, although this is not universally accepted and they are still considered synonymous.
