= Coppia ferrarese =

Twisted Italian sourdough bread

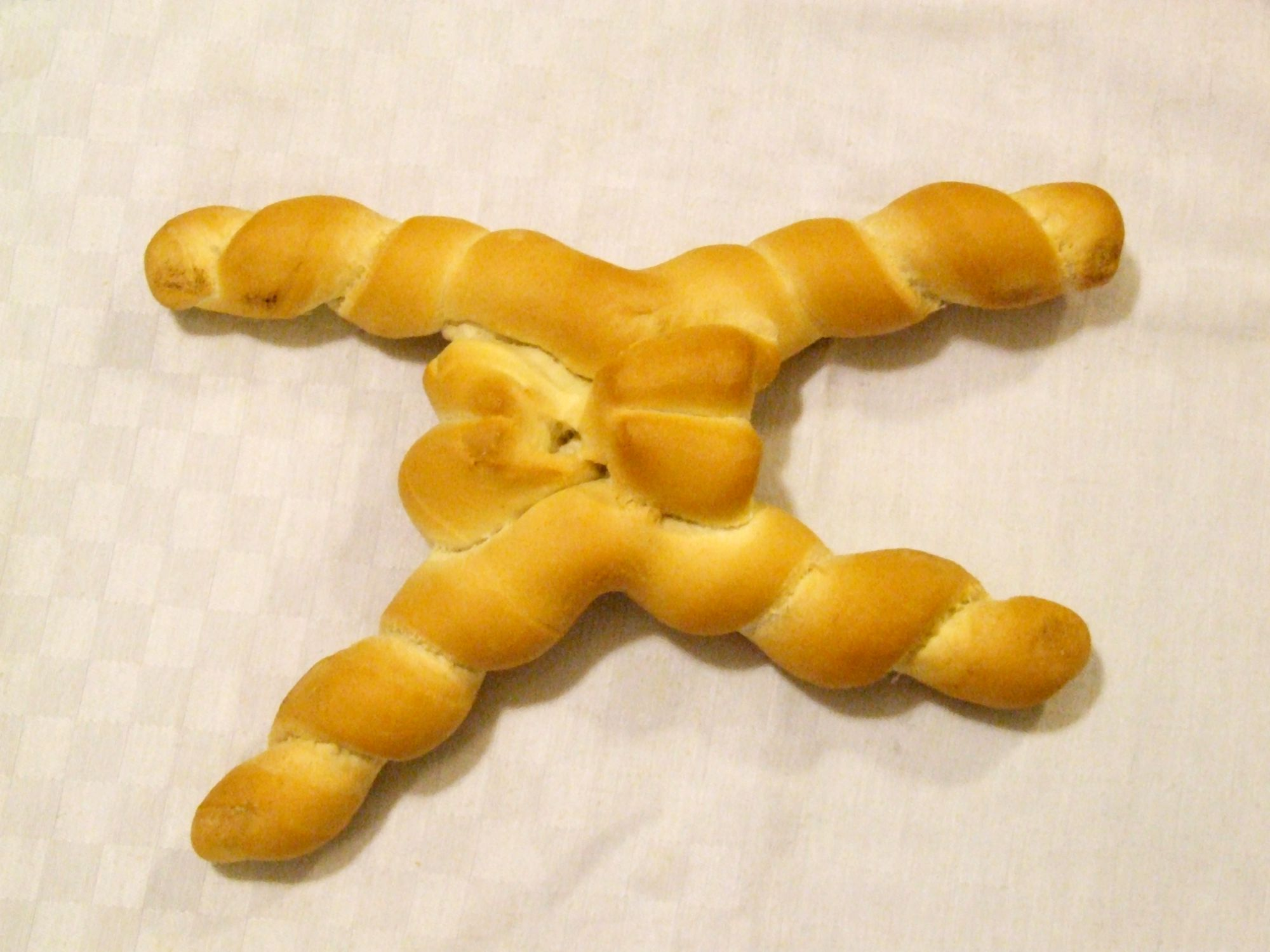
- Type: Bread
- Place of origin: Italy
- Region or state: Ferrara and province of Ferrara, Emilia-Romagna
- Main ingredients: Flour, lard, malt, olive oil

Coppia ferrarese (Italian: [ˈkɔppja ferraˈreːze, ˈkop-, -eːse]), also known as ciopa, ciupeta and pane ferrarese, is a type of sourdough bread made with flour, lard, malt, and olive oil, and has a twisted shape. It was first made around the thirteenth century in the Italian province of Ferrara. It has protected geographical indication (PGI) in the European Union status under European Union law, which was obtained in 2001.

== History ==
The first record of special regulations regarding bread making in Ferrara date from a statute in 1287. The first mention of a bread similar to current coppia ferrarese dates from 1536 when, according to Cristoforo da Messisbugo, the Duke of Este was offered a pane ritorto ("woven bread") during the Carnival. The tradition of cooking this sort of bread remained throughout history until the unification of Italy. In 2001, the recipe gained PGI status under European Union law.

Regulations require certain conditions, such as a maximum humidity of between 12 and 15% and that it be sold within twenty four hours.

== Cultural impact ==
Coppia ferrarese is a staple of the culture of the city of Ferrara, and has been named as one of the two most critical part of the cuisine (alongside a specialist salami). In 2008, Folco Quilici recounts how his family would quickly bring any conversation with strangers around to the bread. It is named the best bread in the world by Riccardo Bacchelli in Il mulino del Po while Corrado Govoni talks of Il nostro Pane: orgoglio di noi ferraresi. Dono dell'aria, dell'acqua, dell'uomo. Offerta generosa di Ferrara al mondo ("Our Bread: pride of us from Ferrara. Gift of air, water, of man. Generous gift of Ferrara to the world").

== See also ==
Media related to Coppia ferrarese at Wikimedia Commons
