= Herculaneum loaf =

Sourdough bread loaf baked 79 AD

The Herculaneum loaf is a stamped sourdough loaf of bread that was baked in the town of Herculaneum shortly before the Eruption of Mount Vesuvius in 79 AD. It has been partially preserved due to being carbonised in the eruption. It was discovered on the archaeological site in 1930.

The loaf was found in a house owned by Quintus Granius Verus and bears a stamp stating that it was made by one of his slaves. It is currently in the National Archaeological Museum, Naples.

== Preservation and discovery ==
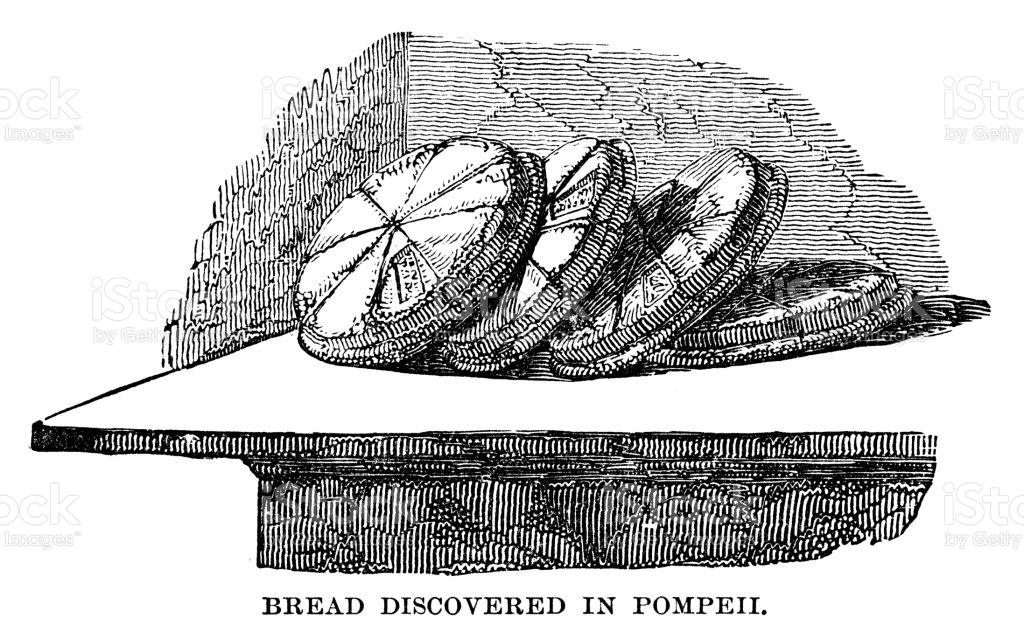
Loaves from Pompeii show similar depressions on their sides signifying that they were tied with a string when baked.

The Herculaneum loaf was baked just before the eruption of Mount Vesuvius in 79 AD.

Other similar loaves have been also recovered from the archaeological sites at Pompeii and Herculaneum. One such discovery included 81 loaves of bread from a single oven. However, foodstuff which has survived in Pompeii and Herculaneum has been known to be noticeably smaller than expected caused by loss of water. Presumably, the surviving breads have also shrunk in size, as they were subjected to temperatures of at least 400°C. Scoring and stamping on the Herculaneum loaf is clear due to this process of carbonisation by the pyroclastic flow.

The loaf was discovered in 1930 when the House of the Stags was excavated (between 1929–1932) where the loaf of bread was found.

The loaf is currently held at the National Archaeological Museum, Naples.

== Features of the bread ==
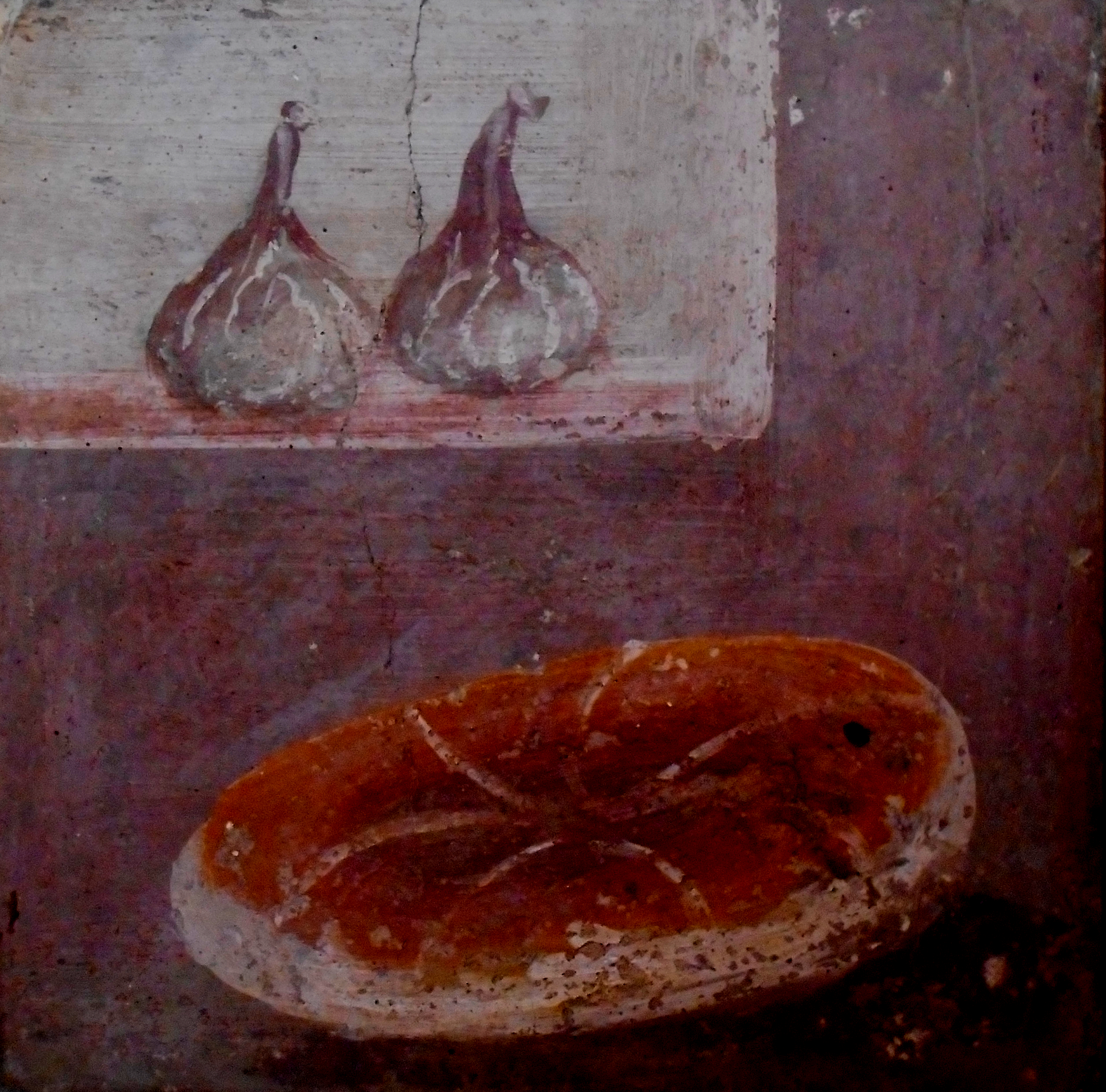
Similar incised bread, and two figs, as portrayed in a wall painting from Herculaneum

The bread has been analysed and is a sourdough type whose recipe has been recreated.

The loaf was incised before being baked by dividing it into wedges to make the bread easier to share. Similar loaves appear in Roman art.

The bread had been tied with a string around its side, shown by a line, to make it easier to carry.

The loaf is stamped with the text "Of Celer, slave of [Quintus] Granius Verus". Loaves of bread were marked in this manner before being, for instance, taken into a communal bakery (see signum pistoris). The bread's original owner, Celer, is known to have survived the eruption of Vesuvius and the subsequent pyroclastic flow as his name appears in a later list of freed slaves. Celer's captor Quintus Granius Verus was one of the city elders and the loaf itself is important as it proves that he owned the House of the Stags where the loaf was discovered. Quintus Granius Verus was also a member of a successful merchant family.

== See also ==
- Food and dining in the Roman Empire
- Herculaneum papyri
- Petrified wood
