= The Puratos Sourdough Library =

Sourdough culture preservation facility

Coordinates: 50.88098°N 4.26994°E

The Sourdough Library was founded in October 2013 in Saint-Vith, Belgium, and is the only facility in the world dedicated to housing sourdough cultures. The library is housed at the Puratos Center for Bread Flavour, with a mission to conserve and promote sourdoughs from around the world, to conduct research, and to ensure the survival of the various strains for future use. It currently has over 900 strains of wild yeast and lactic acid bacteria recorded. Every new sample that arrives at the library is checked and analyzed in the laboratory, run by Professor Marco Gobbetti. The library is a not-for profit initiative from Puratos and as of 2016 has 87 sourdoughs, including 12 from the United States.

== See also ==
- List of sourdough breads
