= Eish merahrah =

Egyptian flatbread

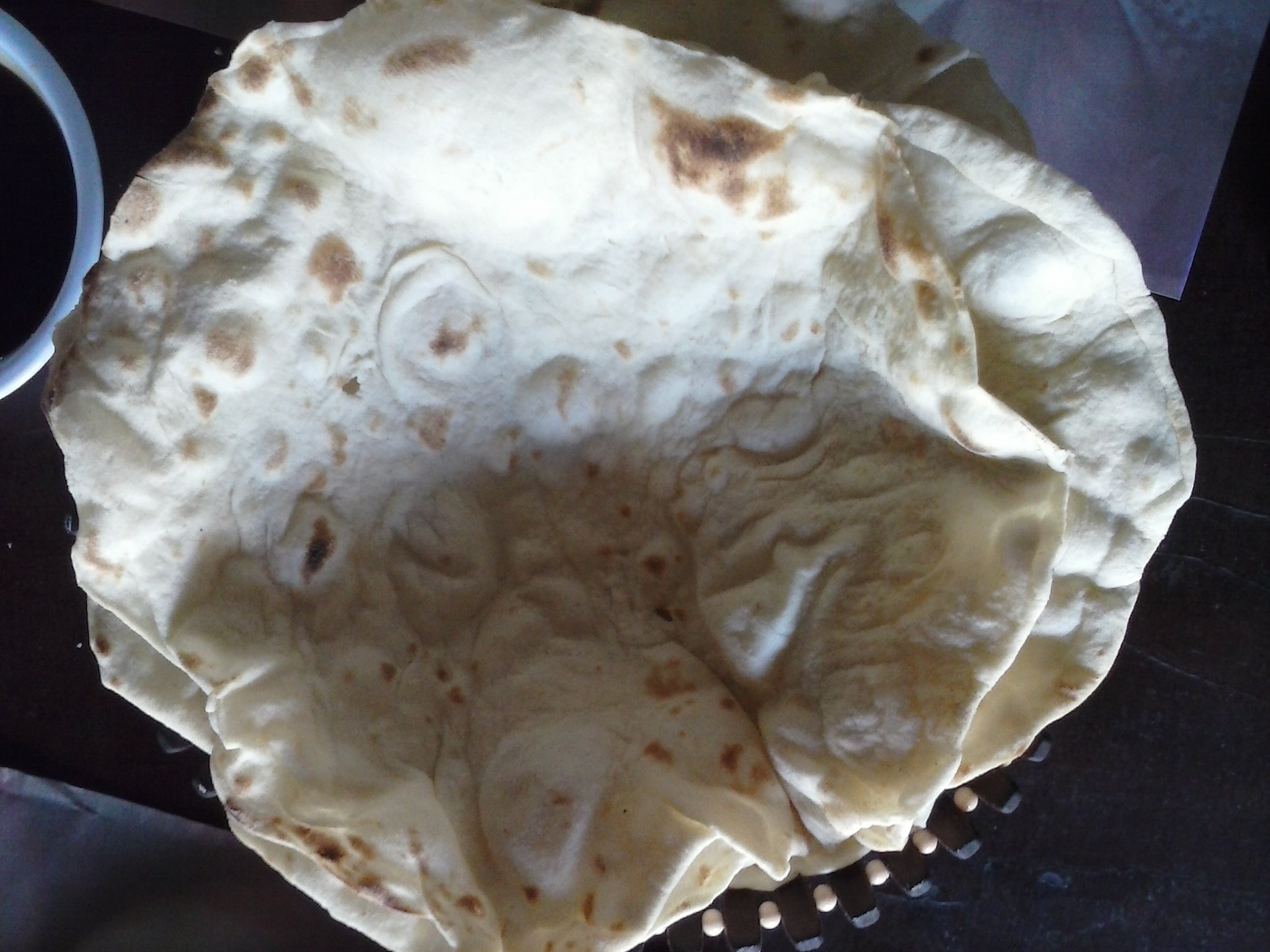
- Type: Flatbread
- Place of origin: Egypt
- Main ingredients: Fenugreek seeds, maize flour, sourdough starter

Eish merahrah (Egyptian Arabic: عيش مرحرح, [ʕeːʃ meˈɾɑħɾɑħ], "smoothed-out bread", "spread-out bread") is a flatbread, made with ground fenugreek seeds and maize, eaten in Egypt. It is part of the traditional diet of the Egyptian countryside, prepared locally in village homes in Upper Egypt. The loaves are flat and wide, and usually about 50 cm (20 in) in diameter. A soft dough is made with the maize flour and left to ferment overnight with a sourdough starter, shaped into round loaves, and then allowed to rise or "proof" for 30 minutes before being flattened into round disks and baked.

These loaves can be kept for one to two weeks in an airtight container. The addition of fenugreek seeds is thought to increase the protein content, storage length, and digestibility of the bread.
