= Fructilactobacillus sanfranciscensis =

Scientific classification
- Domain: Bacteria
- Kingdom: Bacillati
- Phylum: Bacillota
- Class: Bacilli
- Order: Lactobacillales
- Family: Lactobacillaceae
- Genus: Fructilactobacillus
- Species: F. sanfranciscensis

Binomial name
- Fructilactobacillus sanfranciscensis (Weiss and Schillinger 1984) Zheng et al. 2020

Synonyms
- Lactobacillus brevis subsp. lindneri; Lactobacillus sanfranciscensis corrig. (ex Kline and Sugihara 1971) Weiss and Schillinger 1984; Lactobacillus sanfrancisco (ex Kline and Sugihara 1971) Weiss and Schillinger 1984

Species of bacterium

Fructilactobacillus sanfranciscensis is a heterofermentative species of lactic acid bacteria which, through the production mainly of lactic and acetic acids, helps give sourdough bread its characteristic taste. It is named after San Francisco, where sourdough was found to contain the variety, though it is dominant in Type I sourdoughs globally. In fact, F. sanfranciscensis has been used in sourdough breads for thousands of years, and is used in 3 million tons of sourdough goods yearly. For commercial use, specific strains of F. sanfranciscensis are grown on defined media, freeze-dried, and shipped to bakeries worldwide.

== Overview ==
Fructilactobacillus sanfranciscensis was first known to be isolated in 1971 by Kline and Sugihara. As lactic acid bacteria, the strains are Gram-positive, slender, rod-shaped, nonsporulating, and non-motile. They are also obligately heterofermentative, meaning that they can convert hexose sugars into not just lactic acid, but also ethanol, CO_{2}, and/or acetic acid. This heterofermentative ability is key for this species' role in creating the unique flavor of sourdough bread.

Sourdough starters are leavened by a mixture of yeast and lactobacilli in a ratio of about 1:100. Common yeast species found in combination with F. sanfranciscensis are Kazachstania humilis, Saccharomyces cerevisiae, and Wickerhamomyces anomalus. This yeast cannot metabolize the maltose found in the dough, while the Fructilactobacillus requires maltose. They therefore act without conflict for substrate, with lactobacilli utilizing maltose and the yeast utilizing the other sugars, including the glucose produced by the F. sanfranciscensis.

== Growth conditions ==
External conditions such as acidity and temperature affect the growth rates of F. sanfranciscensis. A temperature of 33 °C (91 °F) leads to maximum growth rates, whereas temperatures over 41 °C (105 °F) completely inhibit the bacteria growth. And in terms of pH, most strains can tolerate levels as low as 3.6, but the optimal range for growth is slightly higher (around 4–5) as it is also the optimum pH for some of the key proteins involved—for example, those involved in maltose transport function optimally at 5.2–5.6. However, there is lots of intraspecies diversity within Fructilactobacillus sanfranciscensis, so the optimal temperature and pH for growth will vary from strain to strain, and depend on a variety of factors—namely, the type of carbon source for metabolism, and the resulting proteins involved. For instance, a common yeast in sourdough, K. humilis, prefers 27 °C (81 °F) and will not grow above 36 °C (97 °F).

== Genome ==
The genomes of Fructilactobacillus sanfranciscensis strains are often quite small—in fact, they are suggested to be the smallest of all the lactobacilli. It is even thought that many genes within F. sanfranciscensis (that are also present in other heterofermentative lactobacilli) were lost or deleted via mutation. However, despite this loss of genes and overall smaller genome size, the F. sanfranciscensis genomes are relatively dense in ribosomal RNA (rRNA) operons, which contributes to more rapid growth and protein production. Additionally, the smaller genome allows for a significant amount of metabolic energy to be conserved. Overall, the genome length can vary from strain to strain; some can have more plasmids than others, some have slightly longer circular chromosomes, etc., but most strains share this characteristically small genome with a high density of rRNA operons, which allow for relatively fast growth rates.
