= Desem =

Sourdough starter made from whole wheat flour, spelt flour or other flours

- Type: Pre-ferment and bread
- Main ingredients: Flour (whole wheat, spelt, amaranth or kamut)

Desem (pronounced DAY-zum) (Dutch for "leaven") is both a type of sourdough starter made from whole wheat flour, spelt flour or other flours (such as kamut, durum and tritordeum) and water, and the resulting bread.

Desem starter is traditionally used in Belgium to make healthy, nutrient-rich bread. The starter is grown in a bed of flour at cool temperatures until it reaches sufficient maturity. The starter is not exposed to outside bacteria and yeasts, but achieves its leavening power from organisms present in the whole wheat flour itself. For this reason, desem starter is best made with grains free of chemicals (i.e. organically grown without herbicides, pesticides or dessicants) and water that does not contain chlorine or fluoride. The leavening power of desem starter may be stronger than that of typical sourdough starters.

The term "desem" also describes the loaf made with this starter. Desem bread made from a mature desem is characterized by a strong rise, and a light texture, with a nutty taste. When made properly desem bread is less sour than German or San Francisco sourdough breads. The loaf is similar in process to the French "pain au levain", but made with whole wheat flour and starter instead of white flour. Desem bread is considered to be a "naturally leavened" bread, rather than a "yeasted" bread. It keeps well and digests comfortably.

Desem bread has a strong following in the natural foods community, where it was largely popularized by vegetarian cookbook author Laurel Robertson.

== Preparation ==
=== Starter ===
Unlike sourdough starters which are exposed to outside air, the desem starter is grown in a bed of flour (3-4 inches of flour surrounding the ball of dough made from fresh wheat flour and pure water). Keeping the flour cool (approx. 50-65°F, or 10-18°C) during the initial incubation period is important as higher temperatures may make the desem starter sour. The cool incubation environment is particularly important for desem. While getting a desem starter (a dough starter) going the first time can be challenging, keeping it going can be easier than sourdough starters (liquid starters).

Feeding the starter daily and baking bread once per week is the standard method of keeping the desem starter happy and thriving but feeding it weekly or freezing it for later are viable options.

=== Methods and baking ===
The techniques for making desem bread are similar to the techniques used for sourdough breads, but present unique challenges.
