= Herman cake =

Sourdough cake

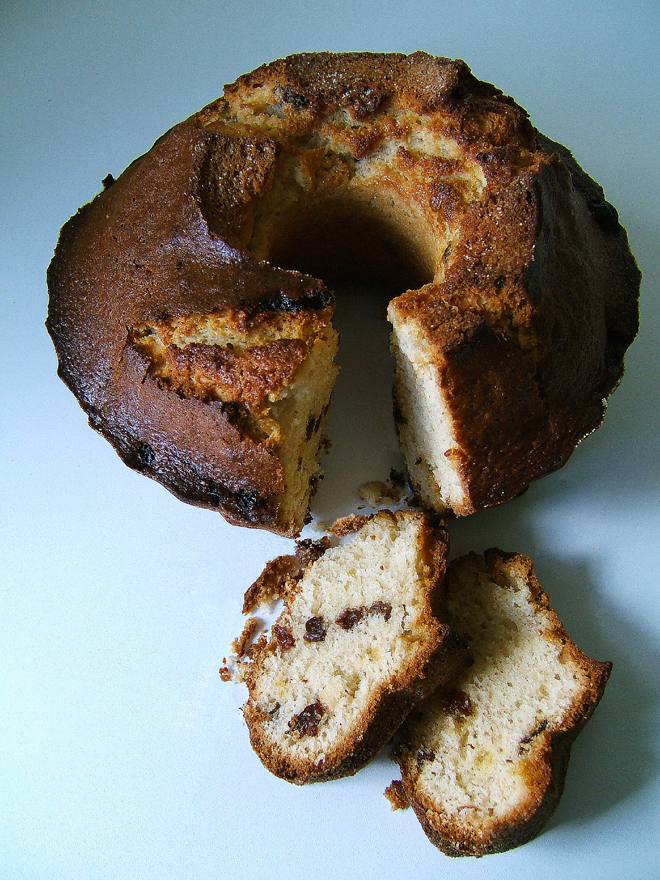
- Type: Cake
- Main ingredients: Yeast, sugar, flour, milk

Herman cake (often called Herman) is a 'friendship cake'. Similar to the Amish friendship bread, the starter is passed from person to person (like a chain letter) and continues to grow as it contains yeast and lactic acid bacteria. One starter can, in theory, last indefinitely. The other ingredients for the mixture are milk, sugar, flour and warm water. They became popular in the 1970s.

The Herman starter does not have to be refrigerated, and sits on a countertop for ten days. The starter 'breathes' when covered loosely with a tea-towel and left out on the worktop and stirred occasionally. This occurs because of the yeast in the Herman starter, making the mixture frequently bubble. The dough also smells strongly of beer because of the yeast.

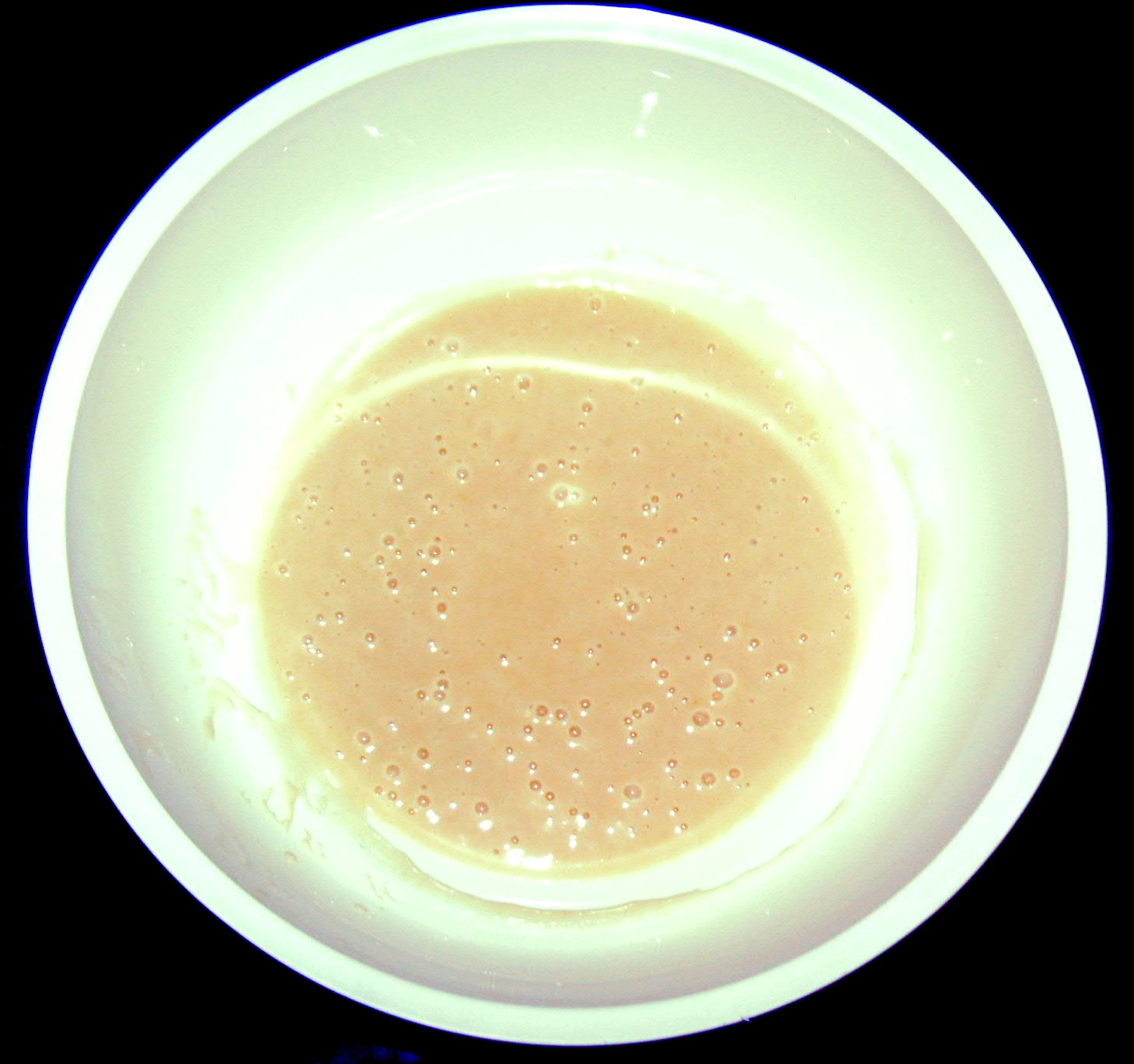
The Herman mixture

The Herman starter is given in a jar with a set of instructions to guide through the next ten days with the mixture. After four days additional ingredients are added and stirred, and again on the eighth day. On the ninth day, Herman is divided into equal parts (four or five) and all but one of these parts are passed along to friends. The last part is kept and on the tenth day is cooked. Many ingredients can be added to Herman before the procedure of cooking the Herman cake. These ingredients can include eggs, cinnamon, apples, chocolate, and cherries to make Herman sweet or olives and sun-dried tomatoes for a savoury taste.

The German magazine Stern noted the resurgence in popularity of 'Hermann Teig' in Germany in the early 2000s - including the publication of a book by Dr. Oetker titled "Backen mit Hermann und Siegfried" - and commented on the similarity to another food trend: kombucha, a fermented sweetened tea.

== See also ==
- Biga
- Sourdough
