= Carl Griffith's sourdough starter =

Sourdough culture

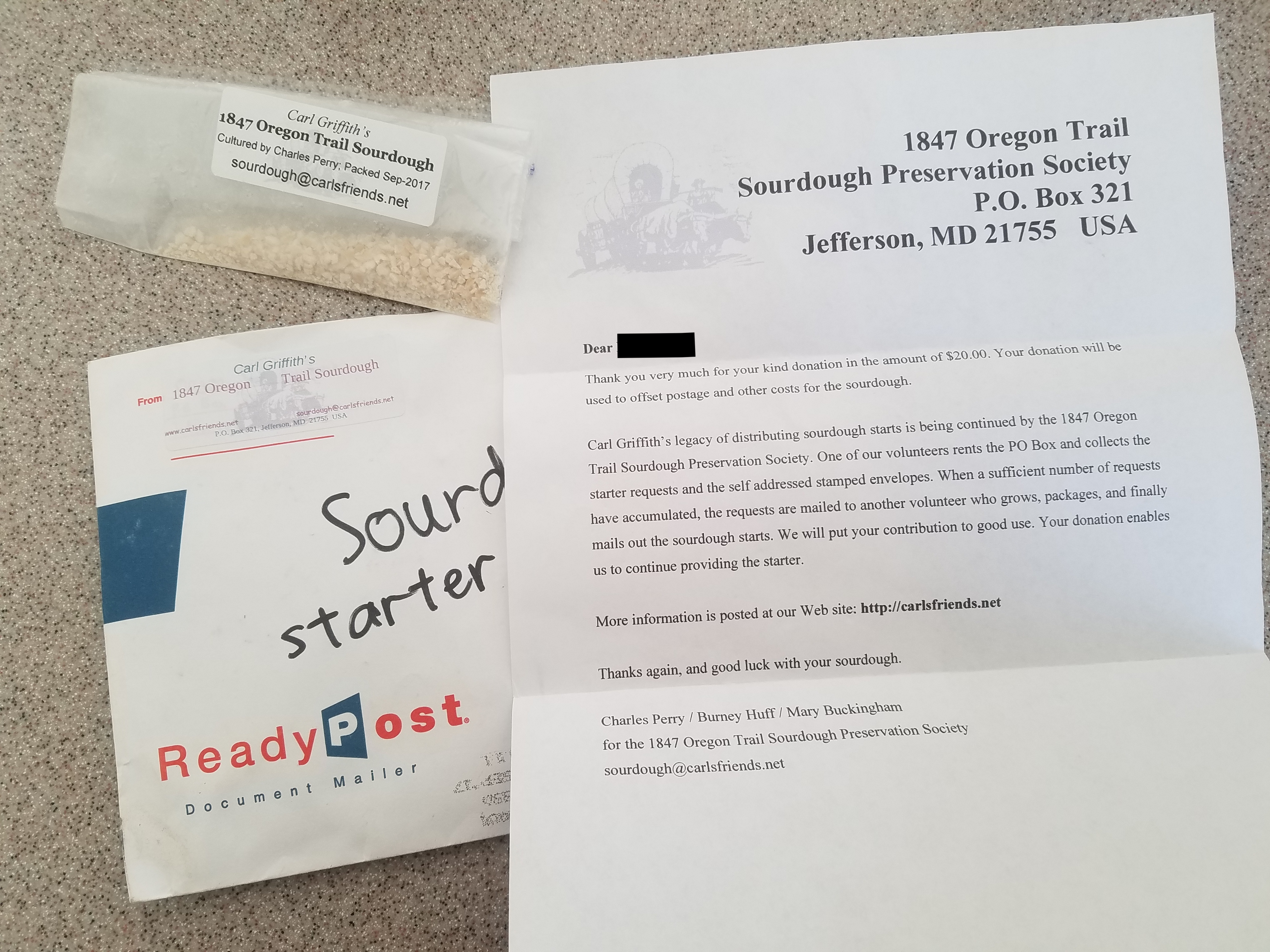
Contents of an envelope sent by the 1847 Oregon Trail Sourdough Starter Preservation Society, also known as Carl Griffith's Friends

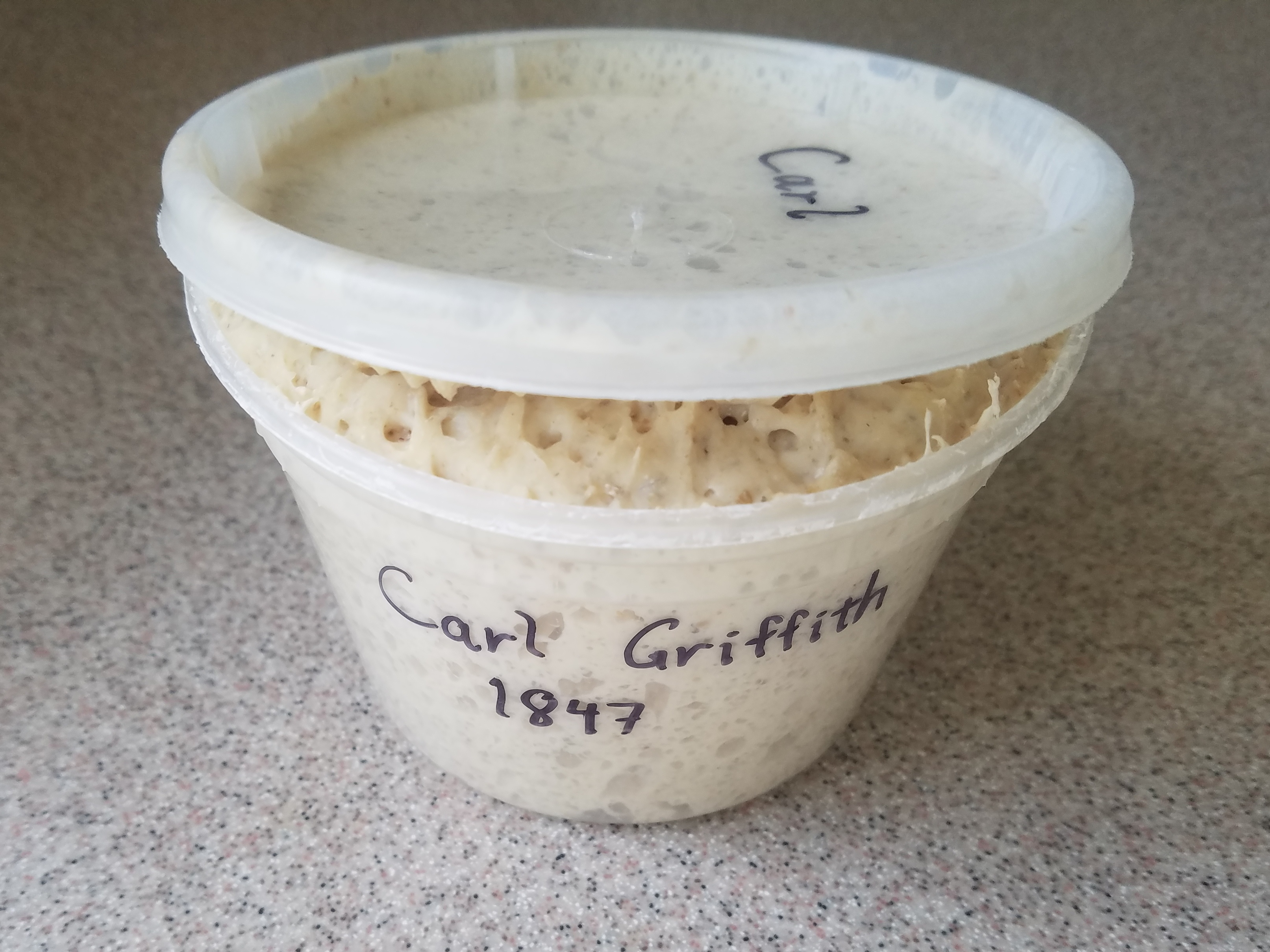
Carl Griffith's sourdough starter has pushed open the lid of its plastic tub.

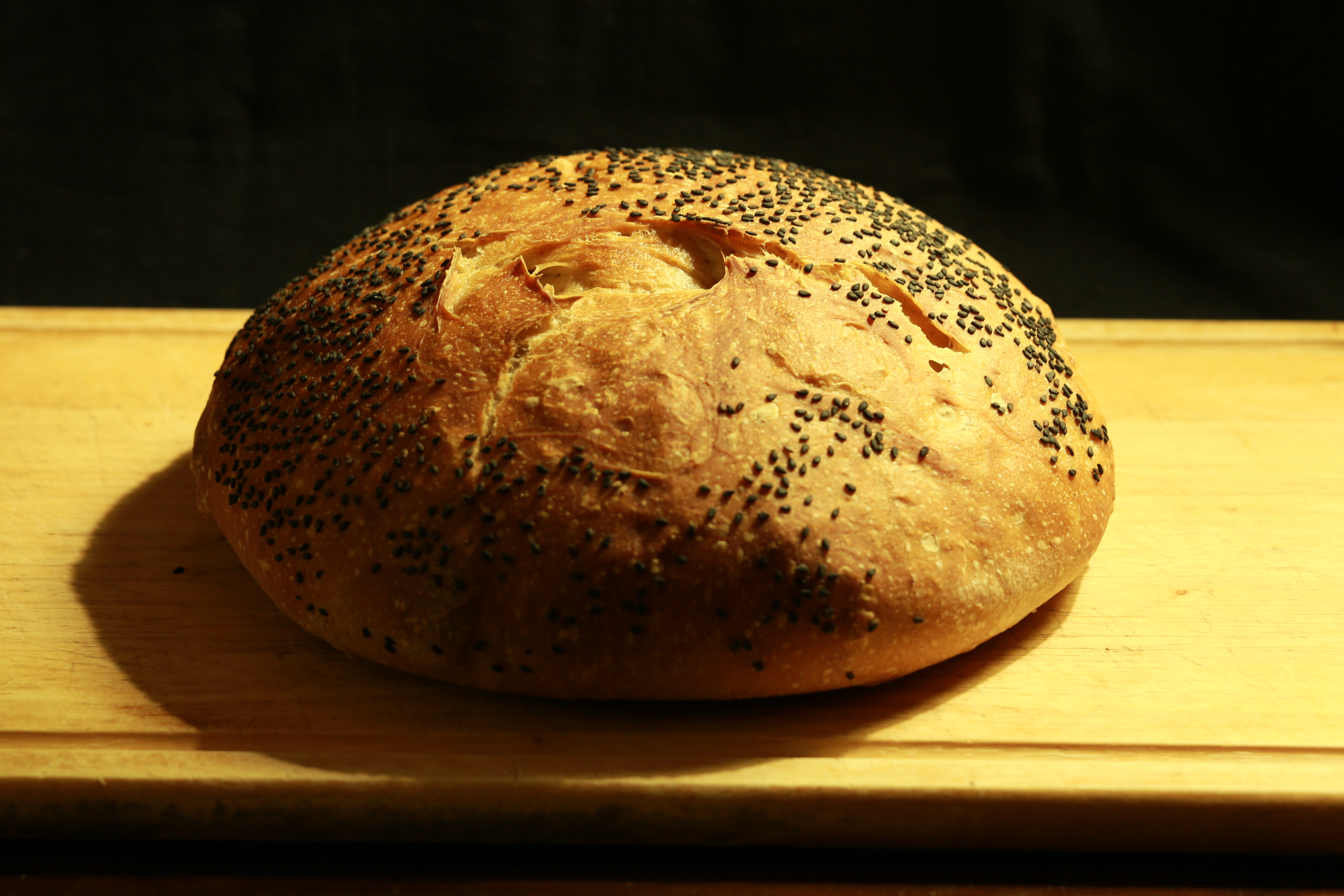
A loaf of bread baked with Carl Griffith's sourdough starter sits on a board.

Carl Griffith's sourdough starter, also known as the Oregon Trail Sourdough or Carl's starter, is a sourdough culture, a colony of wild yeast and bacteria cultivated in a mixture of flour and water for use as leavening. Carl's starter has a long history, dating back at least to 1847, when it was carried along the Oregon Trail by settlers from Missouri to Oregon. It was then passed down as an heirloom within the family of Carl Griffith, who shared it via Usenet in the 1990s. Since 2000, it has been maintained and shared by a dedicated historical preservation society; its volunteers keep the starter alive, feeding the organisms flour and water, and mail free samples worldwide on request for use by bakers in seeding their own cultures.

As with any other sourdough starter, the yeasts in Carl's starter generate carbon dioxide by fermentation when added to bread dough, causing it to rise. Bacteria of the genus Lactobacillus produce lactic acid, giving the bread a sour flavor. Carl's starter is especially robust, quick-rising, and tolerant of mistreatment, producing a consistent, reliable rise and good flavor.

== History ==
According to Carl T. Griffith, his family's sourdough culture was originally created by his great-grandmother, who traveled with her sourdough west from Missouri along the Oregon Trail in 1847, settling near Salem, Oregon. The sourdough starter was passed down to 10-year-old Carl Griffith in about 1930 in a Basque-American sheep camp. His family was building a homestead in the Steens Mountains at the time, and he baked bread in a Dutch oven in a campfire-heated pit. Griffith took his starter on cattle drives in southeastern Oregon, during which he baked in chuck wagons. Griffith went on to be a lawyer, World War II veteran, and retired lieutenant colonel of the United States Air Force Reserve.

=== Usenet ===
The starter became publicly known in the 1990s through the early Internet via Griffith's presence on Usenet's rec.food.sourdough group. Though only marginally involved in conversations among the sourdough enthusiasts, he became known for his willingness to share his family's sourdough starter. He mailed a few teaspoons of desiccated starter on request worldwide, asking for no money beyond postage, to anyone who sent him a self-addressed stamped envelope. The starter was accompanied by family recipes and instructions for reviving the dormant organisms. Establishing a new starter can be difficult for new bakers, and Griffith's consistent, good-tasting sourdough became popular in the group.

=== Carl's Friends ===
Griffith died in early 2000 at the age of 80. He had lived in Sequim, Washington, for the previous 10 years. At the time, his reputation for sharing the starter had grown by word-of-mouth; he had been responding to about 100 requests per year. As nobody in Griffith's family wished to continue growing his sourdough, the Usenet group assumed responsibility. Though none in the group had known Griffith well, Dick Adams created a website and asked for volunteers to help him. Ten friends and devotees formed the 1847 Oregon Trail Sourdough Starter Preservation Society, also known as Carl's Friends, to maintain the starter and share samples without charge.

Society volunteers grow the starter, dry it on trays into thin sheets, and grind the crumbly material into a coarse powder. At intervals of roughly a week, a volunteer mails small bags containing dried samples to requesters. By 2003 they received up to 20 requests per week, and had representatives in Australia and the UK. In 2019 the group included a chief starter grower, backup starter grower, keeper of the mailbox, and several culture keepers. In order to prevent cross-contamination, keepers of the culture are sworn to keep no other sourdough starter in their homes.

=== Modern demand ===
Over the years requests have increased in number. The group received 2,169 requests in 2018, and in 2019 the group received 30–90 requests per week. The mailing volunteer notes that the website is regularly mentioned in newspapers publishing articles on sourdough bread, increasing demand. Sourdough has in general seen rising interest since the 1990s. History is part of the appeal. "I like the throwback of traditional bread, the things our great grandmothers ate", writes professional baker Stacie Kearney. Many individual starters, including Carl's, have been passed down through generations. Sourdough baking requires minimal equipment and simple ingredients, but invites practice. Purism is a part of the appeal. In the words of one online poster, "If you take flour, water, (wild) yeast and salt, and play around with time and temperature, what comes out of the oven is something utterly transformed." Hobbyists often proudly share their work on social media.

Carl's Friends have distributed more than 54,000 samples of Griffith's sourdough starter. During the 2020 COVID-19 pandemic, increased interest in home baking drove up to 300 requests per week. Supply availability was also a factor, as other leavenings must be bought in stores, while sourdough starter can be maintained and propagated with only flour and water. Baker's yeast especially suffered supply shortages due to increased demand. One volunteer working with the society gave out over 800 active (wet) starter packets and mailed another 1,400 dry packets; her public offer resulted in people lining up outside her house.

== Microbiology ==
Ecologists at the Robb Dunn Lab of North Carolina State University analyzed a sample of Carl Griffith's starter; it was one of 560 sourdough starters surveyed for microbial diversity in the Sourdough Project. They sequenced most of the starters for their unique communities of bacteria and yeasts. They found that Griffith's starter contains Saccharomyces cerevisiae, one of the most common yeasts among their 560 starters, consistent with Griffith's starter being the ancestor to many of the other starters. The bacterial content of Griffith's starter is mostly Lactobacillus brevis, with smaller amounts of eight other members of the genus. The lactic acid produced by these bacteria is less sour than the acetic acid produced by bacteria dominant in other starters. Griffith's starter also was found to have two non-pathogenic species of Streptococcus, a genus often associated with pneumonia.

The stability of sourdough starters when moving between geographic locations remains an open question to bakers and microbiologists. Bakers anecdotally report that their starters change after they move or take it with them on vacation. It is possible therefore that the current starter is completely different from the original starter from Sequim, Washington, but society members continue regardless.
