= Amish friendship bread =

Bread or cake made from a shared sourdough starter

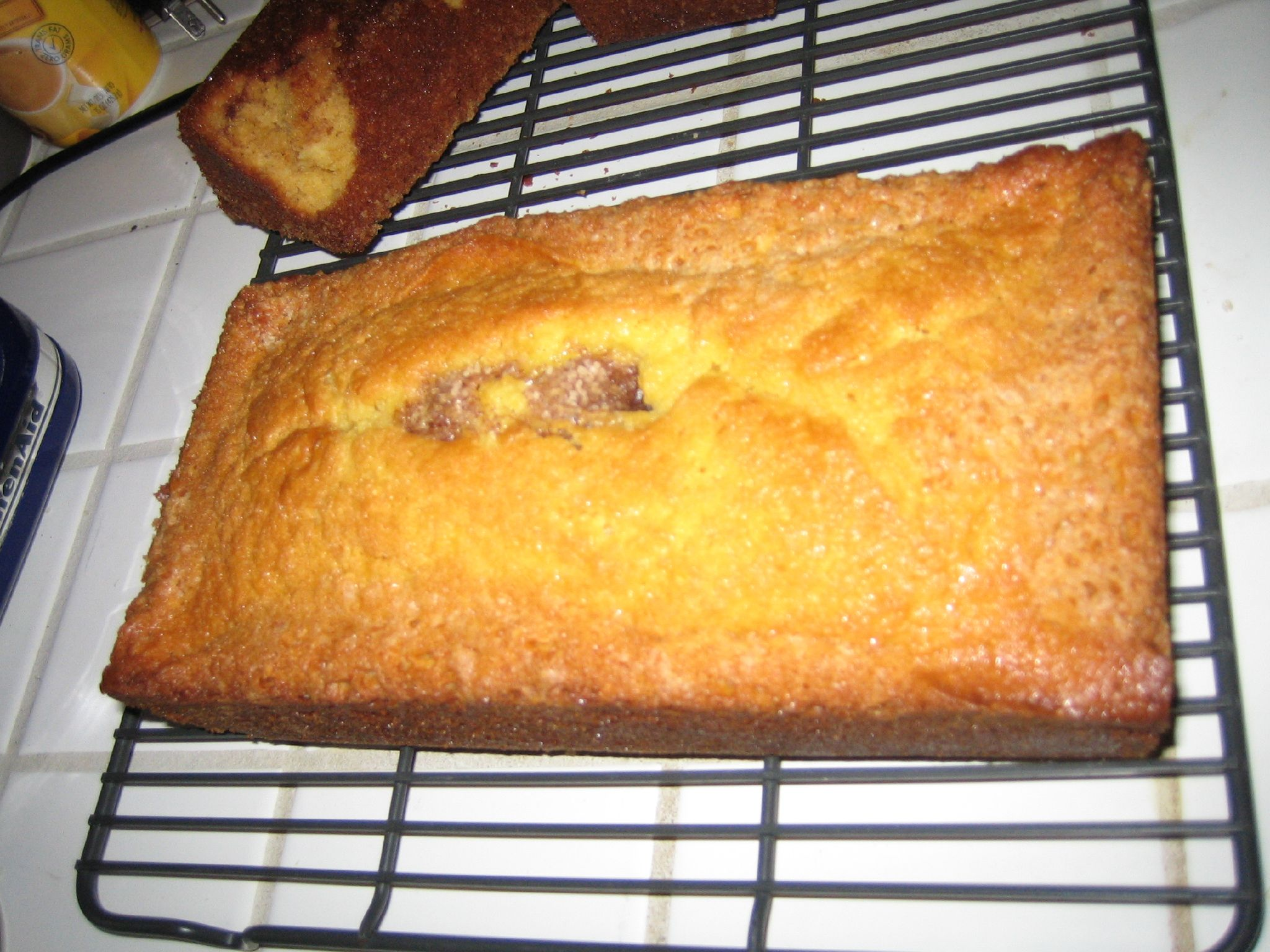
- A loaf of Amish cinnamon bread, fresh out of the oven
- Type: Sweet bread
- Place of origin: United States
- Main ingredients: Sourdough starter, sugar, vegetable oil, cinnamon

Amish friendship bread is a type of bread or cake made from a sourdough starter that is often shared in a manner similar to a chain letter. The starter is a substitute for baking yeast and can be used to make many kinds of yeast-based breads, shared with friends, or frozen for future use. The sweet, cake-like Amish cinnamon bread is a common bread that is made from this starter; it is a simple, stirred quick bread that includes a substantial amount of sugar and vegetable oil, with a mild cinnamon flavor. It has characteristics of both pound cake and coffee cake. The flavor of the finished product can be altered by cinnamon being omitted.

A common recipe using this starter suggests using one cup (240 ml) of it to make bread, keeping one cup to start a new cycle, and giving the remaining three cups to friends. One cup of starter makes one standard loaf of bread.

== History ==
In spite of the name, there is very little connection between the dish and the amish. According to Elizabeth Coblentz, a member of the Old Order Amish and the author of the syndicated column "The Amish Cook", true Amish friendship bread is "just sourdough bread that is passed around to the sick and needy".

The recipe for Amish cinnamon bread may have first been posted to the Internet in 1990, but the recipe itself is several decades old. Although the origin of Amish friendship bread is up for debate, it is similar to a cake, called Herman friendship cake, which was developed in Europe.

== Obtaining starter ==
Starter can easily be created from scratch with a package of regular baker's yeast and the ingredients that are used to maintain it. Also it is possible to create it in a baker's kitchen through wild yeasts. Typically, however, a friend shares a cup of the liquid yeast culture with people who would like to make this bread. The starter is typically maintained by adding sugar, flour and milk every few days, although any source of water and food for the yeast will work.

== Controlling the starter cycle ==
A common cycle is based on the addition of one cup each of sugar, flour, and milk every five days, with bread baked and extra starter shared every tenth day. The ten-day cycle produces five cups of starter, which must be either used to bake bread, given away, or used to start a new cycle. A common suggestion is to bake one loaf of bread, give away three cups of starter, and to save the remaining one for the next cycle.

It is not necessary to wait the canonical ten days before using one cup of starter: a cup of starter can be used as a yeast substitute at any point. However, using starter on earlier days will result in a smaller quantity of starter at the end of the cycle. To avoid running out of starter, it is normal to feed the starter (add milk, sugar, and flour) before removing a cup for use, and most recipes assume that starter is always fed immediately before being removed. A five-day baking cycle feeds the starter every fifth day and uses the resulting mixture on that day to bake one or two loaves of bread (one cup per loaf). The remaining starter is reserved to begin the next five-day fermentation cycle.

Despite common instructions to the contrary, the starter can be frozen for later use, and the cycle begun anew after thawing. The cycle can also be slowed to about half the normal fermentation rate by refrigerating the starter instead of allowing it to ferment at room temperature. Refrigeration is usually recommended if a few days' delay is desired.

== See also ==
- Biga, a stiff, dry yeast starter in the Italian style
- List of regional dishes of the United States
