= Sourdough =

Type of fermented bread

Sourdough bread
- a freshly baked sourdough bread loaf
- Type: Bread
- Main ingredients: Flour; water; sourdough culture; salt

Sourdough is a leavening agent containing naturally occurring yeast and lactobacillus bacteria. The term is used to describe bread baked with sourdough, while the sourdough itself is referred to as a starter. In addition to leavening the bread, the fermentation process produces lactic acid, which gives the bread its distinctive sour taste and improves its keeping qualities.

== History ==
Sourdough is one of the most ancient and popular forms of leavening bread. It was the standard method of breadmaking for most of human history until the Middle Ages, when it was replaced by barm. Barm, in turn, was replaced in the late 19th and early 20th centuries by industrially produced baker's yeast.

The Encyclopedia of Food Microbiology states: "One of the oldest sourdough breads dates from 3700 BC and was excavated in Switzerland, but the origin of sourdough fermentation likely relates to the origin of agriculture in the Fertile Crescent and Egypt several thousand years earlier", and "Bread production relied on the use of sourdough as a leavening agent for most of human history; the use of baker's yeast as a leavening agent dates back less than 150 years from the year of 2014". Pliny the Elder described several methods of sourdough leavening to make bread. Sourdough remained the usual form of leavening down into the European Middle Ages until being replaced by barm from the beer-brewing process, and after 1871 by purpose-cultured yeast.

French bakers brought sourdough techniques to Northern California during the California Gold Rush, and it remains a part of the culture of San Francisco today. (The nickname remains in "Sourdough Sam", the mascot of the San Francisco 49ers.) Sourdough has long been associated with the 1849 gold prospectors, though they were more likely to make bread with commercial yeast or baking soda. The "celebrated" San Francisco sourdough is a white bread characterized by a pronounced sourness, and indeed the strain of Lactobacillus in sourdough starters is named Fructilactobacillus sanfranciscensis (previously Lactobacillus sanfranciscensis), alongside the sourdough yeast Kasachstania humilis (previously Candida milleri) found in the same cultures.

The sourdough tradition was carried into the Department of Alaska in the United States and the Yukon Territory in Canada during the Klondike Gold Rush of 1898. Conventional leavenings, such as yeast and baking soda, were much less reliable in the conditions faced by the prospectors. Experienced miners and other settlers frequently carried a pouch of starter either around their neck or on a belt; these were fiercely guarded to keep them from freezing. However, freezing does not kill a sourdough starter; excessive heat does. Old hands came to be called "sourdoughs", a term that is still applied to any Alaskan or Klondike old-timer. The significance of the nickname's association with Yukon culture was immortalized in the writings of Robert Service, particularly his collection of "Songs of a Sourdough".

In English-speaking countries, where wheat-based breads predominate, sourdough is no longer the standard method for bread leavening. It was gradually replaced, first by the use of barm from beer making, then, after the confirmation of germ theory by Louis Pasteur, by cultured yeasts. Although sourdough bread was superseded in commercial bakeries in the 20th century, it has undergone a revival among artisan bakers and, more recently, in industrial bakeries. In countries where there is no legal definition of sourdough bread, the dough for some products named or marketed as such is leavened using baker's yeast or chemical raising agents as well as, or instead of, a live sourdough starter culture. The term sourfaux has been applied to such breads by the Real Bread Campaign, an initiative that has advised against the consumption of most modern breads (sourdough and otherwise) because of such preparation techniques plus the inclusion of leavening agents, such as baking soda and baking powder, which may be linked to celiac disease.

== Preparation ==
How to make and maintain firm sourdough

=== Starter ===
Sourdough leavening requires a pre-ferment (the starter or leaven, variously known as the chief, chef, head, mother, or sponge), a live mixture of flour and water, containing a colony of microorganisms including wild yeast and lactobacilli. The purpose of the starter is to produce a vigorous leavening and to develop the flavour of the bread. In practice there are several kinds of starters, as the ratio of water to flour in the starter (hydration) varies. A starter may be a liquid batter or a stiff dough.

To initially create the pre-ferment, water and flour are mixed and left in a warm place for a week or two. When wheat flour comes into contact with water, the naturally occurring enzyme amylase breaks down the starch into the sugars glucose and maltose, which sourdough's natural yeast can metabolize. With sufficient time, temperature, and refreshments with new or fresh dough, the mixture develops a stable culture. This culture will cause a dough to rise. The bacteria ferment starches that the yeast cannot metabolise, and the by-products, chiefly maltose, are metabolised by the yeast, which produces carbon dioxide gas, leavening the dough. (Note: Michael Gänzle has said Markus Brandt estimated that, in a properly maintained sourdough of sufficient age, the yeasts and lactobacilli each contribute roughly 50% of the total CO_{2}. Gänzle pointed out that while there are fewer yeasts, they are larger.)

=== Refreshment or feeding of the starter ===
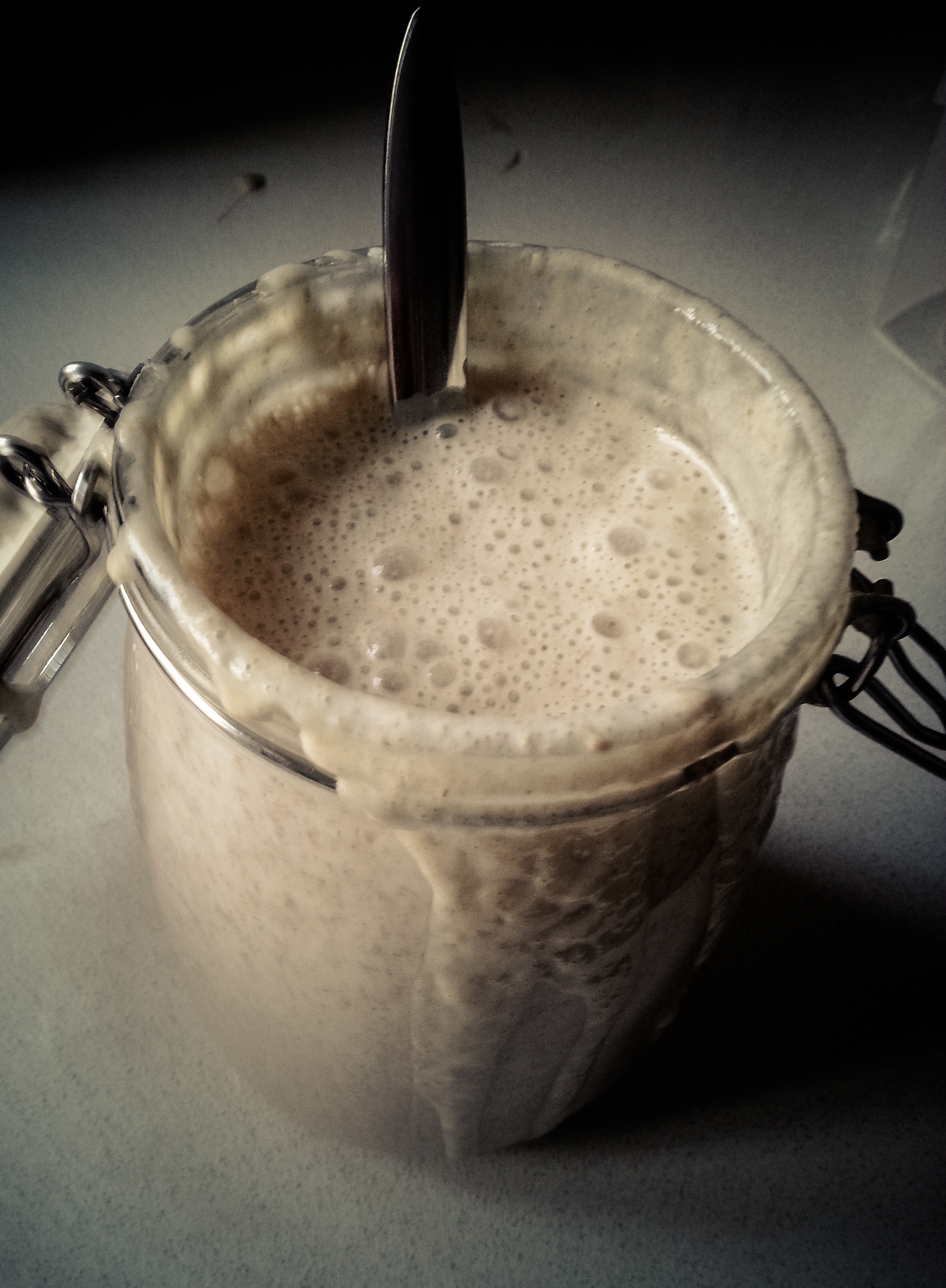
Recently refreshed sourdough

As it ferments, sometimes for several days, the volume of the starter is increased by periodic additions of flour and water, called refreshments or referred to as a feeding. As long as this starter culture is fed flour and water regularly, it will remain active.

The ratio of fermented starter to fresh flour and water is critical in the development and maintenance of a starter. This ratio is called the refreshment ratio. Higher refreshment ratios are associated with greater microbial stability in the sourdough. In San Francisco sourdough, the ratio is 40% of the total weight, which is roughly equivalent to 67% of the new-dough's weight. A high refreshment ratio keeps the pH of the refreshed dough relatively low (making it more acidic). pH levels below 4.0 inhibit lactobacilli and favor acid-tolerant yeasts.

A starter prepared from scratch with a salted wheat-rye dough takes about 54 hours at 27 °C (81 °F) to stabilise at a pH between 4.4 and 4.6. 4% salt inhibits L. sanfranciscensis, while C. milleri can withstand 8%.

A drier and cooler starter has less bacterial activity and more yeast growth, which results in the bacterial production of more acetic acid relative to lactic acid. Conversely, a wetter and warmer starter has more bacterial activity and less yeast growth, with more lactic acid relative to acetic acid. The yeasts produce mainly CO_{2} and ethanol. High amounts of lactic acid are desired in rye and mixed-rye fermentations, while relatively higher amounts of acetic acid are desired in wheat fermentations. A dry, cool starter produces a sourer loaf than a wet, warm one. Firm starters (such as the Flemish Desem starter, which may be buried in a large container of flour to prevent drying out) tend to be more resource-intensive than wet ones.

=== Intervals between refreshments ===
A stable culture in which F. sanfranciscensis is the dominant bacterium requires a temperature between 25–30 °C (77–86 °F) and refreshments every 24 hours for about two weeks (336 hours). Refreshment intervals of longer than three days acidify the dough and may change the microbial ecosystem.

The intervals between refreshments of the starter may be reduced in order to increase the rate of gas (CO_{2}) production, a process described as "acceleration." In this process, the ratio of yeasts to lactobacilli may be altered. Generally, if once-daily refreshment-intervals have not been reduced to several hours, the percentage amount of starter in the final dough should be reduced to obtain a satisfactory rise during proof.

Faster starter processes, requiring fewer refreshments, have been devised, sometimes using commercial sourdough starters as inoculants. These starters generally fall into two types. One is made from traditionally maintained and stable starter doughs, often dried, in which the ratios of microorganisms are uncertain. Another is made from microorganisms carefully isolated from petri dishes, grown into large, homogeneous populations in fermentors, and processed into combined baker's products with numerically defined ratios and known quantities of microorganisms well suited to particular bread styles.

Maintaining metabolically active sourdough with high leavening activity typically requires several refreshments per day, which is achieved in bakeries that use sourdough as sole leavening agents but not by amateur bakers that use the sourdough only weekly or even less frequently.

=== Local methods ===
Bakers have devised several ways of encouraging a stable culture of microorganisms in the starter. Unbleached, unbromated flour contains more microorganisms than more processed flours. Bran-containing (wholemeal) flour provides the greatest variety of organisms and additional minerals, though some cultures use an initial mixture of white flour and rye or whole wheat flour or "seed" the culture using unwashed organic grapes (for the wild yeasts on their skins). Grapes and grape must are also sources of lactic acid bacteria, as are many other edible plants. Basil leaves are soaked in room-temperature water for an hour to seed traditional Greek sourdough. Using water from boiled potatoes is said to increase the activity of the bacteria by providing additional starch.

The piped drinking water supplied in most urban areas is treated by chlorination or chloramination, adding small amounts of substances that inhibit potentially dangerous microorganisms but are harmless to animals. Some bakers recommend unchlorinated water for feeding cultures. Because a sourdough fermentation relies on microorganisms, using water without these agents may produce better results. Bottled drinking water is suitable; chlorine, but not chloramines, can be removed from tap water by boiling it for a time, or simply by leaving it uncovered for at least 24 hours. Chlorine and chloramines can both be removed by activated carbon filters.

Adding a small quantity of diastatic malt provides maltase and simple sugars to support the yeasts initially.

The flavor of sourdough bread varies from place to place according to the method used, the hydration of the starter and the final dough, the refreshment ratio, the length of the fermentation periods, ambient temperature, humidity, and elevation, all of which contribute to the microbiology of the sourdough.

=== Mixing and shaping the bread ===
The starter is typically fed 4 to 12 hours prior to being added to dough. Feeding means mixing flour and water into the starter. This creates an active leaven, which should grow in size and is ready to use when it is bubbly and floats in water.

A portion of the leaven is mixed with flour and water to make a final dough of the desired consistency. The starter weight is usually 13–25% of the total flour weight, though formulas may vary. Using a smaller ratio of cold unfed starter (called sourdough discard) in the range of 5% to 10% can also create good sourdough loaves; the fermentation time will be longer and can result in improved flavor.

A number of 'no knead' methods are available for sourdough bread.

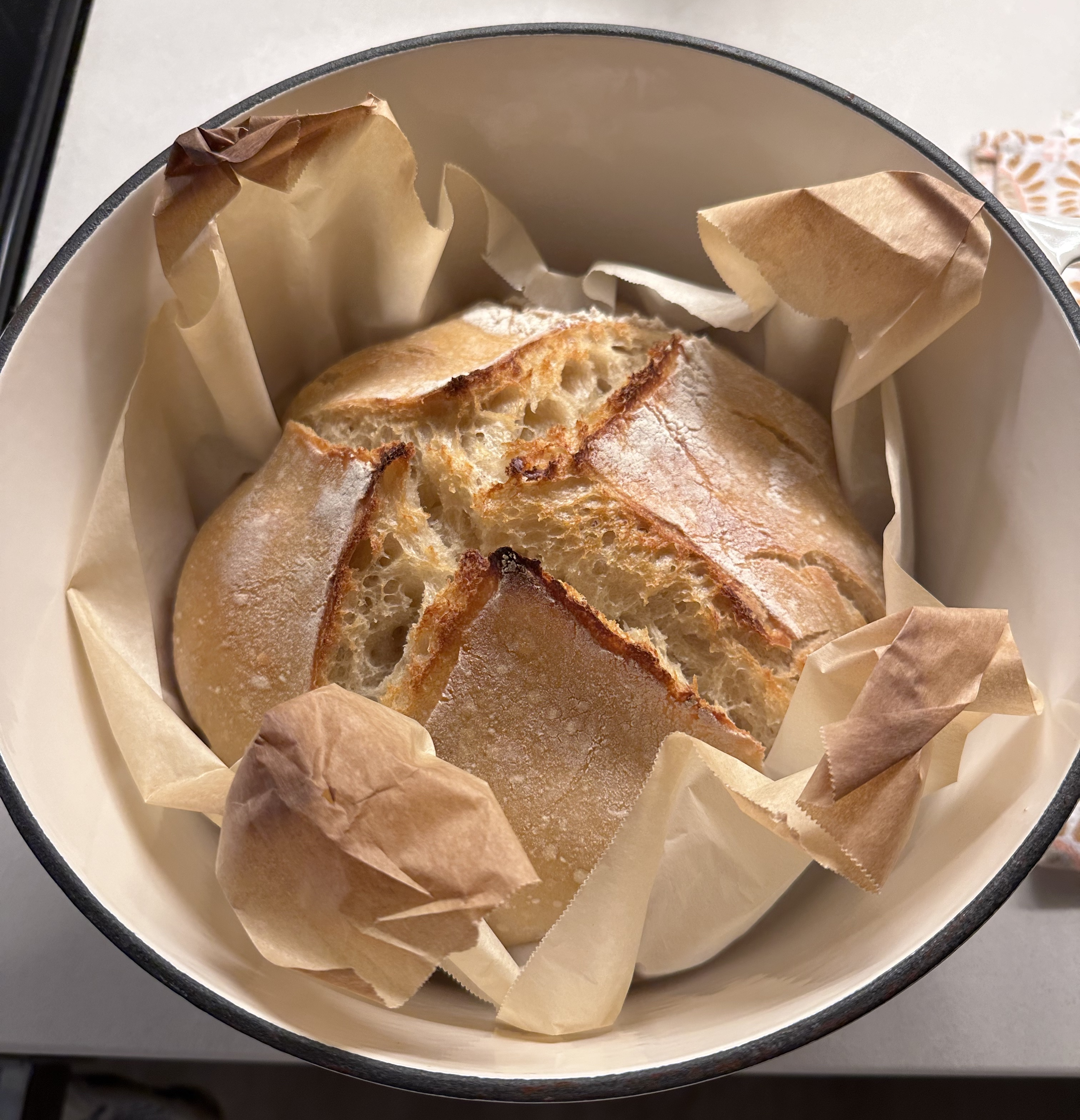
Homemade sourdough bakers commonly use cast iron dutch ovens for baking.

The dough is shaped into loaves, left to proof (the final resting period before baking), and then baked. Due to the length of time sourdough bread takes to proof, many bakers may refrigerate their loaves prior to baking. This process is known as retardation to slow down the proofing process. This process has the added benefit of developing a richer flavoured bread.

Obtaining a satisfactory rise from sourdough takes longer than a dough leavened with baker's yeast because the yeast in a sourdough is less vigorous. In the presence of lactic acid bacteria, however, some sourdough yeasts have been observed to produce twice the gas of baker's yeast. The acidic conditions in sourdough, along with the bacteria also producing enzymes that break down proteins, result in weaker gluten and may produce a denser finished product.

Because the rise time of most sourdough starters is longer than that of breads made with baker's yeasts, traditional sourdough starters are generally unsuitable for use in a bread machine. However, bread machine manufacturers may offer recipes specifically optimized for their devices, with the starter made directly in the machine's pan using a dedicated setting and then supplemented later with ingredients such as apple cider vinegar. Also, sourdough that has been proofed over many hours, using a sourdough starter or mother dough, may be transferred to a bread machine to be used only with the baking segment of the bread-making program, bypassing the timed mechanical kneading by the machine's paddle. This may be convenient for single loaf production, but the complex blistered and slashed crust characteristics of oven-baked sourdough bread cannot be achieved in a bread making machine, as this usually requires the use of a baking stone in the oven and misting of the dough to produce steam.

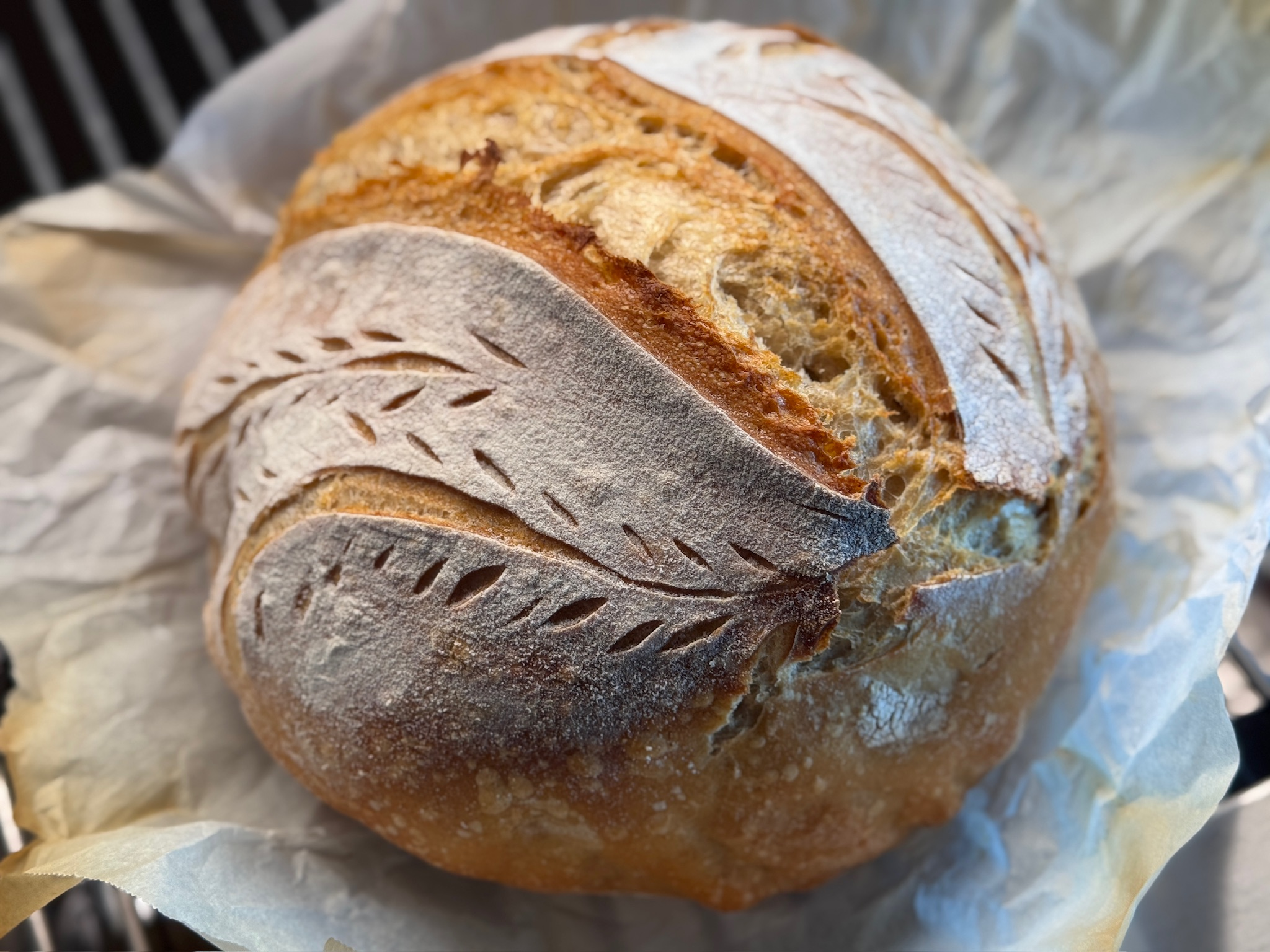
A sourdough loaf featuring both deep and decorative scoring

In sourdough baking, one or more deep primary cuts are often made to allow controlled expansion during oven spring, and additional shallow slashes are added for decorative effect.

Once baked, sourdough products keep fresh for a longer time than many other breads, and are good at resisting spoilage and mold without the additives required to retard spoiling of other types of bread.

=== Continuing the cycle ===
Bakers almost never make a new starter every time they bake. They generally maintain an unbroken line of starter from the original first batch. This line is called the mother dough, (Note: The term mother dough sometimes refers to a yeast sponge, so one must look at the ingredients and process to understand if it is a multi-refreshment sourdough or instead a sponge made from only fresh ingredients.) mother sponge, chef, or seed sour), There are two ways to continue the sourdough cycle after the bread dough is mixed.

The first simply reserves a portion of the starter culture for another day. Because of their pH level and the presence of antibacterial agents, such cultures are stable and able to prevent colonization by unwanted yeasts and bacteria, and the original starter culture may be many years old. Flour, water, and sometimes other ingredients (e.g., sugar, milk, apples, potatoes) are stirred in to the reserved portion to feed it. A portion of this starter is used on subsequent days for baking more bread, while always saving some for future use.

The other approach is the French-style levain technique. Instead of preserving a portion of the sourdough starter, it preserves a portion of raw, unbaked bread dough. The next day, the dough is put into a bowl with the other ingredients for a loaf of bread. Before shaping and baking the new loaf, a portion is pulled out and set aside so that it will be available to leaven the next batch of dough.

== Biology and chemistry ==
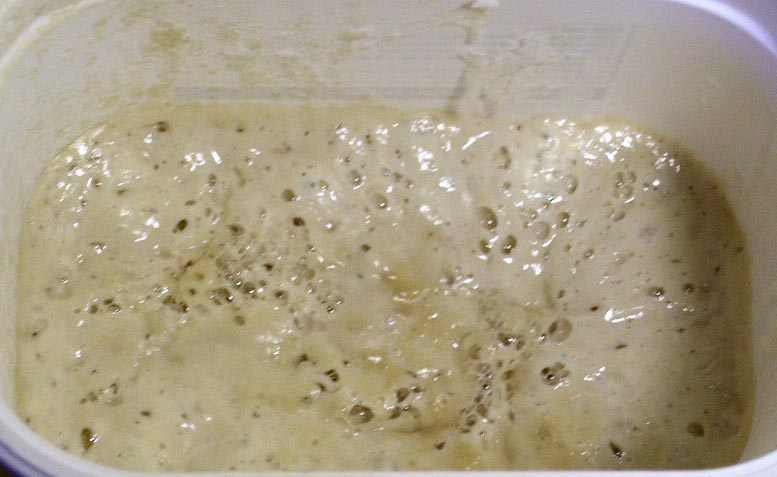
Sourdough starter made with flour and liquid refreshed for three or more days

Sourdough is a stable culture of lactic acid bacteria and yeast in a mixture of flour and water. Broadly speaking, the yeast produces gas (carbon dioxide) which leavens the dough, and the lactic acid bacteria produce lactic acid, which contributes flavor in the form of sourness. The lactic acid bacteria metabolize sugars that the yeast cannot, while the yeast metabolizes the by-products of lactic acid fermentation. During sourdough fermentation, many cereal enzymes, particularly phytases, proteases and pentosanases, are activated through acidification and contribute to biochemical changes during sourdough fermentation.

=== Lactic acid bacteria ===
Every starter consists of different lactic acid bacteria which are introduced to the starter through the environment, water, and flour used to create the starter. The lactic acid bacteria are a group of gram-positive bacteria capable of converting carbohydrate substrates into organic acids and producing a wide range of metabolites. Organic acids, including propionic, formic, acetic acid, and lactic acid, create an unfavorable environment for the growth of spoilage and pathogenic microorganisms.

Lactic acid bacteria commonly found in sourdough include Leuconostoc, Pediococcus, Weissella and other genera. The most prevalent species belong to the very large and diverse genus Lactobacillus.

Lactic acid bacteria are a group comprising aerotolerant anaerobes, meaning anaerobes that can multiply in the presence of oxygen, and microaerophiles, meaning microbes that multiply at levels of oxygen lower than atmospheric.

Major lactic acid bacteria in sourdough are heterofermentative (producing more than one product) organisms and convert hexoses by the phosphoketolase pathway to lactate, CO_{2} and acetate or ethanol; heterofermentative lactic acid bacteria are usually associated with homofermentative (producing mainly one product) lactobacilli, particularly Lactobacillus and Companilactobacillus species.

=== Yeasts ===
The most common yeast species in sourdough are Kazachstania exigua (Saccharomyces exiguus), Saccharomyces cerevisiae, K. exiguus and K. humilis (previously Candida milleri or Candida humilis).

=== Type I sourdough ===
Traditional sourdoughs used as sole leavening agent are referred to as Type I sourdough; examples include sourdoughs used for San Francisco Sourdough Bread, Panettone, and rye bread. Type I sourdoughs are generally firm doughs, have a pH range of 3.8 to 4.5, and are fermented in a temperature range of 20 to 30 °C (68 to 86 °F). Fructilactobacillus sanfranciscensis was named for its discovery in San Francisco sourdough starters, though it is not endemic to San Francisco. F. sanfranciscensis and Limosilactobacillus pontis often highlight a lactic-acid bacterial flora that includes Limosilactobacillus fermentum, Fructilactobacillus fructivorans, Levilactobacillus brevis, and Companilactobacillus paralimentarius. The yeasts Saccharomyces exiguus, Kasachstania humilis, or Candida holmii usually populate sourdough cultures symbiotically with Fructilactobacillus sanfranciscensis. The yeast S. exiguus is related to the yeasts C. milleri and C. holmii. Torulopsis holmii, Torula holmii, and S. rosei are synonyms used prior to 1978. C. milleri and C. holmii are physiologically similar, but DNA testing established them as distinct. Other yeasts reported found include C. humilis, C. krusei, Pichia anomala, C. peliculosa, P. membranifaciens, and C. valida. There have been changes in the taxonomy of yeasts in recent decades. F. sanfranciscensis requires maltose, while C. milleri is maltase negative and thus cannot consume maltose. C. milleri can grow under conditions of low pH and relatively high acetate levels, a factor contributing to sourdough flora's stability.

In order to produce acetic acid, F. sanfrancisensis needs maltose and fructose. Wheat dough contains abundant starch and some polyfructosanes, which enzymes degrade to "maltose, fructose and little glucose." The terms "fructosan, glucofructan, sucrosyl fructan, polyfructan, and polyfructosan" are all used to describe a class of compounds that are "structurally and metabolically" related to sucrose, where "carbon is stored as sucrose and polymers of fructose (fructans)." Yeasts have the ability to free fructose from glucofructans which compose about 1–2% of the dough. Glucofructans are long strings of fructose molecules attached to a single glucose molecule. Sucrose can be considered the shortest glucofructan, with only a single fructose molecule attached. When L. sanfrancisensis reduces all available fructose, it stops producing acetic acid and begins producing ethanol. If the fermenting dough gets too warm, the yeasts slow down, producing less fructose. Fructose depletion is more of a concern in doughs with lower enzymatic activities.

A Belgian study of wheat and spelt doughs refreshed once every 24 hours and fermented at 30 °C (86 °F) in a laboratory environment provides insight into the three-phase evolution of first-generation-to-stable sourdough ecosystems. In the first two days of refreshment, atypical genera Enterococcus and Lactococcus bacteria highlighted the doughs. During days 2–5, sourdough-specific bacteria belonging to the genera Lactobacillus, Pediococcus, and Weissella outcompete earlier strains. Yeasts grew more slowly and reached population peaks near days 4–5. By days 5–7, "well-adapted" Lactobacillus strains such as L. fermentum and Lactiplantibacillus plantarum had emerged. At their peaks, yeast populations were in the range of about 1–10% of the lactobacilli populations or 1:10–1:100. One characteristic of a stable dough is that the heterofermentative have outcompeted homofermentative lactobacilli. F. sanfranciscensis has typically not been identified in spontaneous sourdoughs, even after multiple cycles of back-slopping; it was rapidly introduced in wheat sourdoughs, however, when plant materials were used to start the fermentation.

Investigations of wheat sourdough found that S. cerevisiae died off after two refreshment cycles. S. cerevisiae has less tolerance to acetic acid than other sourdough yeasts. Continuously maintained, stable sourdough cannot be unintentionally contaminated by S. cerevisiae.

=== Type II sourdough ===
In Type II sourdoughs, baker's yeast or Saccharomyces cerevisiae is added to leaven the dough; L. pontis and Limosilactobacillus panis in association with Lactobacillus species are dominant members of Type II sourdoughs. They have a pH less than 3.5, and are fermented within a temperature range of 30 to 50 °C (86 to 122 °F) for several days without feedings, which reduces the flora's activity. This process was adopted by some in industry, in part, due to simplification of the multiple-step build typical of Type I sourdoughs.

In Type II sourdoughs, yeast growth is slowed or stopped due to higher fermentation temperatures. These doughs are more liquid and once fermented may be chilled and stored for up to a week. They are pumpable and used in continuous bread production systems.

=== Type III sourdough ===
Type III sourdoughs are Type II sourdoughs subjected to a drying process, usually either spray or drum drying, and are mainly used at an industrial level as flavoring agents. They are dominated by "drying-resistant [lactic acid bacteria] such as Pediococcus pentosaceus, L. plantarum, and L. brevis." The drying conditions, time and heat applied, may be varied in order to influence caramelization and produce desired characteristics in the baked product.

Manufacturers of non-sourdough breads make up for the lack of yeast and bacterial culture by introducing into their dough an artificially made mix known as bread improver or flour improver.

== Types of bread ==
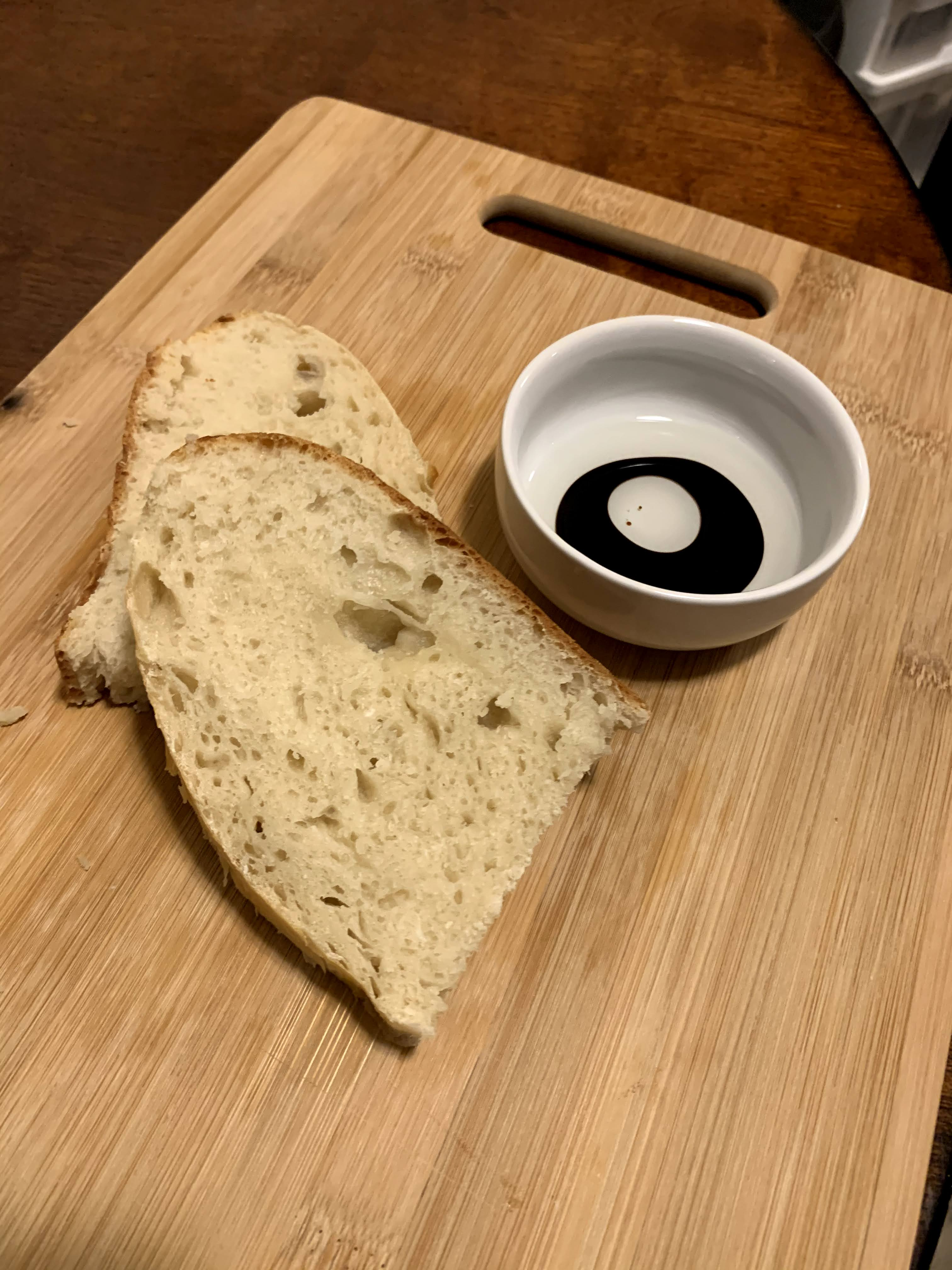
Slices of sourdough bread paired with vinegar and oil for dipping

There are many breads that use techniques similar to that used in the making of sourdough bread. Danish rugbrød (rye bread) is a dense, dark bread best known from its use in the Danish smørrebrød (open-faced sandwiches). The Mexican birote salado started out in the city of Guadalajara as a short French baguette that replaces the yeast with a sourdough fermentation process, yielding a bread that is crunchy outside but soft and savory inside. Amish friendship bread uses a sourdough starter that includes sugar and milk. It is also leavened with baking powder and baking soda. An Amish sourdough is fed with sugar and potato flakes every 3–5 days. German pumpernickel is traditionally made from a sourdough starter, although modern pumpernickel loaves often use commercial yeasts, sometimes spiked with citric acid or lactic acid to inactivate the amylases in the rye flour. Flemish desem bread (the word means 'starter') is a whole-wheat sourdough. Whole-wheat sourdough flatbreads are traditionally eaten in Azerbaijan. In Ethiopia, teff flour is fermented to make injera. A similar variant is eaten in Somalia, Djibouti, and Yemen (where it is known as lahoh). In India, idlis and dosa are made from a sourdough fermentation of rice and black gram.

== Possible fermentation effects ==
Sourdough bread has a relatively low glycemic index compared with other types of bread. The activity of cereal enzymes during sourdough fermentation hydrolyses phytates, which improves the absorption of some dietary minerals and vitamins, most of which are found in the bran.

Sourdough fermentation reduces wheat components that may contribute to non-celiac wheat sensitivity and irritable bowel syndrome. Sourdough fermentation and lactic acid bacteria may be useful to improve the quality of gluten-free breads, such as by enhancing texture, aroma, and shelf life.

A review of the health effects of sourdough published in 2023 concluded that: "...although a broad range of sourdough related health benefits are praised in publications, social media and by bakers, a sound evidence base for measurable effects on health related clinical endpoints has not been established".

== Modern culture ==
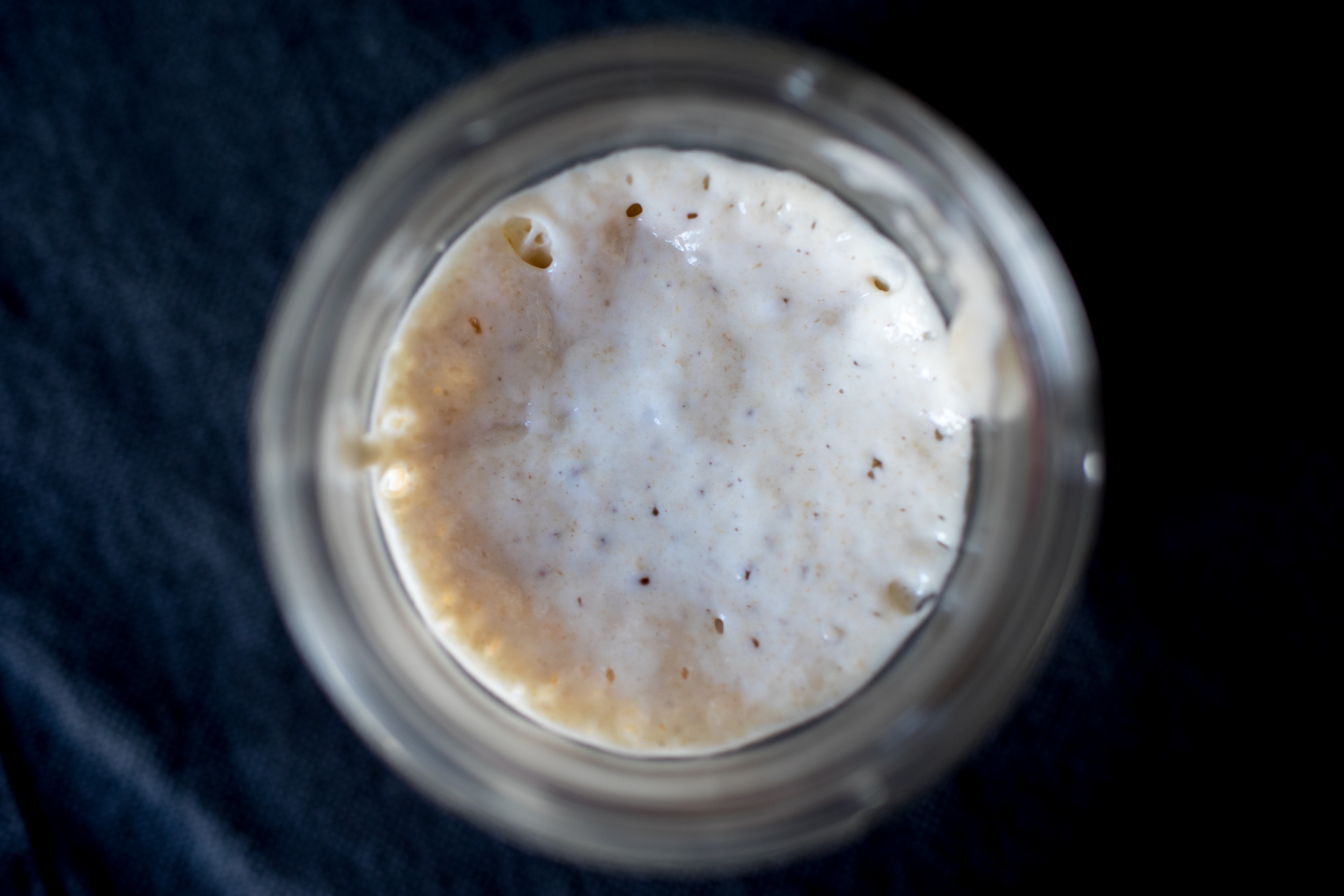
Sourdough starter

Sourdough baking has a devoted community today. Many devotees share starters and tips via the Internet. Hobbyists often share their work on social media. Sourdough cultures contain communities of living organisms, with a history unique to each individual starter, and bakers can feel an obligation to maintain them. The different yeasts present in the air in any region also enter sourdough, causing starters to change depending on location.

Some devotees find interest in history. Sourdough expert Ed Wood isolated millennia-old yeast from an ancient Egyptian bakery near the pyramids of Giza, and many individual starters, such as Carl Griffith's 1847 starter, have been passed down through generations. "I like the throwback of traditional bread, the things our great grandmothers ate," writes professional baker Stacie Kearney. Some bakers describe starters that are generations old, though Griffith's seems exceptional.

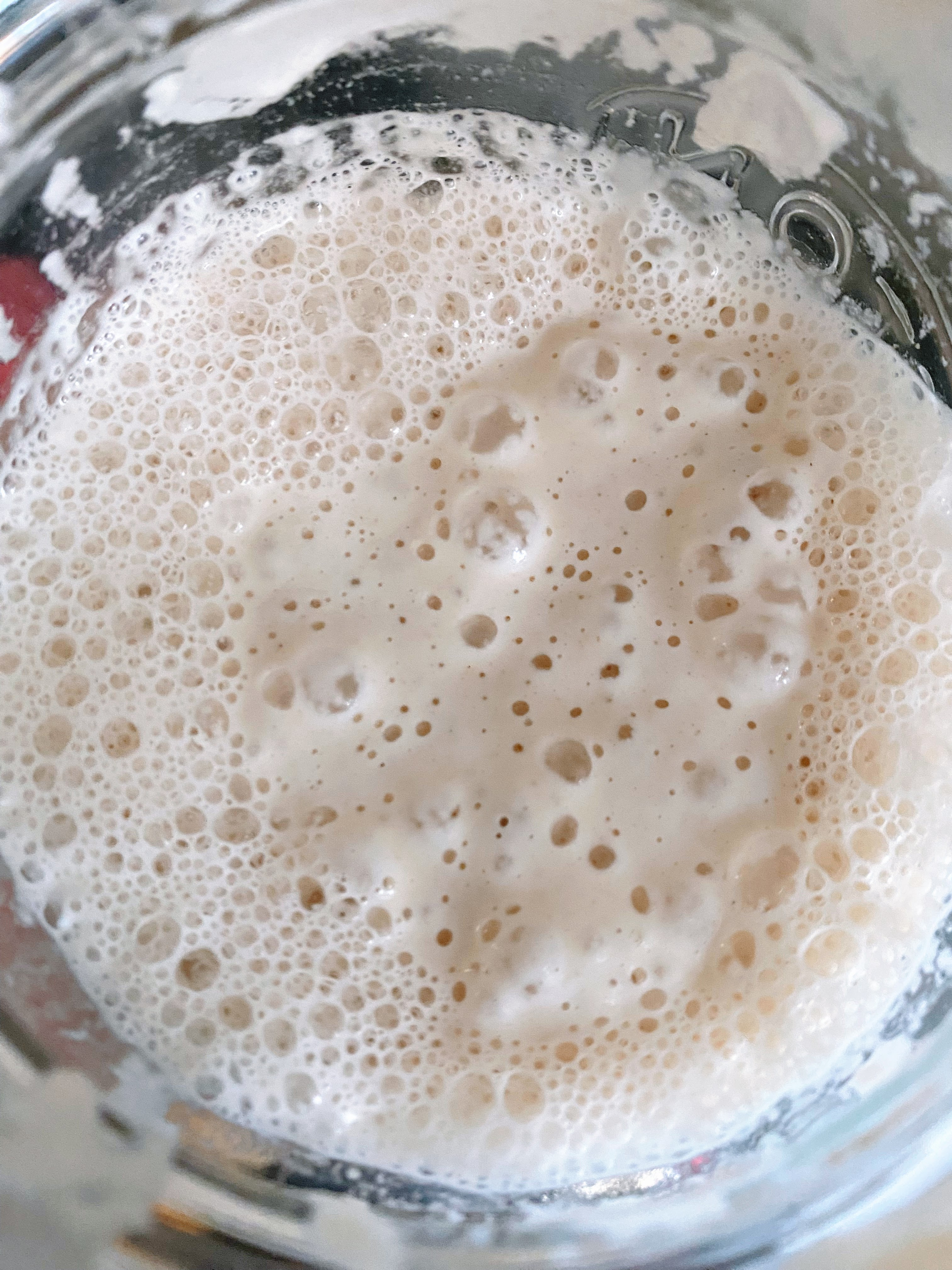
Bubbly active starter

Sourdough baking became more popular during the COVID-19 pandemic, as increased interest in home baking caused shortages of baker's yeast in stores, whereas sourdough can be propagated at home.

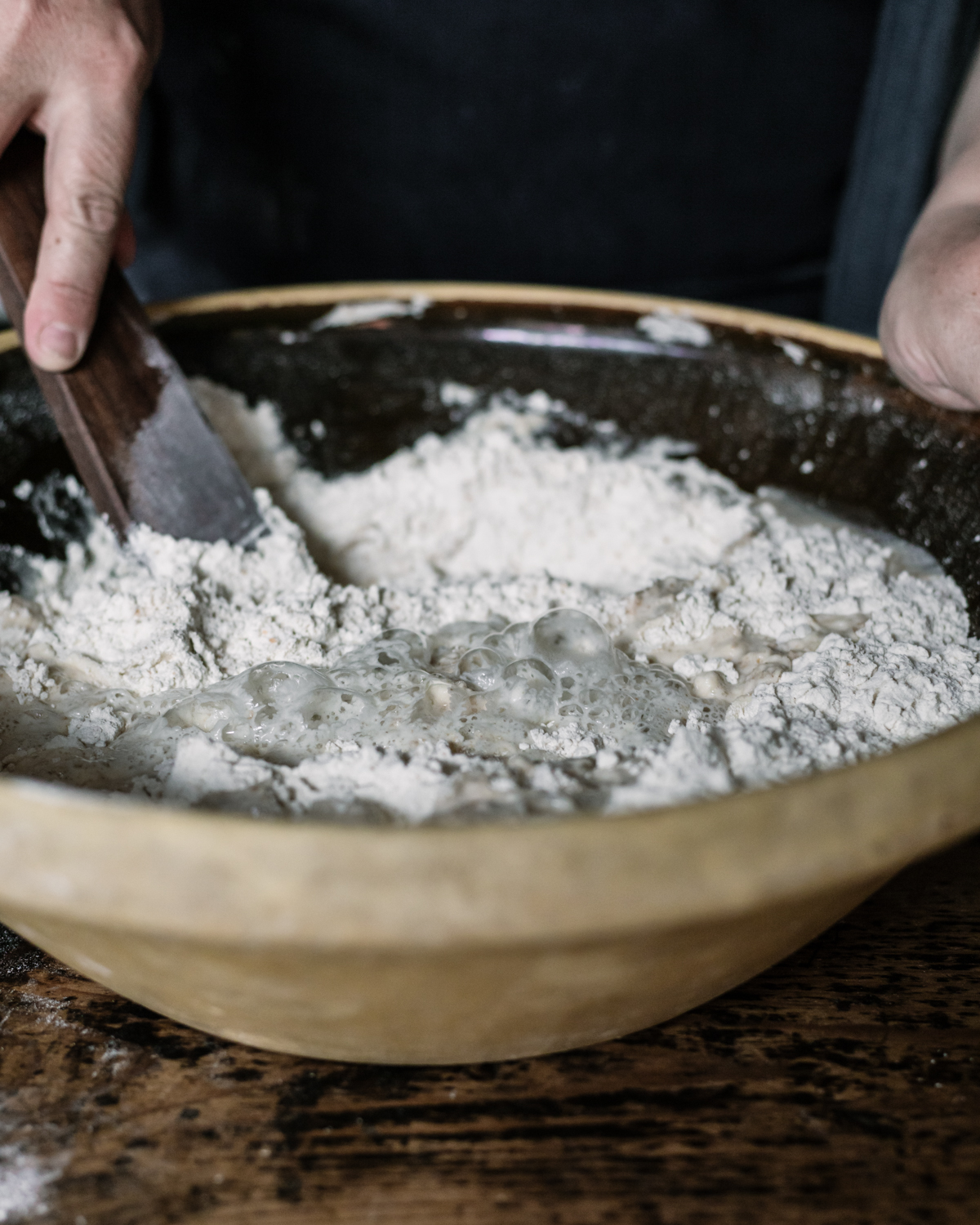
Mixing bread using sourdough starter

Sourdough baking requires minimal equipment and simple ingredients – flour, salt, and water – but invites practice. Purism is a part of the appeal for some people. As described by one enthusiast, "If you take flour, water, (wild) yeast and salt, and play around with time and temperature, what comes out of the oven is something utterly transformed." Many bakers feed their starters on elaborate schedules, and many name them. Some approach sourdough as science, attempting to optimize flavor and acidity with careful measurements, experimentation, and correspondence with professional microbiologists. Some lineages of starter are freely shared, and others can be purchased, but many prefer to cultivate their own. Some techniques for doing so are fiercely debated, such as the use of commercial yeast to jump-start a culture while capturing wild yeasts, or adding grapes or milk.

=== Regional preferences ===
In northern Europe, where bread made from 100% rye flour is popular, bread is typically leavened with sourdough rather than baker's yeast because rye lacks sufficient gluten to support yeast leavening. Instead, rye bread's structure relies on the starch in the flour and other carbohydrates known as pentosans. However, rye amylase remains active at higher temperatures than wheat amylase, which can cause the bread's structure to weaken as the starches break down during baking. The lowered pH of a sourdough starter inactivates the amylases when heat alone cannot, allowing the carbohydrates to gel and set properly in the bread structure.

In southern Europe, sourdough remains traditional for certain breads like panettone. However, in the 20th century, sourdough became less common, replaced by the faster-acting baker's yeast. Sometimes, this yeast is supplemented with longer fermentation periods to allow some bacterial activity, which adds flavor. During the 2010s, sourdough fermentation regained popularity as a major method in bread production, often used alongside baker's yeast as a leavening agent.

== See also ==
- List of sourdough breads
- Biga, a pre-fermentation technique in Italian baking
- Herman cake
- History of California bread
- Injera
- Kyselo, Czech soup made from sourdough
- List of microorganisms found in sourdough
- Salt-rising bread
- Sour mash
- Sour rye soup, Polish soup (żurek) made with rye flour soured in the same process that occurs in the forming of sourdough
