= Pão de Mafra =

Portuguese bread from Mafra

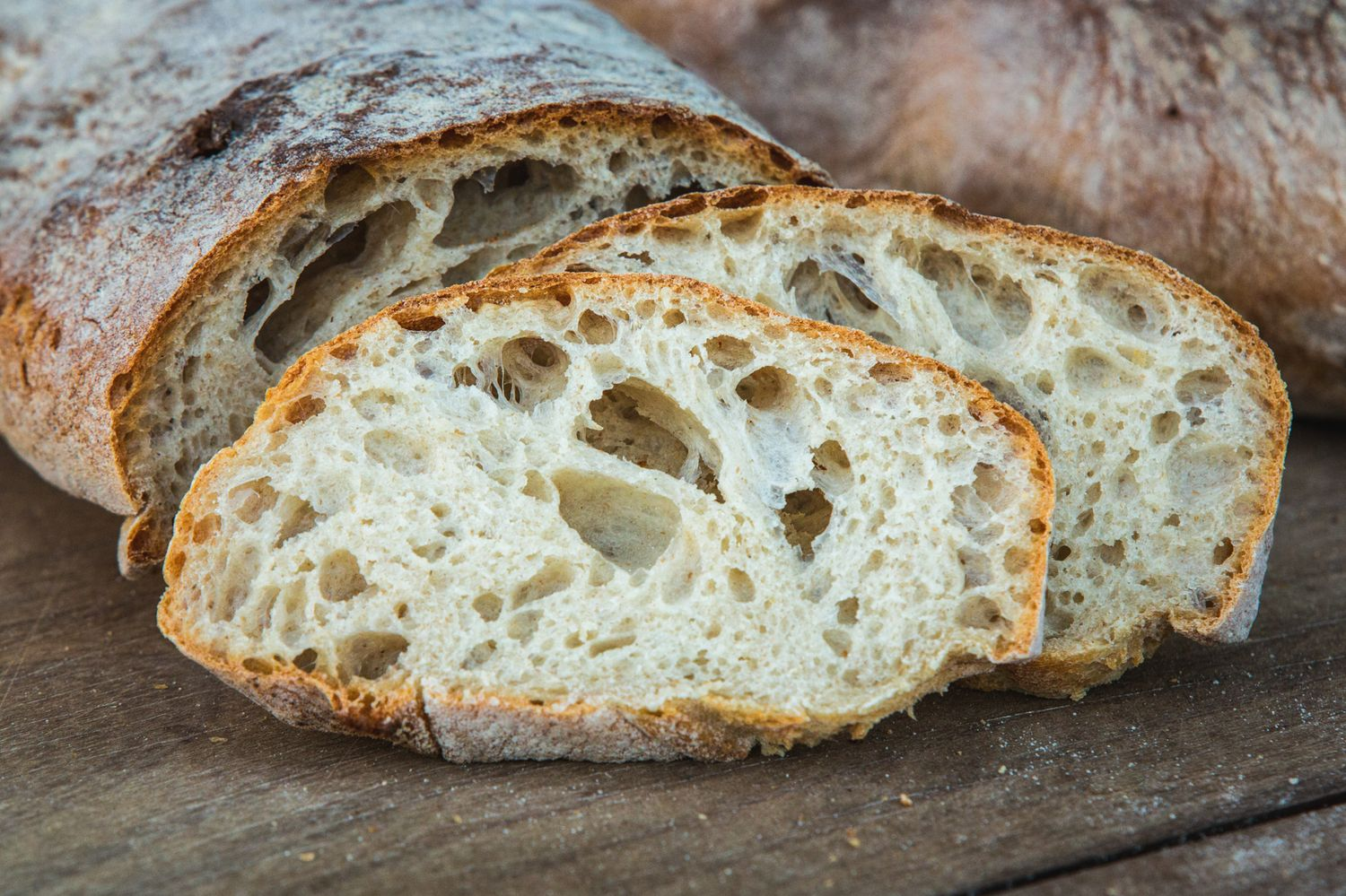
- Showing the irregular crumb structure of pão de Mafra
- Alternative names: Saloio (antiquated)
- Type: Bread
- Place of origin: Portugal
- Region or state: Mafra
- Main ingredients: Wheat and rye flour, water, yeast or sourdough starter, salt
- Similar dishes: Ciabatta

Pão de Mafra is an historical bread particular to Mafra, Portugal. It is derived from the pão saloio, a common staple bread made since the Middle Ages. Historically, pão de Mafra was a domestic bread made at home until the middle of the 20th century.

Pão de Mafra is an oblong, rather flat loaf. It is commonly eaten plain, with butter or jam, hams and cheeses, for sandwiches, or as an accompaniment to other dishes such as soups, stews, and grilled dishes.

== History ==
Mafra is a municipality 40 km outside of Lisbon, located on the western coast bordering the Atlantic Ocean. Due to its location, the local grains and cereals prevalent to the area has a unique taste characterized as intense and slightly salty, produced by the strong winds carried from the sea. In addition, the flour locally milled in the area is not as refined compared to the French-style bread that was typically found in Lisbon in the past. However, the distinct taste of rural breads from Mafra was noticed by vegetable merchants visiting from Lisbon who would distinguish it favorably from other pão saloio (lit. 'peasant bread').

In 2008, a scientific study carried out by Patrícia Silva Ribeiro from the Instituto Superior de Agronomia at the University of Lisbon, concluded that breads from Mafra were truly distinct from other breads of neighboring regions―Sintra, Loures, and Alentejo. Ribeiro observed that pão de Mafra had higher mixing times, lower fermentation times and levels of yeast used compared to the other breads. This study was used in the application for the Protected Geographical Indication (PGI) status in 2010.

Currently, the Association of Commerce, Industry and Services of the Municipality of Mafra (ACISM) lists seven bakeries it desires to attribute with the Protected Geographical Indication (PGI) designation to their pão de Mafra. In 2012, pão de Mafra was a registered trademark to combat counterfeiting.

== Preparation ==
Pão de Mafra is made with a blend of T80 wheat flour and T170 rye flour, water, yeast, and salt. Compared to other breads, it has less yeast and a higher level of hydration, normally above 80%. Although it undergoes bulk fermention and a second proofing after shaping, it generally has a shorter fermentation time. It is often baked in a traditional masonry wood oven with steam. The result is a slightly sweet bread with low acidity, a crisp, tough crust, and a varying, open crumb structure. The humidity of a finished loaf is between 32% and 40%. It is comparable to ciabatta of Italy.

== Gallery ==
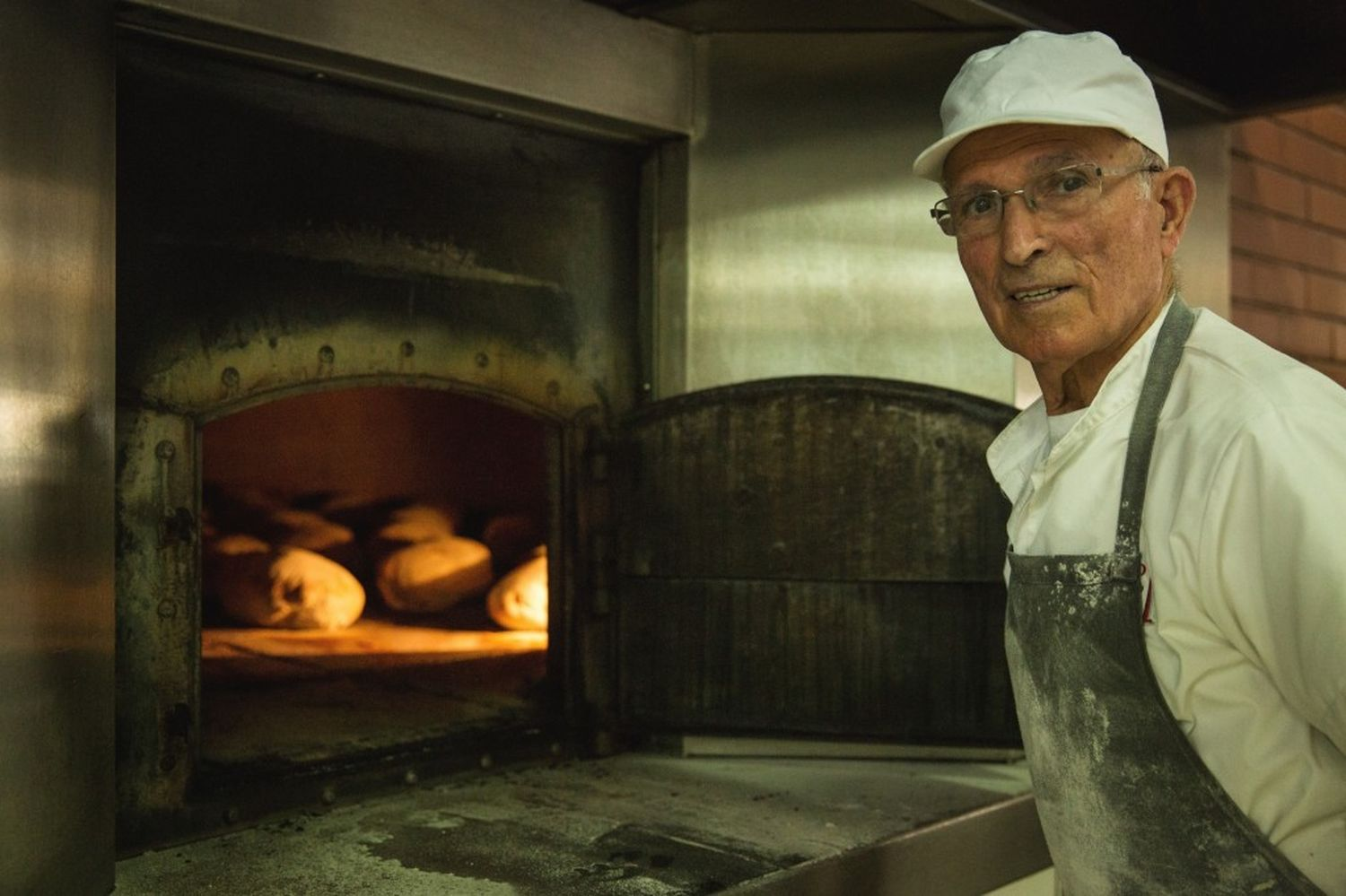
Baker

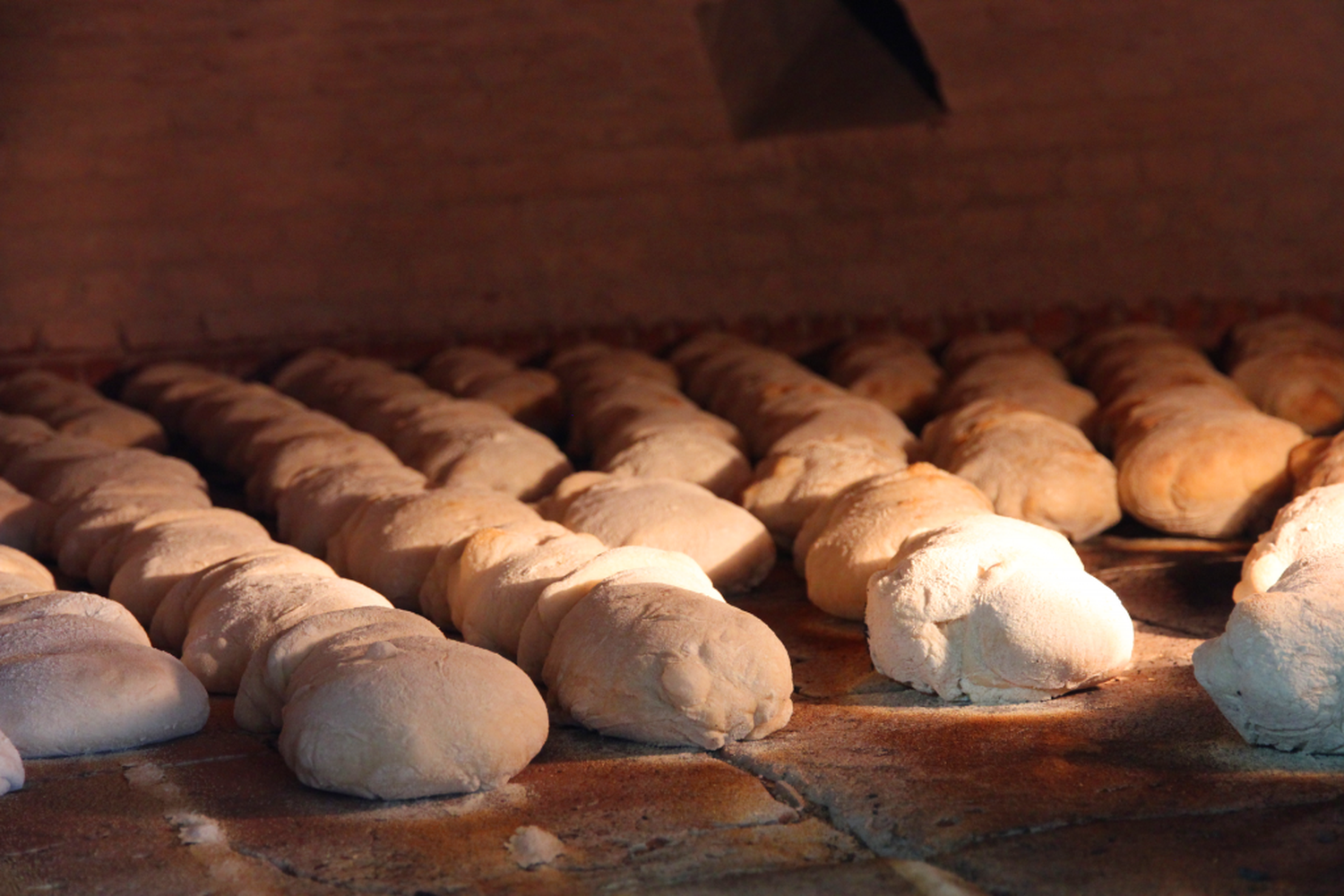
In oven

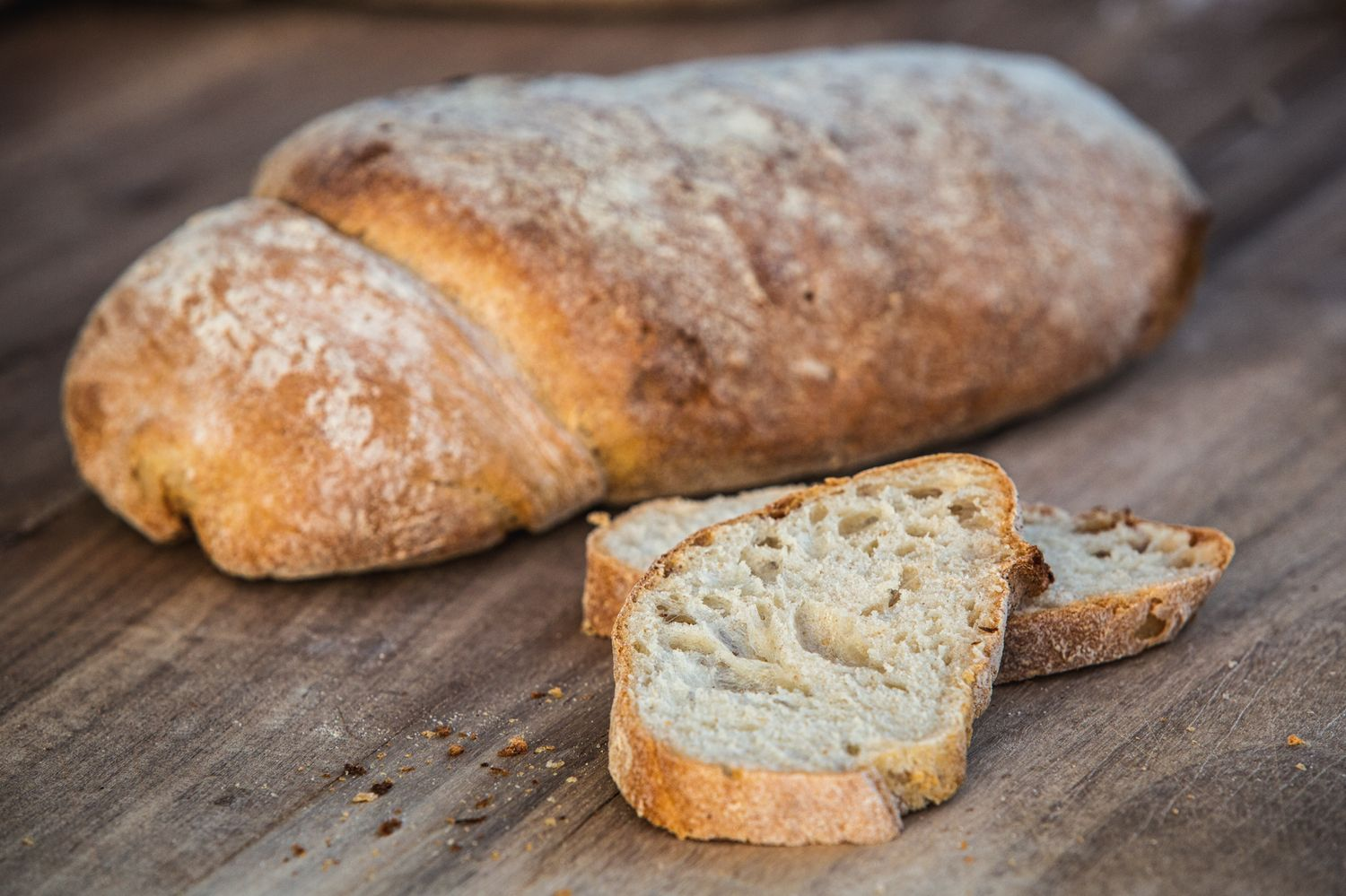
Finished loaf and slice

== See also ==
- Portuguese Cuisine – Culinary traditions of Portugal
- Portuguese sweet bread – Various Portuguese sweet breads
