= French bread (disambiguation) =

French bread or baguette is a long, thin, white bread made in the French style.

French bread may also refer to:

- List of French breads, consisting of breads that originated in France
  - French-style rustic bread
- Marraqueta, a South American white bread roll
- French-Bread, a Japanese video game developer
- Pão francês, a Brazilian bread roll
