= List of French breads =

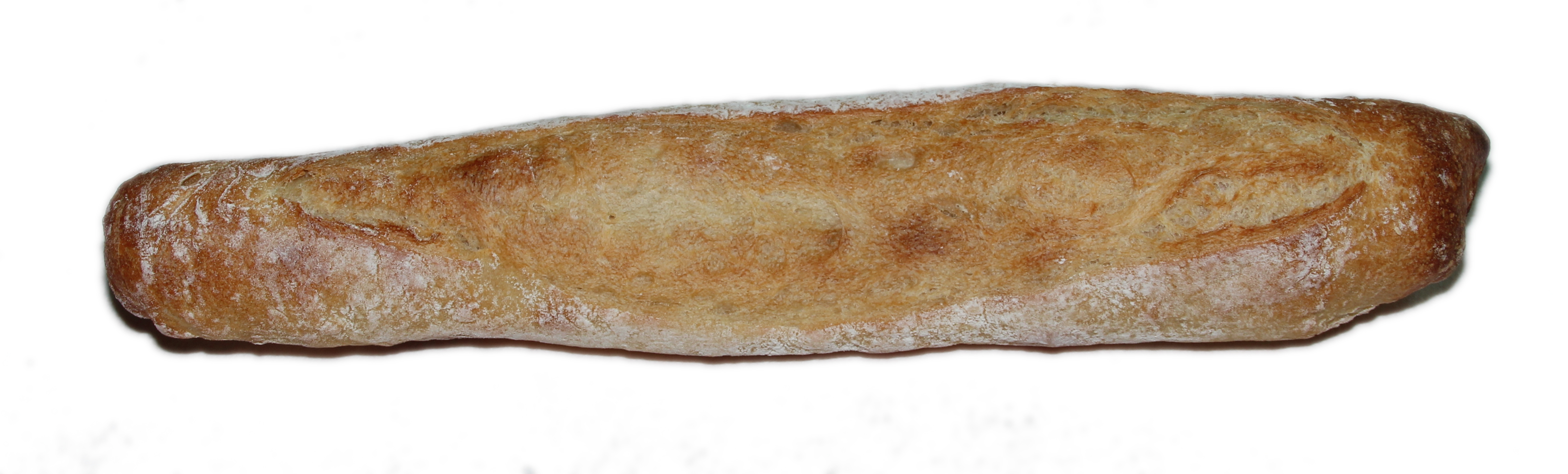
Baguette

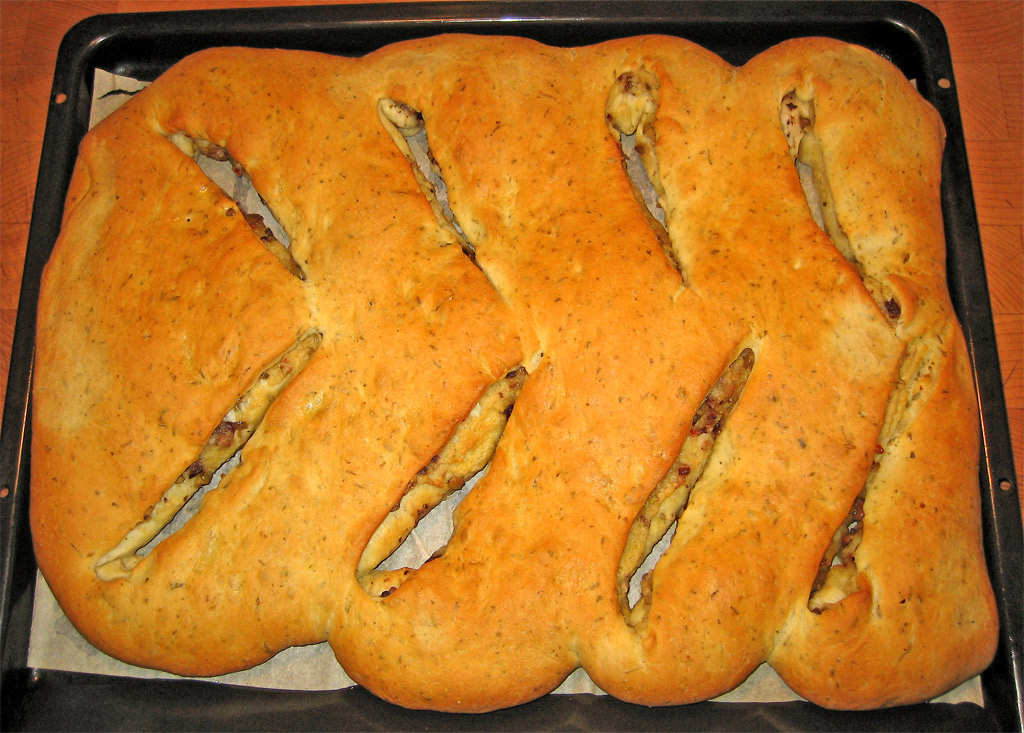
Fougasse

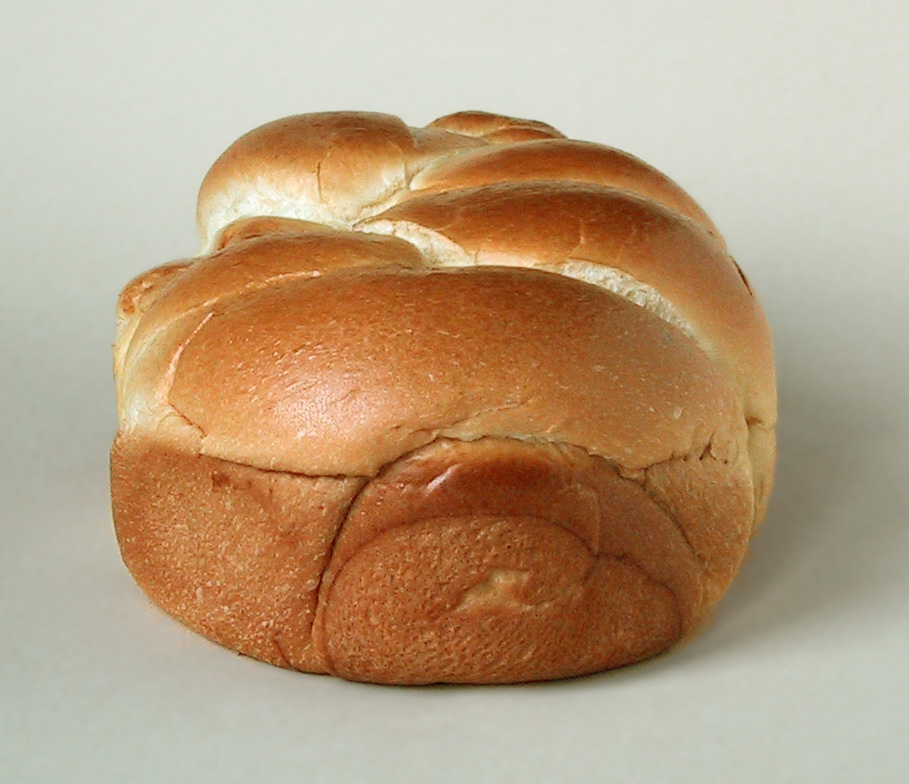
Brioche

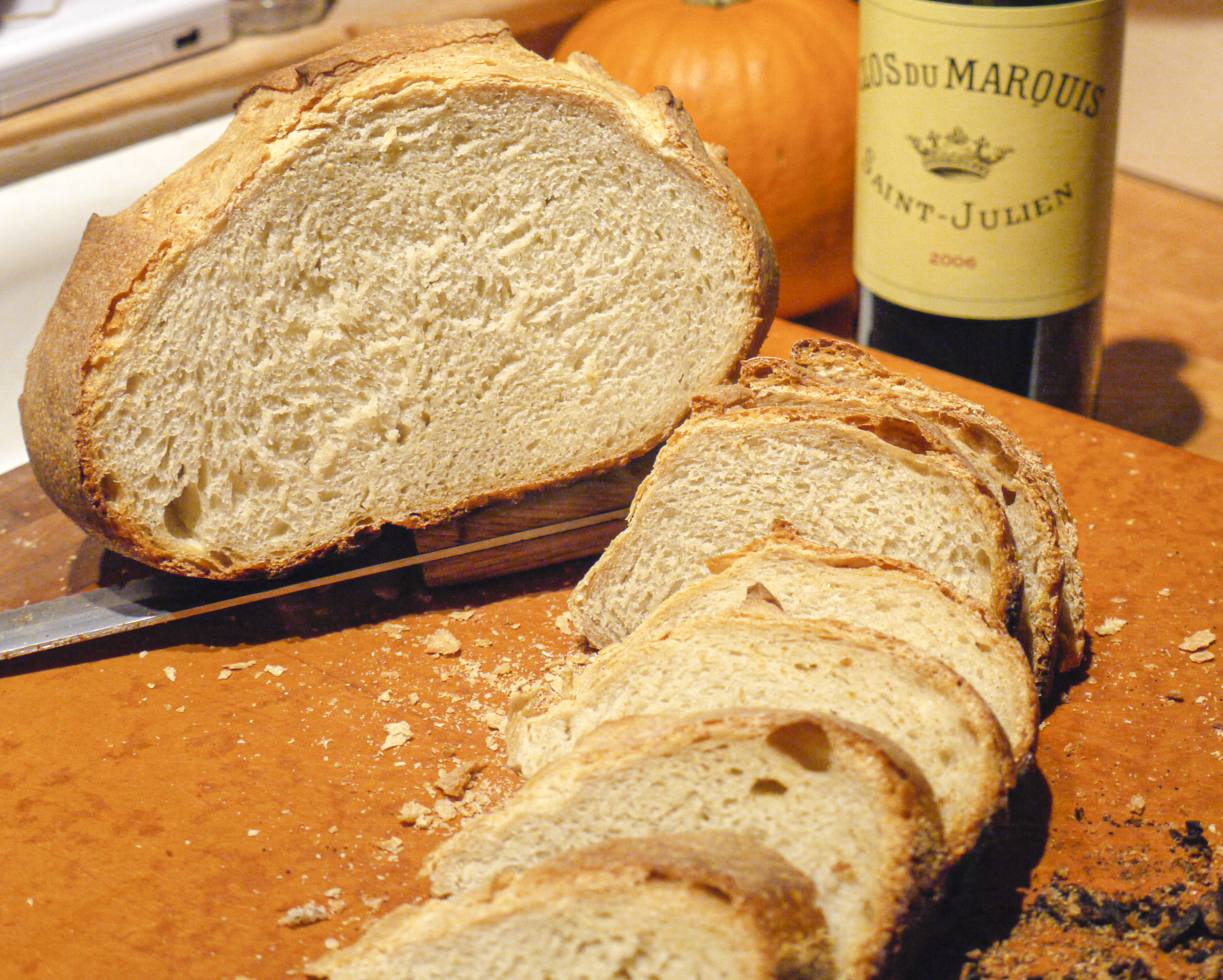
Pain de campagne

This is a list of notable French breads, consisting of breads that originated in France.

- Baguette – a long, thin type of bread of French origin. The "baguette de tradition française" is made from wheat flour, water, yeast, and common salt. It may contain up to 2% broad bean flour, up to 0.5% soya flour, and up to 0.3% wheat malt flour.
- Boule de pain – a traditional shape of French bread resembling a squashed ball. It is traditionally prepared using only bread flour, salt, a leavening agent and water.
- Brioche – has a high egg and butter content, which gives it a rich, tender and tight crumb.
- Croissant – a buttery, flaky, French viennoiserie pastry inspired by the shape of the Austrian kipferl but using the French yeast-leavened laminated dough. Croissants are named for their historical crescent shape, the dough is layered with butter, rolled and folded several times in succession, then rolled into a thin sheet, in a technique called laminating. The process results in a layered, flaky texture, similar to a puff pastry.
- Faluche – a pale white bread that is a traditional bread in the Nord-Pas-de-Calais region of northern France and the Tournai region of southern Belgium.
- Ficelle – a type of French bread loaf, made with yeast and similar to a baguette but much thinner.
- Fougasse – typically associated with Provence but found (with variations) in other regions. Some versions are sculpted or slashed into a pattern resembling an ear of wheat.
- Pain aux noix – prepared using whole grain wheat flour and walnuts
- Pain brié – a traditional Normandy bread, its name comes from the pounding of the dough, as "brie" is derived from the Old Norman verb brier, meaning "to pound". It has a tight crumb and is a "fairly dense loaf".
- Pain complet – prepared using whole wheat flour, it is moist and has a tight crumb texture. It is sometimes prepared using a mix of wheat and white flour.
- Pain couronne – named "bread crown" in French for its shaping, it consists of small sourdough rolls that are torn off from the main loaf.
- Pain d’épices – French for "spice bread", this is a rye quick bread that includes spices such as cinnamon and honey.
- Pain de campagne – French for "country bread", and also called "French sourdough", it is typically a large round loaf (miche) made from either natural leavening or baker's yeast. Most traditional versions of this bread are made with a combination of white flour with whole wheat flour and/or rye flour, water, leavening and salt.
- Pain de mie – a white or brown bread with a thin, soft crust. It is used as a sandwich bread at times.
- Pain de seigle – a rye bread with flavor notes of chocolate and malt

== See also ==
- Crackling bread – Pompe aux grattons or brioche aux griaudes, in the cuisine of central France, is a bread, tart, or brioche that incorporates cracklings. It is a specialty of the Bourbonnais.
- List of breads
- List of American breads
- List of British breads
- List of Indian breads
- List of Pakistani breads
- List of Uruguayan breads
- Bread in Spain#List of Spanish breads
