= Tharshan Selvarajah =

Tamil-French chef (born 1986)

Tharshan Selvarajah (born 1986) is a Tamil-French chef known for baking baguettes. In 2023, he was adjudged as the winner of Grand Prize of the Traditional French Baguette after taking part in a competition conducted by Paris City Hall.

== Biography ==
Selvarajah moved to France from Sri Lanka in 2006, and began his culinary career at an Italian restaurant making salads and desserts. Through one of his regular customers at the restaurant, he received the opportunity to make bread, despite his lack of experience with baguettes. He gradually learnt the craft of making baguettes and became a chief baker in 2012.

In 2018, he participated in the Grand Prix de la Baguette de Tradition Francaise de la Ville De Paris, a competition for the title of "best baguette," where Selvarajah attained third place. On May 10, 2023, he won the competition after edging out 126 other baguettes. He currently supplies baguettes to the Élysée Palace, the official home of the French president.

Selvarajah married his wife in France, and has two children. According to sources, he has yet to apply for French citizenship, despite residing in France for over 17 years.

In May 2024, he was officially selected as a torchbearer for the 2024 Summer Olympics, becoming the first person of Sri Lankan origin to be chosen as a torchbearer for an Olympic event.
