= Pan bagnat =

Specialty sandwich in the Nice area, France

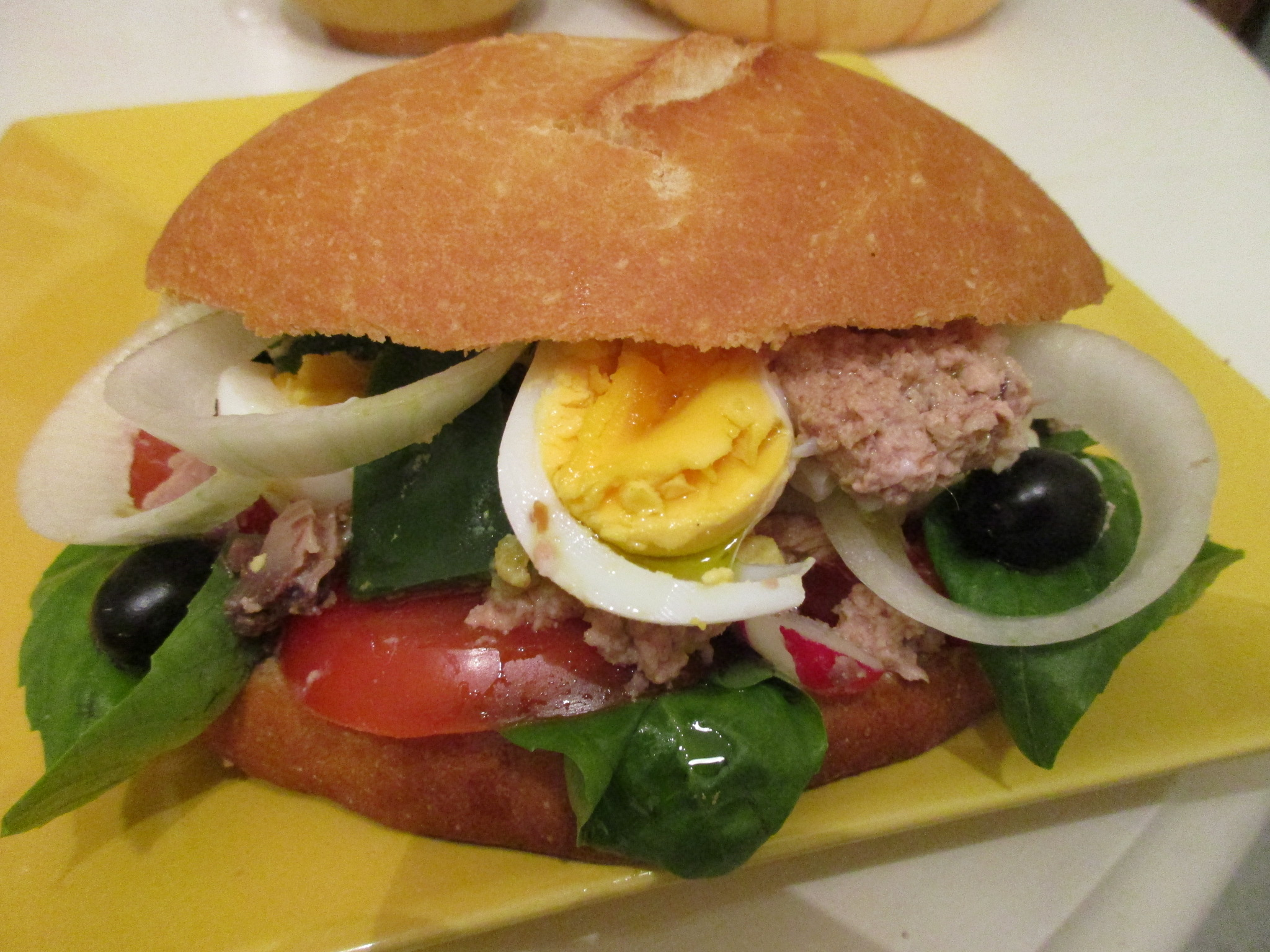
- A pan bagnat
- Type: Sandwich
- Place of origin: France
- Region or state: Nice
- Main ingredients: Pain de campagne or round white bread, radishes or/and scallion, green bell pepper, tomatoes, pepper, egg, olives, anchovies or/and tuna, basil, olive oil

The pan bagnat (pronounced [pɑ̃ baˈɲa]) (pan bagna, and alternatively in French as pain bagnat) (Note: "Pan Bagna In Nice, pan bagna (or bagnat,) is a street food that can easily be turned into this hors d'oeuvre. The name pan bagna, which means something like "bathed bread, " implies that the bread becomes soaked, ...") is a sandwich that is a specialty of Nice, France. The sandwich is composed of pain de campagne, a whole wheat bread, enclosing a salade niçoise, a salad composed mainly of raw vegetables, hard boiled eggs, anchovies and/or tuna, and olive oil, salt, and pepper. Sometimes vinegar is added, but never mayonnaise. It was historically prepared to use day-old bread.

The pan bagnat is a popular dish in the region around Nice where it is sold in most bakeries and markets. Pan bagnat and the salade niçoise (salade nissarda), along with ratatouille (La Ratatouia Nissarda in Provençal), socca and pissaladière are strongly linked to the city of Nice, where they have been developed over time out of local ingredients. It is sometimes served as an hors d'oeuvre.

== Etymology ==
The name of the sandwich comes from the local Provençal language, Nissart, in which pan banhat and the alternative spelling pan bagnat mean "bathed", or wet/soaked, bread. It is sometimes spelled "pain bagnat", mixing the French pain with the Provençal bagnat.

== Preparation ==
Pan bagnat is prepared using bread or homemade bread that is generally round (French: pain de ménage) optionally rubbed with garlic, tuna, anchovies, sliced tomato, olives, olive oil, salt and pepper. Additional ingredients to prepare the dish can include arugula, basil, artichoke, and red wine vinegar. The olive oil is typically used on the bread, which may be marinated or soaked in the oil and then strained off, hence the name "bathed bread". The garlic is sometimes used to rub the bread with.

Click on images to enlarge

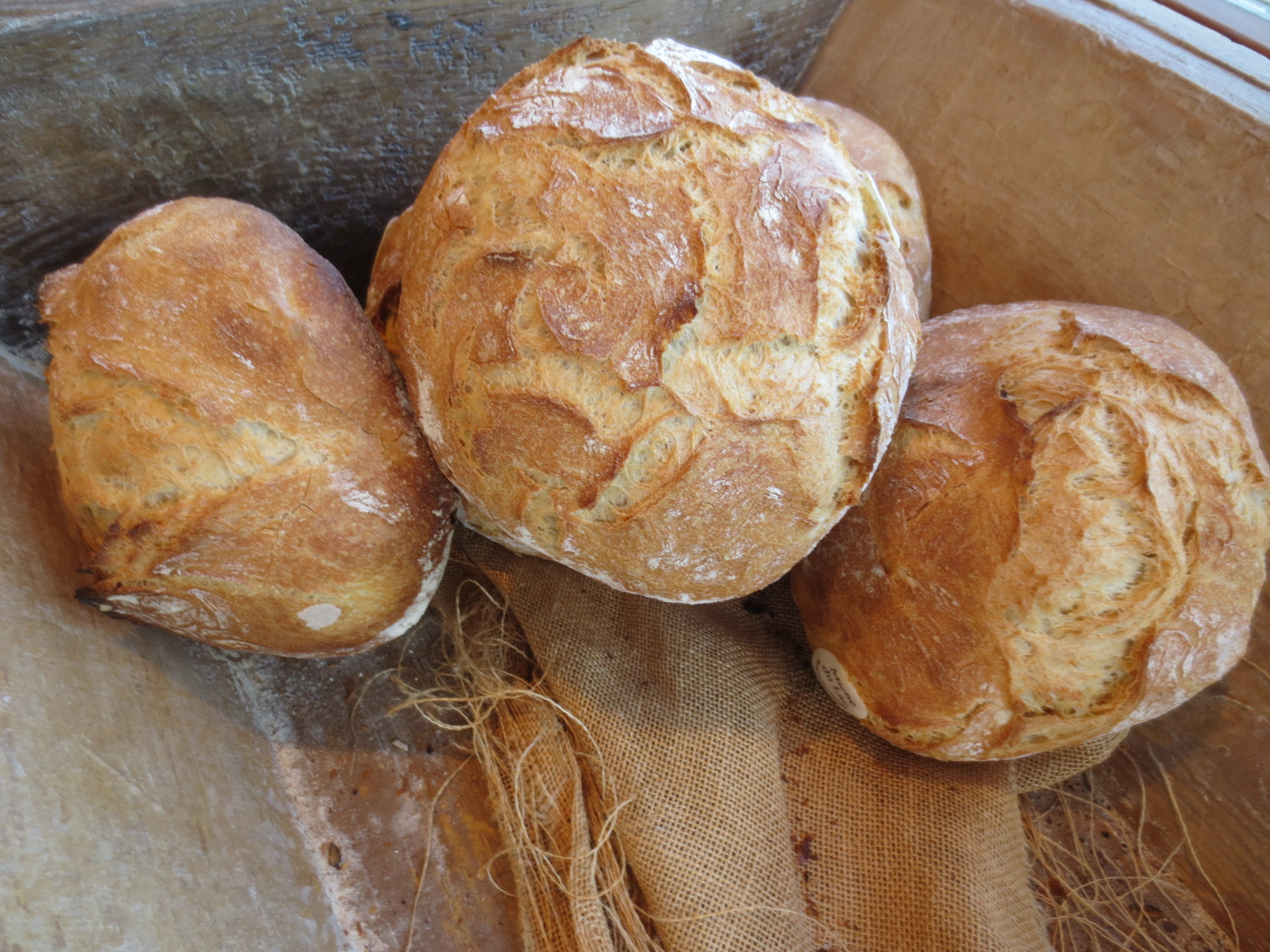
Breads of pan bagnat

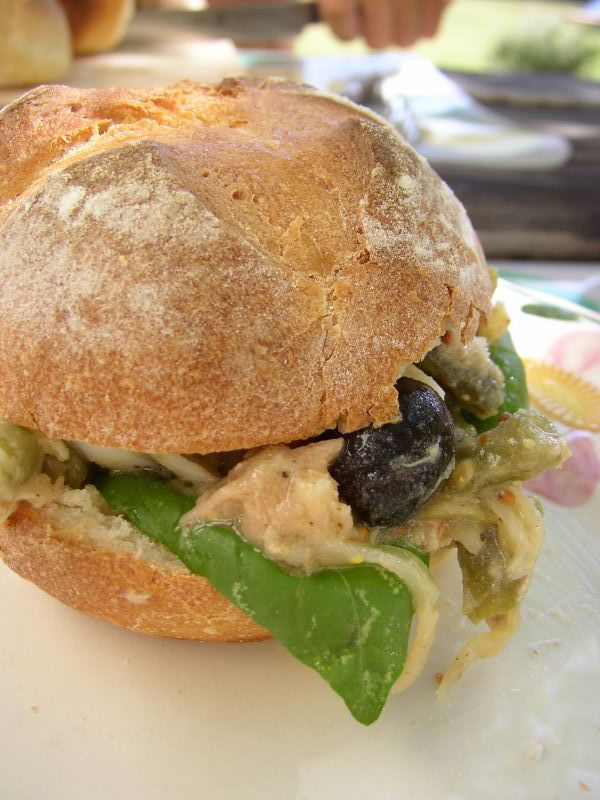
Pan bagnat

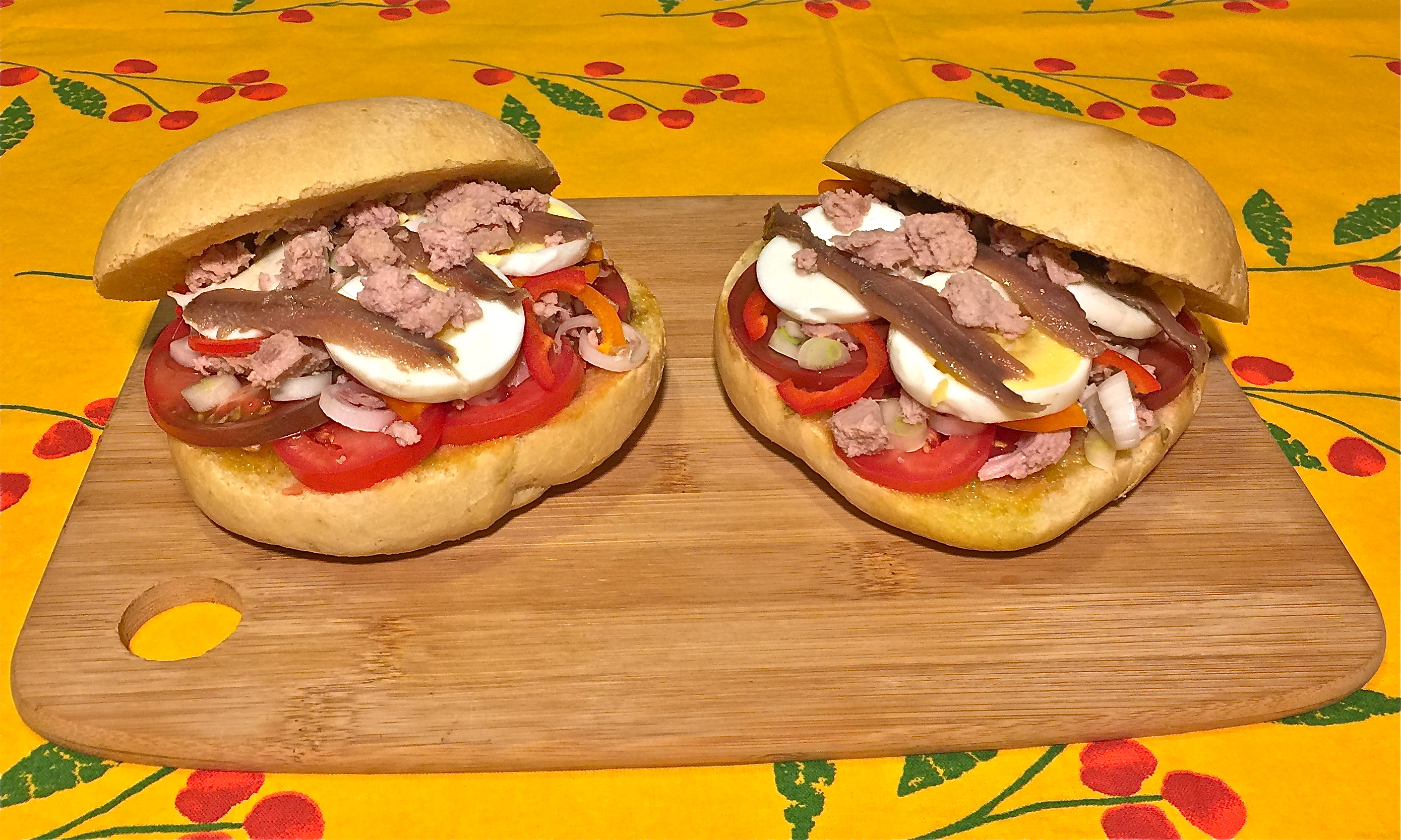
Two pan bagnat.

== Similar dishes ==
Pan bagnat is partly related to the muffuletta sandwich. and is a close relative of the Tunisian Tuna Sandwich (Casse-Croûte Tunisien).

== See also ==
- List of sandwiches
