= Miller Baking Company =

Companies based in Milwaukee

- Type: Commercial Bakery
- Founded: 1923 in Milwaukee, Wisconsin, United States
- Headquarters: Milwaukee, Wisconsin, USA
- Products: Pretzilla
- Owner: Brian Miller
- Website: pretzilla.com

Miller Baking Company is an American, privately owned company that specializes in a line of bakery products known by the brand name Pretzilla. The company is headquartered in Milwaukee, Wisconsin.

== History ==
Miller Baking Company was founded in 1923 as Miller's Bakery, a storefront kosher bakery. Richard Miller purchased the firm in 1970 from an unrelated family with the same Miller surname. During his time, the firm grew into a supplier of fresh bakery products to local Milwaukee outlets. Through 2017, these bakery products included donuts, rye, challah, Ciabatta, sourdough, and many more. He built the company's headquarters in downtown Milwaukee in 1976.

The current owner, Brian Miller, took over management of the firm from his father in 1997 and introduced the Pretzilla brand of soft pretzel products.

The Pretzilla brand was released initially in 2007 as a pretzel bun for hamburgers or sandwiches. The brand has seen significant growth and in 2017 made up about 90 percent of the firm's revenues. Sales of Pretzilla products in 2017 were up 40 percent.

== Management and Operations ==
Brian Miller is the owner and CEO of Miller Baking Company. As of 2018, the firm employed 120 people, the vast majority living in the Milwaukee area.

In July 2012, Miller Baking was running out of space at its downtown facility. It purchased a second building in Milwaukee, primarily for freezing and shipping product.

In January 2018, Miller Baking announced it sold its fresh route bakery business, so all its manufacturing would focus solely on the firm's Pretzilla brand of products.

In November 2020, Miller Baking announced it had been sold to Benestar Brands, a portfolio company of Highlander Partners, L.P. and producer of snack product brands Mac's, Cazo de Oro, Turkey Creek, PORQ, and Chicas Chips.

== Products ==
Historically, the company produced more than 175 products. Miller Baking introduced the Pretzilla soft pretzel bun in 2007 and was initially making about 35 pounds of the dough daily. It trademarked the name and the tagline – "Tastes so big, other buns may go extinct" – in 2010. As of 2018, the company now produces more than 12,000 pounds of Pretzilla dough per day.

This line of products consists of pretzel bun-style rolls including hamburger buns, mini-buns for sandwiches such as sliders, sausage buns, and Pretzilla bites, a separate line of snacks made from the company's proprietary pretzel bun recipe. Most Pretzilla products are kosher, vegan, allergen-friendly, and clean label. The Bites with Cheese Dip are not kosher. In addition, all Miller Baking production facilities are nut-free.

This line of products has been featured in several news and media outlets, including inclusion in a January 2018 episode of the popular cooking show Top Chef, as well as being showcased in The New York Times within a feature on the restaurant Tetsu.

In January 2018, Miller Baking Company made the announcement that it will discontinue all non-Pretzilla products and focus solely on the Pretzilla brand.
