= Concours de la meilleure baguette de Paris =

French baguette competition

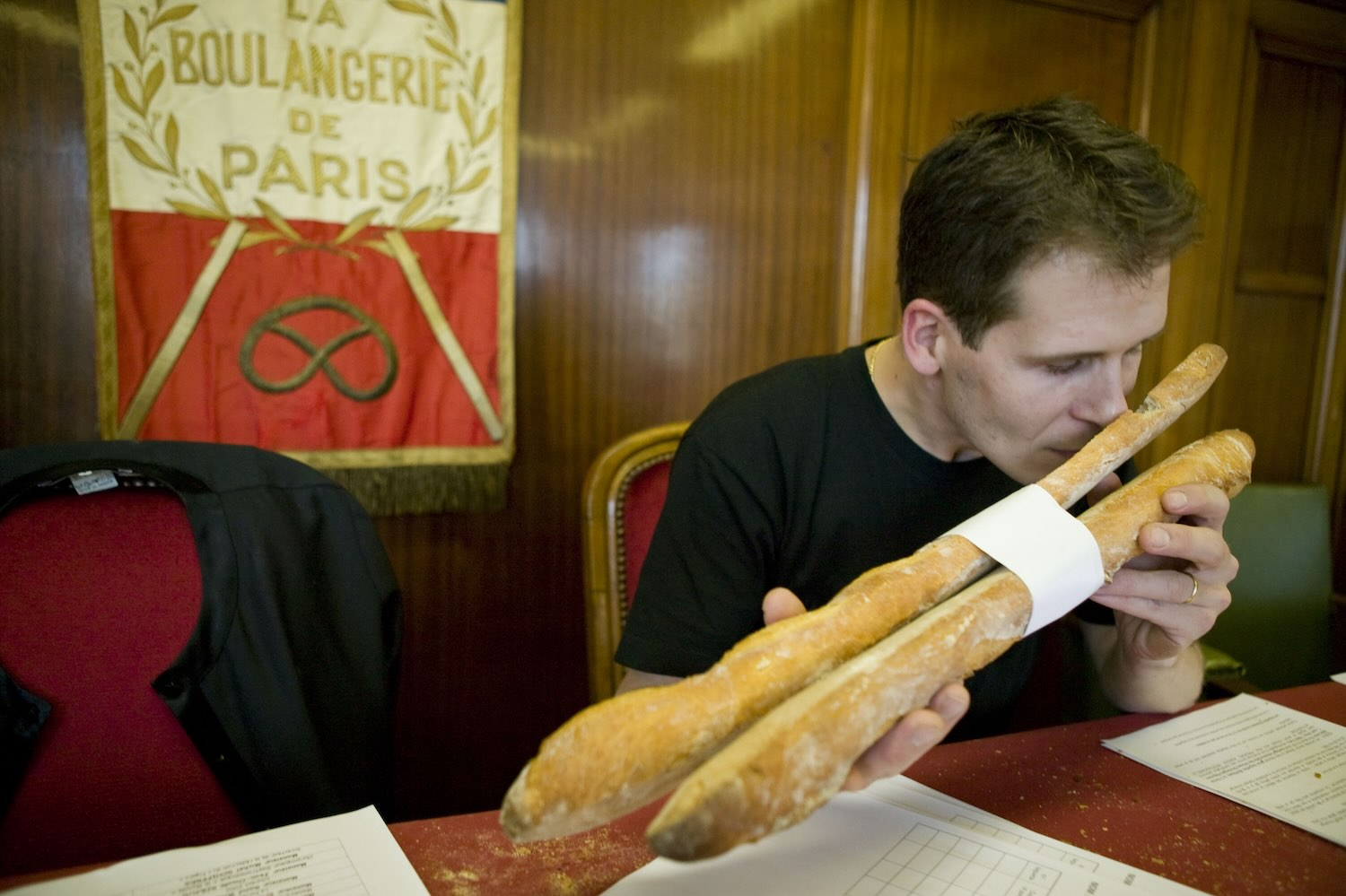
A member of the 2004 jury examines baguettes

The Concours de la meilleure baguette de Paris is an annual competition to determine the best baguette in Paris. Its official name is Grand prix de la baguette de tradition française de la ville de Paris (transl. Grand Prix of the French traditional baguette of the city of Paris). First held in 1994, the competition is organized by the city of Paris in collaboration with the Confédération nationale de la boulangerie-pâtisserie française (National Confederation of French Bakeries and Patisseries). The winner receives a medal and a prize of 4,000 euros. The bakery is given the honor of becoming a supplier to the Élysée, the official residence of the President of France, for one year.

== History ==
The competition has been organized by the Paris City Hall every year since 1994. It takes place on the premises of the Professional Chamber of Baker-Pastry Craftsmen, on the Île Saint-Louis. The jury of 15 members is made up of professionals, food journalists, and since 2020, six Parisians drawn by a lottery.

== Competition process ==
To be eligible for the prize, baguettes must measure between 55–65 cm (22–26 in), weigh between 250–300 g (8.8–10.6 oz) and have a salt content of a level of 18 grams per kilogram (0.29 oz/lb) of flour. Many of the baguettes fail to meet this standard and are immediately disqualified. Those that qualify are spread across three tables at which members of the jury are seated. The baguettes are numbered to guarantee anonymity. The selection criteria are doneness, crumb, taste, smell, and appearance. These qualities are scored between 0 and 4. The ten best are determined from each table for a total of 30. In the second round, the members of each table judge the 10 selected by the other two groups of jurors. From this final tasting, a winner is selected.

== Prize ==
In addition to a medal and a prize of €4,000, the winner becomes a supplier to the Élysée for one year. Winners also benefit from recognition allowing them to increase turnover, with some seeing between a 15 to 25 percent increase in sales volume and some bakeries gaining international renown.

== List of winners ==
- 1994: René Saint-Ouen
- 1995: Jean-Noël Julien
- 1996: Philippe Gosselin
- 1997: René Saint-Ouen
- 1998: Antonio Teixeira
- 1999: Stéphane Pouget
- 2000: Raoul Maeder
- 2001: Pierre Demoncy
- 2002: Raoul Maeder
- 2003: Laurent Connan
- 2004: Pierre Thilloux
- 2005: Eric Sanna
- 2006: Jean-Pierre Cohier
- 2007: Arnaud Delmontel
- 2008: Anis Bouabsa
- 2009: Franck Tobarel
- 2010: Djibril Bodian
- 2011: Pascal Barillon
- 2012: Sébastien Mauvieux
- 2013: Ridha Khadher
- 2014: Antonio Teixeira
- 2015: Djibril Bodian
- 2016: Mickaël Reydellet and Florian Charles
- 2017: Sami Bouattour
- 2018: Mahmoud M’seddi
- 2019: Fabrice Leroy
- 2020: Taieb Sahal
- 2021: Makram Akrout
- 2022: Damien Dedun
- 2023: Tharshan Selvarajah
- 2024: Xavier Netry
- 2025: Mickaël Reydellet
- 2026: Sithamparappillai Jegatheepan
