= Baker percentage =

Mathematical notation in cooking

Baker's percentage is a notation method indicating the proportion of an ingredient relative to the flour used in a recipe when making breads, cakes, muffins, and other baked goods. It is also referred to as baker's math, and may be indicated by a phrase such as based on flour weight. It is sometimes called formula percentage, a phrase that refers to the sum of a set of baker's percentages. (Note: There is some ambiguity regarding the use of the phrase "formula percentage" in the literature. From the published date of 2004 to the date 2007, Hui's definitions have changed slightly. In 2004 "formula percent" was defined by "total weight of all ingredients"; however by the latter date's usage, the preference was to use the prefix "true" in the phrase "True formula percent (true percent)" when referring to "total weight of all ingredients." In 2005, Ramaswamy & Marcotte used the phrase "typical formula" in reference to a "baker's %" series of ingredients, then drew the semantic and mathematic distinctions that "actual percentage" was one based upon "total mass", which they labeled "% flour", "% water", etc. In 2010, Figoni said that "baker's percentage" was "sometimes called formula percentage...." In 1939, the phrase formula percentage was said to commonly refer to the sum of the particular percentages that would later be called bakers' percentages.) Baker's percentage expresses a ratio in percentages of each ingredient's weight to the total flour weight:

$$\text{Baker's percentage}_\text{ingredient} = 100\% \times \frac{\text{Weight}_\text{ingredient}}{\text{Weight}_\text{flour}}$$

For example, in a recipe that calls for 10 pounds of flour and 5 pounds of water, the corresponding baker's percentages are 100% for the flour and 50% for the water. Because these percentages are stated with respect to the weight of flour rather than with respect to the weight of all ingredients, the sum of these percentages always exceeds 100%.

Flour-based recipes are more precisely conceived as baker's percentages, and more accurately measured using weight instead of volume. The uncertainty in using volume measurements follows from the fact that flour settles in storage and therefore does not have a constant density.

Colloquially, baker's percentages can also be used as a term to express other ingredients in relation to "100%" of an anchor ingredient. For example in relation to 100% in cream in a custard, or to any dominant ingredient. The concept is similar to culinary ratios.

== Baker's percentages ==
A yeast-dough formula could call for the following list of ingredients, presented as a series of baker's percentages:

flour	100%
water	60%
yeast	1%
salt	2%
oil	1%

=== Conversions ===
There are several common conversions that are used with baker's percentages. Converting baker's percentages to ingredient weights is one. Converting known ingredient weights to baker percentages is another. Conversion to true percentages, or based on total weight, is helpful to calculate unknown ingredient weights from a desired total or formula weight.

==== Using baker's percentages ====
To derive the ingredient weights when any weight of flour W_{f} is chosen: (Note: Derived algebraically from Gisslen's formula.)

$$\begin{align}
\text{Weight}_\text{ingredient} &= \frac{\text{Weight}_\text{flour} \times \text{Baker's percentage}_\text{ingredient}}{100\%} \\
&= \text{Weight}_\text{flour} \times \text{Baker's percentage}_\text{ingredient}
\end{align}$$

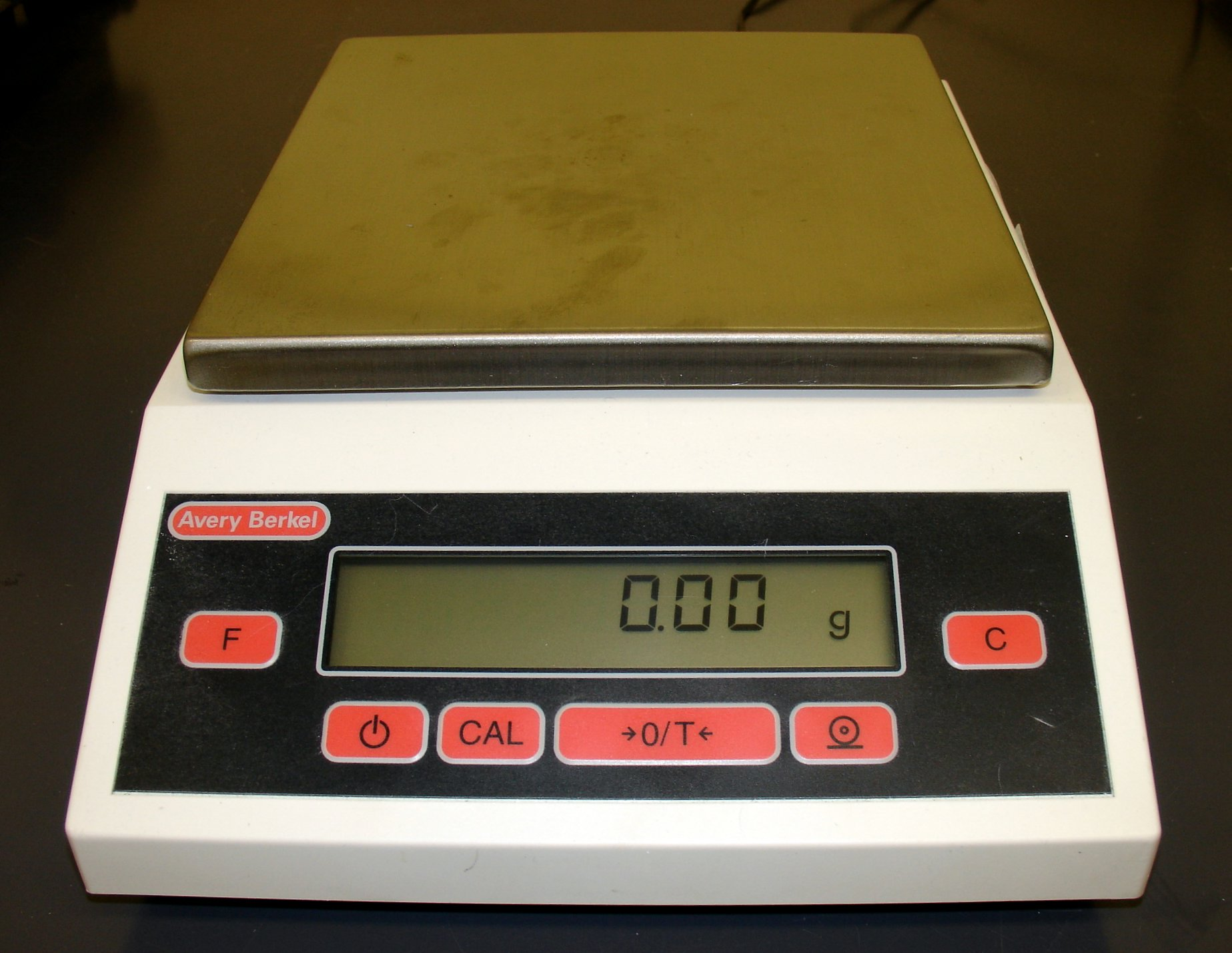
Digital scale for weighing ingredients.

Baker's percentage		weights (Note: W_{f} denotes a flour weight. In method 1 the percentage was divided by 100%. Method 2 works well when using a calculator. When using a spreadsheet, formatting the cell as percentage versus number automatically handles the per-cent portion of the calculation.)	
ingredient	%	method 1	method 2
flour	100%	W_{f} * 1.00	W_{f} * 100%
water	35%	W_{f} * 0.35	W_{f} * 35%
milk	35%	W_{f} * 0.35	W_{f} * 35%
fresh yeast	4%	W_{f} * 0.04	W_{f} * 4%
salt	1.8%	W_{f} * 0.018	W_{f} * 1.8%

In the example below, 2 lb and 10 kg of flour weights have been calculated. Depending on the desired weight unit, only one of the following four weight columns is used:

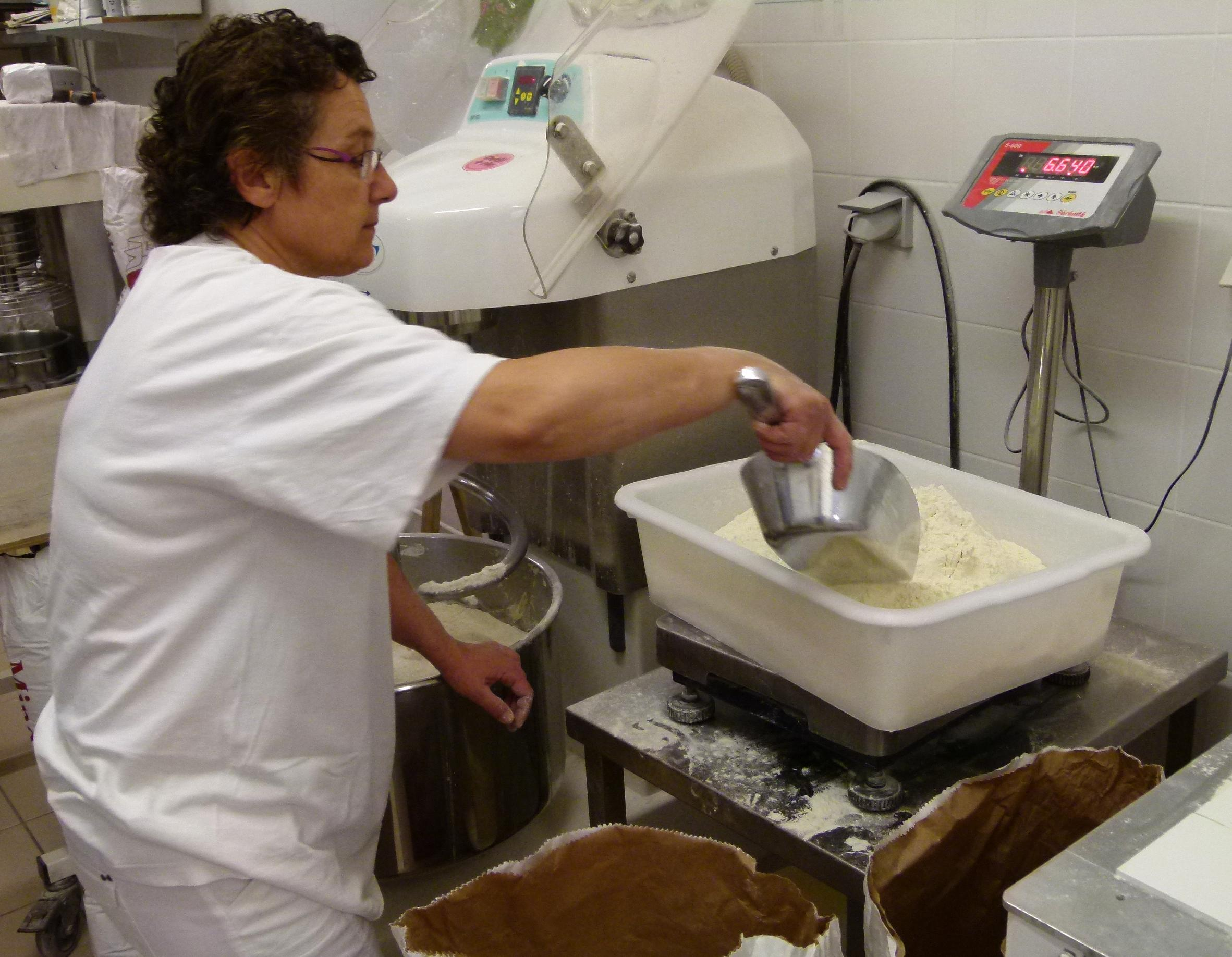
Weighing ingredients.

Baker's percentage		weights			
Baker's percentage		2 lb		10 kg	
ingredient	%	lb	oz	kg	g
flour	100%	2	32	10	10000
water	35%	0.7	11.2	3.5	3500
milk	35%	0.7	11.2	3.5	3500
fresh yeast	4%	0.08	1.28	0.4	400
salt	1.8%	0.036	0.576	0.18	180

==== Creating baker's percentages ====
The baker has determined how much a recipe's ingredients weigh, and uses uniform decimal weight units. All ingredient weights are divided by the flour weight to obtain a ratio, then the ratio is multiplied by 100% to yield the baker's percentage for that ingredient:

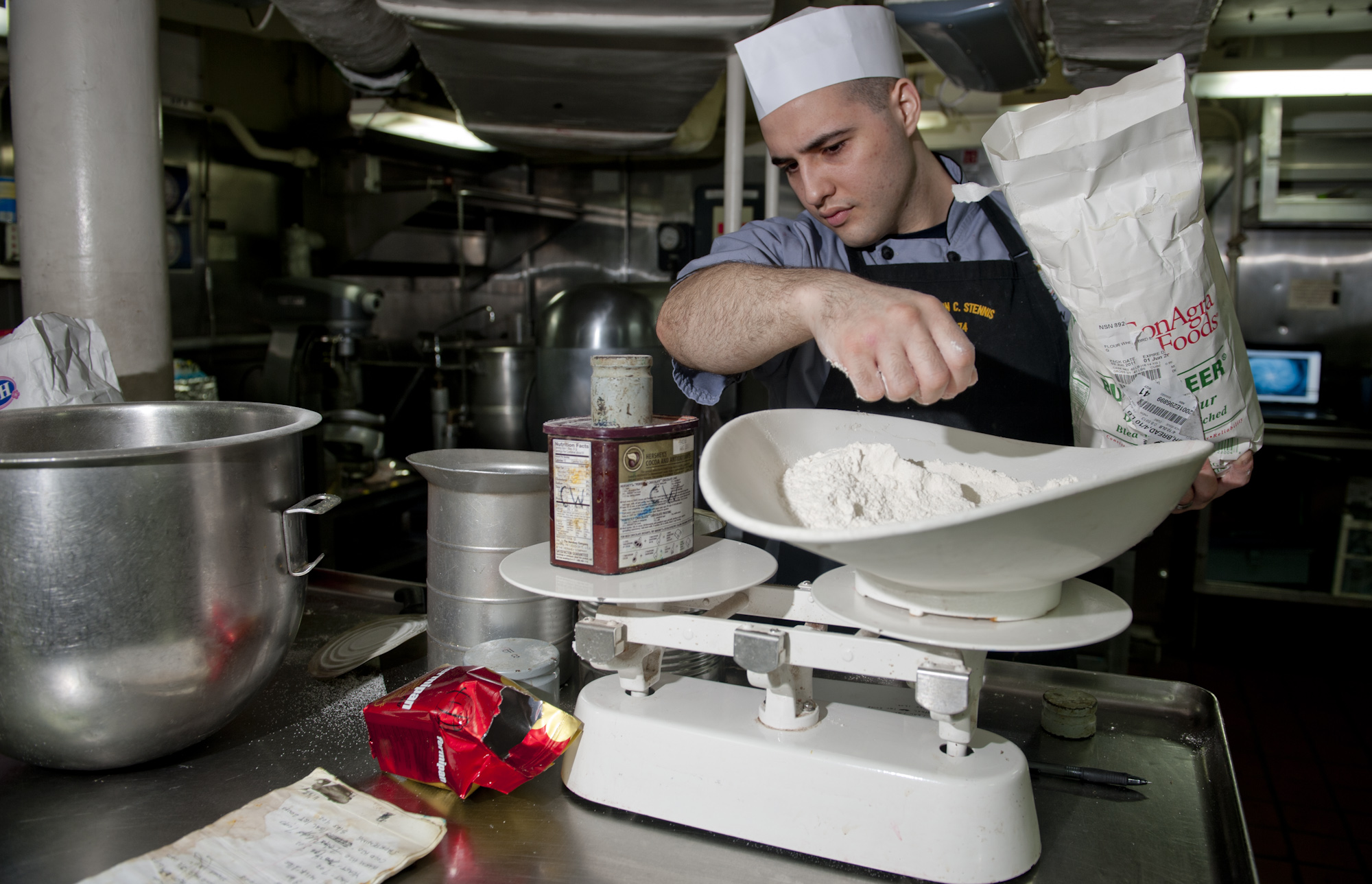
Using a balance to measure a mass of flour.

ingredient	weight	(ingredient mass)/(flour mass)	× 100%	
flour	10 kg	10 ~~kg~~ ÷ 10 ~~kg~~ = 1.000	=	100%
water	3.5 kg	3.5 ~~kg~~ ÷ 10 ~~kg~~ = 0.350	=	35%
milk	3.5 kg	3.5 ~~kg~~ ÷ 10 ~~kg~~ = 0.350	=	35%
fresh yeast	0.4 kg	0.4 ~~kg~~ ÷ 10 ~~kg~~ = 0.040	=	4%
salt	0.18 kg	0.18 ~~kg~~ ÷ 10 ~~kg~~ = 0.018	=	1.8%

Due to the canceling of uniform weight units, the baker may employ any desired system of measurement (metric or avoirdupois, etc.) when using a baker's percentage to determine an ingredient's weight. Generally, the baker finds it easiest to use the system of measurement that is present on the available tools.

==== Formula percentage and total mass ====
Ingredient (Note: True percentage values have been rounded and are approximate.)	baker's %	true %
flour	100%	56.88%
water	35%	19.91%
milk	35%	19.91%
fresh yeast	4%	2.28%
salt	1.8%	1.02%
Total	175.8%	100%

The total or sum of the baker's percentages is called the formula percentage. The sum of the ingredient masses is called the formula mass (or formula "weight"). Here are some interesting calculations:

- The flour's mass times the formula percentage equals the formula mass:

$$\begin{align}
\text{Formula mass} &= \text{Mass}_\text{flour} \times \text{Formula percentage} \\
\frac{\text{Formula mass}}{\text{Formula percentage}} &= \text{Mass}_\text{flour}
\end{align}$$

- An ingredient's mass is obtained by multiplying the formula mass by that ingredient's true percentage; because an ingredient's true percentage is that ingredient's baker's percentage divided by the formula percentage expressed as parts per hundred, an ingredient's mass can also be obtained by multiplying the formula mass by the ingredient's baker's percentage and then dividing the result by the formula percentage:

$$\begin{align}
\text{Mass}_\text{ingredient} &= \text{Formula mass} \times \text{True percentage}_\text{ingredient} \\
\text{True percentage}_\text{ingredient} &= \frac{\text{Baker's percentage}_\text{ingredient}}{\text{Formula percentage}} \times 100\% \\
\text{Mass}_\text{ingredient} &= \text{Formula mass} \times \frac{\text{Baker's percentage}_\text{ingredient}}{\text{Formula percentage}} \\
&= \frac{\text{Formula mass} \times \text{Baker's percentage}_\text{ingredient}}{\text{Formula percentage}}
\end{align}$$

Thus, it is not necessary to calculate each ingredient's true percentage in order to calculate each ingredient's mass, provided the formula mass and the baker's percentages are known.

- Ingredients' masses can also be obtained by first calculating the mass of the flour then using baker's percentages to calculate remaining ingredient masses:

$$\begin{align}
\text{Mass}_\text{ingredient} &= \frac{\text{Formula mass}}{\text{Formula percentage}} \times \text{Baker's percentage}_\text{ingredient} \\
&= \text{Mass}_\text{flour} \times \text{Baker's percentage}_\text{ingredient}
\end{align}$$

- The two methods of calculating the mass of an ingredient are equivalent:

$$\text{Formula mass} \times \text{True percentage}_\text{ingredient} = \text{Mass}_\text{flour} \times \text{Baker's percentage}_\text{ingredient}$$

=== Weights and densities ===
The use of customary U.S. units can sometimes be awkward and the metric system makes these conversions simpler. In the metric system, there are only a small number of basic measures of relevance to cooking: the gram (g) for weight, the liter (L) for volume, the meter (m) for length, and degrees Celsius (°C) for temperature; multiples and sub-multiples are indicated by prefixes, two commonly used metric cooking prefixes are milli- (m-) and kilo- (k-). Intra-metric conversions involve moving the decimal point.

Common avoirdupois and metric weight equivalences:

1 pound (lb) = 16 ounces (oz)
1 kilogram (kg) = 1,000 grams (g) = 2.20462262 lb
1 lb = 453.59237 g = 0.45359237 kg
1 oz = 28.3495231 g.

In four different English-language countries of recipe and measuring-utensil markets, approximate cup volumes range from 236.59 to 284.1 milliliters (mL). Adaptation of volumetric recipes can be made with density approximations:

Volume to mass conversions for some common cooking ingredients
ingredient	density g/mL (Note: One gram per millilitre is very close to one avoirdupois ounce per fluid ounce: 1 g/mL ≈ 1.002 av oz/imp fl oz This is not a numerical coincidence, but comes from the original definition of the kilogram as the mass of one litre of water, and the imperial gallon as the volume occupied by ten avoirdupois pounds of water. The slight difference is due to water at 4 °C (39 °F) being used for the kilogram, and at 62 °F (17 °C) for the imperial gallon. The U.S. fluid ounce is slightly larger. 1 g/mL ≈ 1.043 av oz/U.S. fl oz)	metric cup 250 mL		imperial cup ≈284 mL		U.S. customary cup ≈237 mL (Note: From cup (unit). Note the similarity of cup mL to water weight or mass as g. This density relationship can also be useful for determining unknown volumes.)	
ingredient	density g/mL	g	oz	g	oz	g	oz
water (Note: 1 g/mL is a good rough guide for water-based liquids such as milk (the density of milk is about 1.03–1.04 g/mL).)	1 (Note: The density of water ranges from about 0.96 to 1.00 g/mL dependent on temperature and pressure. The table above assumes a temperature range 0–30 °C (32–86 °F). The variation is too small to make any difference in cooking.: Water density calculator; The Physics Factbook)	249–250	8.8	283–284	10	236–237	8.3 (Note: Since an imperial cup of water weighs approximately 10 avoirdupois ounces and five imperial cups are approximately equal to six U.S. cups, one U.S. cup of water weighs approximately 8 1/3 avoirdupois ounces.)
granulated sugar	0.8	200	7.0	230	8.0	190	6.7
wheat flour	0.5–0.6	120–150	4.4–5.3	140–170	5.0–6.0	120–140	4.2–5.0
table salt	1.2	300	10.6	340	12.0	280	10.0

Due to volume and density ambiguities, a different approach involves volumetrically measuring the ingredients, then using scales or balances of appropriate accuracy and error ranges to weigh them, and recording the results. With this method, occasionally an error or outlier of some kind occurs.

== Drawbacks ==
Baker's percentages do not accurately reflect the impact of the amount of gluten-forming proteins in the flour on the final product and therefore may need to be adjusted from country to country, or even miller to miller, depending on definitions of terms like "bread flour" and actual protein content. Manipulation of known flour-protein levels can be calculated with a Pearson square.

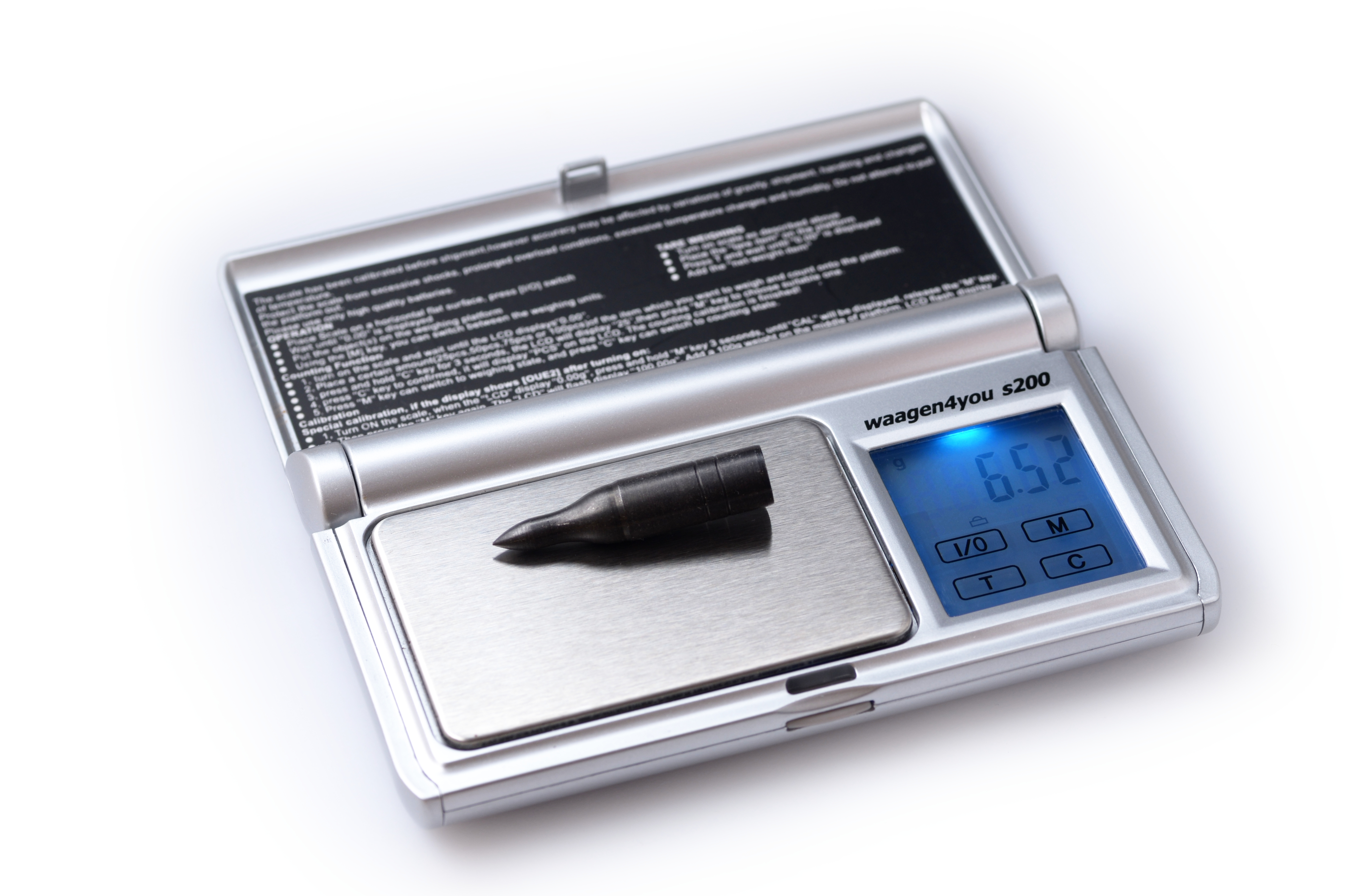
Digital scale with readability of 0.01 g.

In home baking, the amounts of ingredients such as salt or yeast expressed by mass may be too small to measure accurately on the scales used by most home cooks. For these ingredients, it may be easier to express quantities by volume, based on standard densities. For this reason, many breadmaking books that are targeted to home bakers provide both percentages and volumes for common batch sizes.

Besides the need for appropriate readability scales, a kitchen calculator is helpful when working directly from baker's percentages.

== Advantages ==
Baker's percentages enable the user to:

- compare recipes more easily (i.e., which are drier, saltier, sweeter, etc.).
- spot a bad recipe, or predict its baked characteristics.
- alter or add a single-ingredient percentage without changing the other ingredients' percentages.
- measure uniformly an ingredient where the quantity per unit may vary (as with eggs).
- scale accurately and easily for different batch sizes.

== Common formulations ==
Common formulations for bread include 100% flour, 60% water/liquid, 1% yeast, 2% salt and 1% oil, lard or butter.

== Dough hydration ==
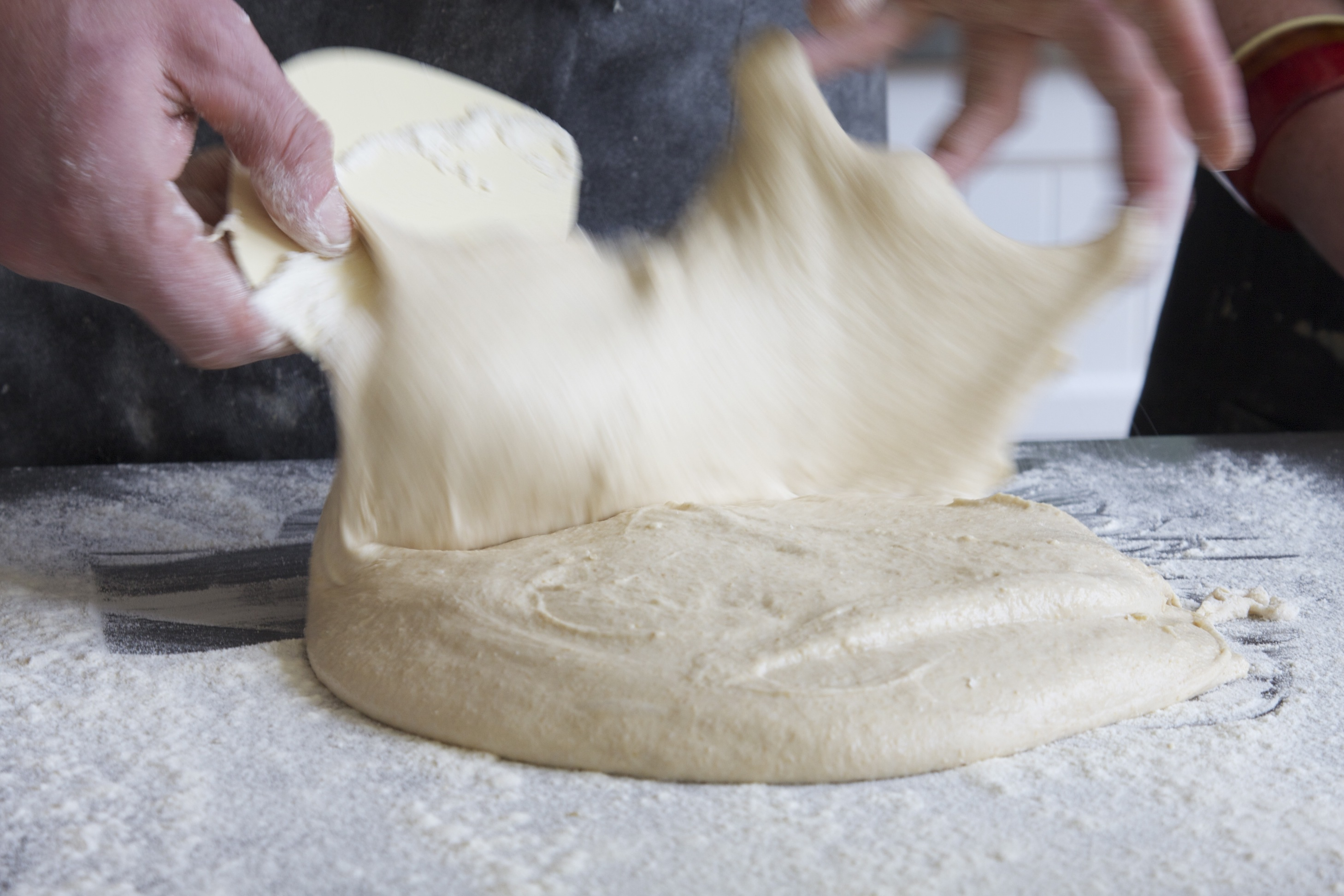
A dough with very high hydration

In a recipe, the baker's percentage for water is referred to as the "hydration"; it is indicative of the stickiness of the dough and the "crumb" of the bread. Lower hydration rates (e.g., 50–57%) are typical for bagels and pretzels, and medium hydration levels (58–65%) are typical for breads and rolls. Higher hydration levels are used to produce more and larger holes, as is common in artisan breads such as baguettes or ciabatta. Doughs are also often classified by the terms stiff, firm, soft, and slack. Batters are more liquid doughs. Muffins are a type of drop batter while pancakes are a type of pour batter.

Doughs
Very stiff	< 57%
Stiff to firm	57-65%
Soft	65-70%
Soft to slack	70-80%
Batters (Note: Mathematically converted from liquid-to-dry volumetric ratios on quick bread. 1 cup water weighs 237 g, 1 cup all purpose flour, 125 g, rounding applied. It is worth noting that if the liquid is whole milk of 3.25% milkfat, which is somewhat common in pancake recipes, the actual water content or hydration is about 88% of that value per the USDA National Nutrient database, thus pancake hydrations may be as low as, or lower than, 167% or thereabouts (190% * 88%).)
Drop	95%
Pour	190%
