= Ficelle =

Type of French bread

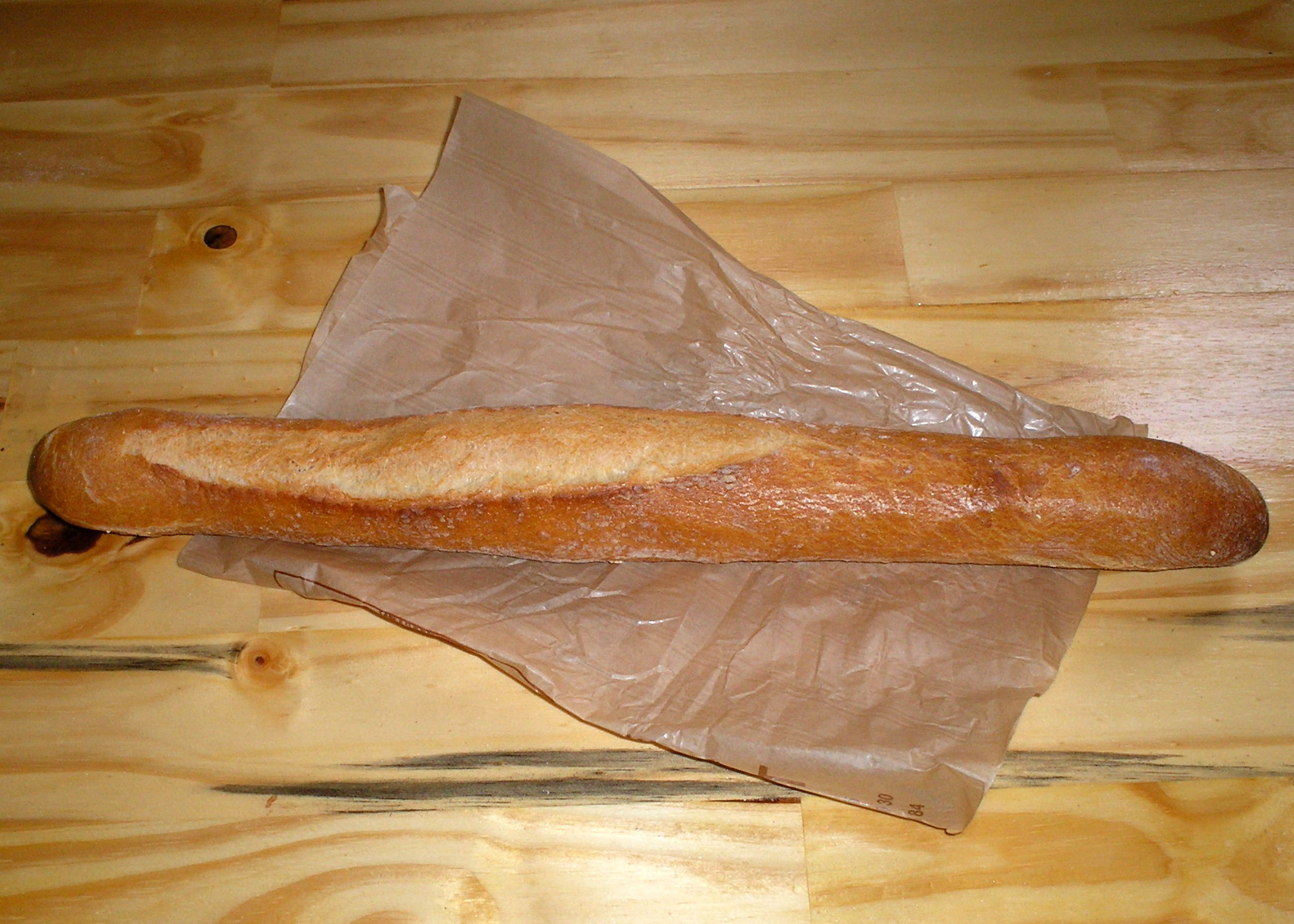
- Ficelle
- Course: bread
- Place of origin: France
- Main ingredients: flour

A ficelle (French pronunciation: [fisɛl]) is a type of French bread loaf, made with yeast and similar to a baguette but much thinner. The word ficelle means "string" in French.
