= Boule (bread) =

Traditional round bread shape

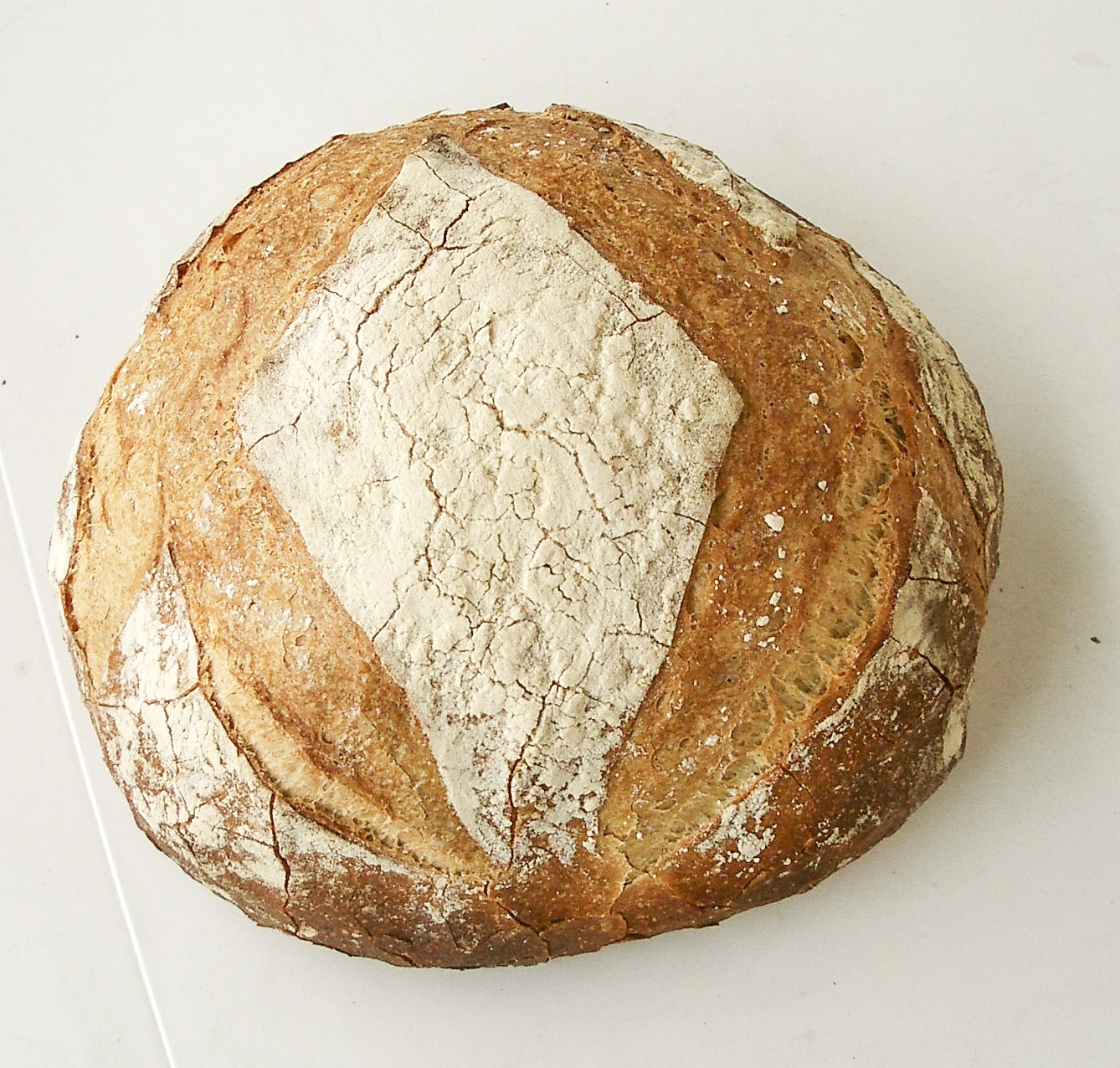
- Type: Bread shape
- Place of origin: France

Boule, from French, meaning "ball", is a traditional shape of French bread resembling half a ball. A boule can be made using any type of flour and can be leavened with commercial yeast, chemical leavening, or even wild yeast (such as sourdough). The name of this rustic loaf shape gives the French term for bakers "boulangers" and bread bakeries "boulangeries".

== Representation in art ==
Boule bread appears in certain Renaissance paintings by the Dutch painter Dieric Bouts. A representation of Boule bread can be appreciated in the still life works of the 18th-century Spanish painter Luis Eugenio Meléndez (1716–1780), and in the works of the contemporary French painter Jean-Baptiste Chardin (1699–1779).

== See also ==
- Bread roll
