= Confédération nationale de la boulangerie-pâtisserie française =

The Confédération nationale de la boulangerie-pâtisserie française (CNBPF) is the professional organization responsible for representing and defending the interests of artisan bakers and pastry chefs in France. The CNBPF brings together 94 departmental professional groups and 13 regional professional groups spread across the whole of France. The first National Bakery Congress was held in 1884 to unify the previously unconnected local groups.

== History ==
Before 1884, the bakery sector was neither unified nor represented by any structures. The various local groups spread across the country lacked any connections. However, professionals in the sector were subject to regulations, particularly regarding bread taxation, and felt the need to express themselves. To meet this need for unification, the first National Bakery Congress took place from June 24 to 28, 1884. Further meetings followed at the Hôtel des Chambres Syndicales on Rue de Lancry in Paris.

Several changes took place in the late 1890s. In 1889, the second National Bakery Congress took place, during which the General Syndicate of French Bakeries was created. It was led by President Cornet. During the third National Bakery Congress in 1894, the newspaper Le Boulanger français was created, enabling the circulation of information about the sector. In 1901, Le Boulanger français became L'Ami de la boulangerie, The French Baker's Friend.

Between 1903 and 1928, four presidents succeeded one another. In 1903, President Lefort was elected at the Fifth National Bakery Congress. President Mience replaced Mr. Lefort in 1905. In 1914, President Héroin replaced President Mience. In 1928, President André Périer replaced President Héroin.

On June 14, 1934, the General Syndicate of French Bakers changed its name to the National Confederation of Bakers. After various locations, the Confederation moved to 27 Avenue d'Eylau in the 16th arrondissement of Paris on August 10, 1937.

Several changes took place between 1940 and 1960. In 1946, the organization changed its name again, becoming the National Confederation of French Bakery and Bakery-Pastry because the profession also included pastry. Philippe Lasserre became its president and organized the CNBPF's various administrative structures to consolidate its representation. In 1955, Paul Gringoire became the new president and championed the craft industry during his term. In 1959-1960, he achieved the liberalization of bread prices, except for 300g, 700g, and 1 kg loaves.

In 1971, Francis Combe became president of the CNBPF and, at the same time, president of the Permanent Assembly of Chambers of Trades and a member of the Economic and Social Council. He secured the first collective bargaining agreement for the food industry in 1976. That same year, L'Ami de la boulangerie was renamed Les Nouvelles de la boulangerie. Francis Combe died in 1982, and Deputy President Gustave Beranger took over the leadership of the Confederation pending future elections.

In 1982, Jean Paquet was elected president. He organized the General Assembly of Bakery in 1983, during which topics related to the profession and bread were debated. The recognition of the health benefits of bread among the medical profession is partly due to his inclusion of artisanal baking at the 1990 Bichat Discussions. This initiative was the starting point for a revaluation of bread among the medical profession. In 1992, in collaboration with millers and grain producers, he created the "Espace, Pain, Information" (EPI) documentation center, which aimed to provide information on the wheat, flour, and bread industry. He successfully introduced the terms "Pain de Tradition Française" and "Pain Maison" (Homemade Bread) in a decree dated September 13, 1993, paving the way for the authentication of these breads.

In 1995, Jean Cabut became the new President of the Confederation. He obtained the law of May 25, 1998, defining the conditions for practicing the bakery profession and recognizing the terms "Baker" and "Bakery." On December 19, 1997, the Guide to Good Hygiene Practices in Pastry, produced by the Confederation, was officially validated.

From 1998 to 2017, President Jean-Pierre Crouzet served five terms, leading the National Congresses in 1999, 2000, 2001, and 2003. He was elected President of the General Confederation of Food Retailers in 2010. President Crouzet was able to advance the profession in the areas of training, regulation, social affairs, economics, and communication.

Since 2017, the CNBPF has been chaired by Dominique Anract, a professional artisan baker. In January 2020, the Confederation launched the Boulanger de France brand, which aims to recognize the expertise of bakers and pastry chefs who adhere to it by fulfilling the commitments of a quality charter. On September 23, 2018, the CNBPF reiterated the request for the registration of "know-how and culture of the baguette" as cultural and intangible heritage at the United Nations Educational, Scientific and Cultural Organization. Among three French applications, the Minister of Culture, Roselyne Bachelot decided, on 26 March 2021, to present the candidature of the baguette to the immature cultural heritage of UNESCO. On 30 November 2022, the intergovernemental committee for the preservation of immature cultural heritage of UNESCO, meeting in Rabat, Morocco, for its 17th session, decided to inscribe « the artisanal know-how and the culture of the baguette of pain » on the Representative List of immature cultural heritage of humanity.
