= Ciabatta =

Italian white bread

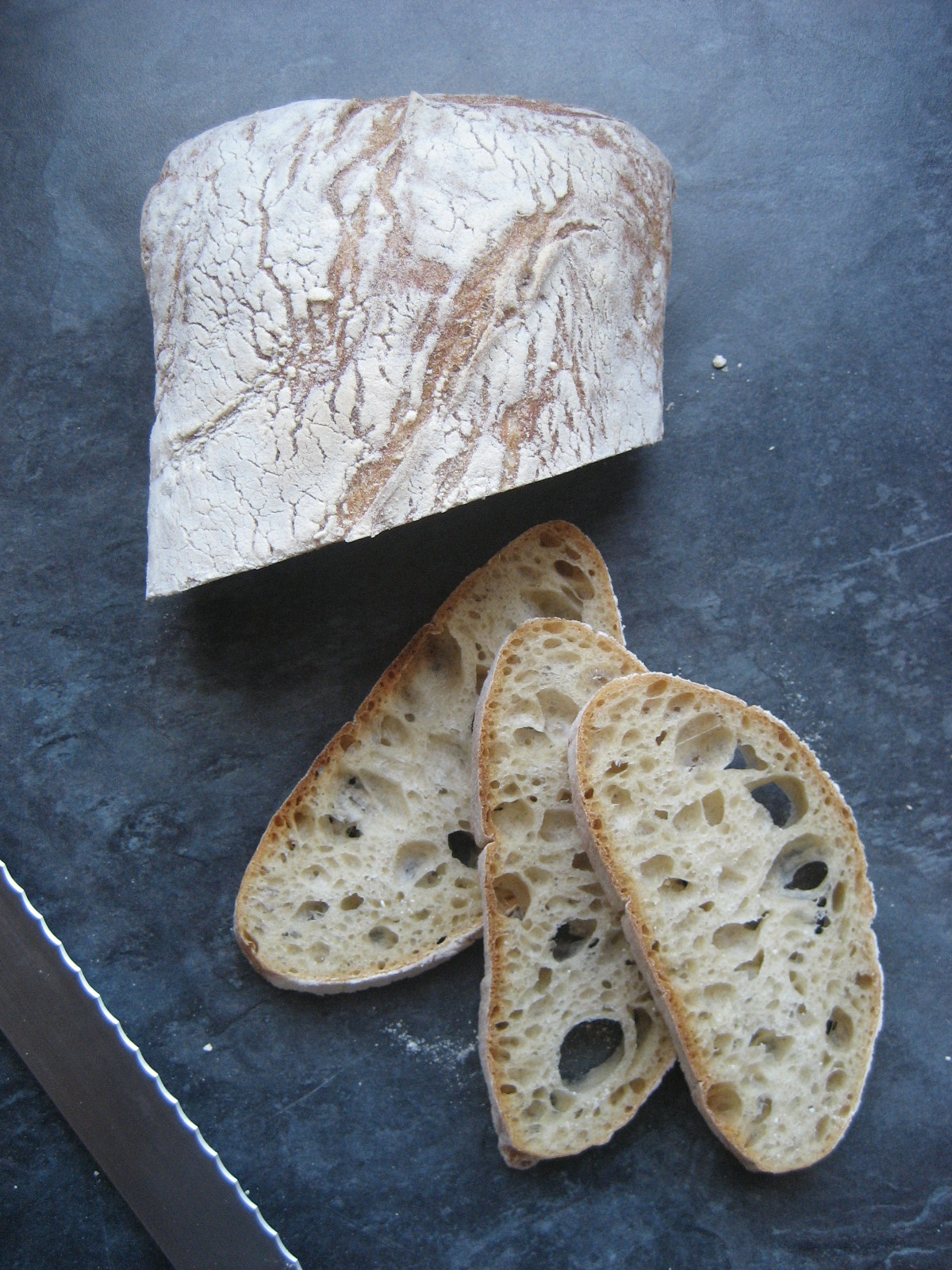
- Type: Bread
- Place of origin: Italy
- Region or state: Veneto
- Main ingredients: Wheat flour or whole-wheat flour, water, yeast, salt

Ciabatta (/tʃəˈbɑːtə, -ˈbæt-/, Italian: [tʃaˈbatta]; lit. 'slipper') is an Italian white bread created in 1982 by a baker in Adria, in the region of Veneto, in response to the popularity of French baguettes. Ciabatta is somewhat elongated, broad, and flat, and is baked in many variations, although distinctive for its large holes. Ciabatta is made with a strong flour and uses a very high hydration dough.

== Etymology ==
The name was given to the bread because of its flat, oval shape. In Italian, the word ciabatta means 'carpet slipper'.

== Italy ==
Ciabatta bread was first produced in 1982, by Arnaldo Cavallari, who called the bread ciabatta polesana after Polesine, the area he lived in. The recipe was subsequently licensed by Cavallari's company, Molini Adriesi, to bakers in 11 countries by 1999. Cavallari and other bakers in Italy were concerned by the popularity of sandwiches made from baguettes imported from France, which were endangering their businesses, and so set about trying to create an Italian alternative with which to make sandwiches. The recipe for ciabatta came about after several weeks of trying variations of traditional bread recipes and consists of a soft, wet dough made with high gluten flour.

Many regions have their own variations on the original recipe or a bread that closely resembles ciabatta and has become accepted as a variety of ciabatta; the ciabatta from the area encompassing Lake Como has a crisp crust, a somewhat soft, porous texture, and is light to the touch. The ciabatta found in Tuscany, Umbria, and Marche regions varies from bread that has a firm crust and dense crumb to bread that has a crisper crust and more open texture. In Rome, it is often seasoned with marjoram.

New variations of the recipe continue to be developed. Whole-wheat ciabatta is known as ciabatta integrale, and when milk is added to the dough, it becomes ciabatta al latte.

== Other countries ==
Ciabatta bread was introduced to the United Kingdom in 1985 by Marks & Spencer, then to the United States in 1987 by Orlando Bakery, a Cleveland firm.

== See also ==
- Venetian cuisine
