= Pain de campagne =

Type of French bread

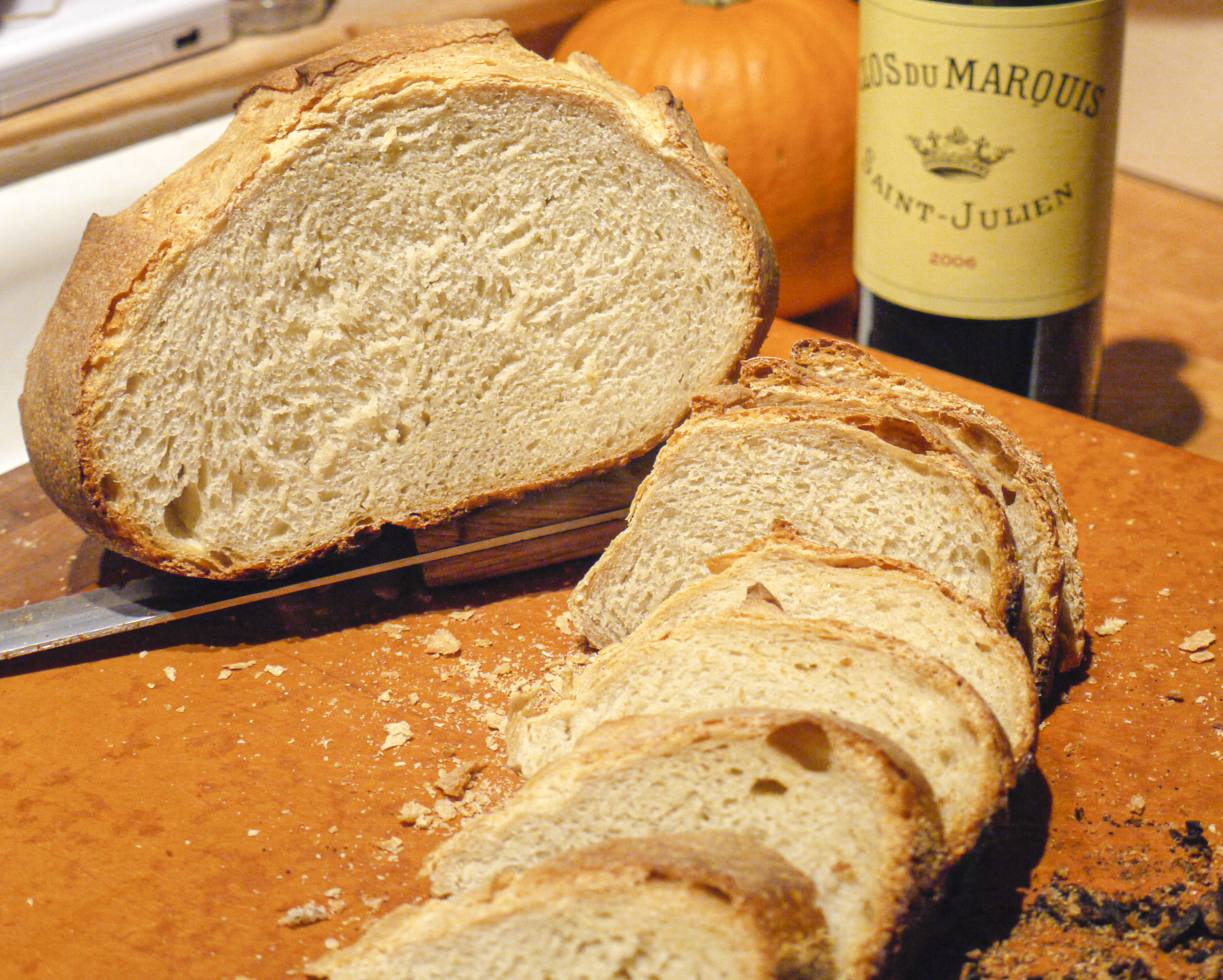
- Type: Bread
- Place of origin: France

Pain de campagne (French pronunciation: [pɛ̃ də kɑ̃paɲ], "country bread"), also called "French sourdough", is typically a large round loaf ("miche") made from either natural leavening or baker's yeast. Most traditional versions of this bread are made with a combination of white flour with whole wheat flour and/or rye flour, water, leavening and salt. For centuries, French villages had communal ovens where the townsfolk would bring their dough to be baked, and the loaves weighed from 1.5 to 5.5 kilograms (3–12 lb). Such large loaves would feed a family for days or weeks, until the next baking day.

Before the advent of roller milling, virtually all wheat was milled by stone grinding. In order to produce a lighter, less chewy bread, the whole wheat flour was sifted or bolted using mesh or cloth. This resulted in a whiter flour that still retained some of the bran and germ. The addition of rye flour in some recipes probably originates from the presence of rye growing among the wheat. All the grain was harvested together, and as much as 10 percent of it would be rye. Rye flour ferments more quickly than wheat flour, and it imparts a distinctive flavor to traditional pains de campagne.

With the rise of commercial yeast at the turn of the 20th century, pain de campagne fell out of favor in French cities, where it was replaced by the baguette. However, with the rise of artisan breads in the 1970s, pain de campagne has been growing in popularity, both in Europe and the US.

Today pain de campagne is still made in France, and is enjoying a growing appreciation in the United States and the UK. When made traditionally, the dough is allowed to ferment for several hours, allowing the yeasts to grow and develop the flavors. The dough is then rounded and placed in linen-lined baskets called "bannetons". After the dough has risen, it is dumped out of the basket and onto peel, and slid into the oven where it bakes at around 230 °C (450 °F) for about 50 minutes.

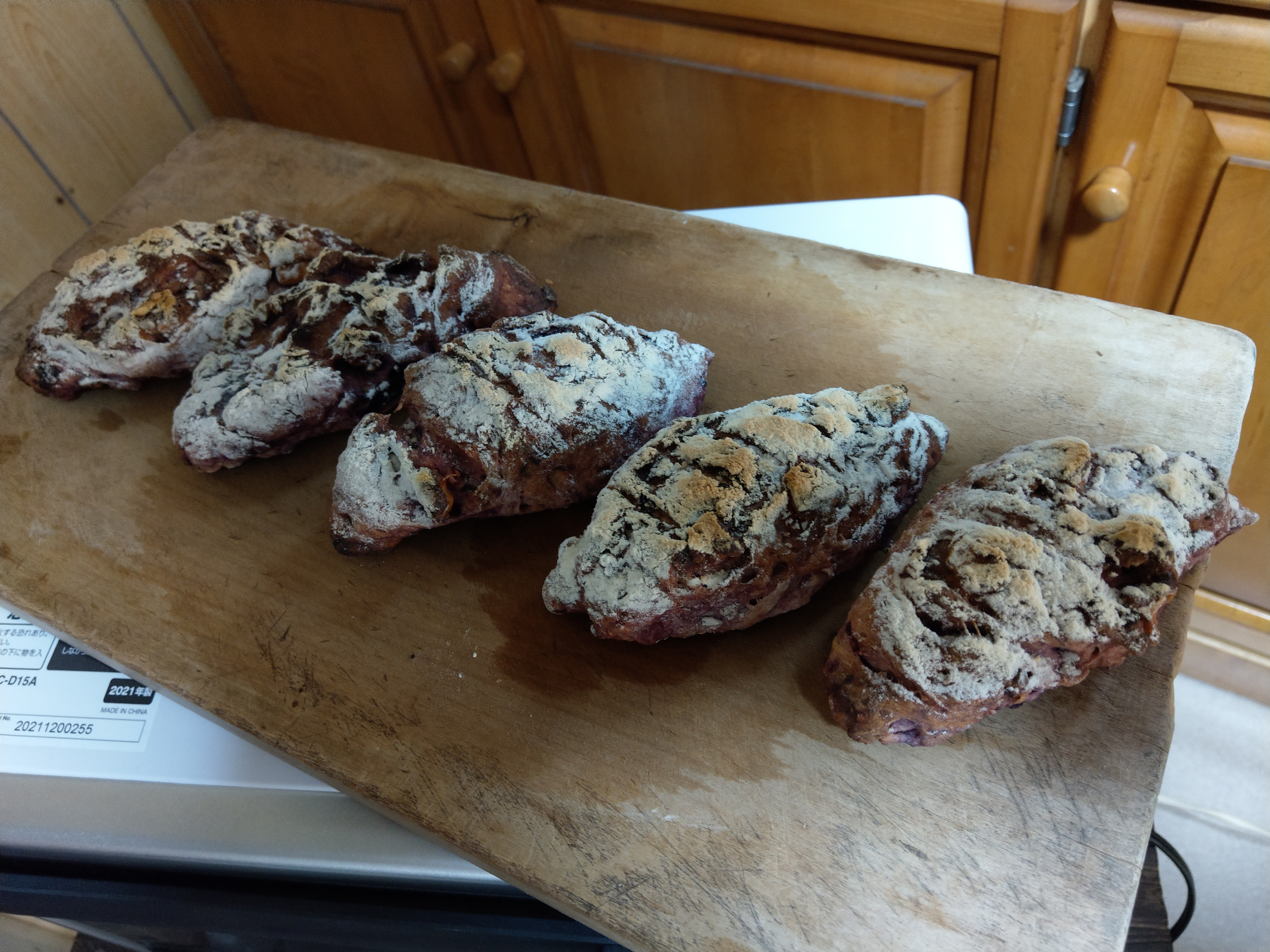
Pain de campagne melanges (French hard bread with walnuts and various red fruits)

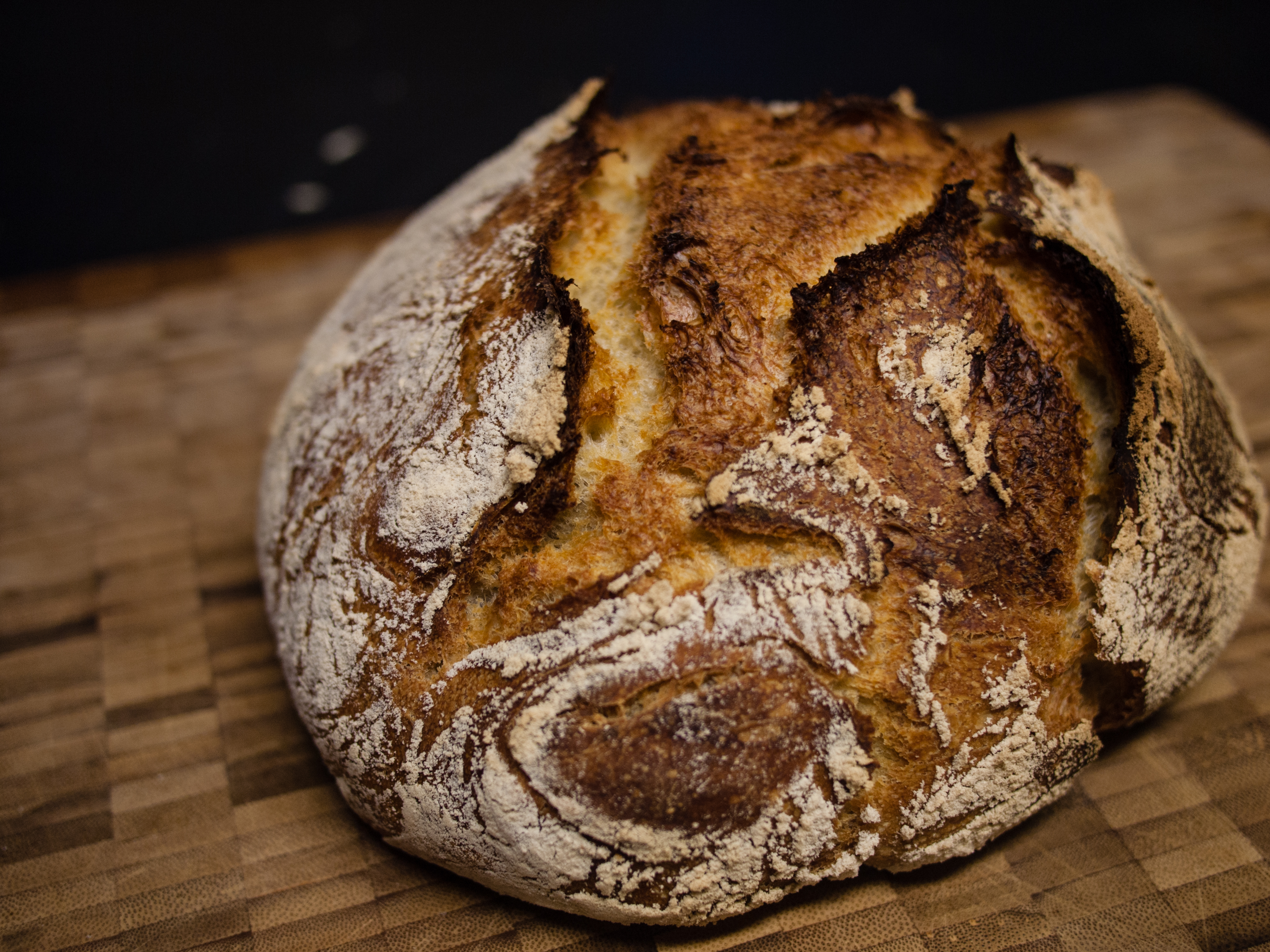
