= Faluche (bread) =

Traditional French bread

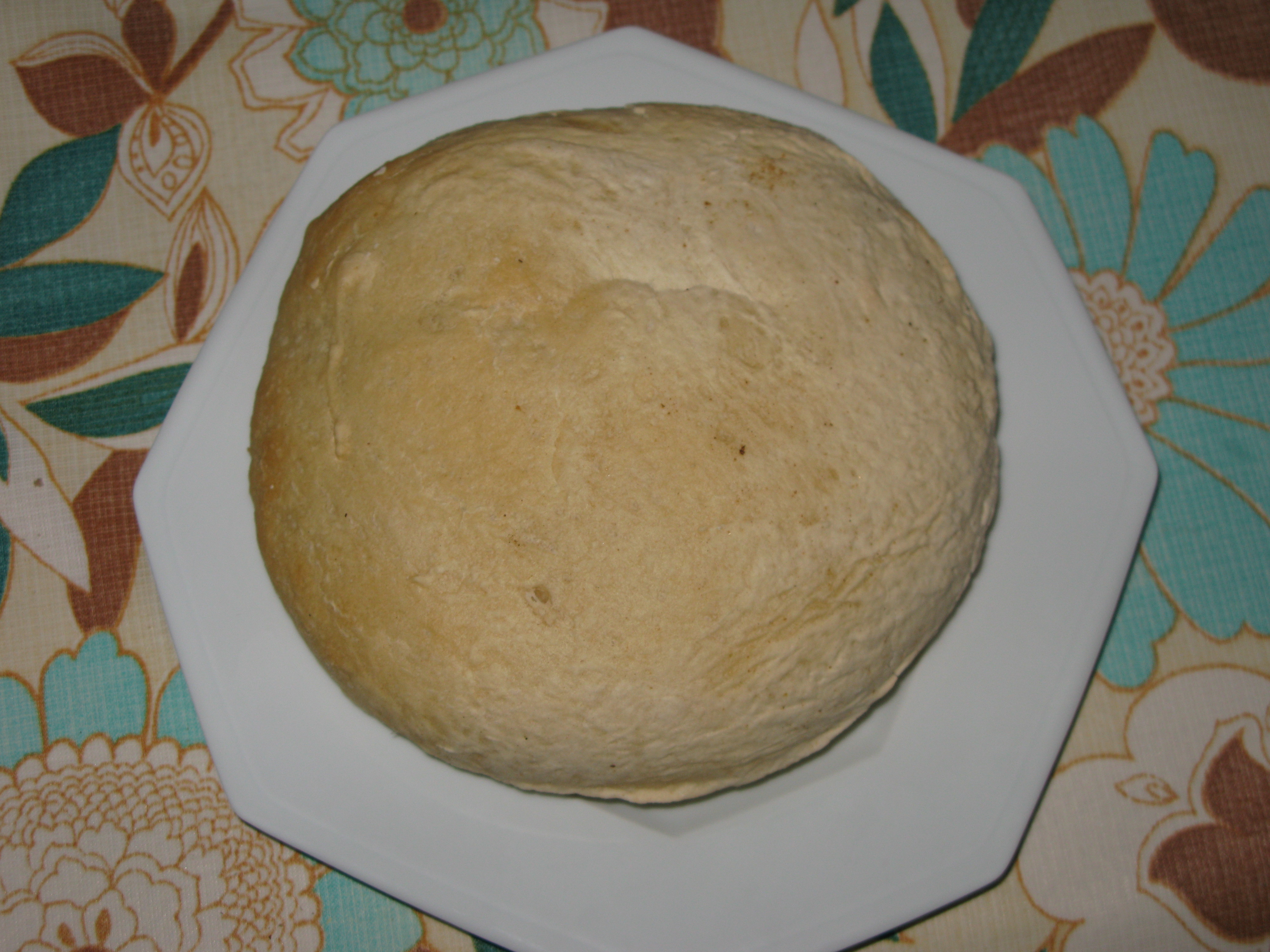
- Type: Bread
- Place of origin: France
- Region or state: Nord-Pas-de-Calais
- Main ingredients: Flour, baker's yeast, water, salt, oil

Faluche is a traditional bread in the Nord-Pas-de-Calais region of northern France and the Tournai region of southern Belgium.

Faluche is a pale white bread that is soft and fairly dense. It is neither a round nor flat bread but looks somewhat like a small deflated soccer ball. It may be eaten hot at breakfast with butter and jam or with cream cheese and smoked salmon or later as a snack with butter and brown sugar or with brie cheese. Faluche is made with white flour, baker's yeast, water, a little salt and butter. In a bakery, faluche was often baked as the oven was just heating up before the main baking.
