= Baguette =

Long French white bread

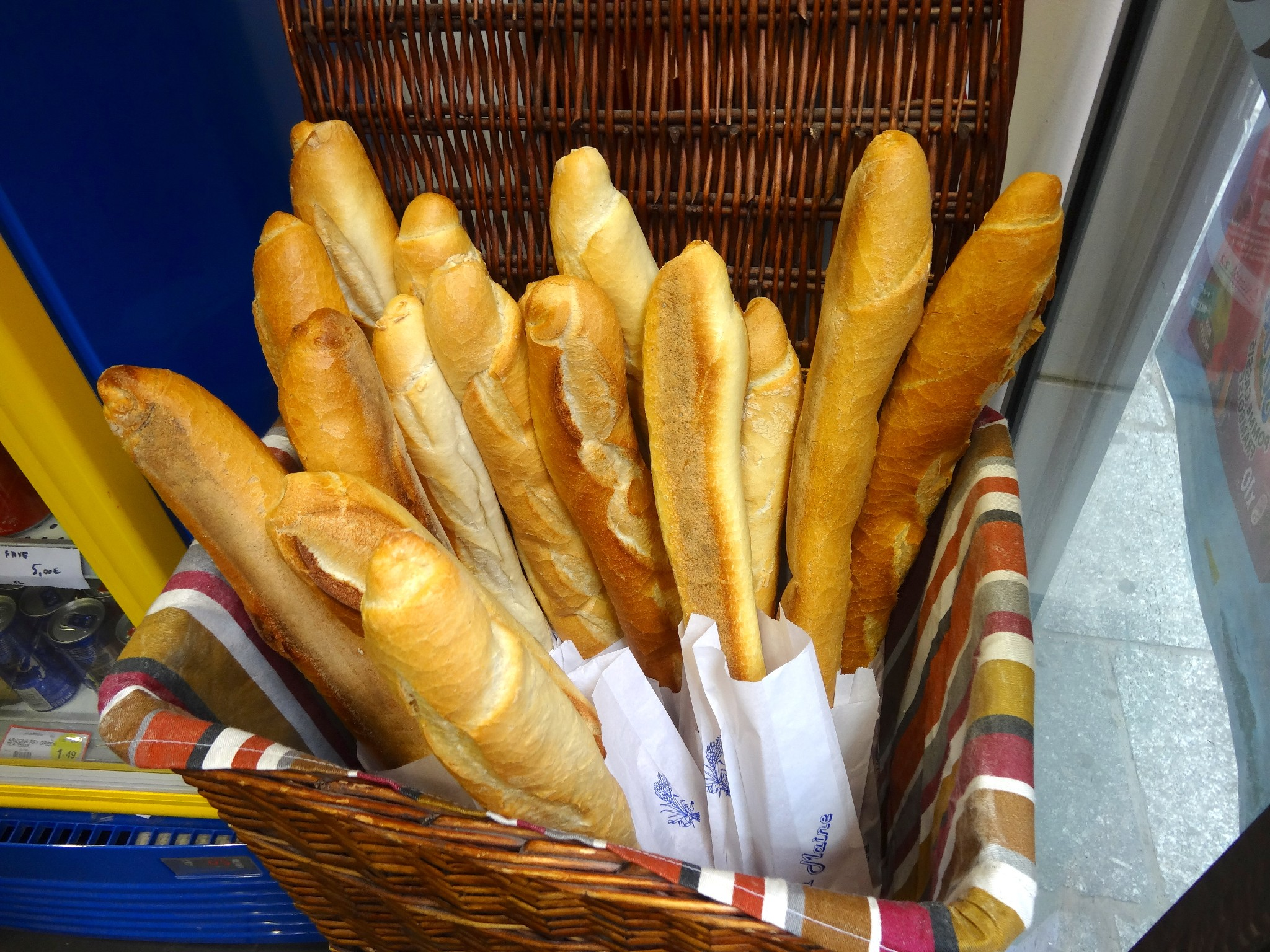
- A basket of baguettes
- Alternative names: French stick
- Type: White bread
- Place of origin: France
- Main ingredients: Flour, yeast, salt
- Variations: Bánh mì
- Food energy (per serving): 263 kcal (1,100 kJ)
- Other information: Glycaemic load 47 (100g)

A baguette (/bæˈɡɛt/; French: [baɡɛt]) is a long, thin type of bread commonly made from basic lean dough. The dough of the traditional baguette is defined by French law. It is distinguishable by its length and crisp crust.

A baguette has a diameter of about 5 to 6 cm (2–2 1/2 in) and a usual length of about 65 cm (26 in), but can be up to 1 m (39 in) long.

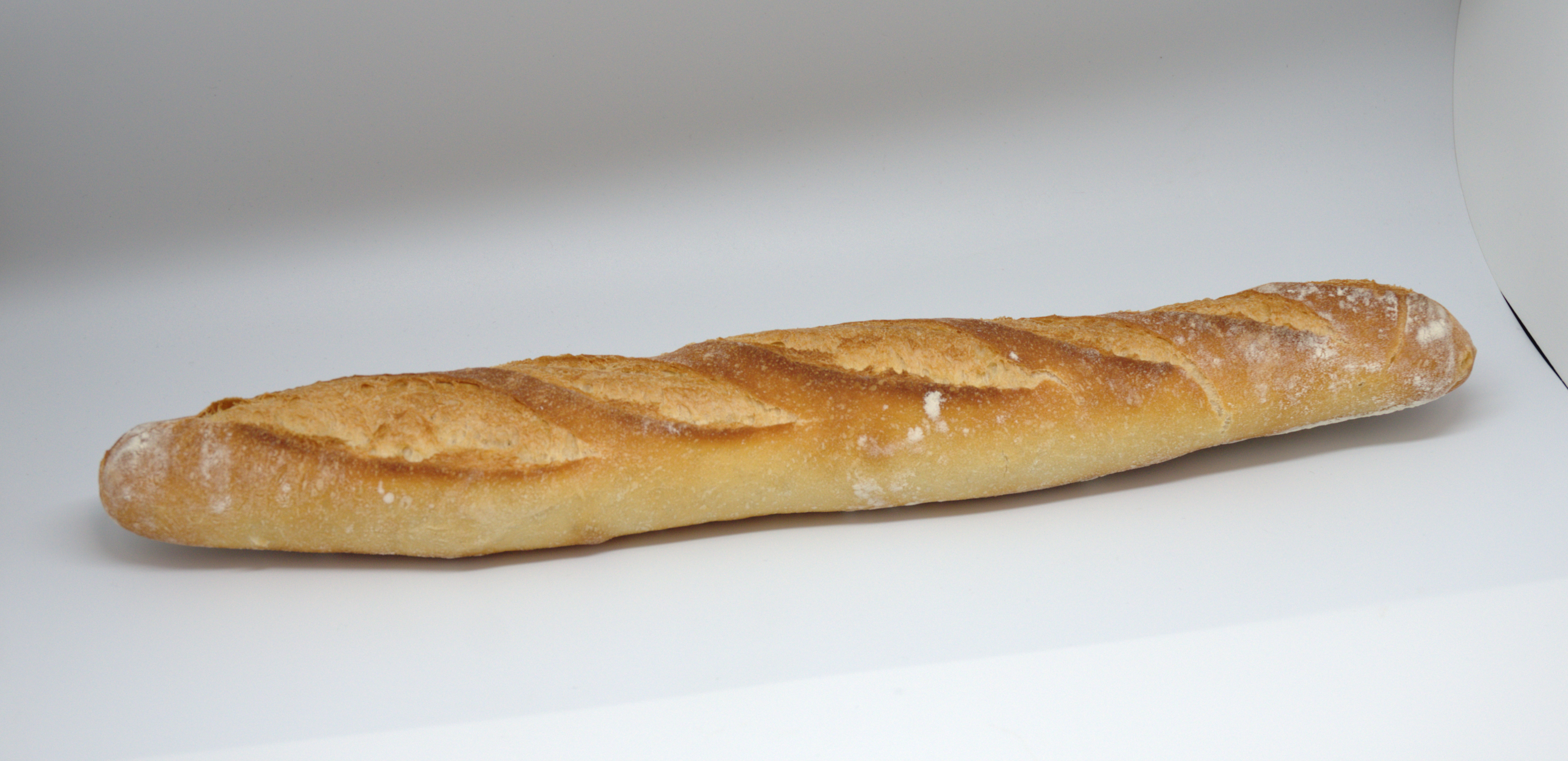
Classic baguette

In November 2018, documentation surrounding the "craftsmanship and culture" of making this bread was added to the French Ministry of Culture's National Inventory of Intangible Cultural Heritage. In 2022, the artisanal know-how and culture of baguette bread was inscribed to the UNESCO Intangible Cultural Heritage Lists.

== History ==
Much of the history of the baguette is speculation; however, some facts can be established. Long, stick-like breads in France became more popular during the 18th century, French bakers started using "gruau," a highly refined Hungarian high-milled flour in the early 19th century, Viennese steam oven baking was introduced to Paris in 1839 by August Zang, and the Austrian Adolf Ignaz Mautner von Markhof's compact yeast in 1867 at the Universal Exposition. Finally, the word "baguette" appears to define a particular type of bread in a regulation of the department of the Seine in August 1920: "The baguette, having a minimum weight of 80 g [2 3/4 oz] and a maximum length of 40 cm [16 in], may not be sold for a price higher than 0.35 francs apiece". No one of these events constitutes "the invention of the baguette," but together they define the modern "baguette."

In summary, "the bread which became known as the baguette first appeared in its most primitive form in the eighteenth century, then experienced several refinements and variations before being (officially) given that name in 1920."

The word baguette means "wand," "baton," or "stick," as in baguette magique (magic wand), baguettes chinoises (chopsticks), or baguette de direction (conductor's baton). It was first recorded as a kind of bread in 1920.

Outside France, the baguette is often considered a symbol of French culture, but the association of France with long loaves long predates it. Long, wide loaves had been made since the time of King Louis XIV, long thin ones since the mid-18th century, and by the 19th century, some were far longer than today's baguette: "... loaves of bread six feet [1.8 m] long that look like crowbars!" "Housemaids were hurrying homewards with their purchases for various Gallic breakfasts, and the long sticks of bread, a yard or two [0.9 m to 1.8 m] in length, carried under their arms, made an odd impression upon me."

A less direct link can be made with deck or steam ovens. These combine a traditional gas-fired oven and a brick oven, a thick "deck" of stone or firebrick heated by natural gas instead of wood. The first steam oven was brought to Paris in the early 19th century by August Zang, who also introduced Vienna bread (pain viennois) and the croissant, and whom some French sources thus credit with originating the baguette.

Deck ovens heated to over 200 °C (390 °F) use steam injection to allow the crust to expand before setting, thus creating a lighter, airier loaf, and to melt the dextrose on the bread's surface, giving a slightly glazed effect.

In April 1944, a competition called Le Grand Prix de la Baguette began in France to determine who made the best baguettes. Nearly 200 bakers compete each year in front of a 14-judge panel following strict guidelines. They are judged based on baking, appearance, smell, taste, and crumb. The winner receives €4000 and supplies France's president with their daily bread for that year until a new winner is chosen.

Following the World Wars, French bakers began baking a whiter, softer baguette that contrasted with the darker loaves produced because of rationing during the wars. These doughs took less time to ferment and used more additives but had significantly less taste. They also began using pre-made dough and molds. The average consumption of bread fell from 600 grams/day in the early 1900s to 170 grams/day in 1986.

In 1993, the French Parliament passed Le Décret Pain (The Bread Decree). Le Décret Pain states that breads under the name of pain maison (homemade bread) must be "fully kneaded, shaped, and baked at their place of sale." This decree also placed strict guidelines on what pain traditionnel français (traditional French bread) is allowed to be made of, banning pre-made dough from being used for traditional French baguettes.

Since 1994, the city of Paris awards the Grand prix de la baguette de tradition française de la ville de Paris for the best baguette in the city.

=== Origin myths ===
Because the history of the French baguette is not completely known, several myths have spread about the origins of this type of bread.

Some say Napoleon, in essence, created the French baguette to allow soldiers to more easily carry bread with them. Since the round shape of other breads took up a lot of space, Bonaparte requested they be made into the skinny stick shape with specific measurements to slide into the soldiers' uniform.

Other stories credit baguettes as being an invention to stop French metro workers from having to carry knives that they used to cut their bread. The workers often fought, so the management did not want them to carry knives and requested that bread be easily ripped apart, ending the need for knives. The skinny, easily rippable shape of a baguette would have been the response to this.

Some believe baguettes were the "Bread of Equality" following a decree post-French Revolution requiring a type of bread to be made accessible to the rich and poor.

Another account states that in October 1920, a law prevented bakers from working before 4 am, making it impossible to make traditional round loaves in time for customers' breakfasts. Switching from the round loaf to the previously less-common, slender shape of the baguette solved the problem because it could be prepared and baked much more quickly. The law in question appears to be one from March 1919, though some say it took effect in October 1920:

It is forbidden to employ workers at bread and pastry making between ten in the evening and four in the morning.

== Manufacture and styles ==
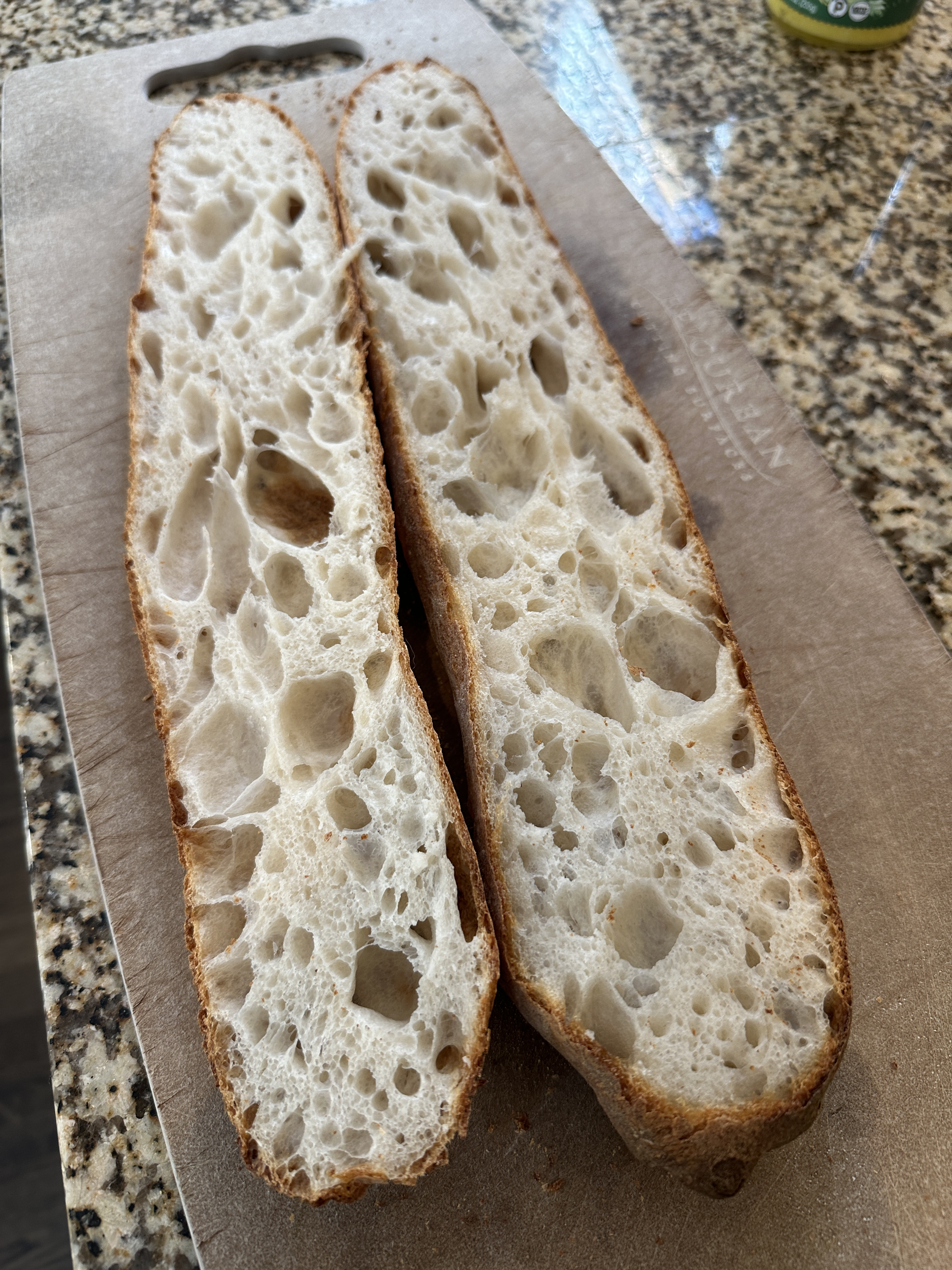
Baguette cross section

The "baguette de tradition française" is made from wheat flour, water, yeast (as the leavening agent), and common salt. It may contain up to 2% broad bean flour, up to 0.5% soya flour, and up to 0.3% wheat malt flour.

Standard baguettes, baguettes ordinaires, are made with baker's yeast, and artisan-style loaves are usually made with a pre-ferment (poolish) to increase flavor complexity and other characteristics. They may include whole-wheat flour or other grains such as rye. Baguettes are also sometimes referred to as either "Classique" (typically mass produced and made with yeast as well as additives), and "tradition" regulated to 4 ingredients (flour, water, leavening, and salt) often using a sourdough starter as the leavening agent

Baguettes are closely connected to France, though they are made worldwide. In France, not all long loaves are baguettes; for example, a short, almost rugby ball-shaped loaf is a bâtard (literally, bastard); its origin is variously explained but undocumented. Another tubular-shaped loaf is known as a flûte, also known in the United States as a parisienne. Flûtes closely resemble baguettes but are about twice the size.

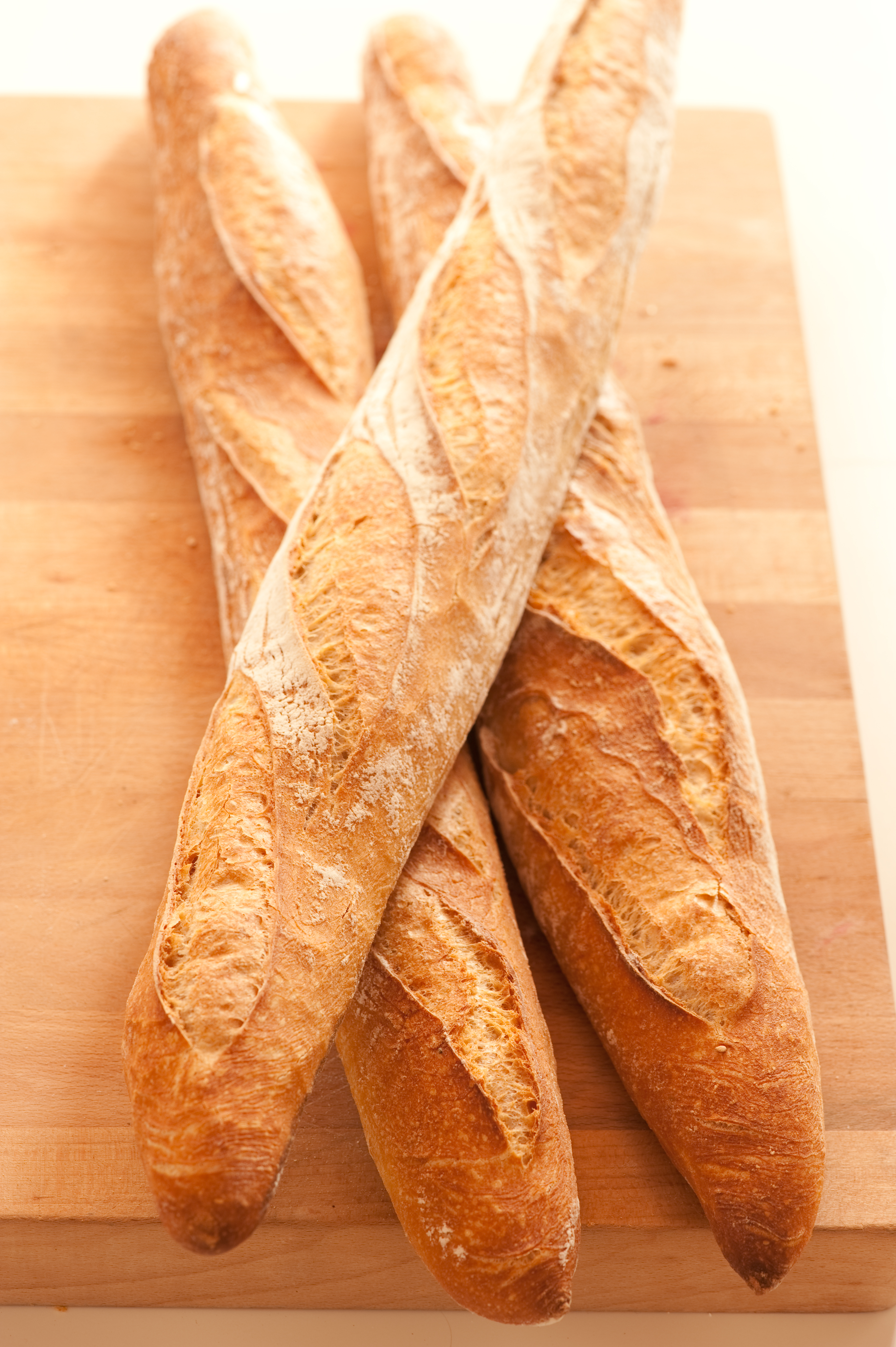
Tradition baguettes

A thinner loaf is called a ficelle (string). A short baguette is sometimes known as a baton (stick), or in the UK, referred to using the English translation French stick. None of these is officially defined, either legally or, for instance, in major dictionaries, any more than the baguette. French breads are also made in forms such as a miche, which is a large pan loaf, and a boule, literally ball in French, a large round loaf. Sandwich-sized loaves are sometimes known as demi-baguettes or tiers. Italian baguettes, or baguette italienne, involve more spices and a denser texture, giving the baguette a slightly different, more Italian taste. Pain viennois is much sweeter and softer than the standard baguette.

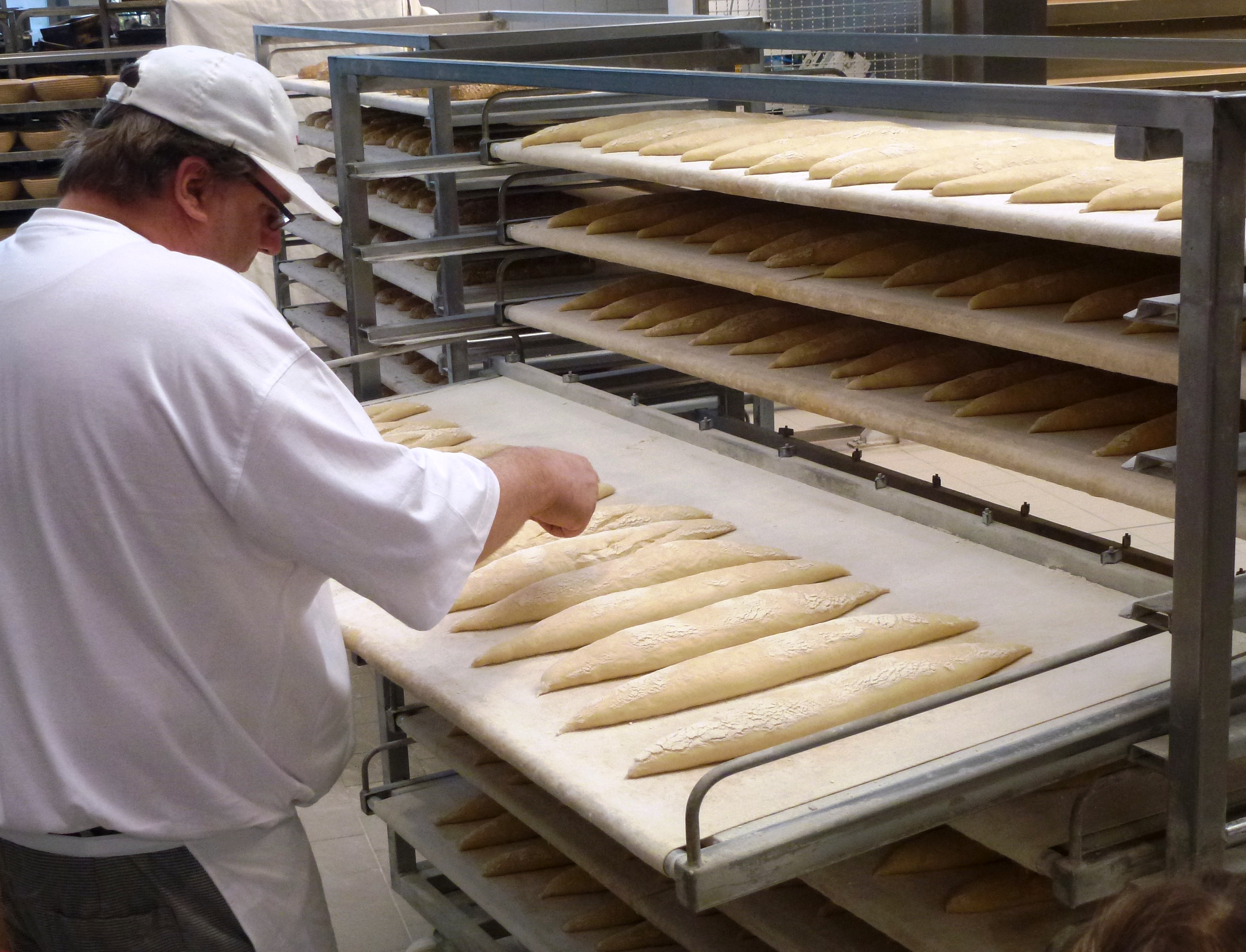
A baker prepares baguettes for baking

In France, a baguette typically weighs around 250 g (8 3/4 oz), a bâtard 500 g (17 1/2 oz) and a ficelle 100 g (3 1/2 oz); no legal text establishes any of these weights, which can vary throughout the country. Baguettes, either relatively short single-serving size or cut from a longer loaf, are very often used for sandwiches, usually of the submarine sandwich type, but also a panini. They are often sliced and served with pâté or cheese. As part of the traditional continental breakfast in France, slices of baguette, known as tartines, are spread with butter and jam and sometimes dunked in bowls of coffee or hot chocolate.

Baguettes are generally made as partially free-form loaves, with the loaf formed with a series of folding and rolling motions, raised in cloth-lined baskets or in rows on a flour-impregnated towel, called a couche, and baked either directly on the hearth of a deck oven or in special perforated pans designed to hold the shape of the baguette while allowing heat through the perforations. American-style "French bread" is generally much fatter and is not baked in deck ovens but in convection ovens.

As of the 2000s, there is increasing customer demand in France for only partially baked baguettes. In 2004, the bakery chain Marie Blachère introduced the option to select three varieties of baguettes distinguished by baking time: bien cuite (well done), dorée (golden) and blanche (white).

Outside France, baguettes are also made with other doughs. For example, the Vietnamese bánh mì uses a high proportion of rice flour, while many North American bakeries make whole wheat, multigrain, and sourdough baguettes alongside French-style loaves. In Cambodia, it is found in the form of a hot sandwich filled called num pang. In addition, even classic French-style recipes vary from place to place, with some recipes adding small amounts of milk, butter, sugar, or malt extract, depending on the desired flavor and properties in the final loaf.

== Consumption ==
Algeria consumes about 49 million baguettes per day, and France consumes about 30 million.

== See also ==
- Bolillo
- Breakfast roll
- Chicken fillet roll
- Ciabatta
- Cuban bread
- Faluche
- French roll
- Hoagie roll
- Mitraillette
- Pandesal
- Zapiekanka
