= Pre-ferment =

Process in some methods of bread making

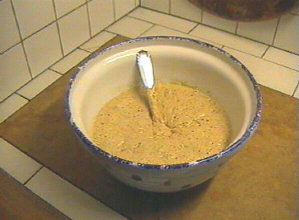
Pain pouliche, a pre-ferment

A pre-ferment (also known as bread starter) is a fermentation starter used in indirect methods of bread making. It may also be called mother dough.

A pre-ferment and a longer fermentation in the bread-making process have several benefits: there is more time for yeast, enzyme and, if sourdough, bacterial actions on the starch and proteins in the dough; this in turn improves the keeping time of the baked bread, and it creates greater complexity of flavor. Though pre-ferments have declined in popularity as direct additions of yeast in bread recipes have streamlined the process on a commercial level, pre-ferments of various forms are widely used in artisanal bread recipes and formulas.

== Classifications ==
In general, there are two pre-ferment varieties: sponges, based on baker's yeast, and the starters of sourdough, based on wild yeasts and lactic acid bacteria. (Note: Some bakers, however, use the term to refer only to the yeast variety.) There are several kinds of pre-ferment commonly named and used in bread baking. They all fall on a varying process and time spectrum, from a mature mother dough of many generations of age to a first-generation sponge based on a fresh batch of baker's yeast:

- Biga and poolish (or pouliche) are terms used in Italian and French baking, respectively, for sponges made with domestic baker's yeast. Poolish is a fairly wet sponge (typically one-to-one, this is made with a one-part-flour-to-one-part-water ratio by weight), and it is called biga liquida, whereas the "normal" biga is usually drier. Bigas can be held longer at their peak than wetter sponges, while a poolish is one known technique to increase a dough's extensibility.
- Sourdough starter is likely the oldest, being reliant on organisms present in the grain and local environment. In general, these starters have fairly complex microbiological makeups, the most notable including wild yeasts, lactobacillus, and acetobacteria in symbiotic relationship referred to as a SCOBY. They are often maintained over long periods of time. For example, the Boudin Bakery in San Francisco has used the same starter dough for over 150 years. A roughly synonymous term in French baking is levain.
- Mother dough often refers to a sourdough, and in this context the term starter often refers to all or a piece of mother dough; however, mother dough may also refer to a first-generation yeast sponge; so the process used in relation to the ingredients and fermentation times is important to understanding yeast versus sourdough methods. A roughly synonymous term used in French baking is Chef.
- Old dough (pâte fermentée) may be made with yeast or sourdough cultures, and in essence consists of a piece of dough reserved from a previous batch, with more flour and water added to feed the remaining flora. Because this is a piece of old dough, it has the typical ingredient of salt to distinguish it from other pre-ferments. (Note: Some processes reserve a piece of pre-ferment before incorporating and mixing the remainder with the final dough, this reserved piece of old dough does not imply any salt content, unless it was added to the initial pre-ferment.) Once old dough had rested for an additional 10 hours of age, the French named it Levain de Chef.

== History ==
There is no credible explanation for the origin of the term poolish. The common, but undocumented, origin given is that it was first used by Polish bakers around 1840, hence its name, and as a method was brought to France in the beginning of the 1920s. "Poolish" however is an old English version of "Polish", whereas the term seems to be most used in France (where "polonais" is the word for "Polish"). Some nineteenth-century sources use the homophone "pouliche", a French word that typically means a filly. With either spelling, the term only appears in French sources towards the last part of the nineteenth century.

== Use ==
A pre-ferment is easy to make and usually consists of a simple mixture of wheat flour, water, and a leavening agent (typically yeast). Two schools of thought exist regarding the inclusion of salt or sugar. They both act to inhibit or slow yeast growth, as determined by time to proof or rise, so they are not usually included and instead are added to the final dough. Ultimately, the amounts of each ingredient, and when they are added, depend on pre-ferment and final-dough formulas.

In some countries (mainly Eastern Europe, Baltic and Nordic countries) rye flour is also used to make a starter. Traditional Finnish rye starter consists of only rye flour and water, no sugar or yeast. Some might also use yogurt to help hasten the starter to rise.

A flour-to-water ratio of 1-to-1 results in a relatively fluid pre-ferment. Stiffer doughs, such as 2-to-1, may also be used. After mixing it is allowed to ferment for a period of time, and then is added to the final dough as a substitute for or in addition to more yeast. There are distinctly different brew types of pre-ferments designed for computer-controlled bakeries that use a rather different series of ingredients, including oxidizers, needed for continuous dough-production processes.

Fermentation is sometimes performed in a warm place, or a humidity- and temperature-controlled environment. Cooler-than-room or refrigeration temperatures decelerate growth and increase the time interval, while slightly warmer temperatures accelerate growth and decrease the time interval. Too warm a temperature slows growth, while even higher temperatures will kill the yeast. Death of the yeast cells occurs in the range of 50–60 °C (122–140 °F). When cooling a levain or sourdough pre-ferment, if the dough temperature drops below 10 °C (50 °F) it affects the culture and leads to the loss of a particular aroma in the baked bread.

To allow room for the pre-ferment to rise, the ingredients are mixed in a container at least four or five times their volume. This is about the point in time when some process similarities of yeast pre-ferments to sourdough or levain starters begins to diverge. The typical amounts of time allotted for the yeast pre-ferment period may range from 2–16 hours, depending on the dough's temperature and the added amount of viable yeast, often expressed as a bakers' percentage. Spontaneous sourdough starters take, at a minimum, several days, and are subject to many variables.

To make a sourdough starter from scratch, the minimum-needed ingredients are flour, water, and time. This starter is maintained with daily feedings or refreshments of fresh flour and water or, new dough. It ferments at room temperature until the desired age or minimal number of refreshments, following a refreshment schedule that may include acceleration of time intervals leading into the final dough, then is added to the final dough. When maintaining a starter's existing weight, it is advised to discard 60% (or more) of the starter, replacing that discarded dough with new dough. If an increased amount of starter is required, simply add new dough. 40-parts-to-60-parts of old-dough-to-new-dough by weight, or 2-to-3, is known as the back-slopping ratio, and changes to that ratio change the pH of the just-refreshed dough. To make a primary-culture levain, Raymond Calvel used salt, but less of it than would be typical for many final-dough formulas. (Note: When expressed as a bakers' percentage based on newly-added flour weight, Calvel's first dough included 0.5% salt and all remaining refreshments received 0.33% salt. Malt was added to only the first two sequential doughs. The back-slopping ratio expressed as old-dough-to-new-dough was in the range of 62.1-62.4%. Only the first dough rested for 22 hours. Refreshment intervals were accelerated first to 7 hours for two succeeding refreshments, then 6 hours for another three. Baker's yeast was not used. In somewhat of an oxymoronic sense this was named, "Naturally fermented sponge.")

== See also ==
- Proofing (baking technique)
- Straight dough
