= Hearth bread =

Rustic or artisan bread

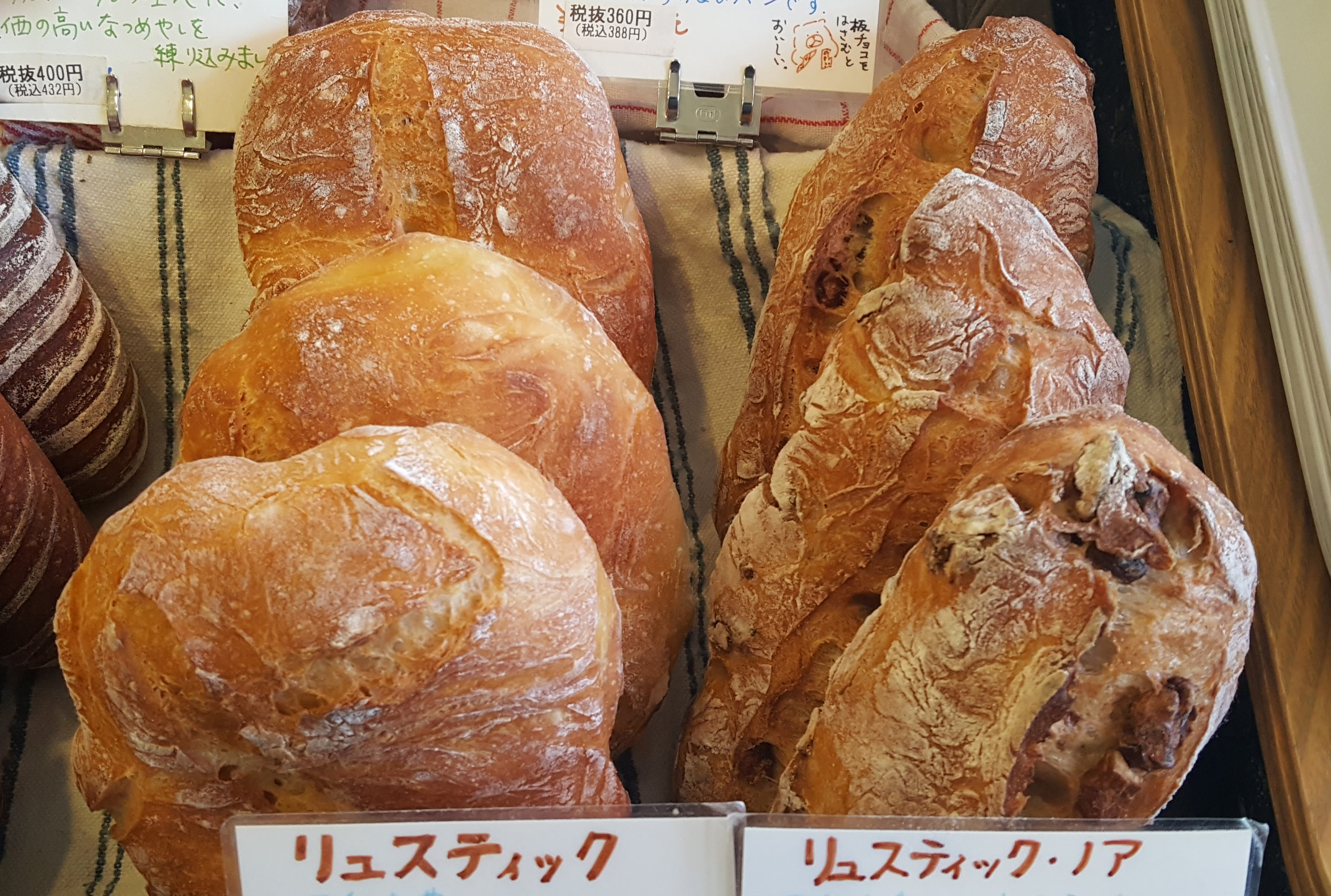
Rustic breads made by artisan bakers

Hearth bread (also known as rustic bread, artisan bread, sometimes "French bread") is a loaf baked at high temperature, frequently using steam, that is both crusty and chewy. High temperatures up to 500 °F (260 °C) are possible due to the use of lean doughs. If the dough contains significant amounts of natural sugar (produced during the longer fermentation) or sugars or oil are added to the dough, lower temperatures are used.

Hearth breads are frequently made in a traditional way: a piece of fermented dough is baked without a bread pan on the heated floor of a hearth oven. This type of "freestanding" bread is produced in a wide variety of local shapes and styles and is popular at small bakeries. The well-known shapes include baguette, batard (a shorter version of baguette), ficelle, Parisian (a large loaf), boule, Vienna bread, and a crusty hard roll.

The typical traits of the hearth breads include crisp crust with cracks and nut-like flavor, and creamy crumb. They can be produced by straight dough, sourdough, and sponge-dough processes. Hearth breads can be also made from rye flour (a mix of rye and wheat flour). Rye breads are popular in Northern and Eastern Europe.

== French ==
The "French" label points to the European (French and Italian) origin of the best known hearth breads, but the current production is spread worldwide, and the term covers a wider variety of breads than what is popular in France. For example, the bakeries in France use lean dough, so their products go stale very quickly (hours); some North American producers add richening ingredients (disallowed in this type of bread in France, such as shortening and sweeteners) to adapt to the American palate and improve shelf life.

== North America ==
The uniquely American San Francisco sourdough bread dates back to the California gold rush of the late 1840s to early 1850s.

The renaissance of small- and medium-size bakeries in the United States and Canada in the late 20th century is directly related to the popularity of hearth breads. The demand for hearth bread in the U.S. began with the natural foods movement in the 1960s and gained popularity across the country through the 1970s and 1980s. By the late 1980s, hearth bread was experiencing a major resurgence in bakeries throughout California, Washington, New England, and New York.

American bakers of artisan breads prefer to use unbleached refined flour with a range of protein content of 11.5–14%, ash 0.48–0.80% (on the 14% moisture basis, falling number of 250–290 seconds, farinograph absorption of 60±2% and stability of 10±2 minutes. Multiple specialized flours are produced for these bakeries.

== Process ==
When viewed from the baking process perspective, the artisan bread attributes are:

1. lean dough (flour water, salt, leavening based on commercial yeast or Lactobacillus). The only additional ingredients for the regular breads are malt flour and ascorbic acid. Typically the high hydration doughs are used.
2. baking on the hearth, mostly avoiding the use of the bread pan;
3. gentle mixing to preserve the color of carotinoid pigments of the endosperm. Minimal mixing might favor use of weaker doughs, as strong (high-gluten) doughs might not be able to fully develop and thus will reduce the final volume of the loaf;
4. long fermentation and use of high-ash flourfor flavor development;
5. gentle shaping by hand or minimal machine shaping;
6. avoiding the use of dough conditioners, with flour variations addressed through process changes;
7. quality goals of flavor, aroma, creamy open crumb textures, and crispiness of the crust

== Sources ==
- Collar, Concha (2015-09-22). "Role of Bread on Nutrition and Health Worldwide". In Rosell, Cristina M.; Bajerska, Joanna; Sheikha, Aly F. El (eds.). Bread and Its Fortification (PDF). Boca Raton: CRC Press. pp. 26–52. ISBN 978-1-4987-0157-0.
- Reinhart, P.; Manville, R. (2011). "Hearth Breads". Peter Reinhart's Whole Grain Breads: New Techniques, Extraordinary Flavor [A Baking Book]. Clarkson Potter/Ten Speed. ISBN 978-1-60774-130-5.
- Ross, Andrew S. (2018). "Flour Quality and Artisan Bread" (PDF). Cereal Foods World. 63 (2): 56–62. doi:10.1094/CFW-63-2-0056.
- Wrigley, Colin (2010). "Hearth breads". Cereal Grains: Assessing and Managing Quality. Woodhead Publishing Series in Food Science, Technology and Nutrition. Woodhead Publishing. ISBN 978-1-84569-952-9.
- Wrigley, C.W.; Corke, H.; Seetharaman, K.; Faubion, J. (2015). "Hearth Breads". Encyclopedia of Food Grains. Elsevier Science. pp. 13–14. ISBN 978-0-12-394786-4.
