= Jellied moose nose =

Canadian and Alaskan Indigenous delicacy

Jellied moose nose is a traditional delicacy belonging to indigenous groups in Northern Canada and Alaska.

== Preparation ==
The white meat from the bulb of the nose and the darker meat around the bones is kept, removing the fur over fire or by boiling. The meat is then simmered in a pan with garlic, vinegar, and seasoned with spices including cinnamon, nutmeg, cloves, mustard, salt or pepper. Some versions include onions as well.

After cooking, the meat is put in a loaf pan, with the broth from the pan poured on top, and chilled in the fridge. After chilling, the jelly is cut in slices to be served, either at home or at a potlach.

== Indigenous significance ==
In many Indigenous communities in the Northwest, preserving the different parts of the moose was both religiously significant and a primary source of food, and this dish was a way of honouring the moose by using all of the different parts to provide nutrition to them, without wasting anything.
