= Kneading =

Process of preparing dough

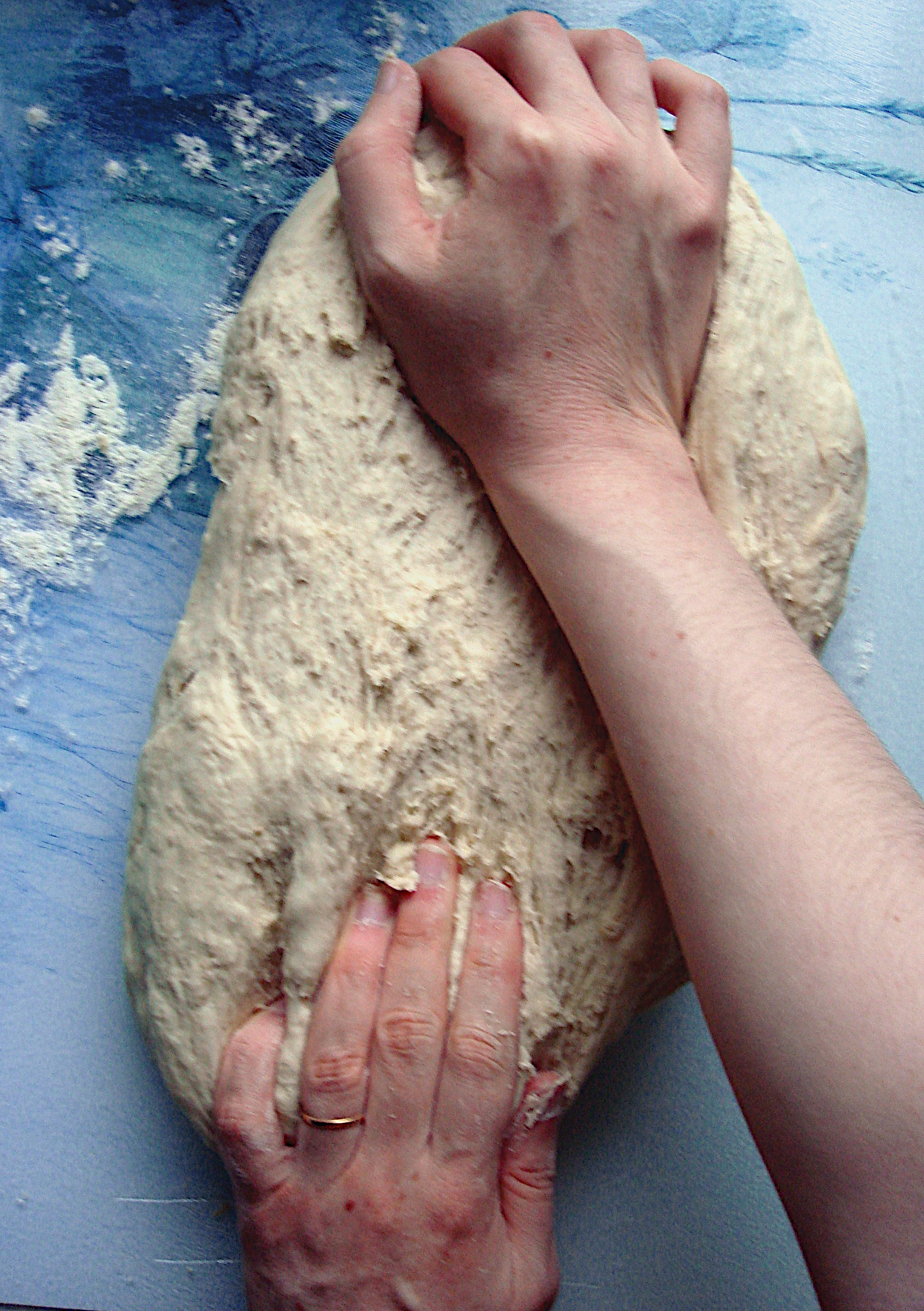
Hand kneading dough for bread

How to knead dough

In cooking (and more specifically baking), kneading is a process in the making of bread dough, used to mix the ingredients and add strength and stiffness to the final product. It shortens baking times by forming gluten structural protein complexes more quickly than would occur without kneading and incorporates air into the dough.

Kneading's importance lies in the mixing of flour with water; when these two ingredients are combined and kneaded, the gliadin and glutenin proteins in the flour expand and form strands of gluten, which gives bread its texture. (To aid gluten production, many recipes use bread flour, which is higher in protein than all-purpose flour.) The kneading process warms and stretches these gluten strands, eventually creating a springy and elastic dough.

If bread dough does not develop these gluten strands, it will not be able to hold the tiny pockets of gas (carbon dioxide) created by the leavening agent (such as yeast or baking powder), and will collapse, leaving a heavy and dense loaf.

Kneading can be performed by hand (the traditional way), with a mixer equipped with a dough hook, or with a bread machine. In hand kneading, the dough is put on a floured surface, pressed and stretched with the heel of the hand, folded over, and rotated through 90° repeatedly. This process continues until the dough becomes elastic and smooth. The dough can then be allowed to rise or "prove".

Similar to kneading is knocking back or punching down, which is done to the dough after proving. The dough is punched once or twice, after which it is kneaded gently for a short time. The aim of this is to remove any large gas pockets which have formed in the dough, create an even texture in the bread, and redistribute the nutrients for the yeast, thus allowing fermentation to continue. The dough can then be proofed a second time. Another method of knocking back (also known as "folding") is to gently stretch and pat out the proved dough before folding the sides in towards the centre.

In bread baking, kneading can be substituted by allowing a relatively wet, low-yeast dough to ferment for more than 12 hours, which allows the gluten to develop in the absence of kneading, before shaping, allowing to rise, and baking; this method is referred to as no-knead bread.

The baker must refrain from kneading doughs for pastry or quick breads such as muffins, scones, and American-style biscuits in order to prevent the development of gluten, which would give the finished products a tough, rubbery texture.

== See also ==
- Dough scraper
- Proofing (baking technique)
- Rolling pin
- Roller docker
