= No-knead bread =

Bread made from dough that is not kneaded

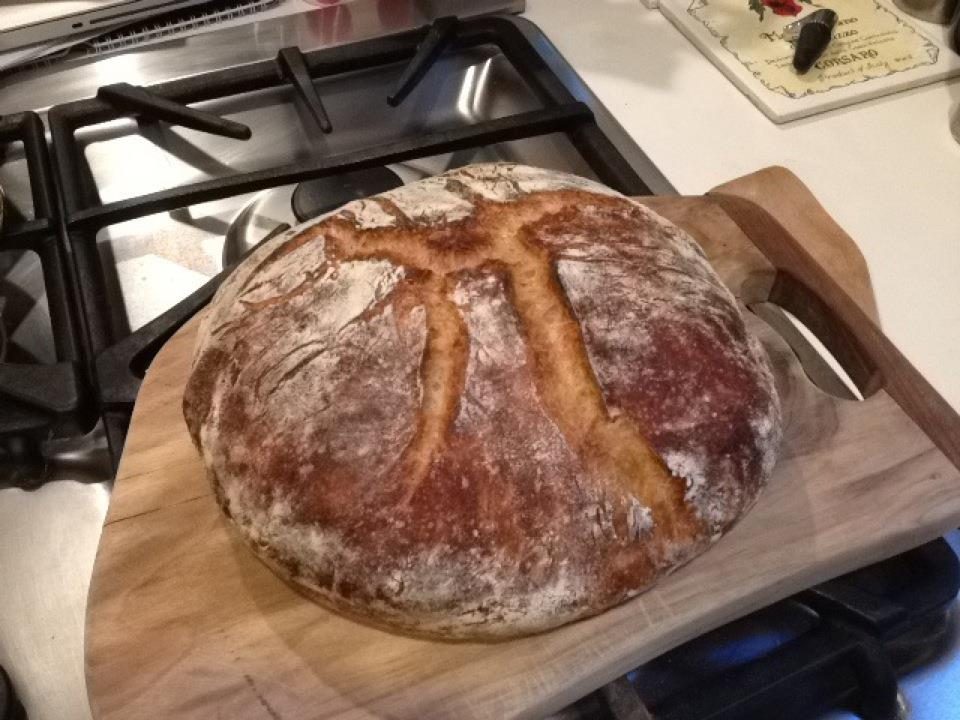
- Bread baked using the no-knead method
- Type: Bread

No-knead bread is a method of bread baking that uses a very long fermentation (rising) time instead of kneading to form the gluten strands that give the bread its texture. It is characterized by a low yeast content and a very wet dough.

Some recipes improve the quality of the crust by baking the bread in a Dutch oven or baker's cloche, another traditional method known as baking en cloche.

== Method ==
The basic method is to mix flour, water, salt, and yeast, allow it to ferment until gluten has developed—generally 12 hours or more, sometimes days when fermenting refrigerated—shape, proof, and bake. This lengthens the time required to produce a loaf of yeast bread, which by a kneaded method generally can be completed in three or four hours, but eliminates the requirement to knead.

According to one version of the method described by New York baker Jim Lahey, in his book My Bread, one loaf of the bread is made by mixing 400 g (approximately 3 cups) bread flour, 8 g (approximately 1¼ teaspoons) salt and 1 g (approximately ¼ teaspoon) instant yeast with 300 mL (approximately 1 1/3 cups) cool water to produce a 75% hydration dough.

Ingredients	Grams	Baker's %
Flour	400	100%
Salt	8	2%
Instant yeast	1	0.25%
Water	300	75%
Formula	709	

The dough is allowed to rise, covered, for 12 to 18 hours until doubled in size and covered with bubbles, then scraped onto a floured surface, given a few folds, shaped, then allowed to rise, covered, for another hour or two. It is then dropped in a pot that has been preheated in an oven at 450 °F (232 °C). The bread is baked in the covered pot for 30 minutes and, with the lid removed, for another 15 to 30 minutes until the crust is a deep brown, then removed from the pot and allowed to cool for an hour.

The method uses a long rise instead of kneading to align the dough's gluten molecules with each other so as to produce a strong, elastic network, resulting in long, sticky strands. The automatic alignment is possible because of the wetness of the dough, which makes the molecules more mobile. Wet doughs, which use a water weight of about 75% that of the flour (hydration), require more salt than conventional doughs, about 2% of the flour weight.

== History and popularization ==
No-knead bread is as old as flour and beer. Written references date as far back as The Compleat Housewife by Eliza Smith (1739).

No-knead bread became widely known to British home-bakers when British nutritionist and food writer Doris Grant (1905–2003) promoted wholemeal no-knead bread in her wartime book "Your Daily Bread" published in 1944 by Faber & Faber.

Gospel composer and song collector Albert E. Brumley published a recipe for "No-Knead Bread" in his 1972 song collection and cookbook, All-Day Singin' and Dinner on the Ground. Author Jeff Hertzberg notes a method before the late 1990s in Italy.

A no-knead bread was popularized in the 1999 cookbook No Need to Knead, written by California baker Suzanne Dunaway, published by Hyperion Books, and re-published in 2012

In 2007, Hertzberg and fellow author Zoe François published Artisan Bread in Five Minutes a Day, which uses a no-knead method of stored and refrigerated dough that is ready for use at any time during a 5- to 14-day period.

New York Times food columnist Mark Bittman described Lahey's method in his November 8, 2006 column The Minimalist. Bittman praised the bread for its "great crumb, lightness, incredible flavor [and] enviable, crackling crust." Two years later, he noted the recipe's "immediate and wild popularity", and a 2009 cookbook described Bittman's column as "one of those recipes that literally change the culinary scene with discussions on hundreds of blogs in dozens of languages around the world."
