= Sponge and dough =

Bread making process

The sponge and dough method is a two-step breadmaking process: in the first step a sponge is made and allowed to ferment for a period of time, and in the second step the sponge is added to the final dough's ingredients, creating the total formula. In this usage, synonyms for sponge are yeast starter or yeast pre-ferment. (Note: The phrases "yeast starter" and "yeast pre-ferment" may be considered oxymoronic when the context of "starter" and "pre-ferment" are referring to natural yeast or sourdough leavens which include relatively large populations of lactic acid bacteria.) In French baking the sponge and dough method is known as levain-levure. The method is reminiscent of the sourdough or levain methods; however, the sponge is made from all fresh ingredients prior to being used in the final dough. (Note: A three step, instead of two step, sponge-sponge-dough process results in a Spanish sponge-type sourdough. The first salted sponge ferments to old dough, which is added to a second sponge, itself fermented for some time, before being added to the final dough.)

== Method ==
A sponge ferment is usually a sticky process that uses part of the flour, part or all of the water, and part or all of the yeast of a total- or straight-dough formula. Highly liquid sponges of batter consistencies are mixed with a whip, spoon, or fork. Lower hydration, stiffer sponges are lightly mixed or kneaded just until the dough begins to develop. The sponge is allowed to rest and ferment for a period of time in an environment of a desired temperature and humidity. When the sponge's fermentation time has elapsed or it has reached a desired volumetric growth characteristic, the final dough's ingredients are added. The gluten is developed in the mixing or kneading process, and it may then be processed through further work and rest cycles before being proofed then baked.

The sum of the sponge and final dough's ingredients represents the total formula. (Note: The total formula could be conceived as equivalent to a straight-dough formula, with the separate sponge & dough formulas representing the additional process.) A generic 65% pre-fermented flour sponge-and-dough formula using bakers' percentages follows:

	Sponge %	&	(Final) Dough %	=	Total Formula (Note: Theartisan.net's presentation of sponge is known as Biga, and their separate Biga and final dough formulas have both been normalized so the flour of each equals 100%. This is also true of Michel Suas's example from Advanced Bread and Pastry. These formula presentations obscure the sponge-to-dough flour ratio unless ingredient weights of each are listed, or the ratio is otherwise indicated. Hamelman labels total formula instead overall formula, and specifies a related flour ratio. In Young and Cauvain's Table 2.3, the ratio is otherwise indicated, the 100% ingredient is the sum of the two flour percentages.)
Flour	65	+	35	=	100.00%
Water	40	+	25	=	65.00%
Sugar	0	+	6	=	6.00%
Milk solids	0	+	3	=	3.00%
Fat	0	+	3	=	3.00%
Yeast	2.4	+	0	=	2.40%
Salt	0	+	2.3	=	2.30%
adapted from Young and Cauvain's Table 2.3

The sponge's fermentation time depends on its temperature and that of the surrounding area, the ingredients used, and the percentage amount of yeast. It ferments in a humid environment at 74–78 °F (23–26 °C), where it may rise and expand to 4-5 times its original volume, when it falls it has reached 66-70% of its allotted time.

One significant decision the baker must make when designing such a formula, or adapting a direct or straight-dough formula or recipe, is to decide the sponge-to-dough flour ratio. While the relative amounts of ingredients used may vary, the method remains the same.

== Purpose ==
The sponge method is used for 3 different reasons: taste, texture and chemistry.

The flavour that is created is dependent on the ingredients used and the fermenting yeast. Just like sourdough, the longer the ferment, the greater the taste difference.

Sponge doughs were used before bread improvers were invented. Texture is partly a byproduct of the chemistry going on in the fermentation, which does several important things such as activating the different enzymes (protease and amylase) needed to leaven bread. Modern grain-harvesting practices have reduced the naturally occurring enzymes that grains had in former times, a result of no-longer-used grain-storage processes, so today small amounts of enzymes are routinely added to flour by manufacturers, often in the form of malted barley or sprouted grain.

Proteases, dependent on their time of action and concentration levels, soften the gluten in the dough, hydrolyzing peptide bonds, increasing dough extensibility which allows the protein matrix to stretch out as the mix expands, thus leading to increased baked volumes and better structure.

== Products ==
Many bread recipes call for a sponge method, especially traditional French breads. Some examples of breads that use the sponge method:

- Brioche
- Portuguese sweet bread
- Stollen

== See also ==
- Continuous-mixing process
- Biga
- Chorleywood bread process
