= Jeff Hertzberg =

American cookbook author and a physician

Jeff Hertzberg is an American cookbook author and a physician. With co-author Zoë François, he has created three cookbooks on baking homemade bread. The books teach a no-knead method of baking which uses dough that is stored in the refrigerator for up to two weeks, making it convenient for home cooks to bake fresh bread daily.

== First Book: Artisan Bread in Five Minutes a Day ==
Thomas Dunne Books editor Ruth Cavin bought the U.S. rights to Artisan Bread in Five Minutes a Day after hearing Hertzberg call in to National Public Radio's The Splendid Table on April 4, 2000. Thomas Dunne Books, a subsidiary of St. Martin's Press/Macmillan Publishers, has published all of their books. Artisan Bread in Five Minutes a Day was an instant success upon its publication in 2007, earning coverage on the Today Show, in the New York Times and the Chicago Tribune, as well as other publications.

== Subsequent Books ==
Hertzberg and François have written two follow-up books: Healthy Bread in Five Minutes a Day (2009) and Artisan Pizza and Flatbreads in Five Minutes a Day (2011). The authors provide online support for readers through their blog.

== Works ==
- Artisan Bread in Five Minutes a Day, St. Martin’s Press, 2007
- Healthy Bread in Five Minutes a Day, St. Martin’s Press, 2009
- Artisan Pizza and Flatbread in Five Minutes a Day, St. Martin’s Press, 2011
- The New Artisan Bread in Five Minutes a Day, St. Martin's Press, 2013
- Gluten-Free Artisan Bread in Five Minutes a Day, St. Martin’s Press, 2014
- The New Healthy Bread in Five Minutes a Day, St. Martin's Press 2016
- Holiday and Celebration Bread in Five Minutes a Day, St. Martin’s Press, 2018
