= Dough =

Paste used in cooking

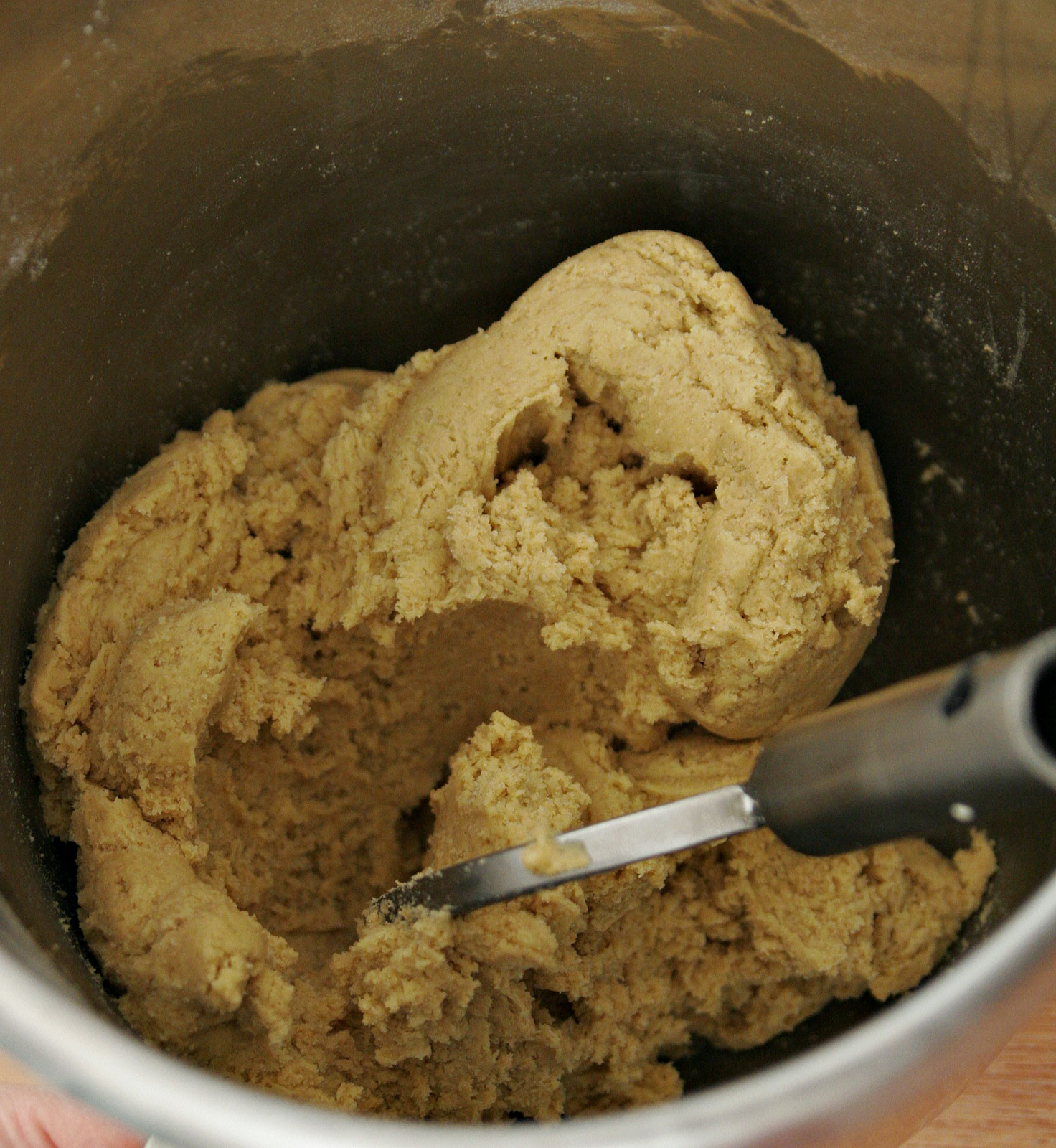
Freshly mixed dough in the bowl of a stand mixer

Dough is a malleable, sometimes elastic paste most commonly made from flour or meal. Dough is typically made by mixing flour with a small amount of water or other liquid, and sometimes includes yeast, other leavening agents, or ingredients such as fats or flavourings.

Making and shaping dough begins the preparation of a wide variety of foodstuffs, particularly breads and bread-based items, but also including biscuits, cakes, cookies, dumplings, flatbreads, noodles, pasta, pastry, pizza, scones and similar items.

== Types of dough ==
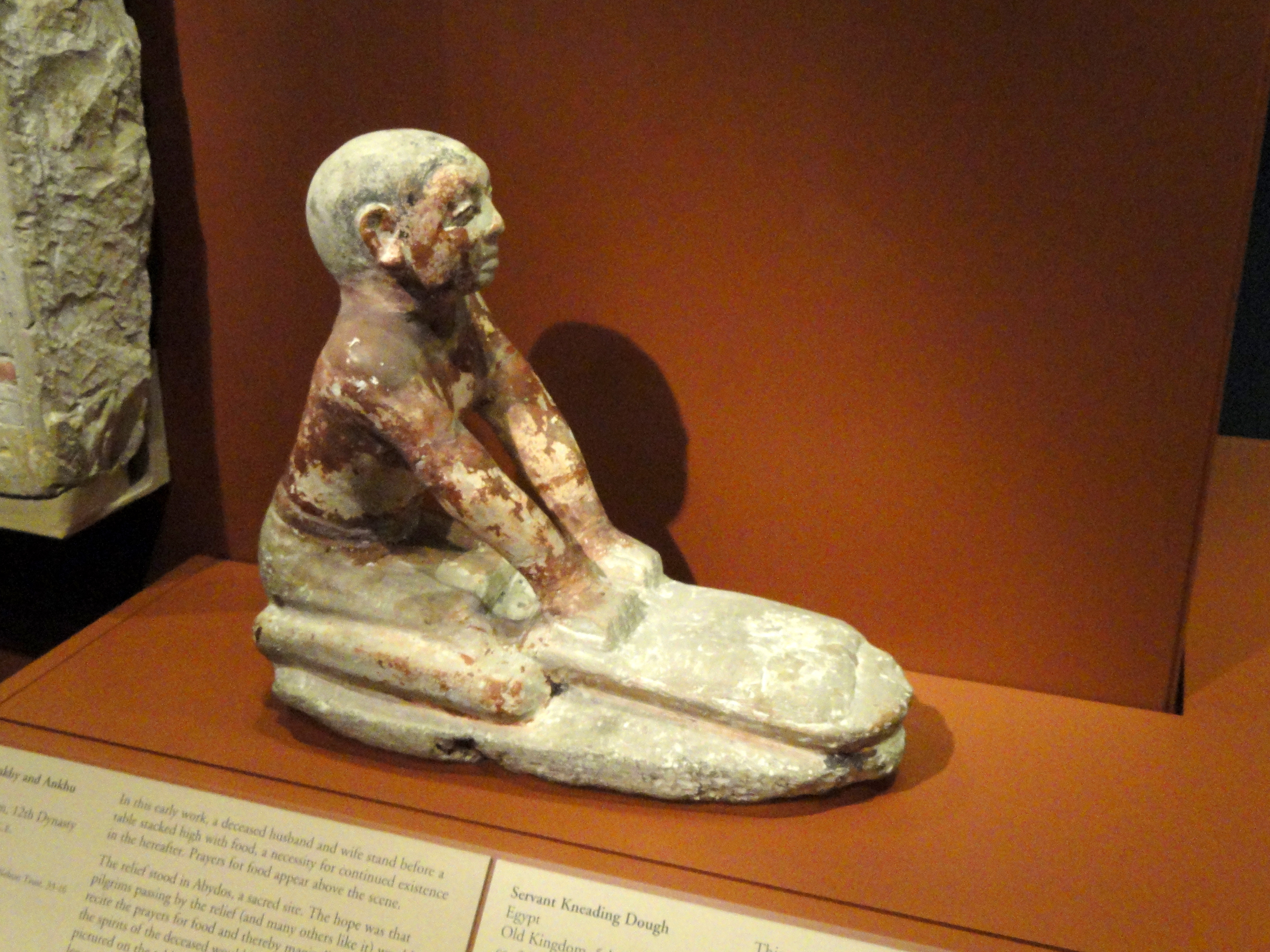
A statue of a servant kneading dough, from Egypt, Old Kingdom, 5th Dynasty, c. 2494–2345 BCE

There is no formal definition of what makes dough, though most doughs have viscoelastic properties.

Yeast-leavened doughs are used to make various types of bread, including bread rolls, loaves and some types of flatbread. Not all yeast doughs require kneading. High-hydration doughs like ciabatta and focaccia may be folded to develop gluten or not kneaded at all. Commercial bread dough may also include dough conditioners, which help make the dough and the final product more consistent.

The addition of milk, salt, fats, eggs, sugar or other ingredients will produce bread products of varying texture. Enriched doughs include Viennoiserie, which can be made in laminated form, which usually used to make croissant or un-laminated that is used to make brioche and king cake. Un-yeasted leavened dough (known as quick breads in the US and Canada) use leavening agents such as baking powder or baking soda, and include soda bread, scones and biscuits.

Unleavened bread is made not only from wheat but in many cultures has been made from locally available starchy ingredients like corn, oats and cassava since the earliest times.

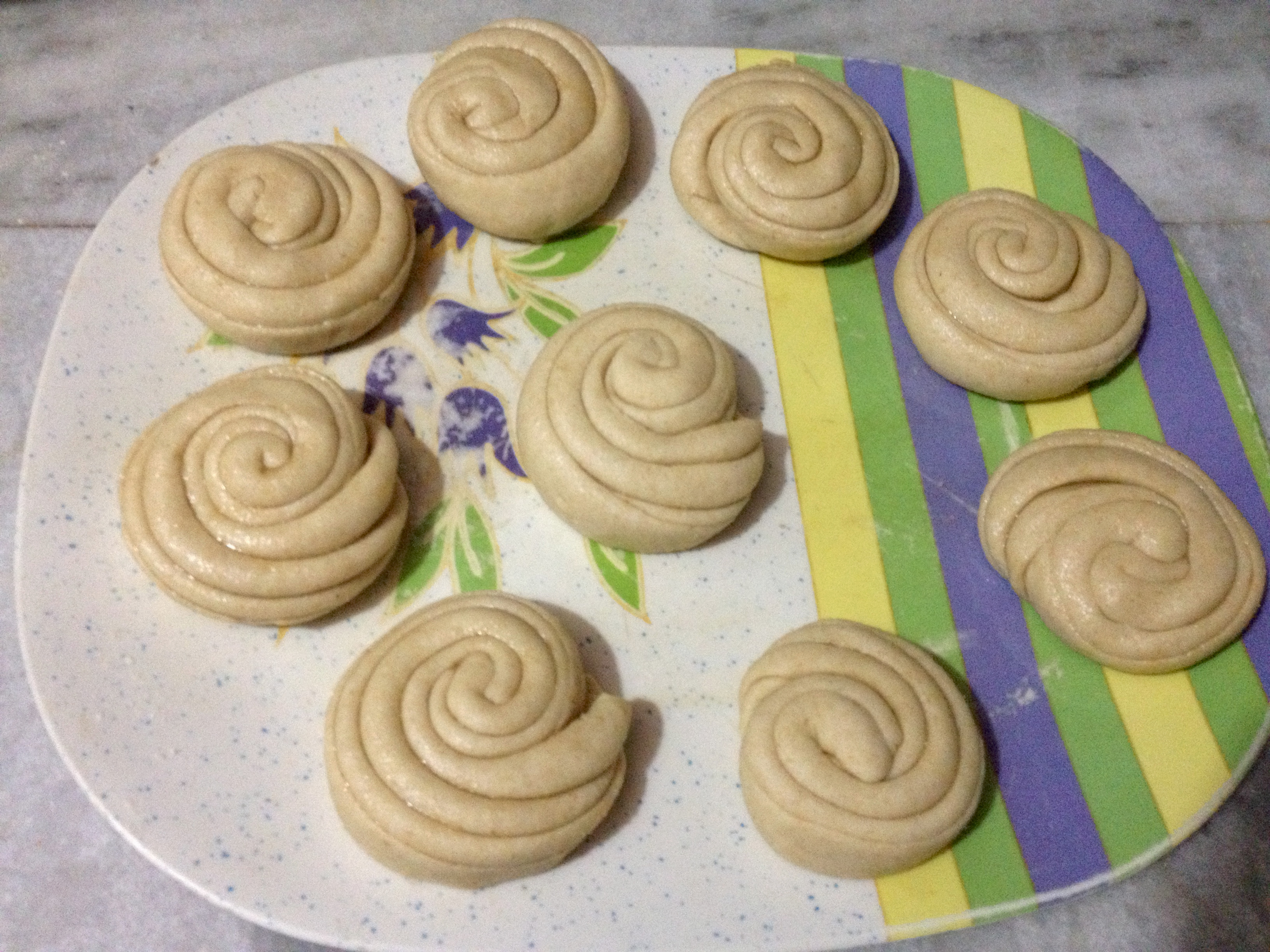
A laminated dough prepared to make a flaky South Asian flatbread known as paratha

Laminated dough such as flaky pastry and puff pastry are flour-based doughs folded over fat to create layers and rolled out. The folding and rolling process can be repeated to create very thin layers of dough separated by butter to create the puff pastry. There are many different techniques to create laminated doughs; some, like paratha, are relatively simple, while others, like mille-feuille, are more laborious. Most laminated doughs are leavened only by the steam created by the folding process.

Choux pastry is a steam-leavened dough used for some types of sweet pastries, notably cream puffs, eclairs, some homemade funnel cakes, tulumba and churros. Unlike most other pastry doughs, the ingredients for the dough are cooked on the stove top before the dough is baked until achieving the consistency of a thick paste. Choux means 'cabbage' in French. It is thought that the name comes from the shape of the cream puffs made with choux paste.

Gluten gives dough structure and texture. Gluten-free or low-gluten doughs may need additional considerations. Gluten-free doughs like rice noodles and Japanese harusame noodles depend on the gelatinization of starch for structure.

Doughs with higher fat content develop less gluten and are, therefore, generally less elastic than most bread doughs. They tend to become tough when they are kneaded. These doughs are often called "short" by bakers. Examples include many cookie/biscuit and pastries such as shortcrust pastry.

Some dumpling and pasta doughs are similar enough that experts have difficulty distinguishing them, although dumpling is a very general category that overlaps with others like yeasted breads and batter biscuits. Varying the ratio of liquid and flour in a basic pasta dough may create a softer dough like that used for the German soup noodle spaetzle. Eggs are a very common addition to make the dough moist and easier to roll out. The dough can be filled or shaped various ways and boiled, baked, steamed or fried.

Sometimes meringue is considered a dough. The English recipe for "Satin Biscuit" dates to 1677, and earlier recipes are known by different names. Some included flour like a 1604 recipe for "white bisket bread".

== Techniques ==
Techniques used in dough production depend on the type of dough and final product.

For yeast-based and sponge (such as sourdough) breads, a common production technique is the dough is mixed, kneaded, and then left to rise. Many bread doughs call for a second stage, where the dough is kneaded again, shaped into the final form, and left to rise a final time (or proofed) before baking. Kneading is the process of working a dough to produce a smooth, elastic dough by developing gluten. This process is both temperature and time-dependent; temperatures that are either too hot or too cold will cause the yeast to not develop, and rising times that are either too short or too long will affect the final product.

For some bread doughs, an autolyse—a rest of flour and water before final mixing—can reduce subsequent mixing time and increase dough extensibility.

Pasta is typically made from a dry dough that is kneaded and shaped, either through extrusion, rolling out in a pasta machine, or stretched or shaped by hand (as for gnocchi or dumplings). Pasta may be cooked directly after production (so-called "fresh pasta") or dried, which renders it shelf-stable.

Doughs for biscuits and many flatbreads which are not leavened with yeast are typically mixed but not kneaded or left to rise; these doughs are shaped and cooked directly after mixing.

While breads and other products made from doughs are often baked, some types of dough-based foods are cooked over direct heat, such as tortillas, which are cooked directly on a griddle. Fried dough foods are also common in many cultures.

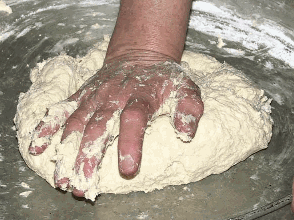
Dough being kneaded

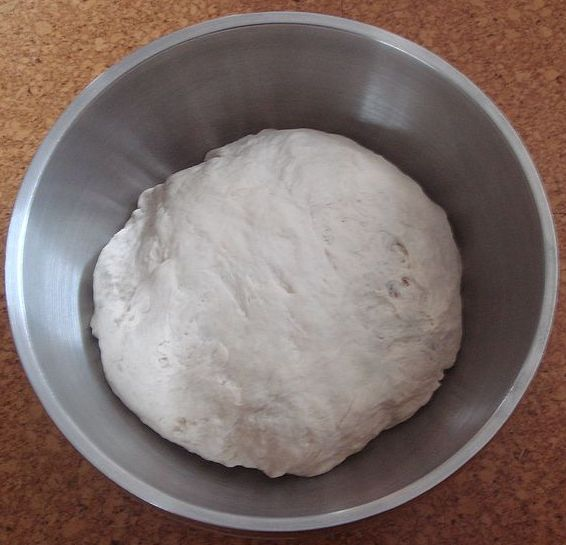
Yeast bread dough after kneading, before rising

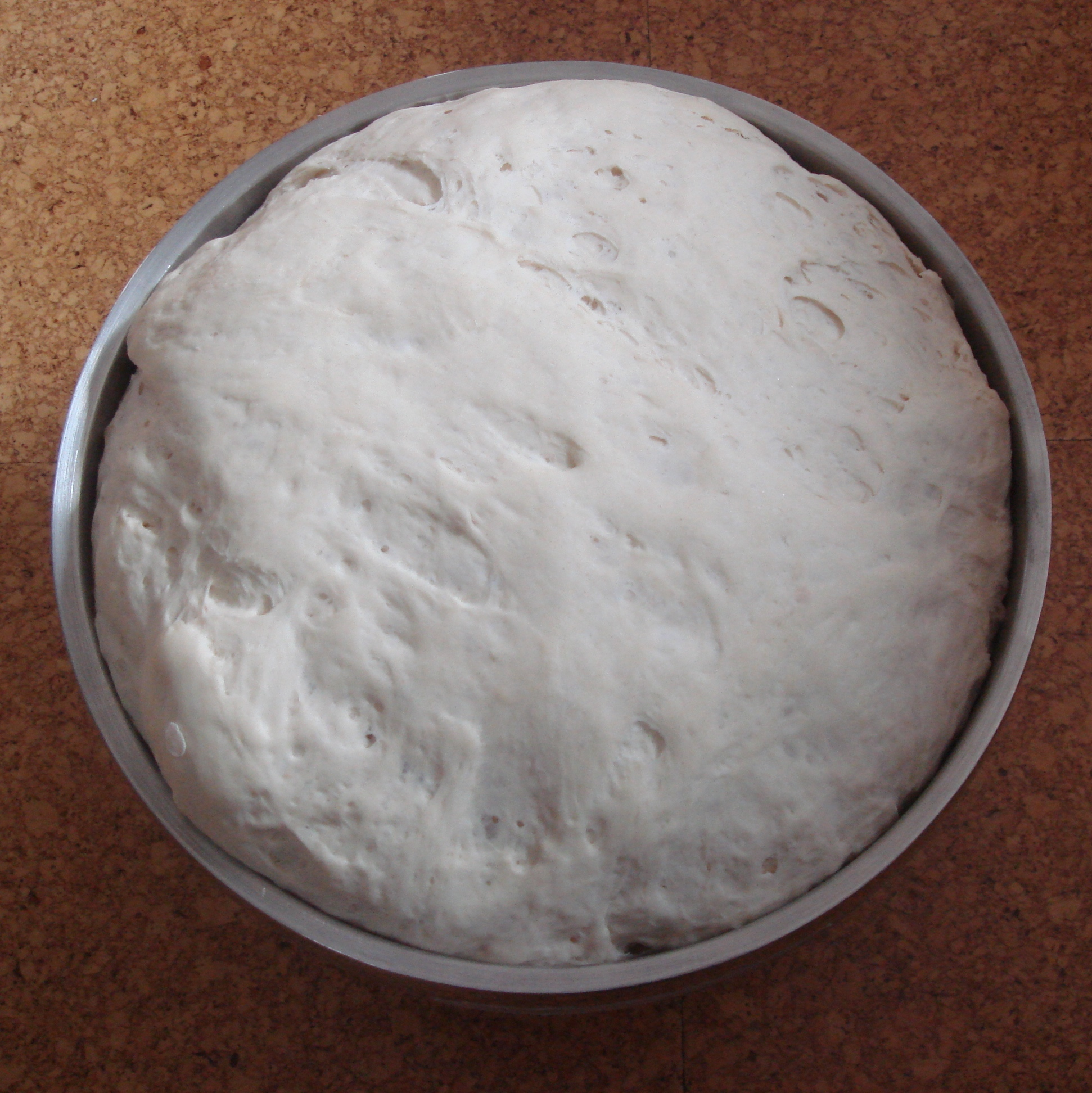
Yeast bread dough after rising (proofing), for 40 minutes

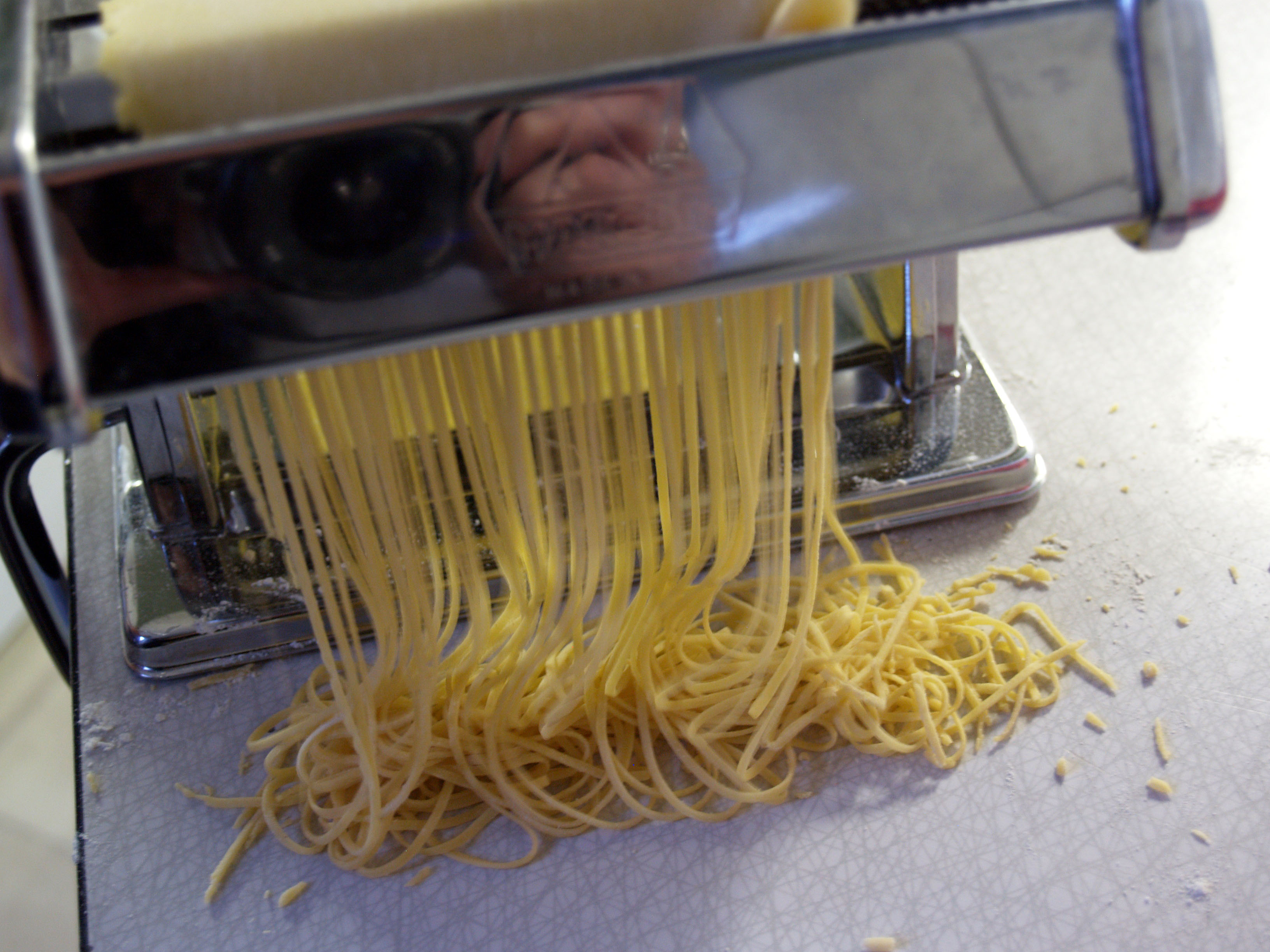
Dough being cut into noodles with a pasta machine

== See also ==
- Alveograph, a device measuring the extensibility of dough
- Baking
- Bread trough
- Dough blender
- Dough scraper
- Doughboy (disambiguation)
- Farinograph – a tool that measures specific properties of flour
- Frozen dough
- List of breads
- List of fried dough foods
- List of pasta
- List of pastries
- Parchment paper
- Proofing (baking technique)
- Roller docker
- Royal icing
- Straight dough
- Stuffing
