= Proofing (baking technique) =

Process by which a yeast-leavened dough rises

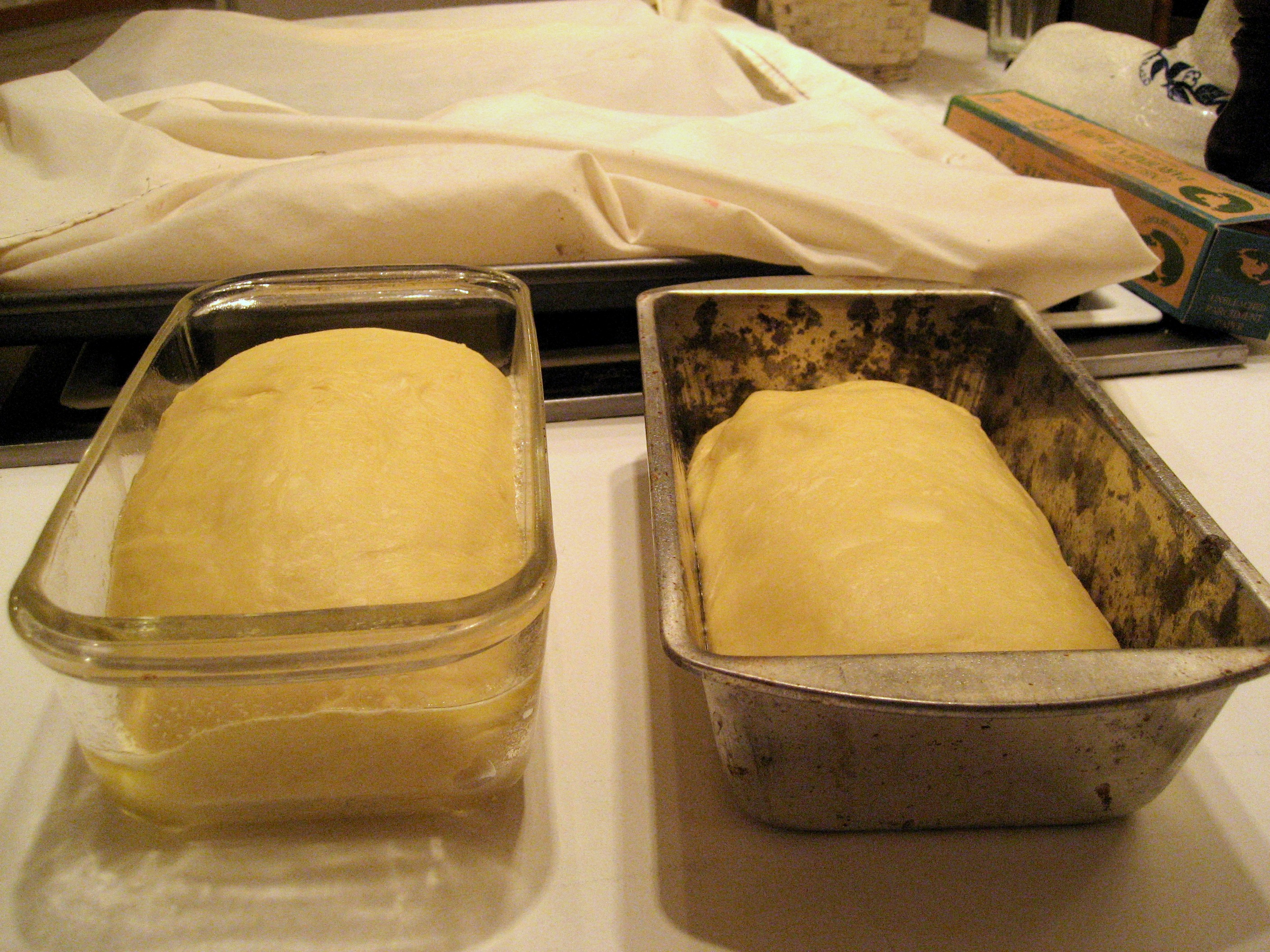
Challah proofing in loaf pans. Bread covered with linen proofing cloth in the background.

Proofing (North American) or proving (British and Australasia) is a step in the preparation of yeast bread and other baked goods in which the dough is allowed to rest and rise a final time before baking. During this rest period, yeast ferments the dough and produces gases, thereby leavening the dough.

In contrast, proofing or blooming yeast (as opposed to proofing the dough) may refer to the process of first suspending yeast in warm water, a necessary hydration step when baking with active dry yeast. (Note: Instant dry yeast may be placed directly into flour without hydrating first.) Proofing can also refer to the process of testing the viability of dry yeast by suspending it in warm water with carbohydrates (sugars). If the yeast is still alive, it will feed on the sugar and produce a visible layer of foam on the surface of the water mixture.

Fermentation rest periods are not always explicitly named, and can appear in recipes as "Allow dough to rise." When they are named, terms include "bulk fermentation", "first rise", "second rise", "final proof" and "shaped proof".

== Dough processes ==
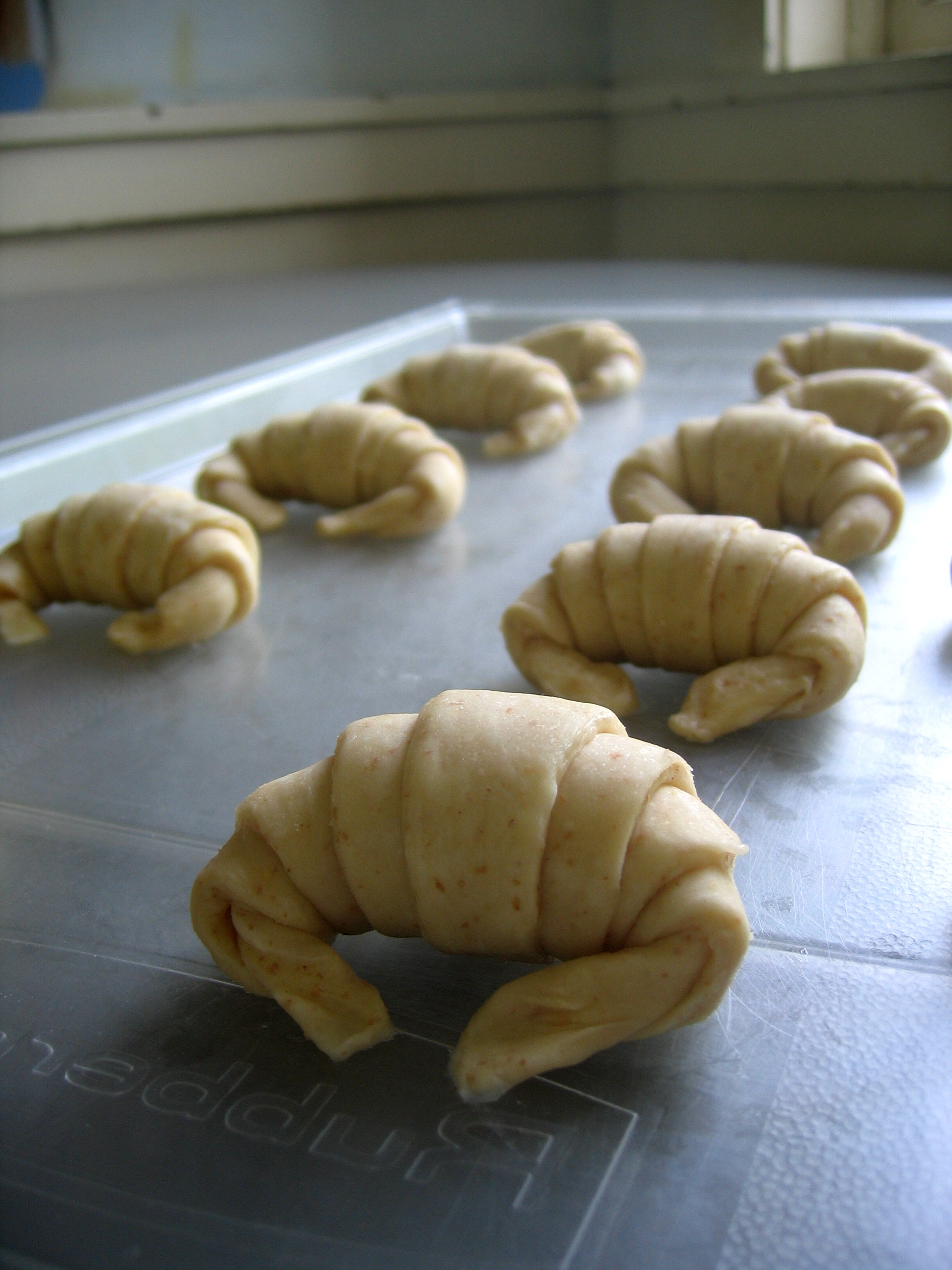
Croissants proofing on plastic tray

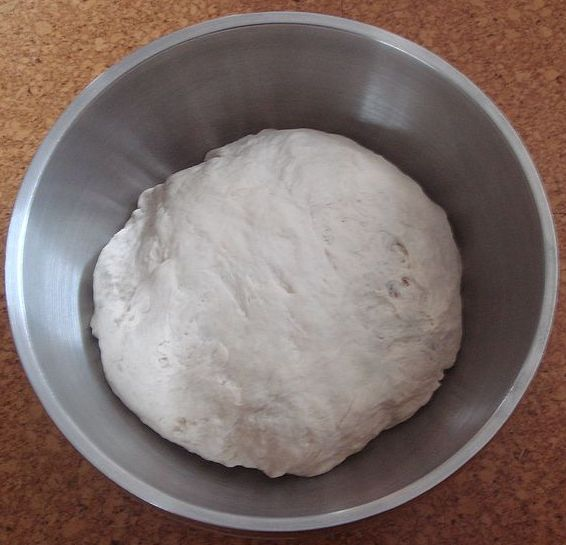
Dough, resting and rising in bulk fermentation

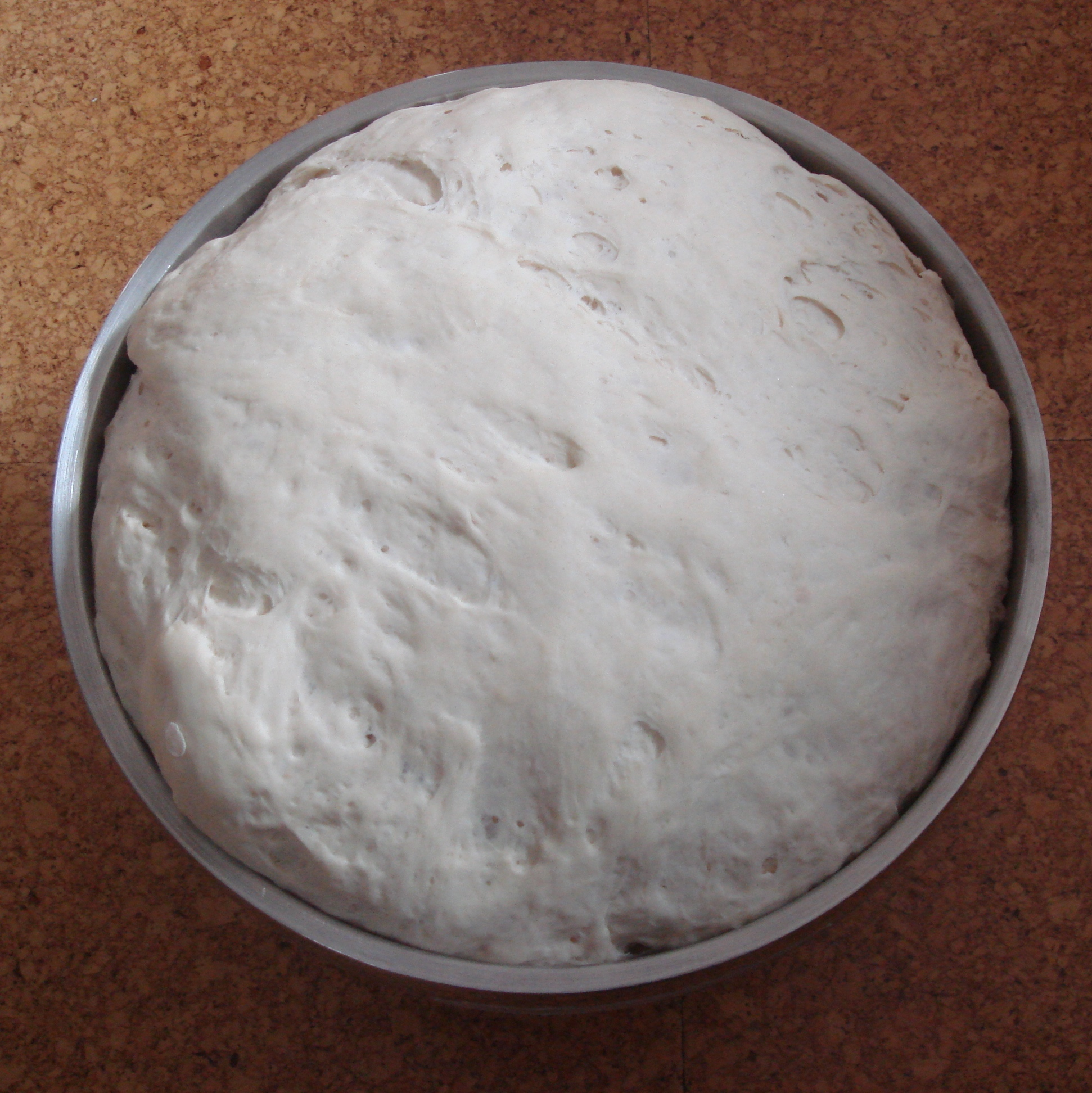
40 minutes later

The process of making yeast-leavened bread involves a series of alternating work and rest periods. Work periods occur when the dough is manipulated by the baker. Some work periods are called mixing, kneading, and folding, as well as division, shaping, and panning. Work periods are typically followed by rest periods, which occur when dough is allowed to sit undisturbed. Particular rest periods include, but are not limited to, autolyse, bulk fermentation and proofing. Proofing, also sometimes called final fermentation, is the specific term for allowing dough to rise after it has been shaped and before it is baked.

Some breads begin mixing with an autolyse. This refers to a period of rest after the initial mixing of flour and water, a rest period that occurs sequentially before the addition of yeast, salt and other ingredients. This rest period allows for better absorption of water and helps the gluten and starches to align. The autolyse is credited to Raymond Calvel, who recommended it as a way to reduce kneading time and thereby improve the flavor and color of bread.

'Proofing the yeast' is a hydration process that occurs when dry yeast is mixed with warm water and allowed to rest for a short time. The minimum weight of water required may be calculated: yeast weight x 4 = water weight.

Yeast viability can be tested by mixing yeast in warm water and sugar, and following a short rest period during which the cells first accommodate to the environment and then begin to grow, a layer of foam is developed by the action of the yeast, a sign of primary fermentation and live yeast. Typically 60 ml (1/4 cup) water at 40–45 °C (105–115 °F) and 2 g (1/2 teaspoon) of sugar are used, or expressed differently, a sugar weight of about 3.5% of the water's weight. While this sugar may be sucrose or table sugar, instead it may be glucose or maltose.

Fermentation typically begins when viable baker's yeast or a starter culture is added to flour and water. Enzymes in the flour and yeast create sugars, which are consumed by the yeast, which in turn produce carbon dioxide and alcohol. Specifically, the grain enzyme diastase begins to convert starch in the grain to maltose. The baker's yeast enzyme maltase converts maltose into glucose, invertase converts any added sucrose to glucose and fructose, and zymase converts glucose and fructose to carbon dioxide gas which makes the dough rise, and alcohol which gives the baked bread flavor. Sourdough starters also produce lactic and acetic acids, further contributing to flavor. When the yeast cells die, they release high quantities of a protease which snip protein strands, and in large die-offs result in soft, sticky dough, less baked volume, and a coarse crumb, but in smaller die offs, increase dough extensibility and baked volume.

Different bread varieties will have different process requirements. These are generally classified as either straight or sponge dough processes. Straight doughs will require only a single mixing period. During bulk fermentation straight-dough recipes may instruct a baker to "punch down" or "deflate" the dough, while artisan bakers will use terms like "stretching", "folding", and "degassing", meaning to expel gas from the carbon dioxide bubbles that have formed. Sponge doughs will need multiple mixing periods.

Overproofing occurs when a fermenting dough has rested too long. Its bubbles have grown so large that they have popped and tunneled, and dough baked at this point would result in a bread with poor structure. Length of rest periods, including proofing, can be determined by time at specific temperatures or by characteristics. Often the "poke method" is used to determine if a dough has risen long enough. If the dough, when poked, springs back immediately it is underproofed and needs more time. Some breads are considered fully proofed if the indent left by the poke springs back slowly, while others are considered fully proofed when the indent remains and does not spring back.

A bread that is properly proofed will balance gas production with the ability of the bread's gluten structure to contain it, and will exhibit good oven spring when baked. A bread that is under- or overproofed will have less oven spring and be denser. An overproofed bread may even collapse in the oven as the volume of gas produced by the yeast can no longer be contained by the gluten structure.

Retarding may occur at any time during fermentation and is accomplished by placing the dough into a dough retarder, refrigerator, or other cold environment to slow the activity of the yeast. The retarding stage is often used in sourdough bread recipes to allow the bread to develop its characteristic flavor. A cold fermentation stage is sometimes used to develop flavor in other artisan breads, with a part of the dough ("pre-ferment") before the final mixing, with the entire dough during bulk fermentation, or in the final fermentation stages after shaping.

== Proofing equipment ==
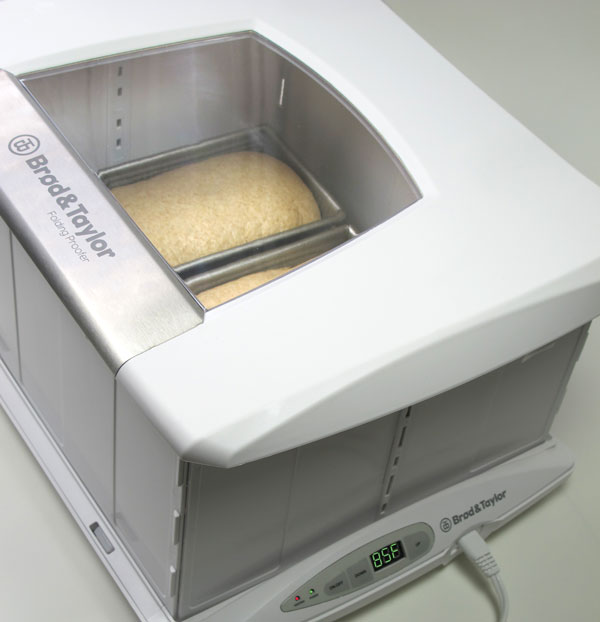
Bread proofer for home use

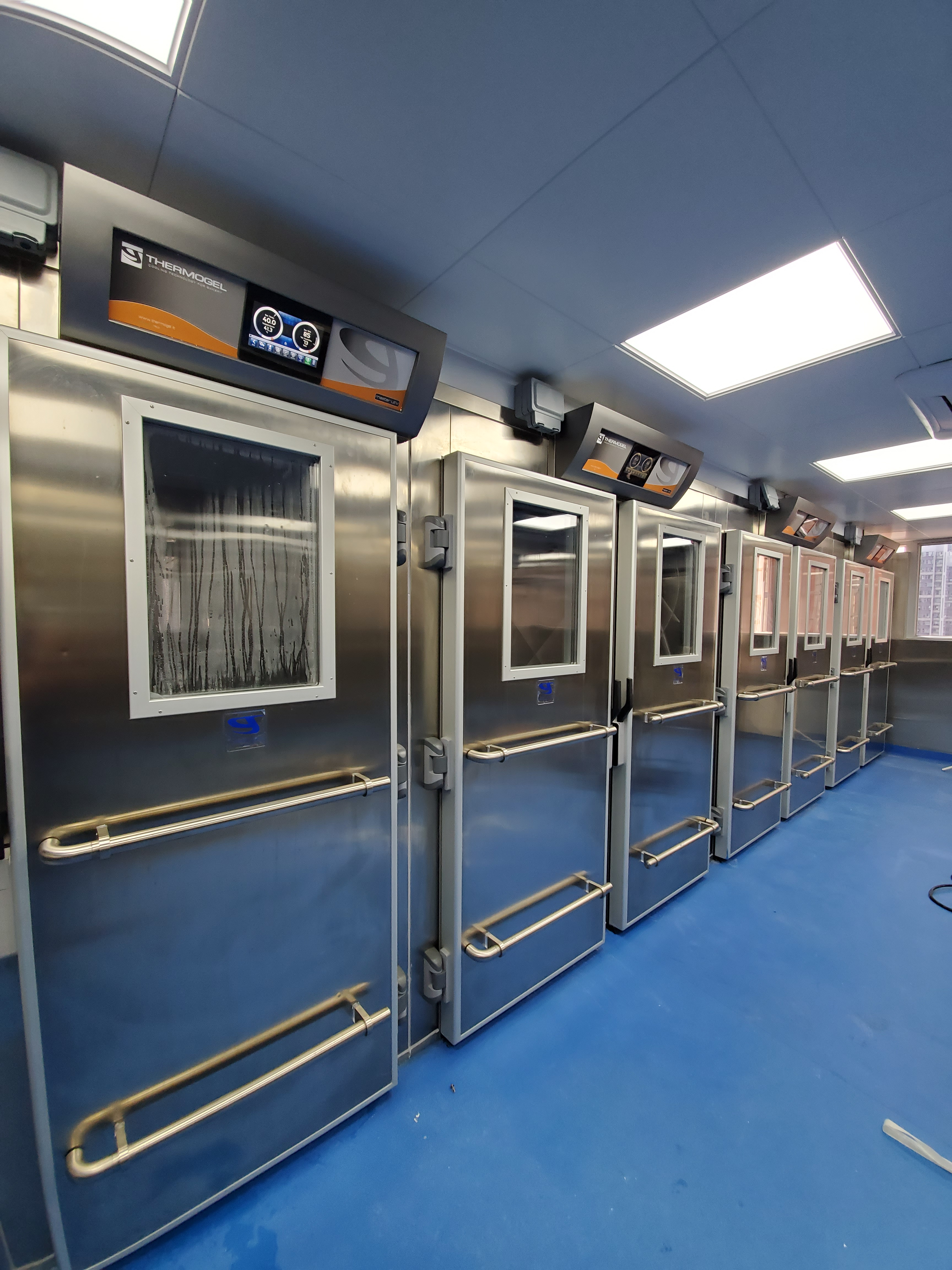
Commercial dough proofer

To ensure consistent results and maintain baking schedules, specialized tools are used to manipulate the speed and qualities of fermentation.

A dough proofer is a warming chamber used in baking that encourages fermentation of dough by yeast through warm temperatures and controlled humidity. It is also called a proofing box, proofing oven, or proofing cabinet. The warm temperatures increase the activity of the yeast, resulting in increased carbon dioxide production and a higher, faster rise. Dough is typically allowed to rise in the proofer before baking, but can also be used for the first rise, or bulk fermentation. Desired proofer temperatures can range from 20 to 45 °C (70 to 115 °F); cooler temperatures are achieved in a dough retarder, see below. Commercial bakers typically use large, temperature- and humidity-controlled proofers, whereas home bakers employ a variety of methods to create a warm, humid environment for dough rising. Examples include a home oven with a bowl of water and the pilot light on, a box with a bowl of hot water in it (the water is replaced periodically to maintain warmth), or a counter top proofer (an electric appliance) designed for home use.

A dough retarder is a refrigerator used to control the fermentation of yeast when proofing dough. Lowering the temperature of the dough produces a slower, longer rise with more varied fermentation products, resulting in more complex flavors. In sourdough bread-making, cold decreases the activity of wild yeast relative to the Lactobacilli, which produce flavoring products such as lactic acid and acetic acid. Sourdough that is retarded before baking can result in a more sour loaf. To prevent the dough from drying, air flow in the dough retarder is kept to a minimum. Home bakers may use cloth or other cover for dough that is kept for a longer period in the refrigerator. Commercial bakers often retard dough at approximately 10 °C (50 °F), while home bakers typically use refrigerators set at about 4 °C (40 °F) or below.

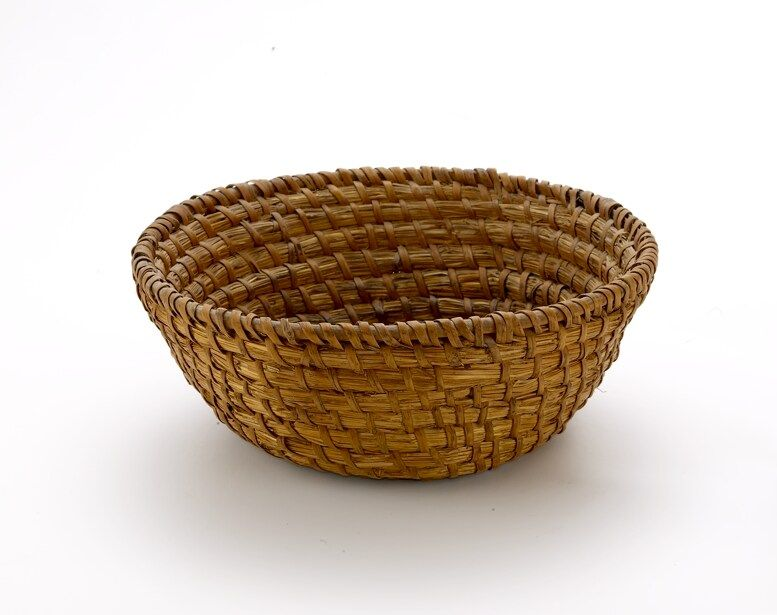
Wicker Banneton (rye straw proofing basket)

A banneton is a type of basket used to provide structure for shaped loaves of bread during proofing. Banneton baskets are also known as brotform or proofing baskets. It is normally used for doughs that are too soft or wet to maintain their shape while rising. Proofing baskets are distinct from loaf pans in that the bread is normally removed from these baskets before baking. Conventionally, these baskets are made out of rattan, but some modern proofing baskets are made out of cane, spruce pulp, terracotta, or polypropylene. A banneton will sometimes have a cloth liner, generally made of linen, to prevent dough from sticking to the sides of the basket. Bannetons become more non-stick with use as a small amount of flour accumulates in them. These baskets are used both to provide the loaf with shape and to wick moisture from the crust. Bannetons come in round or oblong shapes.

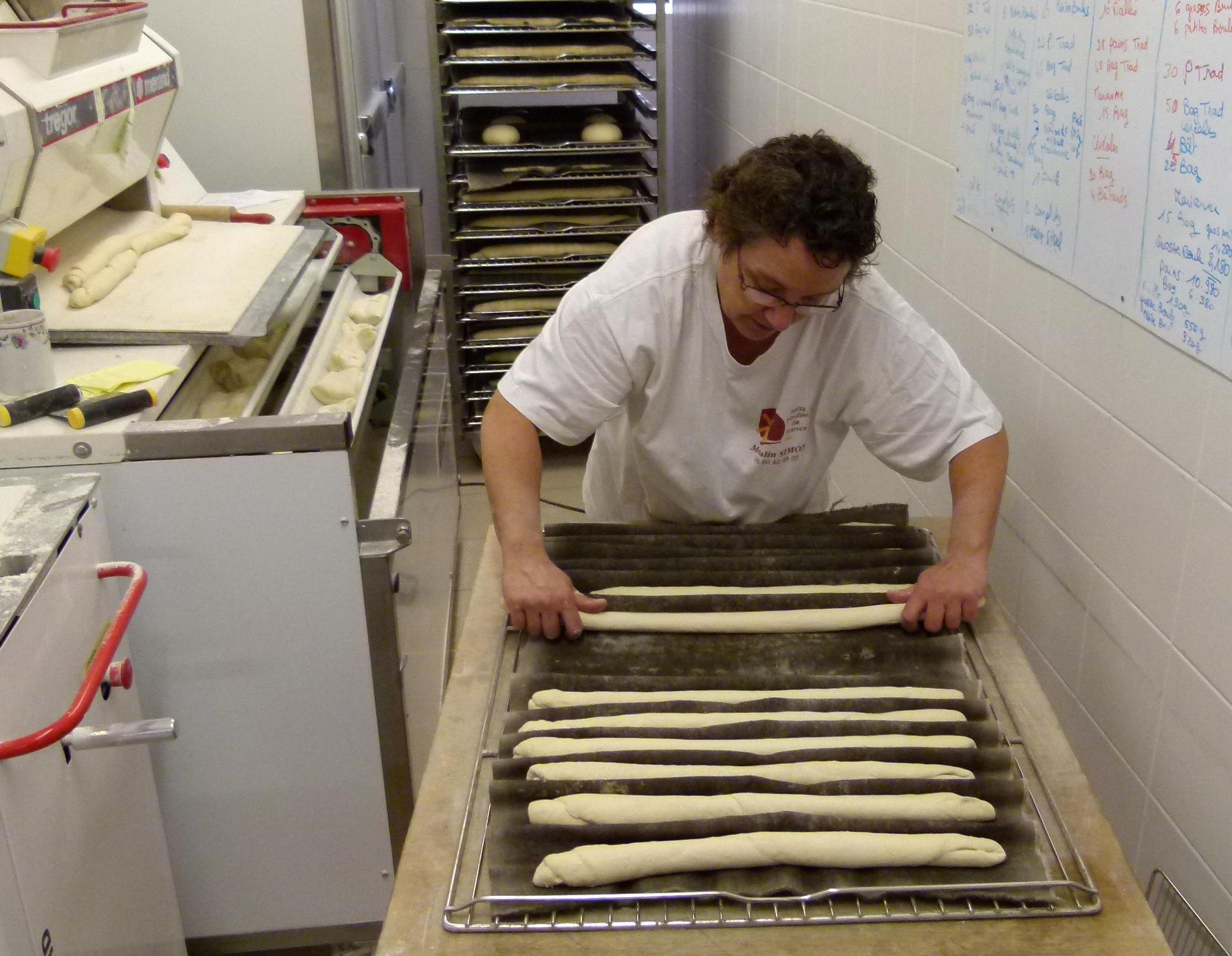
Couche in use

Alternatively, a couche (pronounced koosh), bakery couche, or proofing cloth, can be used in proofing dough. Used for longer loaves, such as baguettes, couches are typically made of linen, which is dusted lightly with flour to create a less-sticky surface. Shaped doughs are then laid on top of it and folds are placed to separate and support them while proofing.

Breads such as sandwich loaves and brioche are normally proofed in the bread pan in which they will be baked.

== See also ==
- Bread
- Fermentation
- Lame (kitchen tool)
- Roller docker
