= Biga (bread baking) =

Type of pre-fermentation used in Italian baking

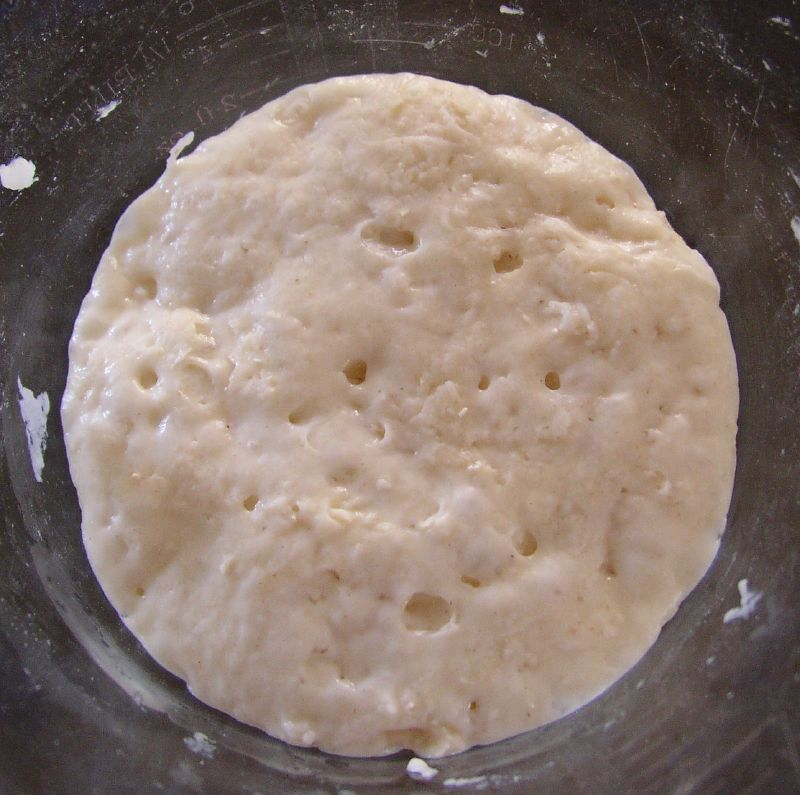
A bowl of biga

Biga is a type of pre-fermentation used in Italian baking. Many popular Italian breads, including ciabatta, are made using a biga. Using a biga adds complexity to the bread's flavor and is often used in breads that need a light, open texture with holes. Apart from adding to flavor and texture, a biga also helps to preserve bread by making it less perishable.

Biga techniques were developed after the advent of baker's yeast as bakers in Italy moved away from the use of sourdough and needed to recover some of the flavor that was given up in this move.

For this leavening the term "poolish" is sometimes used, which derives from the mispronunciation of the English "Polish" or the German "polnisch". It probably derives from the fact that the biga was known in Poland, and was learned by Austro-Hungarian bakers thanks to the Poles; from there it arrived in England.

== See also ==
- Pre-ferment
