= Raymond Calvel =

French food scientist

Raymond Calvel (1913 – 30 August 2005) was a bread expert and professor of baking at ENSMIC in Paris, France. Calvel has been credited with creating a revival of French-style breadmaking, as well as developing an extensive body of research on improving breadmaking technique, including studies of the differences between European and American wheat flour and the development of the autolyse, a hydration rest early in the mixing and kneading process designed to relax gluten in the dough and simplify the kneading process, thereby rendering the dough more extensible and easier to shape.

He was Julia Child and Simone Beck's teacher for the bread chapter of Mastering the Art of French Cooking Volume 2, as well as an advisor to the Bread Bakers Guild of America during its founding and early competitive efforts in the early 1990s. Calvel also wrote the book Le goût du pain (translated into English in 2001 as The Taste of Bread) as a summation of his work.

== See also ==
- Proofing
