= Bread pan =

Kitchen utensil

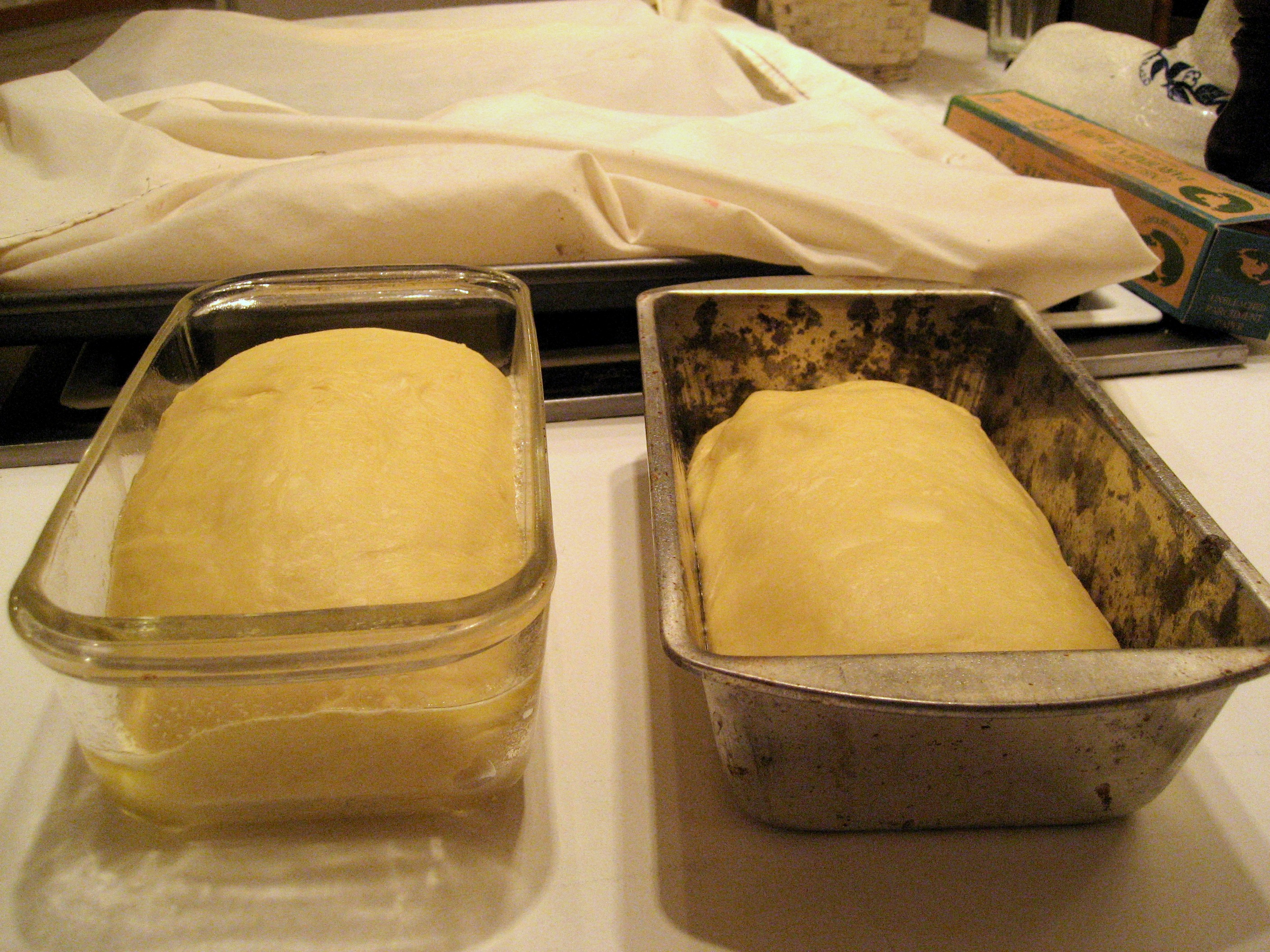
Challah dough proofing in glass and metal bread pans

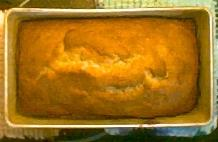
A loaf of banana bread sitting in a loaf pan

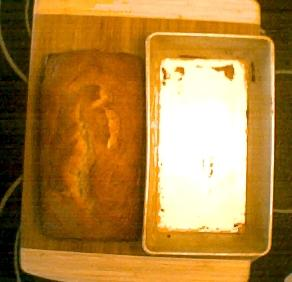
The same loaf of banana bread removed from the pan. Notice how it holds its shape.

A bread pan, also called a loaf pan, is a kitchen utensil in the form of a container in which bread is baked. Its function is to shape bread while it is rising during baking. While the dough proves and bakes, a bread pan restricts how the dough expands, influencing the shape of the loaf and the internal texture of the crumb. Bread pans also affect heat transfer and how moisture escapes the dough during baking, which impacts how the crust forms on the bottom and side of the loaf.

Bread pans are referenced as early as 1829 in The Frugal Housewife, with recipes for both brown bread and loaf cake directing readers to use a bread pan for baking.

== Materials and shapes ==
The bread pan is made from a conductive material such as metal which might be treated with a non-stick coating. It can also be made of heat-resistant glass, ceramic, or a special type of paper that sticks to the dough but is easily removed, once cooked.

Bread pans are found in a variety of designs and sizes providing the baker with different possibilities. The most common shape of the bread pan is the loaf, or narrow rectangle, a convenient form that enables uniform slicing. While rectangles are common shapes for bread pans, bakers can also purchase specialty shaped pans. In the late 19th century, U.S. bakers could buy both rectangular pans as well as pans that produced circular, square, and cylindrical loaves of bread. Sizes for bread pans varied in the United States in the 20th century, with early records referencing 3 by 8 by 3.5 inches for a bread pan and mid-century records mentioning bread pans ranging in size from 8.5 by 4.5 by 2.5 inches to 10 by 5 by 3 inches.

== Types ==
Types of bread typically baked in bread pans include sandwich breads, brioche, challah, and raisin bread.

== See also ==
- Cake pan
- List of cooking vessels
- Proofing (baking technique)
- Pullman loaf, type of square slicing bread, made with a lidded bread pan
