= Roller docker =

Food preparation utensil

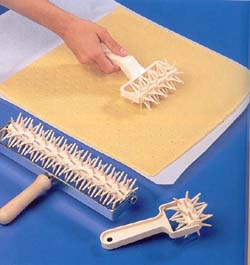
Roller dockers

A roller docker, rolling docker, dough docker, roto-fork, or simply docker is a food preparation utensil which resembles either a small, spiked rolling pin, or a small rotary tiller. It is used to pierce bread dough, cracker dough, pizza dough or pastry dough to prevent over rising or blistering. This specialized tool is more commonly found in professional bakeries than in homes that only do light or occasional baking.

Roller dockers come in a variety of materials, including nylon, plastic, and steel.

== Gallery ==
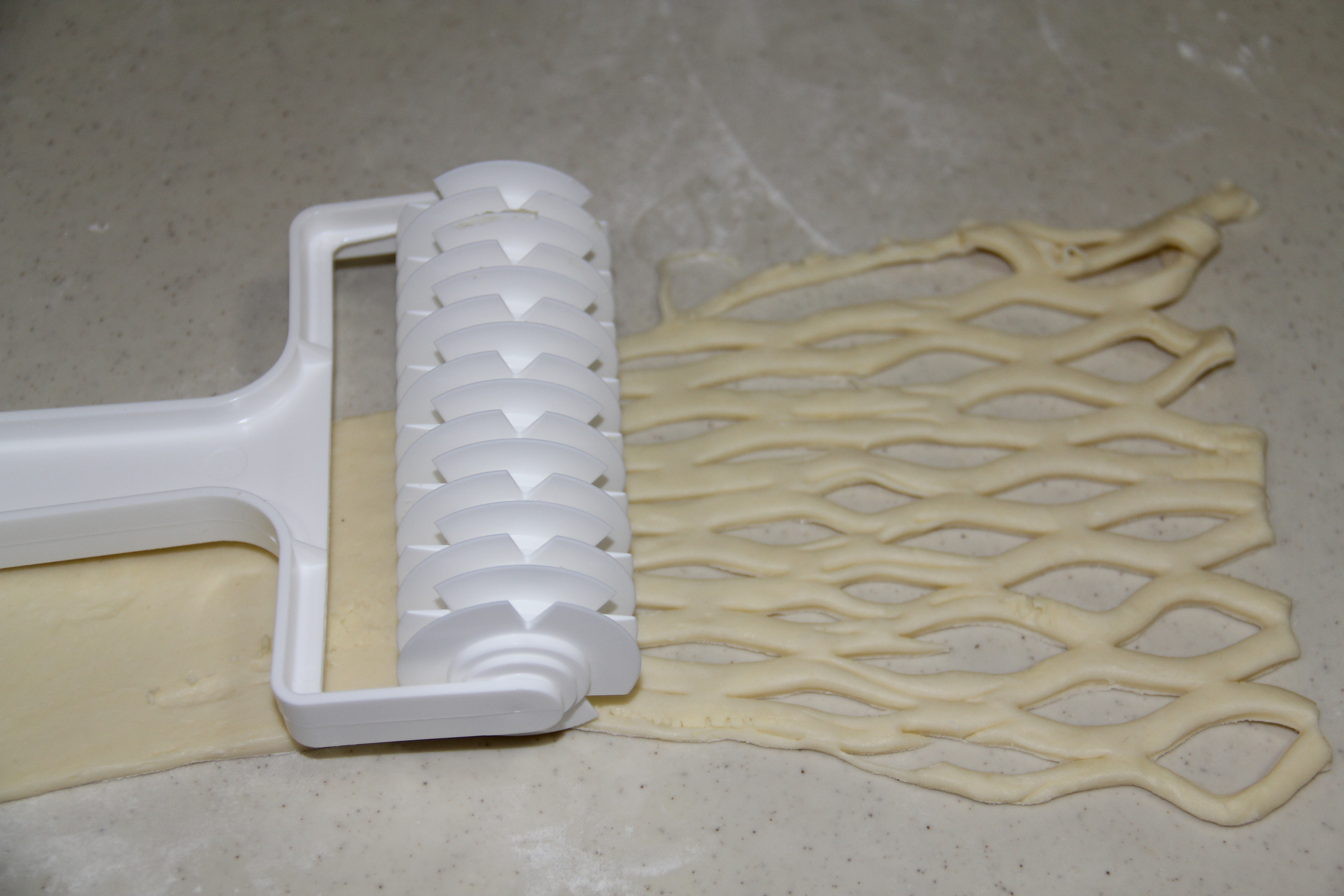
Lattice Pastry Roller. used in making pies.

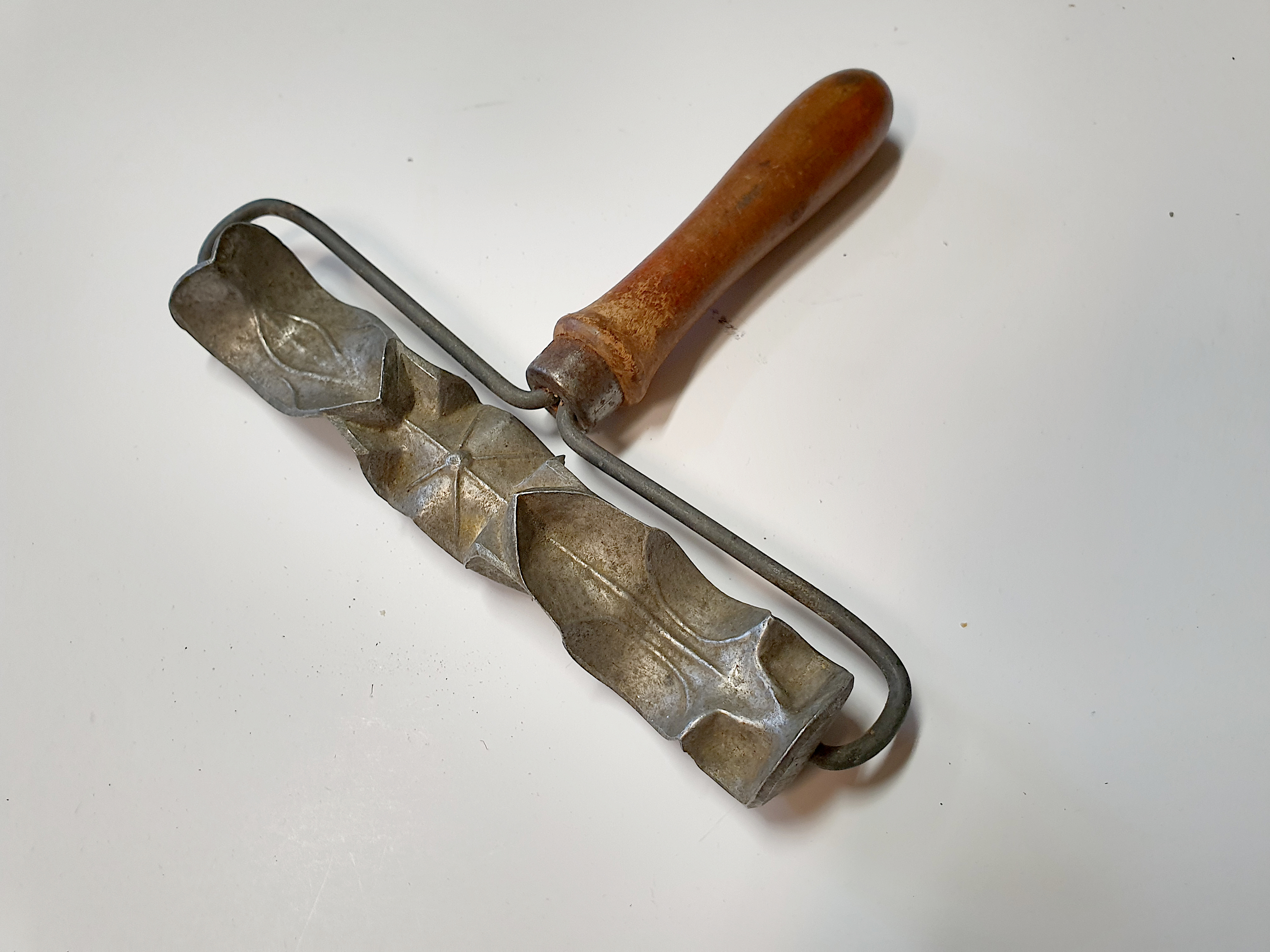
Vintage textured rolling pin

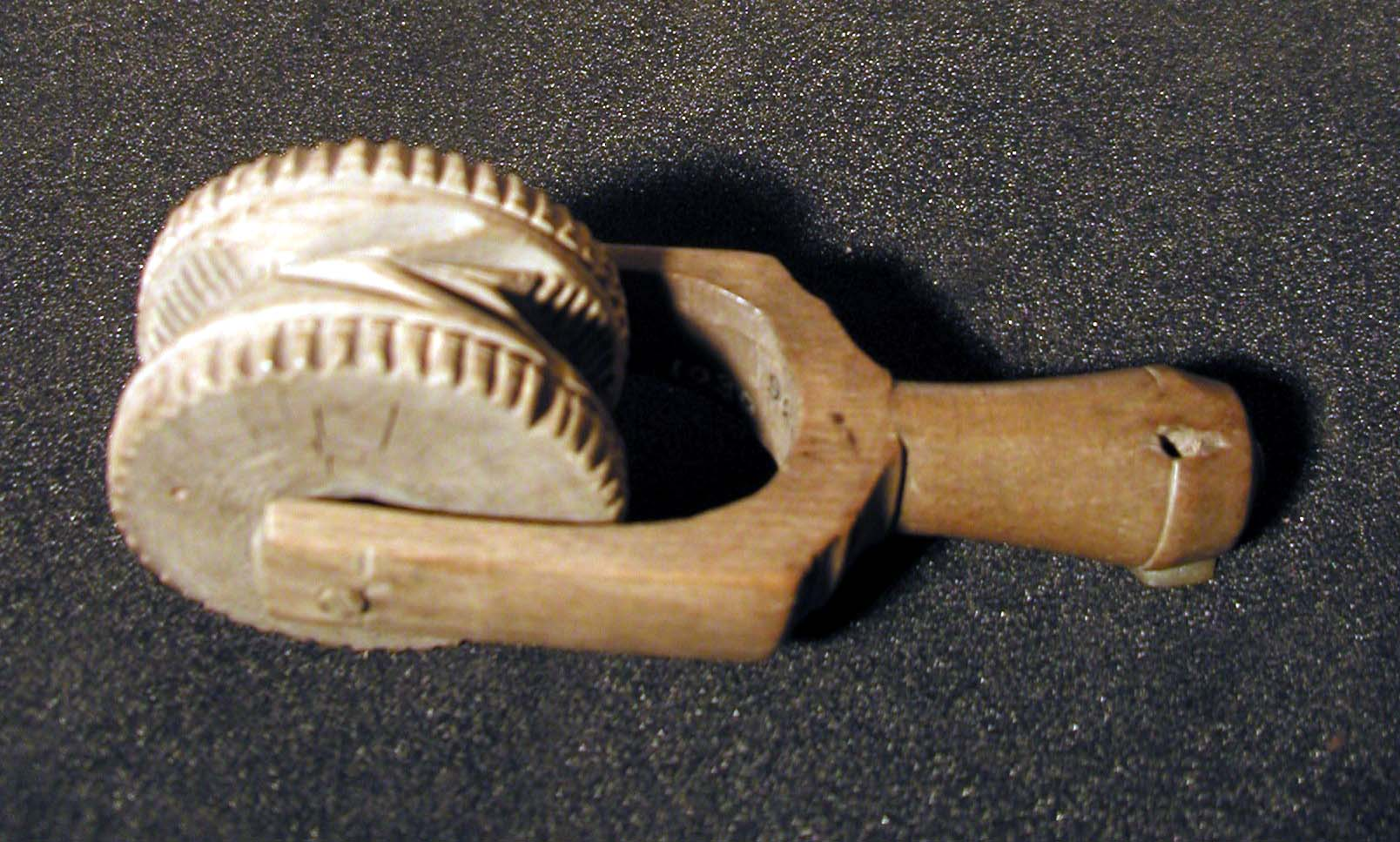
Butter printer

== See also ==
- Baking
- Peel (tool)
- Proofing (baking technique)
