= Bakery =

Type of business that sells baked goods

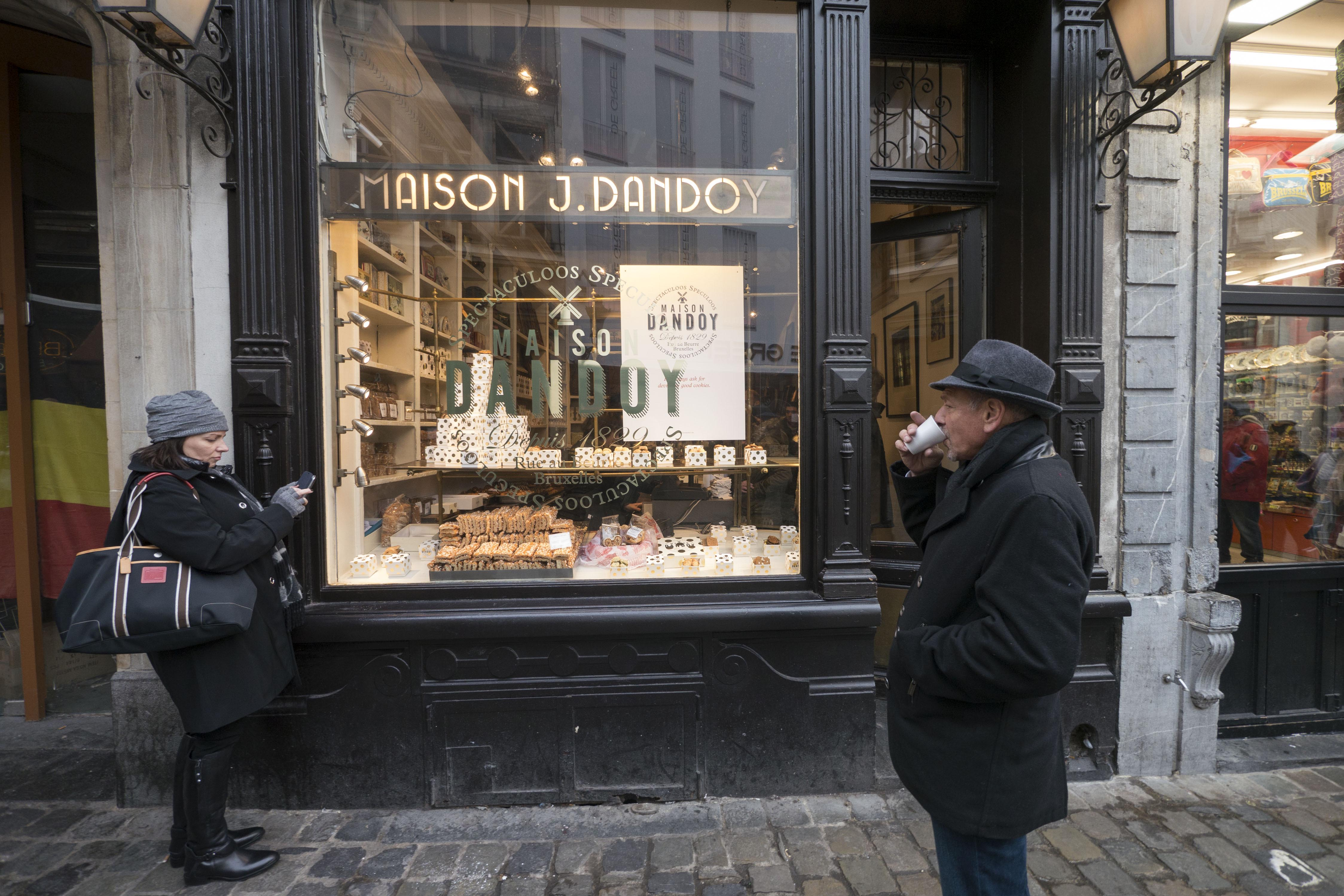
The exterior of a bakery in Brussels.

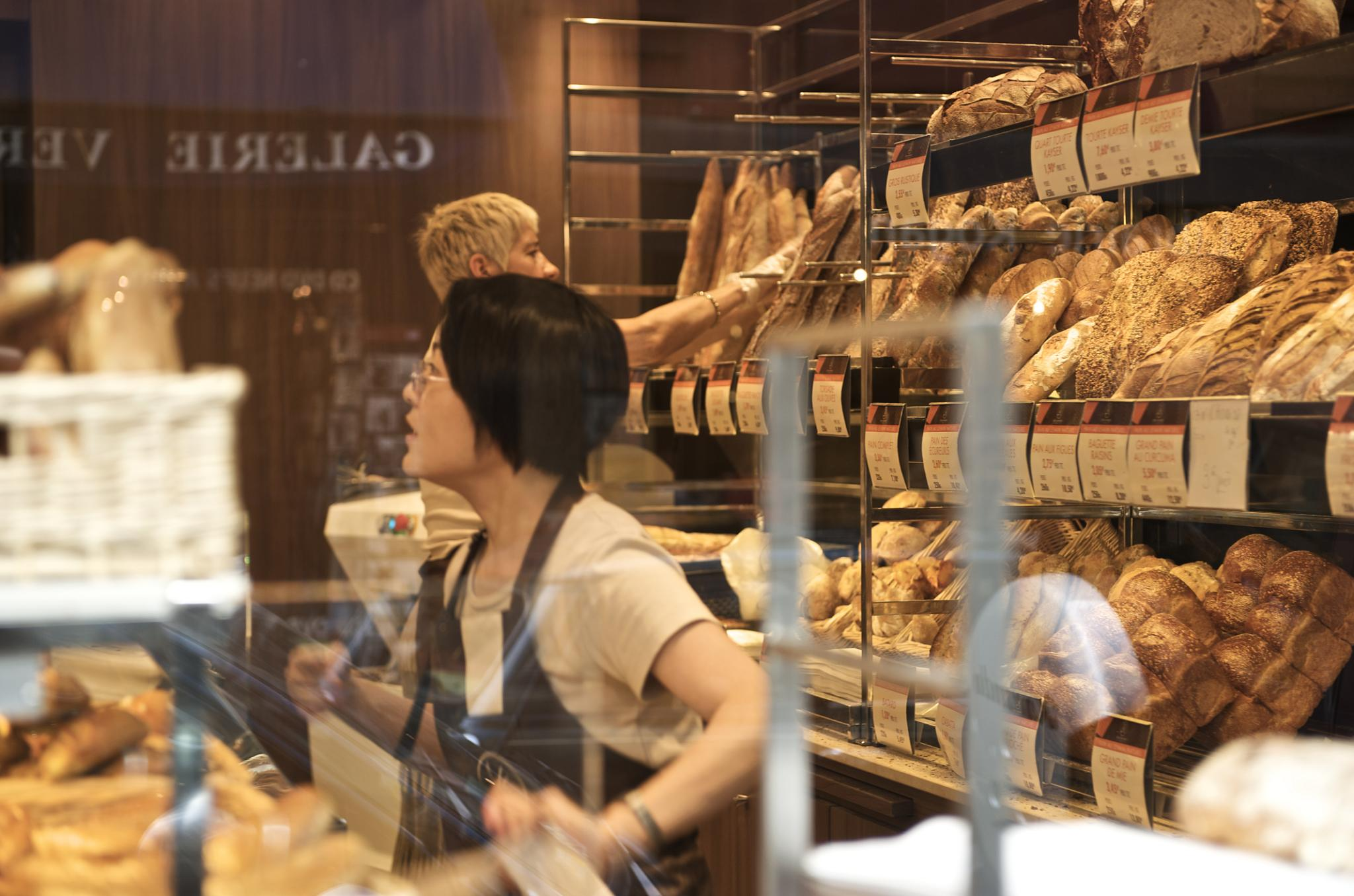
A bakery sales counter in Paris.

A bakery (also known as a bakehouse, baker's shop or bake shop) is an establishment that produces and sells flour-based baked goods made in an oven such as bread, cookies, cakes, doughnuts, pizzas, bagels, pastries, and pies. Some retail bakeries are also categorized as cafés, serving coffee and tea to customers who wish to consume the baked goods on the premises. In some countries, a distinction is made between bakeries, which primarily sell breads, and pâtisseries, which primarily sell sweet baked goods.

== History ==
In the Roman Empire, baking was a highly esteemed profession, as Roman citizens used them frequently for important occasions such as feasts and weddings. Around 300 BCE, baking was introduced as an occupation and respectable profession for the Romans. Bakers began to prepare bread at home in an oven, using grist mills to grind grain into flour for their breads. The demand for baked goods grew in tandem with the empire, and the first bakers' guild was established in 168 BCE in Rome. The desire for baked goods promoted baking throughout Europe and expanded into eastern parts of Asia. Bakers started baking bread and other goods at home and selling them on the streets.

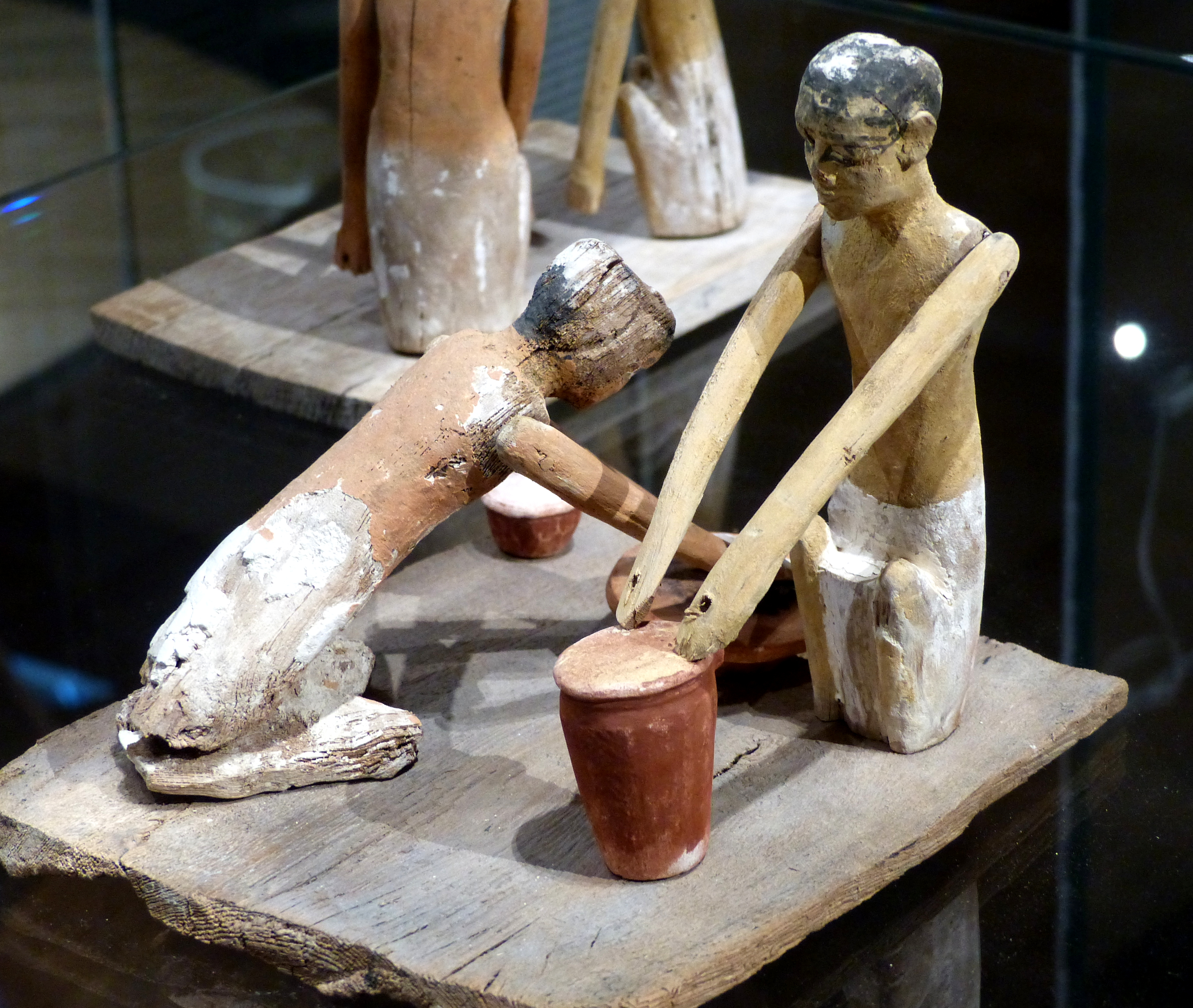
Egyptian ushabti statues of a bakery, c. 2500 – c. 1800 BCE at the Paneum museum in Upper Austria.

This trend became common, and soon, baked products were sold on the streets of Rome, Germany, London, and other European cities. A system for delivering baked goods to households arose as the demand increased significantly. This prompted bakers to establish places where people could purchase baked goods. The first open-air market for baked goods in Europe was established in Paris; since then, bakeries have become popular places to socialize.

On July 7, 1928, Otto Frederick Rohwedder invented an automatic bread-slicing machine, in a bakery in Chillicothe, Missouri. While the bread initially failed to sell, due to a perceived "sloppy" appearance of the loaves and the fact that it went stale faster, it later became popular. In World War II, bread slicing machines became rare, as the metal in them was required for wartime use. When they were requisitioned, creating 100 tons of metal alloy, the decision proved very unpopular with housewives.

World War II had a profound impact on the bread industry in the United Kingdom. When the war began, baking schools closed due to food rationing, manpower shortage, and other material factors. Once WWII came to a close, there was a lack of skilled bakers in the UK. This baker shortage resulted in new methods being developed to satisfy the world's desire for bread, including chemical additives, premixes, and specialized machinery. Old methods of baking were almost completely eradicated when these new, mechanized processes were introduced, and the industry became industrialized and dominated by large commercial firms. The older, more labor-intensive methods were, by and large, seen as burdensome, out-of-date, and commercially unprofitable. As a result, few traditional bakeries were left open by the end of the twentieth century.

== Specialities ==
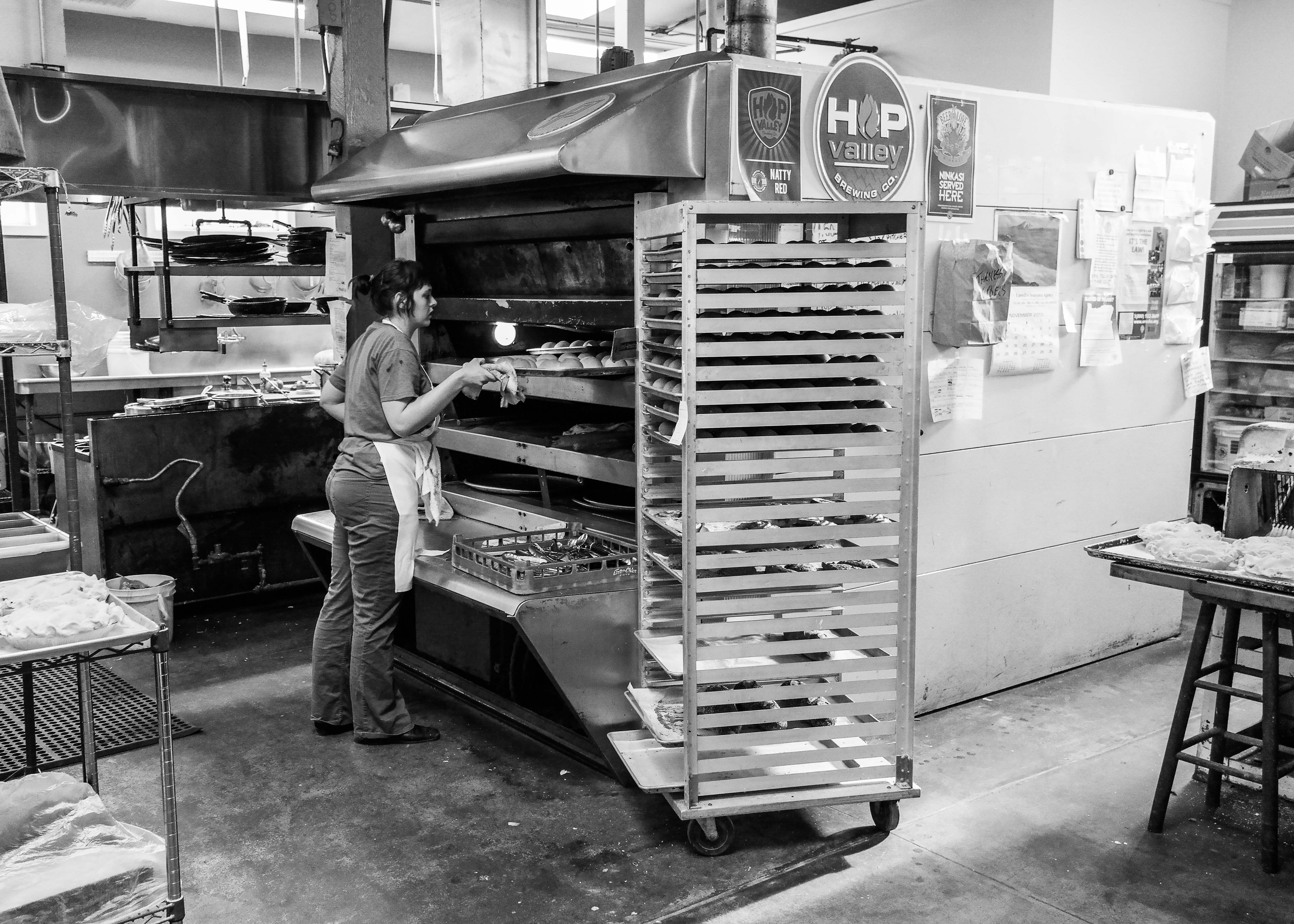
A bakery inside the former Burton's Saw Factory in the Eugene Blair Boulevard Historic Commercial Area.

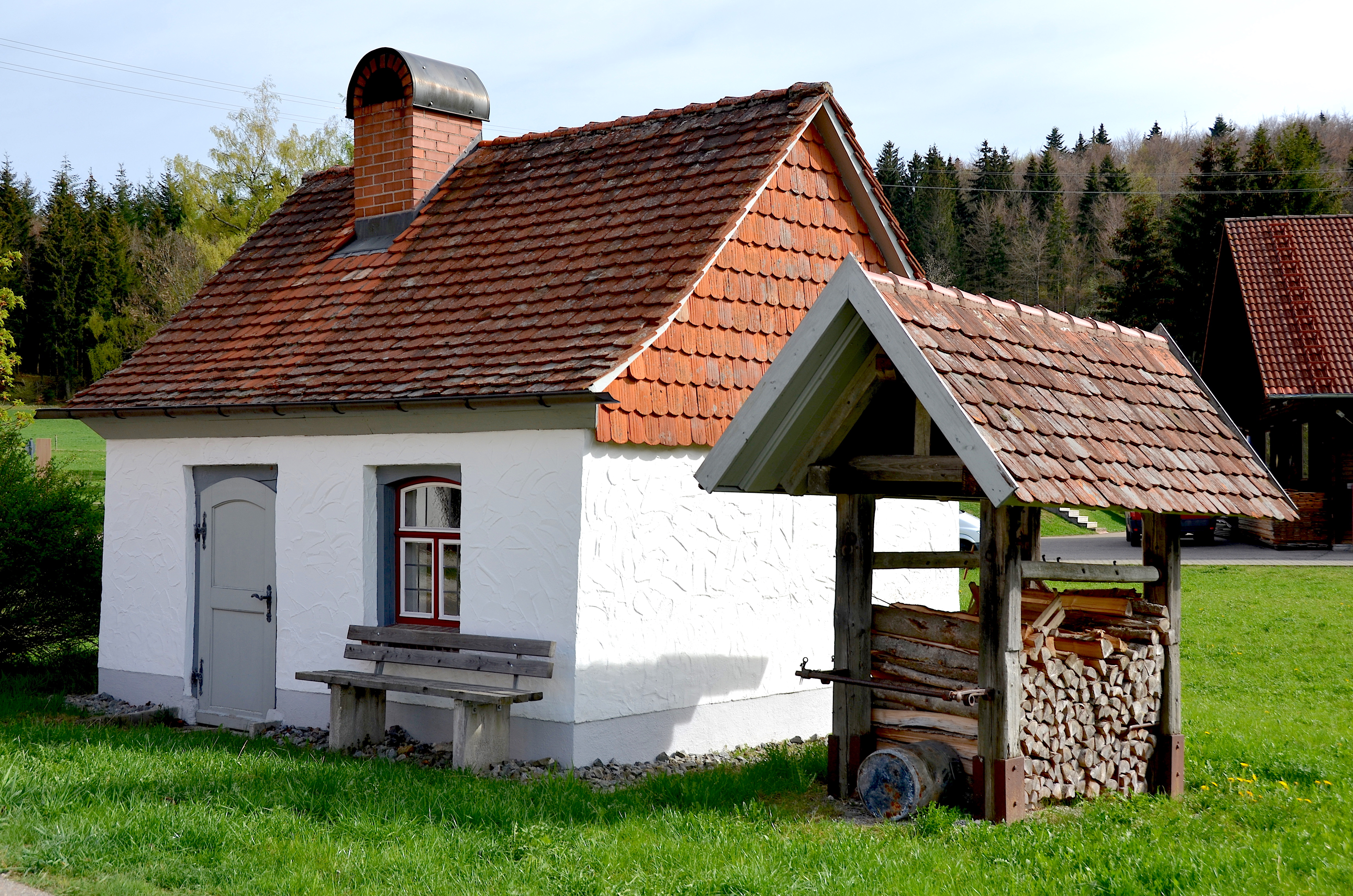
A village bakehouse in Meßstetten, a town in Baden-Württemberg, Germany.

Some bakeries provide services for special occasions (such as weddings, anniversaries, birthday parties, business networking events, etc.) or customized baked products for people who have allergies or sensitivities to certain foods (such as nuts, peanuts, dairy or gluten, etc.). Bakeries can provide a wide range of cake designs such as sheet cakes, layer cakes, wedding cakes, tiered cakes, etc. Other bakeries may specialize in traditional or hand-made types of baked products made with locally milled flour, without flour bleaching agents or flour treatment agents, baking what is sometimes referred to as artisan bread.

In many countries, many grocery stores and supermarkets sell cakes, sliced bread (sometimes prepackaged or presliced) and other pastries. They may also offer in-store baking, with products either fully baked on site or part-baked prior to delivery to store, and some offer cake decoration.

=== France ===
In France, a boulangerie may only sell breads, and a pâtisserie may only sell pastries, biscuits and cakes, but many of both sell both types of baked goods. The term 'viennoiserie' refers to simpler breakfast-syle pastries (danishes, torts, eclairs, etc.) which are considered "in between" boulangerie and pâtisserie products; unlike the other two terms, 'viennoiserie' does not refer to a bakery or shop that sells such products.

boulangerie

A boulangerie specializes in risen-dough breads such as baguettes and pain de mie. The breads made and sold are also called boulangerie. The term 'boulangerie' is legally protected: a shop can only use the name if the baker themselves selected the raw ingredients, kneaded the dough, leavened, baked, and sold the bread at the shop.

pâtisserie

A pâtisserie is a bakery that specializes in dessert goods, confections, and the like. Pâtisserie are almost entirely dessert-focused, and are generally made from cake or from types of pastry dough – choux, flaky, filo, shortcrust, and puff. Typical pâtisserie include Napoleon (mille-feuille), Madeleines, and profiteroles. In France and Belgium, a bakery can only legally call itself a pâtisserie if it employs a licensed maitre pâtissier ('master pastry chef').

== Products ==
- Bagels
- Barmbrack
- Biscotti
- Biscuits (unleavened)
- Biscuits (quick bread)
- Bread roll
- Bread
- Buns
- Cakes
- Brownies
- Cookies
- Cornbread
- Crackers
- Croissants
- Crumpets
- Cupcakes
- Donuts
- Flatbreads
- Kalakukko
- Muffins
- Pandesal
- Pastries
- Pasties
- Pies
- Pita
- Pizzas
- Pretzels
- Puff pastry
- Pumpkin bread
- Sausage rolls
- Scones
- Soda bread
- Sourdough
- Tarts
- Waffles

== See also ==
- Bakehouse – Building for baking bread
- Baker – Person who bakes and optionally sells bread products
- Baking – Food-producing method
- Cake decorating – Art of decorating a cake
- Coffeehouse – Establishment that serves coffee
- Doughnut shop
- Konditorei – Business that sells pastries
- Pâtisserie – Type of bakery specializing in sweet baked goods and desserts, and the good themselves
- List of baked goods
- List of bakeries
- Pie shop – Food outlet
- Sliced bread – Loaf of bread pre-sliced with a machine
- Tea house – Cafe-type business serving tea
