= C2H6N4O2 =

The molecular formula C_{2}H_{6}N_{4}O_{2} (molar mass: 118.09 g/mol, exact mass: 118.0491 u) may refer to:

- Biurea
- Oxalyldihydrazide
