= Graham flour =

Coarse-ground whole-wheat flour

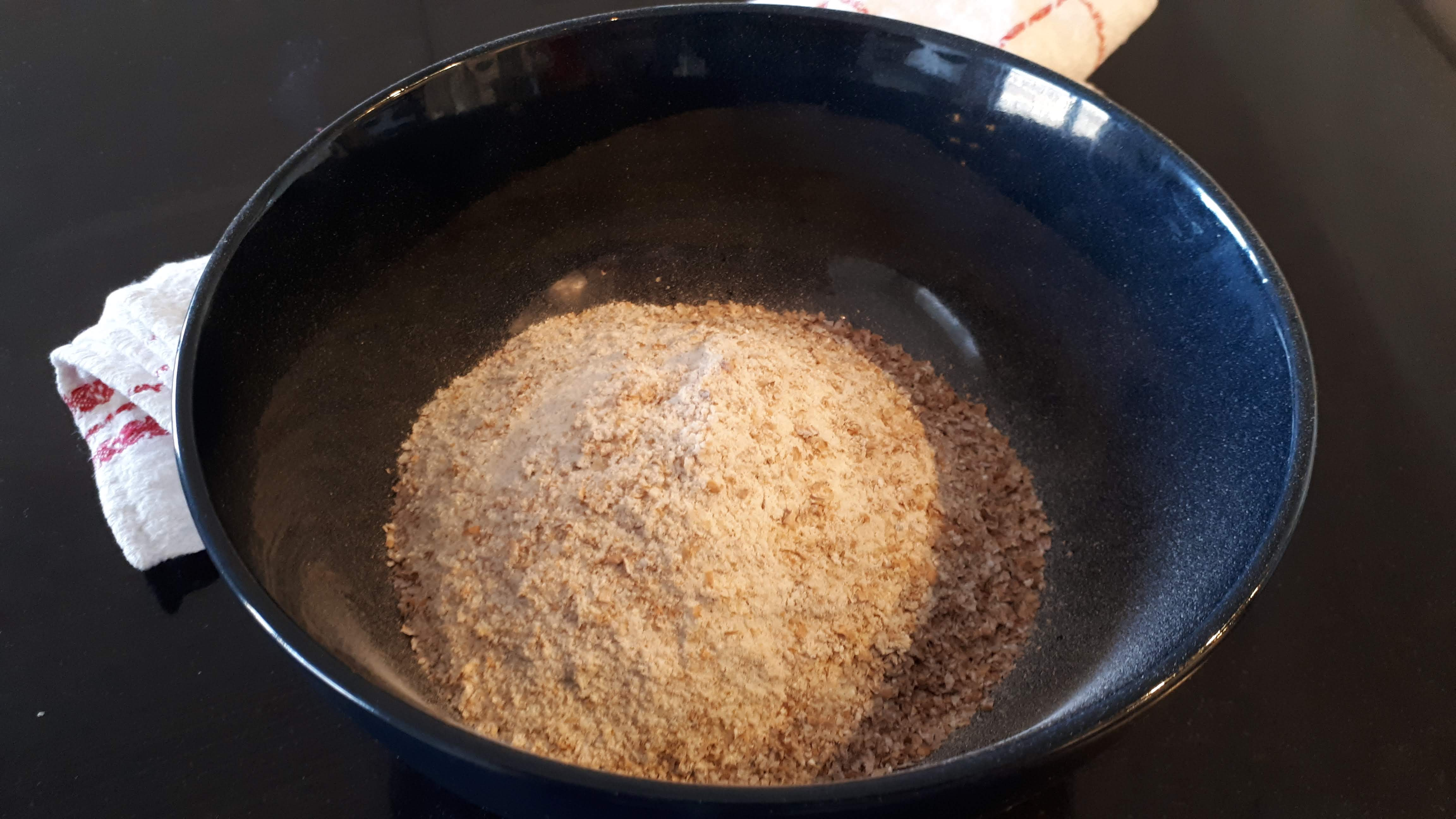
Graham flour in a bowl

Graham flour is a type of coarse-ground flour of whole wheat named after Sylvester Graham. It is similar to conventional whole-wheat flour in that both are made from the whole grain (germ, bran, and endosperm), but graham flour is more coarsely ground. It is not sifted ("bolted") with a flour dresser after milling. This conservative milling process prevents graham flour from containing additional chemicals or additives, like in white flour. Current food studies report that graham flour has a protein content of around 13%, nearly identical to whole-wheat flour and only contains 2% more protein than white flour.

== Sources ==
Graham flour is commonly available at health food stores, bakery supply stores, specialty food shops, or directly from a local flour mill. It is typically not found in traditional grocery stores due to its niche market and short shelf-life.

A substitute for it would be a mix of unbleached white flour and wheat middlings; this was a common substitute prior to and after the passage of the Pure Food and Drug Act in 1906, but the Food and Drug Administration (FDA) gradually established standards and eliminated imitations from the market.

== Milling ==
Graham flour is processed and milled very similarly to whole-wheat flour, but is not sifted and is more coarsely ground. The germ, bran, and endosperm are preserved and remain present in graham flour after the milling process has completed, leaving the whole grain to be present throughout. During this, the germ and bran are ground separately and remain coarse, but the endosperm is ground finely. The grain is typically milled using a stone or roller mill, allowing for the preservation of all grain components and careful separation of each grain part. All components are then combined together to create graham flour.

== History ==
Graham flour is named after Sylvester Graham (1794–1851), an early advocate for dietary reform. Graham's dietary reforms held a primary focus on the connection between diet and its effect on one's character. His teachings stemmed from his beliefs that industrialization in America was leading to the death of "organic man", leaving America's social harmony to be "shattered". Graham's followers, or "Grahamites", followed teachings stating that the body should be kept in balanced by abstaining from overly processed foods to maintain proper spiritual and physical health. Graham's dietary reforms would also be linked to one's sexual activity as Graham believed that "excitement" or sexual stimulation would deteriorate the body due to overstimulation of the balanced system.

Sylvester Graham despised discarding valuable nutrients such as germ and bran, particularly when preparing flour for white bread. In white flour, these nutrients are supplemented with other chemicals and additives, like flour bleaching agents to remove the natural yellow pigment, xanthophyll. As the grain is preserved throughout the milling process, Graham believed that the lack of additives would remedy poor physiological health in Americans, aiding in mending spiritual and physical decay from eating processed or refined foods.

== See also ==
- Flour bleaching agent
- Graham bread
- Graham cracker
- Graham cracker crust
- Whole-wheat of wheat berry, sometimes eaten on its own
