= Sopa teologa =

Peruvian soup

- Type: Soup
- Place of origin: Peru
- Region or state: Trujillo
- Main ingredients: White bread, potatoes, tomatoes, sliced cheese, milk

Sopa Teologa (Theologic soup) also known as "Priest's Soup" and "sopa de festiva" is a traditional soup in Trujillo. Because it includes bread in the ingredients, and because it has an attributed religious origin, it is called theologic. It is made of white bread, potatoes, tomatoes, sliced cheese and milk. It can have chicken or turkey meat, sometimes both. Seasonings include garlic, leek, celery, oregano, pepper, salt, white onion, bay leaf, and yellow chili pepper.
