= Bonn Group of Industries =

Indian Food & products company

- Company type: Partnership Firm
- Industry: Food processing
- Founded: 1985
- Founder: Manjit Singh
- Headquarters: Ludhiana, Punjab, India
- Products: Bakery products, including biscuits, bread, cakes
- Owner: Manjit Singh
- Website: www.bonn.in

Bonn Group of Industries is food company based in Ludhiana Punjab, India. Founded in 1985, it produces a variety of food products including breads, biscuits, cakes and cookies. These products are sold in both Indian and International markets. The company is registered under ISO 22000 – 2005 Certification by TUV as well as ISO 9001-2008 by TNV Certification. Operations are approved by the Bureau of Indian Standards (BIS). The founder and chairman of the company is Manjit Singh. The Group expanded into many units in northern region of India with their headquarters in Jhabewal, Chandigarh Road, Ludhiana. The factory works are handled by two units running under the names of Bonn Food Industries and Bonn Nutrients Pvt. Ltd.

== History ==
Bonn was founded as a traditional bread baking company in 1985 by Manjit Singh and moved over to mechanized food processing in 1994.

Bonn opened a second food processing unit in 2004, with the name "Bonn Food Industries", that specialized in the manufacturing of biscuits, cakes, and cookies.

Bonn products
Bread	White Bread, Brown Bread, Wheat Bread, Frooty Bread, Super Sandwich Bread, Bake white Bread, Garlic Bread, Buns, Paws, Kulcha Bread
Biscuits	Cream Delight, Sweet Cream, Butter, Crack Nuts, Coconut, Glucobon, Butter Pista, Twin Bite, Saltino, Wholewheat Digestive, Marie day, Minibits, Ginger cookie
Cakes	Sweet Cakes

== Sub-units ==
Bonn is a multi-product company that is divided into several subsidiary companies.

- Bonn Nutrients Pvt. Ltd.: The first work processing unit was established in 1994 and the headquarters is in Jhabewal, Chandigarh Road, Ludhiana. The plant inside the unit was used in producing a variety of breads like White Bread, Brown Bread, Wheat Bread, Frooty Bread, and Sandwich Breads.
- Bonn Food Industry Ltd.: Another big factory unit in Hrian, Chandigarh Road, Ludhiana, which was established in 2004. It has two divisions; one is related to the manufacturing of biscuits and cookies and was named S.S. Enterprises, and the other plant that produces cake was named Bonn Food Industries.
- Prime Packaging: Packaging is done under this unit, which is located in Focal Point, Ludhiana.
- Choice Agros Pvt. Ltd.: Manufactures agro products and is located in Kapurthala, Punjab.
- House of Veda Pt. Ltd.: Manufactures organic products and is located in Ludhiana, Punjab.

== Network ==
Bonn Group is focused on selling its products to both national and global markets. Bonn sells its product widely in Northern India. Internationally, Bonn Biscuits are sold to the US, Canada, Europe, the Caribbean, Africa, and Australia.

== Consumer interactions ==
Bonn actively sponsored and organized many public events in schools, colleges, and music events in the Punjab, Haryana and Himachal Pradesh. Many schools and colleges visit the food industry every year and learn how the bulk production of different food products like biscuits and cakes is done.

In 2002, the company received the National Award for quality products from Honorable Union Finance Minister Sh. Jaswant Singh and Small Scale Industry Minister Smt. Vasundhara Raje. In an interview with Manjit Singh on 8 January 2012 by Business Today's editor Anish J. Mahajan called in the headlines "Singh wants to be King", covered his story on how he became a ruling player in the food industry. Singh said, "I want to become a national player and be the leader in my field".

== See also ==
- Indian bread
- List of food companies
