= Graham bread =

Type of bread inspired by Sylvester Graham

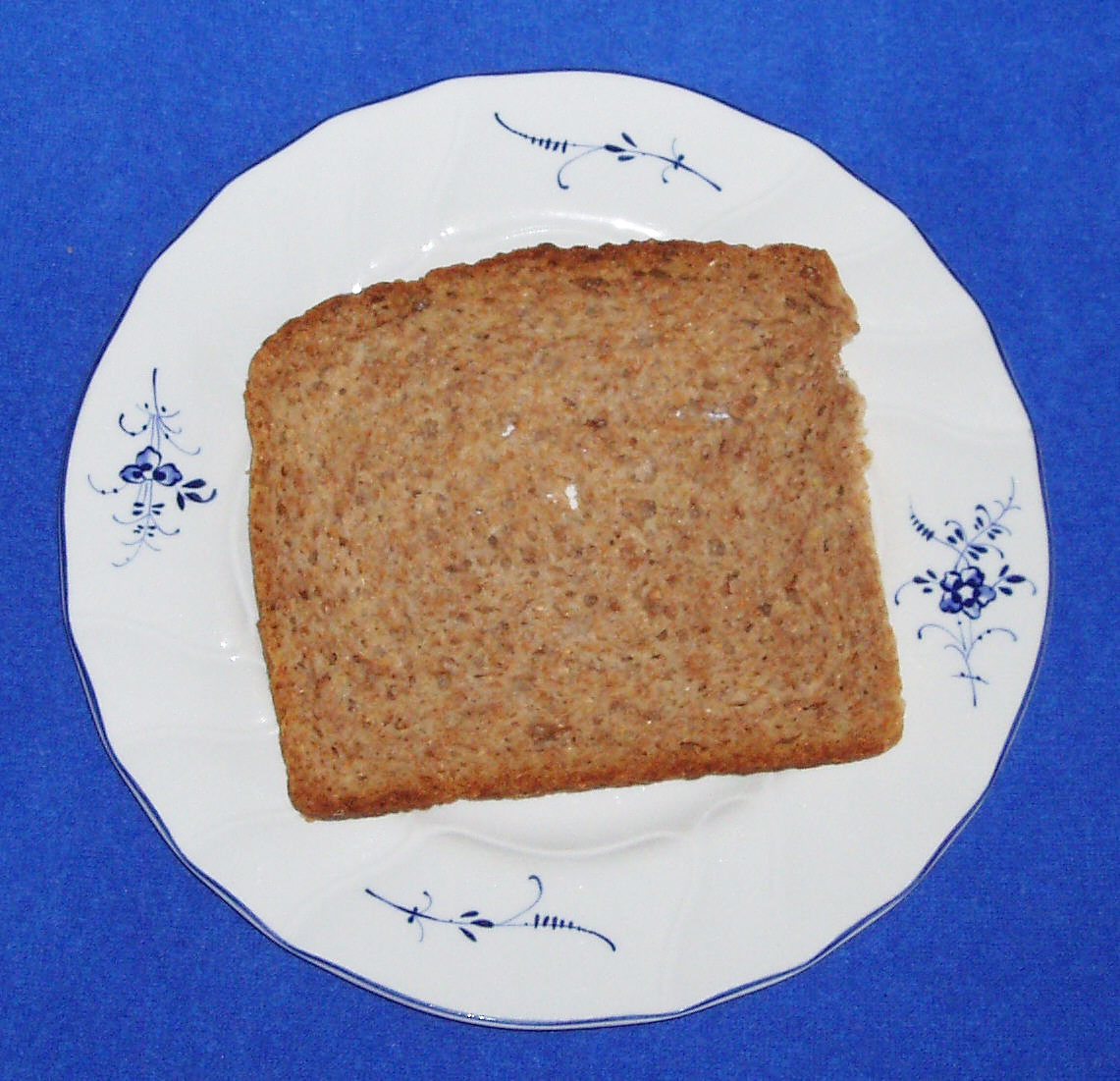
- Type: Bread
- Place of origin: United States
- Main ingredients: Whole-wheat flour

Graham bread is a name for whole wheat bread that was inspired by the teachings of health reformer Sylvester Graham. The ingredients for Graham bread include Graham flour, milk, molasses, yeast, and salt.

== History ==
Sylvester Graham was a 19th-century health reformer who argued that a vegetarian diet, anchored by bread that was baked at home from a coarsely ground whole-wheat flour, was part of a healthful lifestyle that could prevent disease.

In 1837, Graham published the popular book Treatise on Bread and Bread-Making, which included a history of bread and described how to make Graham bread, though the passage is absent of any exact measurements and instead calls upon the baker's "good judgment." It was reprinted in 2012 by Andrews McMeel Publishing, as a selection of its American Antiquarian Cookbook Collection.

Like Graham crackers, Graham bread was high in fiber and made from graham flour free from the chemical additives that were common in white bread at that time such as alum and chlorine. He argued that these chemical additives were unwholesome.

== See also ==
- Brown bread, a bread that was considered undesirable in early 19th century Europe
- Whole wheat flour
- Flour bleaching agent
- Health food
- Horsebread, a medieval European coarse bread that may have additionally contained the husks or chaff of the grains as well as legumes
- Maida flour, example of a bleached flour used in India
