= Eggflip (restaurant) =

Restaurant in Minneapolis

Coordinates: 44°58′36.5952″N 93°16′11.8452″W

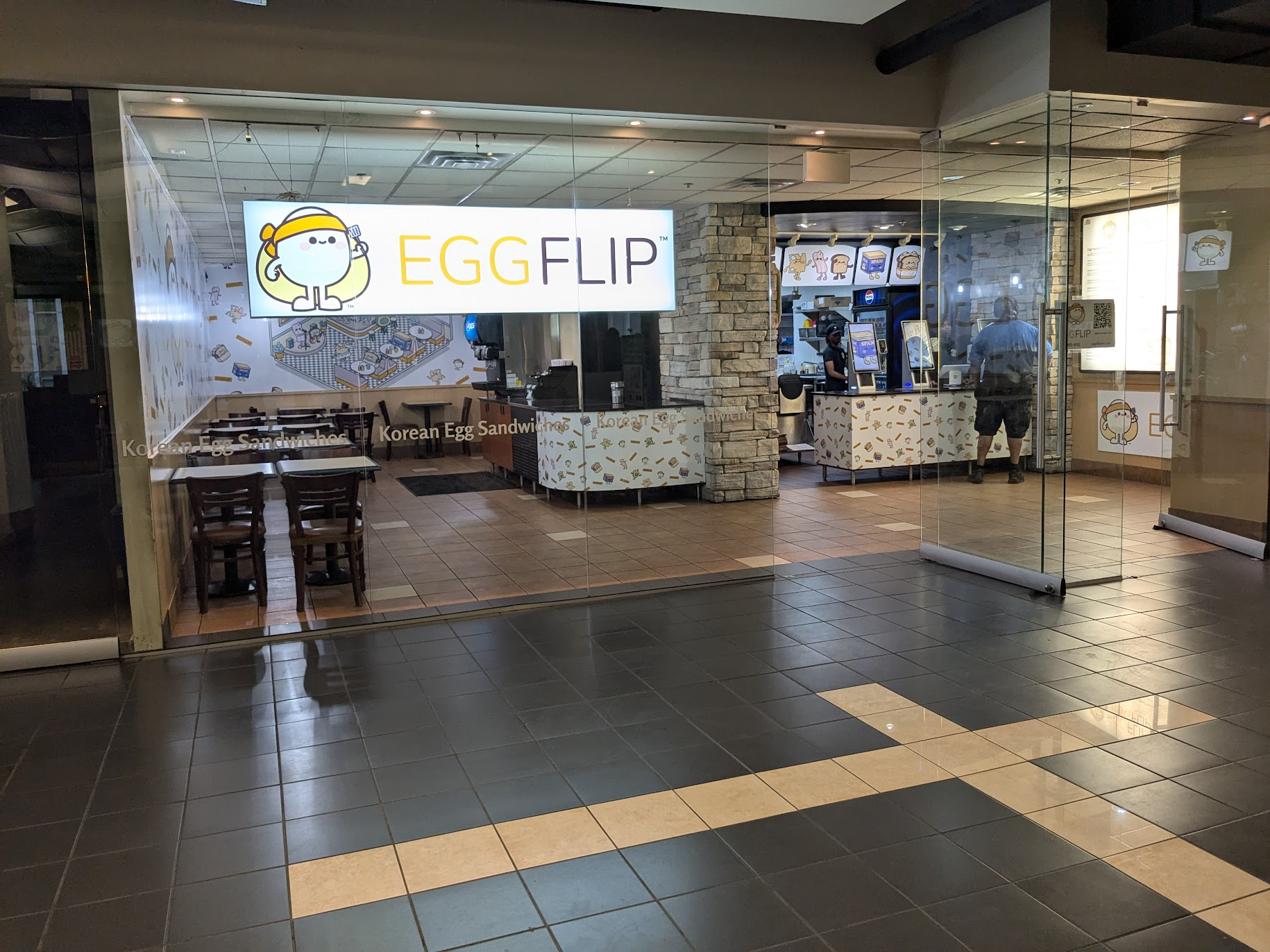
- Entrance to the restaurant during open hours.
- Interactive map of Eggflip

Restaurant information
- Established: March 18, 2024
- Owner: Flip Koumalasy
- Food type: Korean
- Location: 601 Marquette Avenue South, Minneapolis, Hennepin, Minnesota, 55402, United States
- Website: eggflipmn.com

Eggflip (stylized as EGGFLIP) is an American sandwich shop, specializing in Korean-style egg sandwiches, located in Minneapolis, Minnesota. Its menu consists primarily of breakfast sandwiches, bowls, and burritos. Chef and owner Flip Koumalasy opened the restaurant on March 18, 2024, in the second floor retail corridor of the Six Quebec residential building.

== Description ==
Eggflip's menu consists mostly of breakfast sandwiches, burritos, bowls, and tater tots. Items include an egg sandwich with beef bulgogi, burritos with eggs, cheese, ham, and hash browns, and bowls with turkey sausage, tater tots, and gravy. The restaurant uses cage-free eggs in their dishes and incorporates hollandaise sauce into their scrambled eggs. Other ingredients include toasted milk bread, avocado, and gochujang mayonnaise. The restaurant is open for breakfast and lunch Monday through Friday.

== History ==
The Six Quebec storefront now occupied by Eggflip, as pictured in July 2023.

Eggflip opened on March 18, 2024, on the skyway level of the Six Quebec residential condominium building. Their retail space was previously occupied by a Taco John's restaurant, which previously closed in July 2023. An artist helped design the space, incorporating an anime theme by transforming ingredients such as eggs and toast into characters for wall decorations. Chef and owner Flip Koumalasy decided to open his own standalone restaurant following his previous employment at Ann Ahmed's Lemongrass restaurant in nearby Brooklyn Park, Minnesota. Regarding his decision to open a relatively new dining concept in the Minneapolis Skyway System, he told the Minneapolis/St. Paul Business Journal: "It's new and it's exciting, and also everybody loves breakfast. Being at the skyway, there's a lot of foot traffic there and I want to feed all the people before they get to work."

== Reception ==
Mpls St. Paul Magazine food and dining editor Stephanie March provided a positive review prior to its opening: "I hope someone comes in and gives Flip a huge bucket of cash so that he can run around town and open Eggflips everywhere, because I want one on my breakfast route." KARE 11's Diane Sandberg wrote that "it might just be the best egg sandwich you've ever had." In Star Tribune's "The 5 Best Things Our Food Writers Ate in the Twin Cities This Week" column, writer Joy Summers reviewed Eggflip's The Flip Sandwich, which she shared: "Each bite hits all the textural notes with crispy, crunchy, tender and gooey. It's a hefty portion, and I admitted defeat long before finishing. But I did reach for a fork and dig out every last bite of those lush scrambled eggs that were possibly better than homemade." KMSP-TV's Shayne Wells felt it was "unexpected" that "one of the hottest dining destinations" in the city would be located in the Minneapolis Skyway System.
