= Sandwich bread =

Bread designed for sandwich making

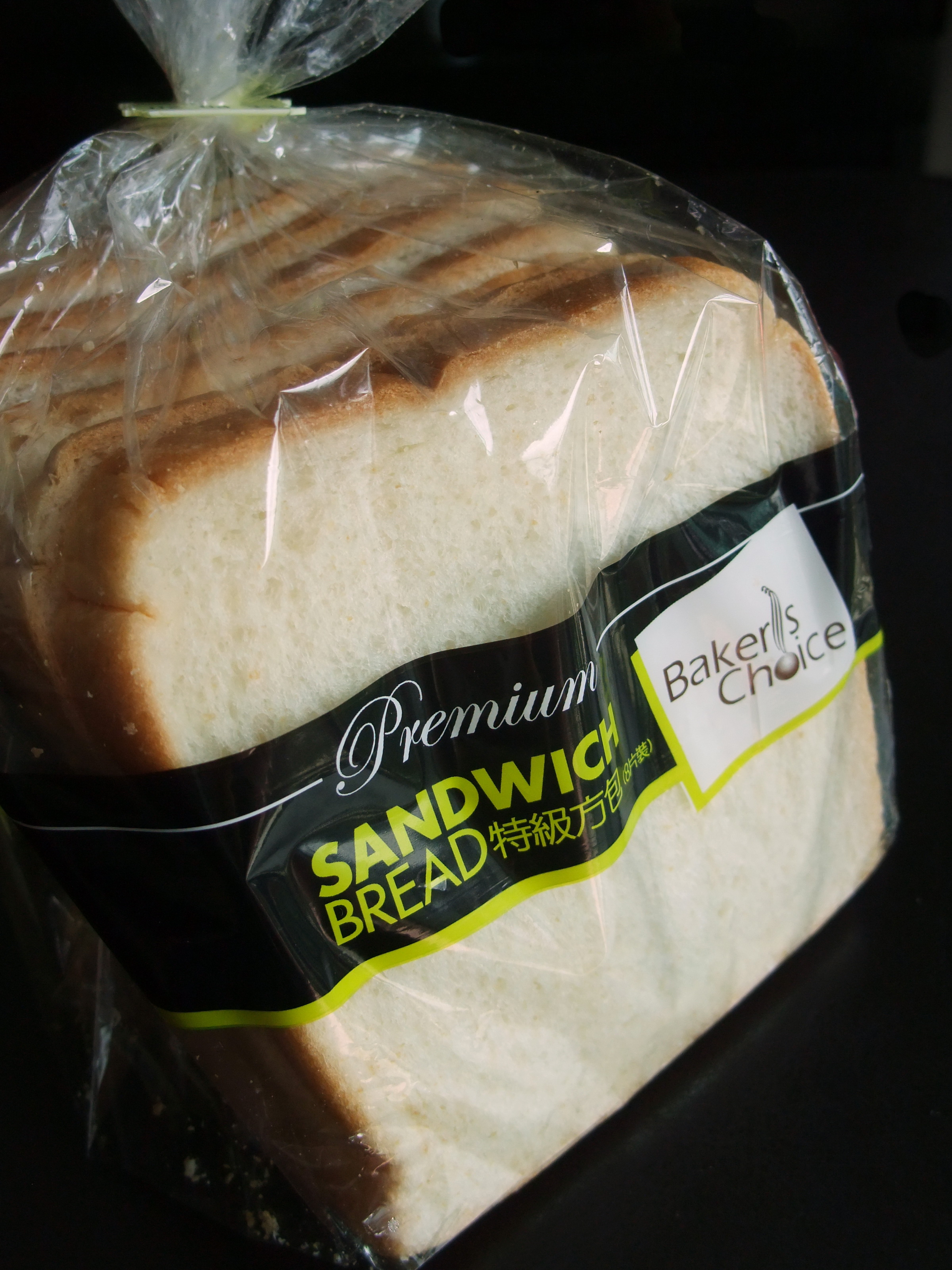
A commercially produced sandwich bread

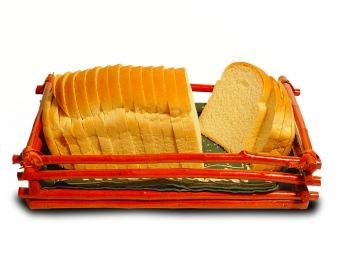
Sliced white bread

Sandwich bread (also referred to as sandwich loaf) is bread that is prepared specifically to be used for the preparation of sandwiches. Sandwich breads are produced in many varieties, such as white, whole wheat, sourdough, rye, multigrain and others.

== Description ==
Sandwich bread is overwhelmingly commercially baked and pre-sliced, though any similarly shaped loaf can be turned into sandwiches by hand. It may be formulated to slice easily, cleanly or uniformly, and may have a fine crumb (texture) and light body. Sandwich bread may be designed to have a balanced proportion of crumb and crust, whereby the bread holds and supports fillings in place and reduces drips and messiness. Some may be designed to not become crumbly, hardened, dried or have too compressible a texture.

Sandwich bread can refer to cross-sectionally square, sliced white and wheat bread, which has been described as "perfectly designed for holding square luncheon meat". The bread used for preparing finger sandwiches is sometimes referred to as sandwich bread. Pain de mie is a sandwich loaf.

== History ==
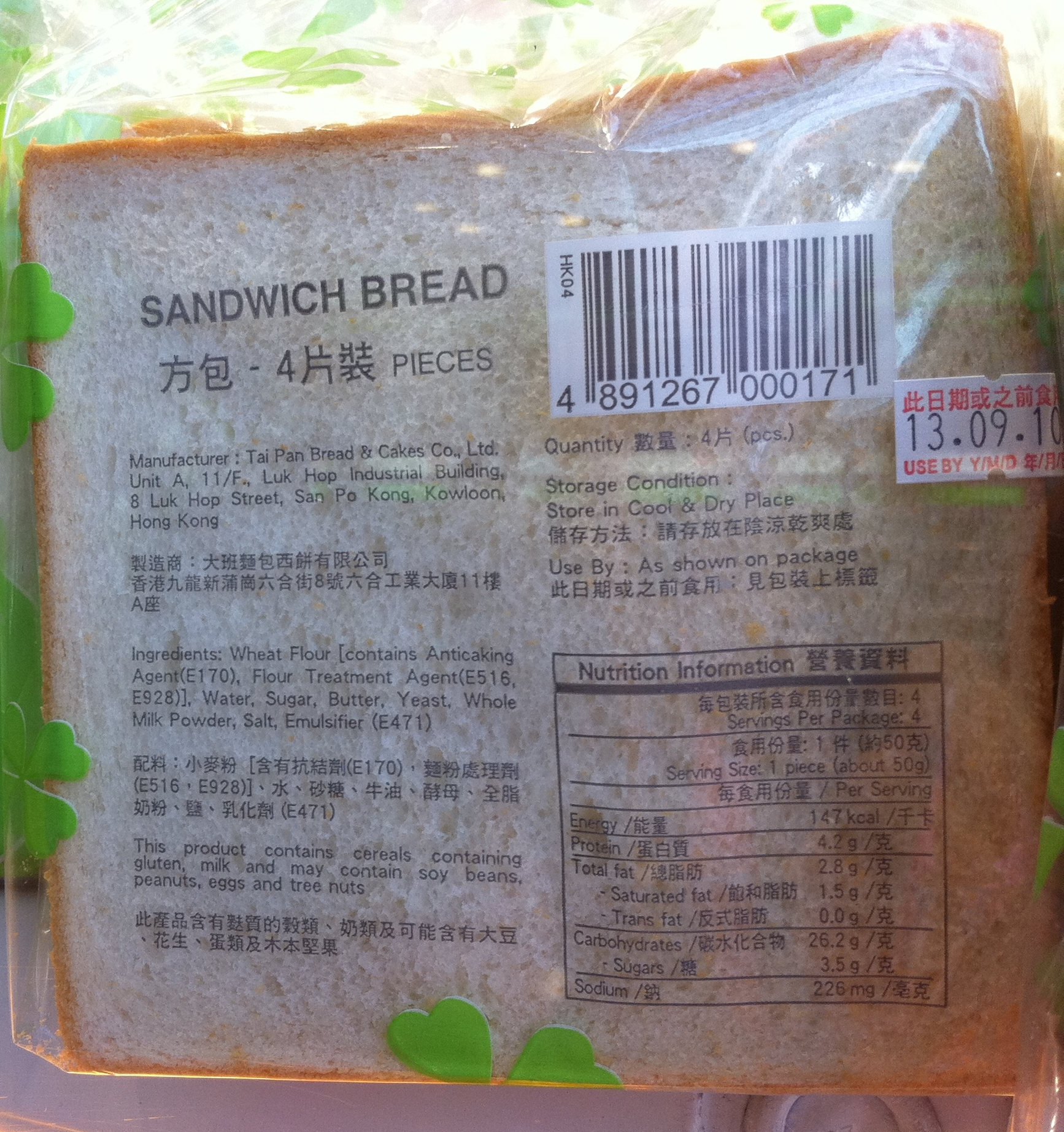
Tai Pan Bread & Cakes Co. sandwich bread, manufactured in Hong Kong

In the 1930s in the United States, the term sandwich loaf referred to sliced bread. In contemporary times, U.S. consumers sometimes refer to white bread such as Wonder Bread as sandwich bread and sandwich loaf. American sandwich breads have historically included some fat derived from the use of milk or oil to enrich the bread. Thin-sliced breads, wherein the bread is sliced somewhat thinner than customary, are often labeled as "sandwich bread".

Examples of U.S. bakers that produce sandwich bread are Wonder, Pepperidge Farm, and Nature's Pride. Some supermarket chains, such as Texas-based H-E-B, produce their own store brands of sandwich bread. Bonn Group of Industries of Ludhiana Punjab, India, produces a product called Super Sandwich Bread. Tai Pan Bread and Cakes Co. produces sandwich bread in Hong Kong. Mass-produced sandwich breads are sliced before being packaged.

Japanese milk bread, a specific style of sandwich bread, is popular in Asia, particularly in Japan, and has artisan status there. Bread was not a traditional food in Japan, but it came into culinary use there after the American response to post-World War II Japanese rice shortages included relief shipments of wheat. The style of bread became popular outside Asia in the 2020s.

== See also ==
- Hoagie roll (also "bulkie" and related sandwich rolls)
- List of breads
- List of sandwiches
- Pullman loaf – sometimes referred to as sandwich loaf

== Bibliography ==
- Roberts, A.G. (2008). Gluten-Free Baking Classics. Agate Publishing, Incorporated. ISBN 978-1-57284-640-1.
