= Pain de mie =

Type of French bread

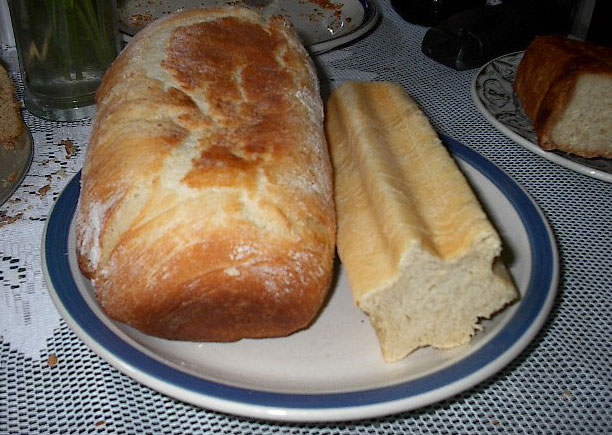
- Two loaves of pain de mie. The one on the right was baked in a star-shaped pan.
- Type: Bread
- Place of origin: France

Pain de mie (French pronunciation: [pɛ̃ də mi]) is a white or brown bread with a thin, soft crust. It is mostly sold sliced and packaged in France. Pain is the French word for "bread", and la mie is the soft part of bread, called the crumb in English.

== Description ==
Pain de mie is most similar to a pullman loaf, or to regular sandwich bread. Pain de mie usually has sugar in it, which makes it sweeter than most French breads. This bread is usually used for making sandwiches, or for toasting. It can be baked in a sealed pan, which prevents crust from forming. If not baked in a sealed pan, the crust can be cut off (as done in factories before packaging). Pain de mie is sold in rounded or rectangular shapes.
