= Japanese milk bread =

Style of bread

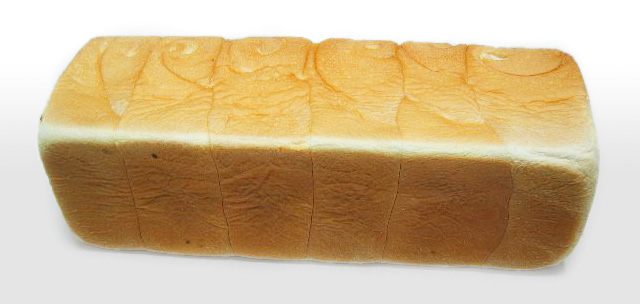
- Commercially-produced milk bread with its characteristic crust markings
- Alternative names: Shokupan; Hokkaido milk bread; pai bao
- Type: Yeasted wheat bread
- Course: Snack, meal
- Place of origin: Japan
- Main ingredients: Wheat, milk
- Ingredients generally used: Egg, butter, yeast, sugar, salt
- Similar dishes: Sandwich bread

Japanese milk bread (食パン, shokupan), also called Hokkaido milk bread, or simply milk bread in English sources, is a soft white bread commonly sold in Asian bakeries, particularly Japanese ones. Although bread is not a traditional Japanese food, it was introduced widely after World War II, and the style became a popular food item.

== Background and history ==
Soft white bread is popular in Asia, particularly in Japan, and has artisan status there. Bread was not a traditional food in Japan, but it came into culinary use there after the post–World War II Allied Occupation (led by the U.S.) included relief shipments of wheat in response to Japanese rice shortages. The style of bread became popular outside Asia in the 2020s.

Other names for it are Hokkaido milk bread, shokupan, and pai bao (排包). Shokupan translates to "eating bread" or "food bread" or "plain bread"; in Japan the style is considered the standard bread of the country, where it is a common breakfast meal or eaten as a snack. It is carried in many bakeries in Asian countries.

== Description ==
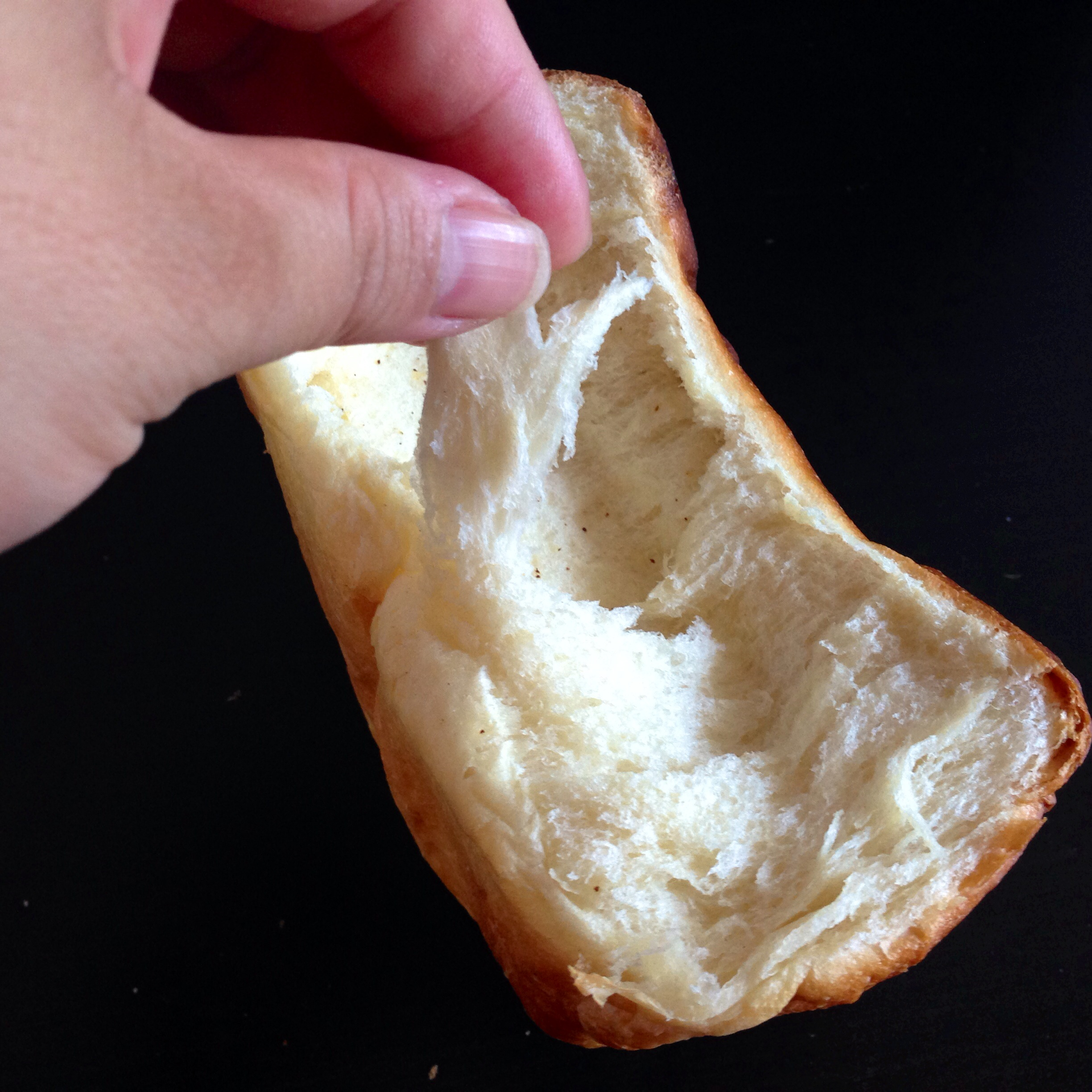
Milk bread's characteristic texture

New York Times food writer Julia Moskin describes it as "miracle of engineering: moist but not gummy, rich but light, balanced between sweet and salty." It is soft and slightly sweet with a dense, delicate crumb and chewy texture. It is generally softer and sweeter than typical commercial sandwich breads displayed in supermarket bread aisles but not as sweet as brioche. The Guardian called it "the anti-sourdough". In Japan, it is described as fuwa fuwa, which translates to "fluffy and like a cloud".

== Ingredients and technique ==
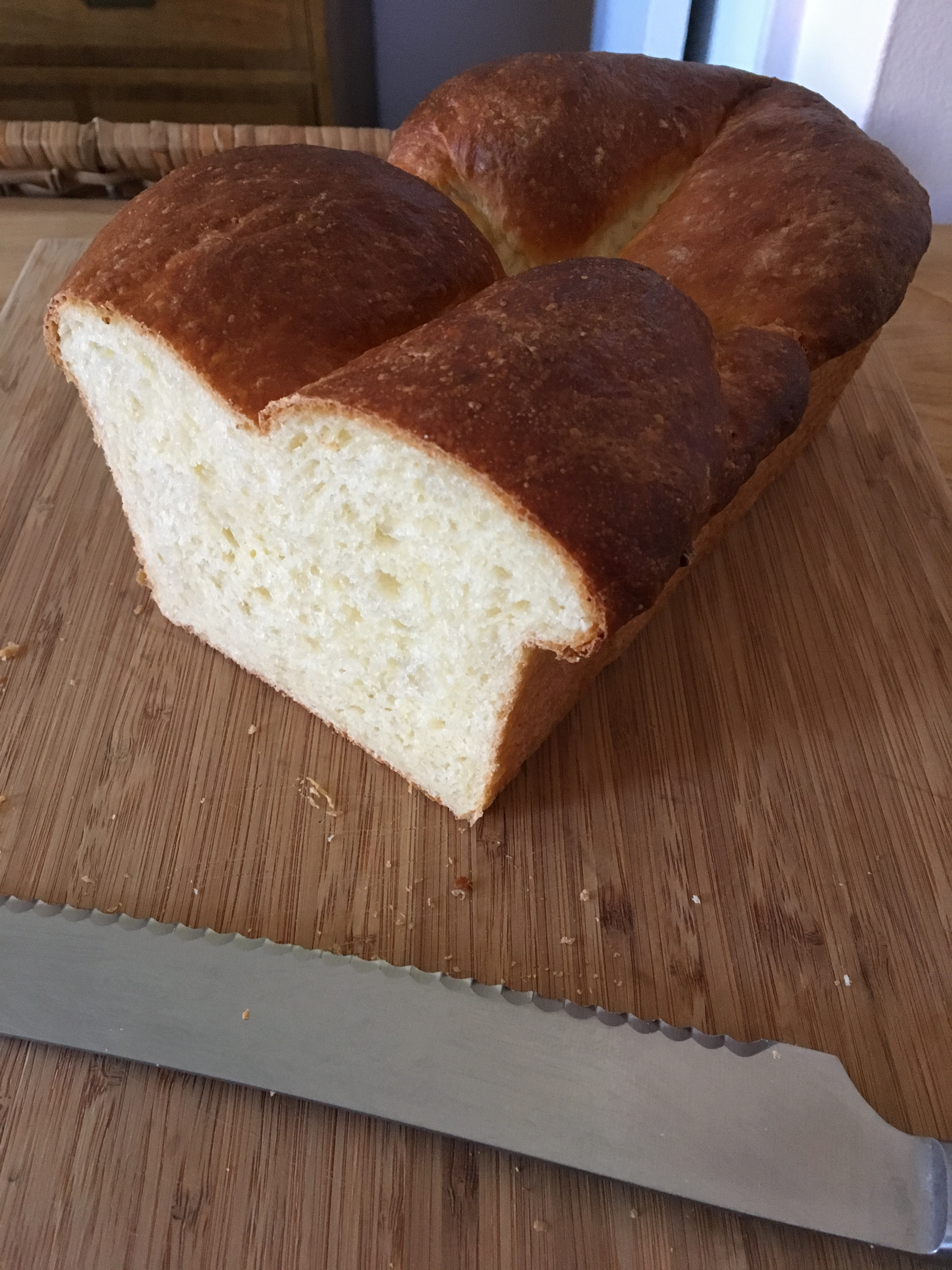
Homebaked milk bread

The dough is enriched and is created using a yudane, a type of roux. The use of the yudane helps keep the bread fresh for a longer period.

Typical ingredients include flour, whole milk, butter, yeast, salt, sugar and often eggs. The yudane is prepared and cooled, then mixed with the remaining ingredients and kneaded to form a soft, sticky dough which is often divided and formed into multiple rolls and placed crosswise into loaf pans to rise before baking, resulting in a unique appearance. Commercial producers typically bake it in a Pullman-style pan. Home bakers using an open pan will create a different but still unique shape.

== Use and serving ==
The loaves are often sliced thickly and toasted or used for sandwiches. Fruit sandwiches are a common use.
