= White bread =

Type of bread made from white wheat flour

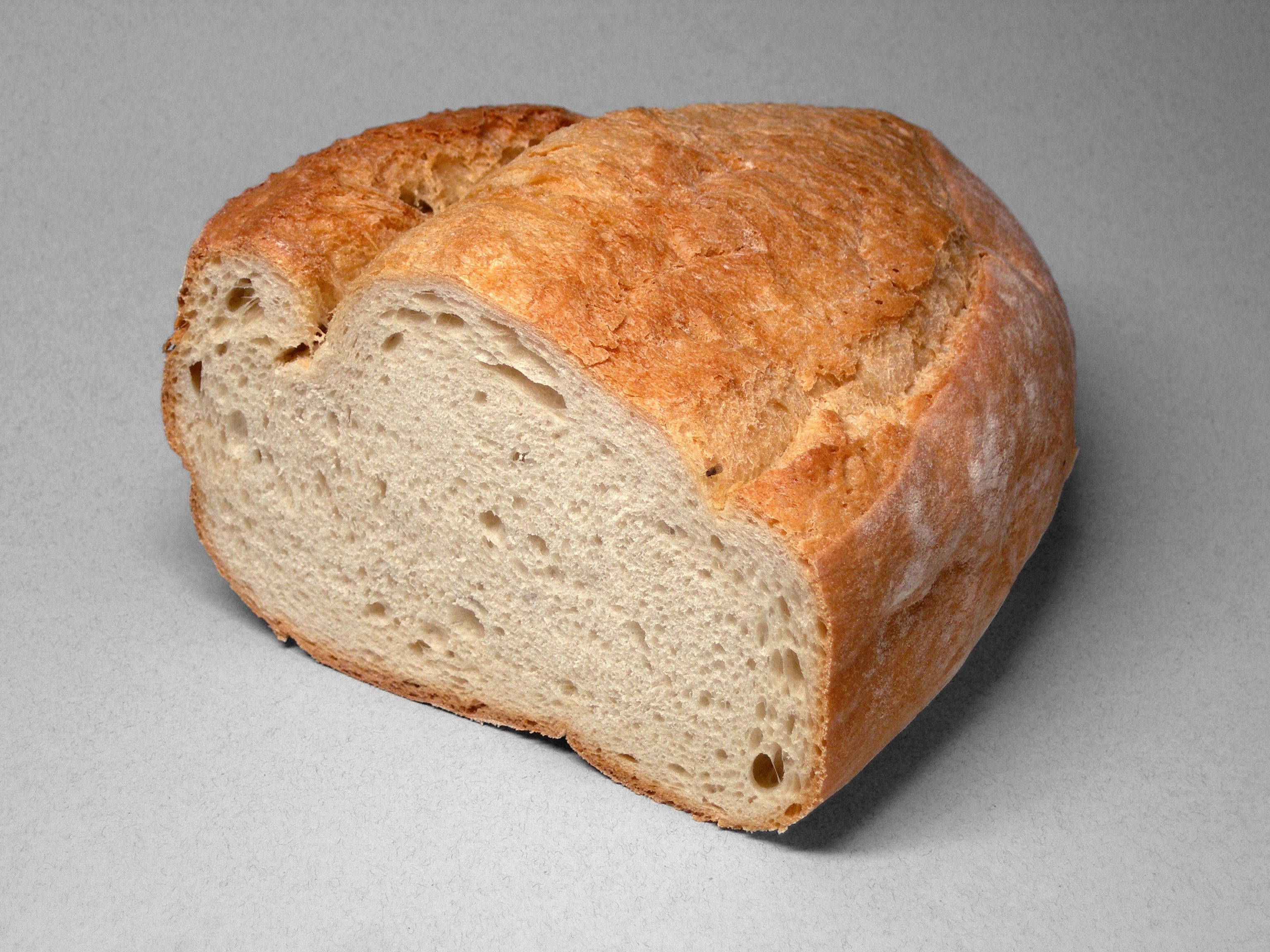
- A piece of white bread.
- Type: Bread
- Main ingredients: bread
- Other information: glycaemic load 37 (100g)

White bread typically refers to breads made from wheat flour from which the bran and the germ layers have been removed from the whole wheatberry as part of the flour grinding or milling process, producing a light-colored flour.

== Nutrition ==
White bread contains half of the magnesium found in whole-wheat bread, and it is generally considered to be less nutritionally dense.

The milling process can give white flour a longer shelf life by removing the natural oils from the whole grain. Removing the oil allows products made with the flour, like white bread, to be stored for longer periods of time avoiding potential rancidity.

== History ==
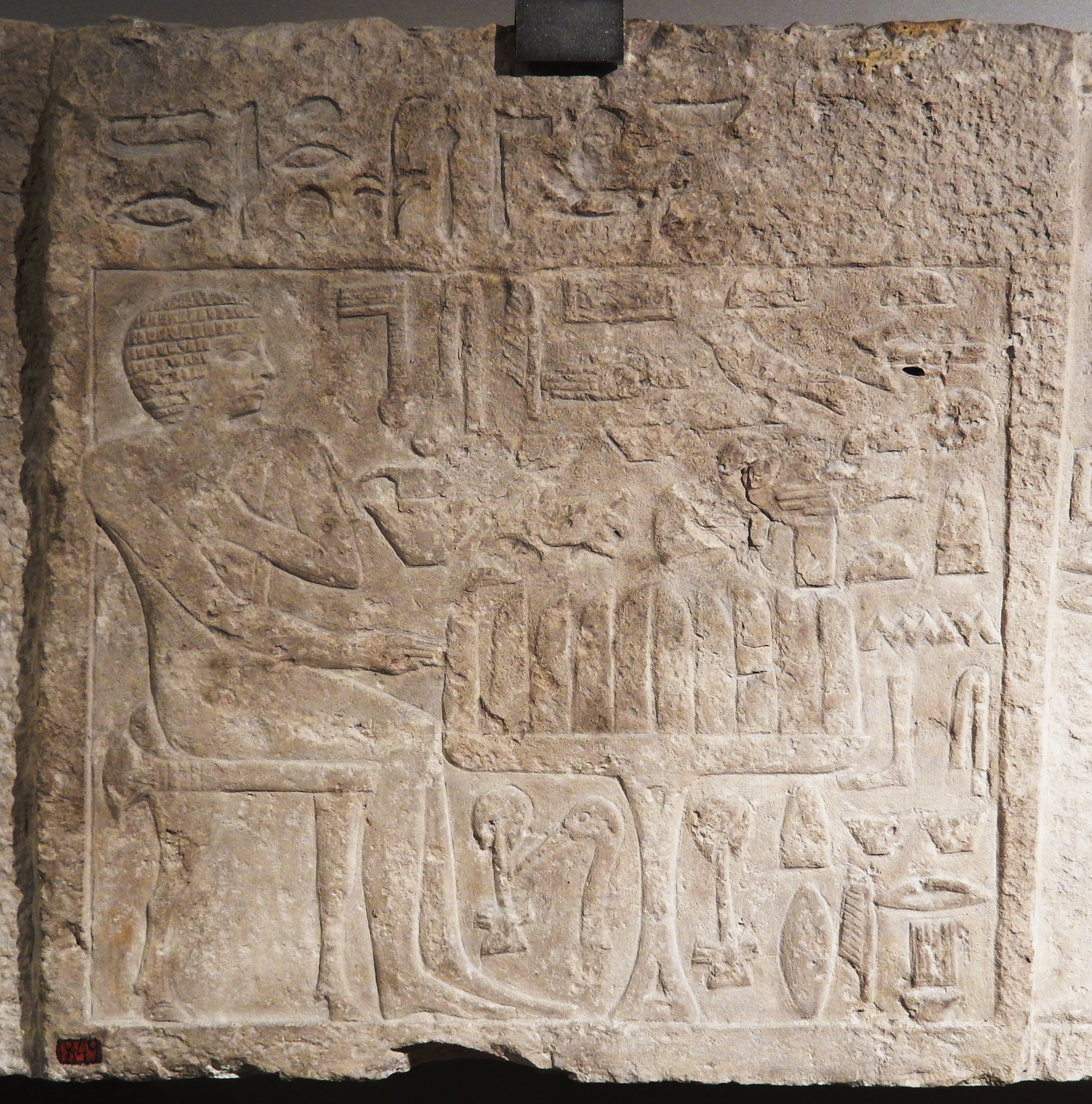
Ancient Egyptian aristocracy had access to white bread. In this image bread is depicted in Egypt in about 2,500 BC.

Bread made with grass grains goes back to the pre-agriculture Natufi proto-civilization 12,000 years ago. But only wheat can feasibly be sifted to produce pure white starch, a technique that goes back to at least ancient Egypt. Because wheat was the most expensive grain to grow, and the process to sift it labor-intensive, white flour was generally limited to special occasions and the wealthy, until the mid-19th century. During that time period, industrial processes eliminated the labor cost, allowing prices to fall until it was accessible to the middle class.

In the US, corn meal was the standard grain for bread until closing in on the 20th century, while in Europe it was other grains.

But once accessible, white bread became very popular in industrialized countries for a number of reasons:

- It was easier to see as pure and clean, at a time when some foods could be poorly made and adulterated.
- The lack of both coarseness and complex flavor profile made it a popular medium for the delivery of flavorful condiments.
- It is more easily chewed and digested. This allows it to be a source of more calories. It also does make some micronutrients more digestible, some studies finding that the added nutrition in whole grains tends to pass through the body unabsorbed. For some body types and diets, white flour may have been a nutritional benefit.
- Once it could be easily produced, it went from the most expensive to among the cheapest kinds of flour.
- It can last longer. The wheat oil in whole grain breads can go rancid over time, spoiling its flavor.

However, there was a backlash from the popularity of white flour, giving rise to whole grain alternatives popular to this day, such as graham crackers and corn flakes, which (in their original whole grain form) have more fiber and micronutrients. Eventually, the transformation of white bread from an elite to a common foodstuff became symbolic of the success of industrialization and capitalism in general, especially paired with the advent of machine sliced bread in the 1920s.

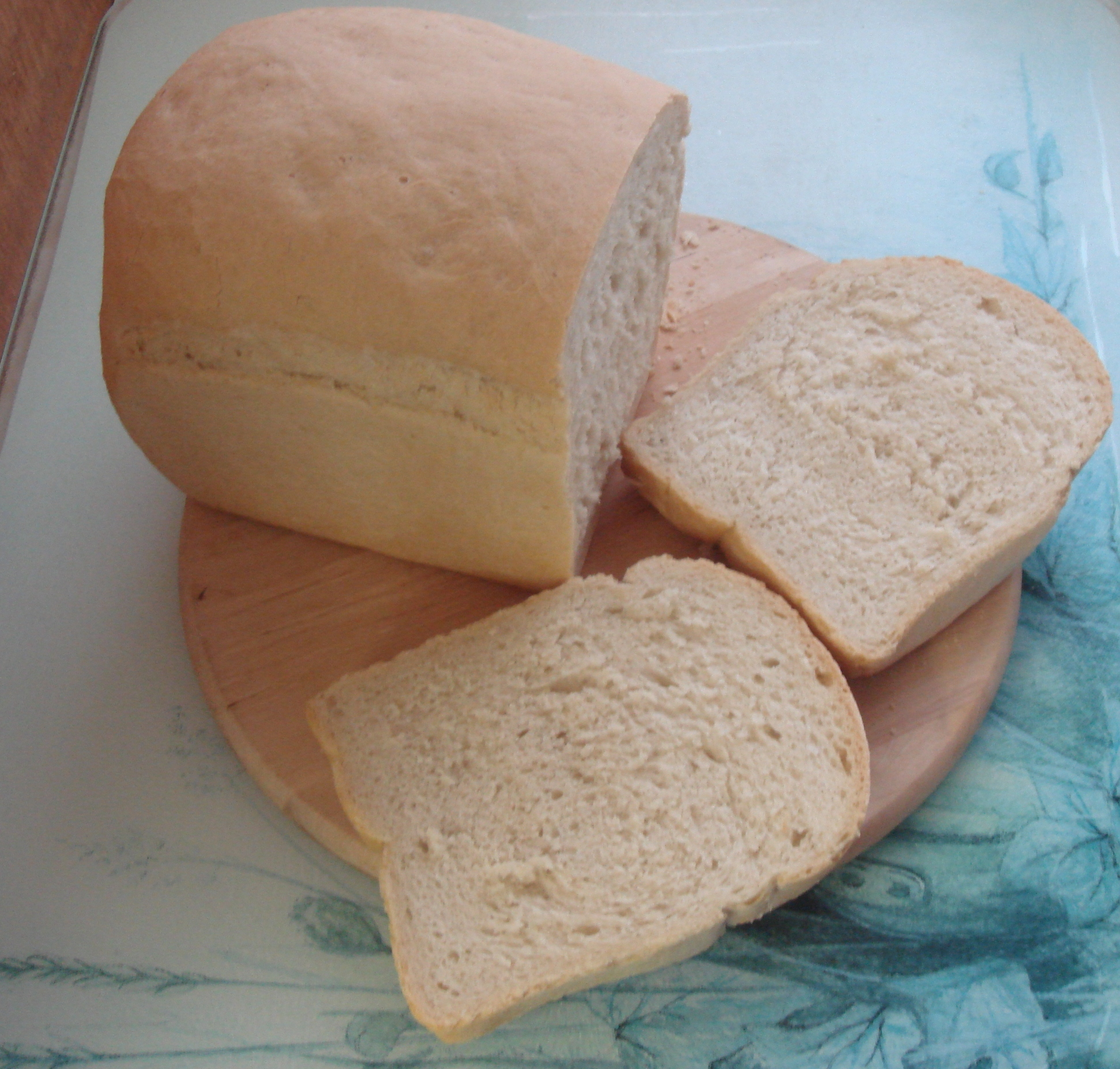
Homemade white bread

In the United States, consumers sometimes refer to white bread as "sandwich bread" or "sandwich loaf". It is often perceived as an unhealthy, bland, and unsophisticated menu item.

Japanese milk bread, a type of soft white bread, is popular in Asia, particularly in Japan, and has artisan status there. Bread was not a traditional food in Japan, but it came into culinary use there after the American response to post-World War II Japanese rice shortages included relief shipments of wheat. The style of bread became popular outside Asia in the 2020s.

== Fortification ==
While a bran- and wheatgerm-discarding milling process can help improve white flour's shelf life, it does remove nutrients like some dietary fiber, iron, B vitamins, micronutrients and essential fatty acids. The US government has mandated since 1941 fortification of white flour-based foods with some of the nutrients lost in milling, like thiamin, riboflavin, niacin, and iron. This mandate came about in response to the vast nutrient deficiencies seen in US military recruits at the start of World War II. This fortification led to nearly universal eradication of deficiency diseases in the US, such as pellagra and beriberi (deficiencies of niacin and thiamine, respectively) and white bread continues to contain these added vitamins to this day.

Folic acid is another nutrient that some governments have mandated is added to enriched grains like white bread. In the US and Canada, these grains have been fortified with mandatory levels of folic acid since 1998 because of its important role in preventing birth defects. Since fortification began, the rate of neural tube defects has decreased by approximately one-third in the US. Folic acid supplementation was mandated in the UK in September 2021, joining more than 80 countries in the world with this public health measure.

== See also ==
- Brown bread, a whole grain bread sometimes made with molasses or coffee
- Chorleywood bread process, another common process for mass-produced bread
- Flour treatment agent
- Graham bread, an early reintroduction of an unbleached bread
- Maida flour, a bleached flour typically used to make a white bread in India
- Plain loaf
- Pullman loaf, bread baked in a lidded pan, responsible for square-shaped slices
- Rye bread, a bread that can be darker or neutral in color
- Sliced bread, pre-sliced and packaged bread, first sold in 1928
- Vienna bread, baking processes that lead to lighter, less sour breads
- Ultra-processed food
- Whole wheat bread, one common alternative to white bread
- Wonder Bread
