= Tangzhong =

Technique of making yeast dough

- Traditional Chinese: 湯種
- Simplified Chinese: 汤种
- Literal meaning: hot water seed
Transcriptions
Standard Mandarin
- Hanyu Pinyin: tāngzhǒng
- Bopomofo: ㄊㄤ ㄓㄨㄥˇ
Yue: Cantonese
- Yale Romanization: tōng júng
- Jyutping: tong¹ zung²

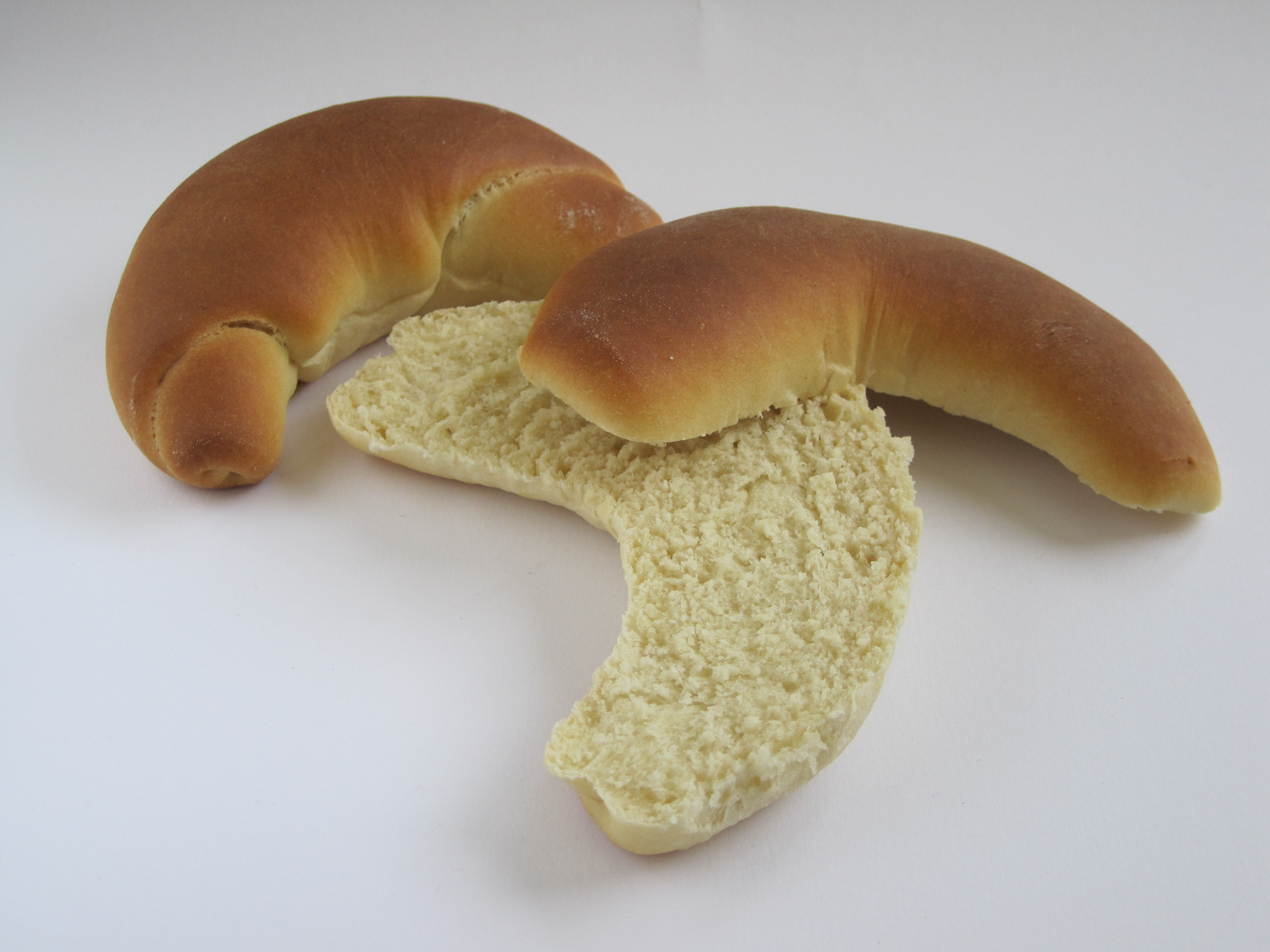
Milk bread made with a water roux

Tangzhong (Chinese: 湯種; pinyin: tāngzhǒng; [tʰáŋʈʂʊ̌ŋ]), also known as a water roux or yu-dane (Japanese: 湯種, romanized: yu-dane; [jɯ̟da̠ne̞]) is a paste of flour cooked in water or milk to over 65 °C (149 °F) which is used to improve the texture of bread and increase the amount of time it takes to stale.

Tangzhong is a gel, which helps stabilize the wheat starches in the bread, to prevent recrystallization which is the main cause of staling. The Chinese characters for the technique translate to "hot water seed".

== Technique ==
For yu-dane the flour is mixed with an equal weight of boiling water poured over it. This mixture then holds moisture so that, when it is added to a bread mix, the dough bakes with a soft, fluffy texture and the bread then keeps for longer.

For tangzhong the flour is cooked at 65 °C (149 °F) in the liquid which causes its starch to gelatinize. The gelatinized roux is generally used at a moderate temperature and apparently also contributes to slightly greater rise during baking.

The gelatinized flour is more stable than normal bread dough, which normally tends to crystallize, creating stale bread. Because the water roux blocks that process, the bread keeps for longer.

== History ==
"Scalding" flour, especially rye flour, for baking is a technique that has been used for centuries and is traditional in China to make steamed buns. The technique was used to develop Japanese milk bread in the 20th century.

The Pasco Shikishima Corporation (Japanese: 敷島製パン) was granted a patent in Japan for making bread using the yu-dane method in 2001. The yu-dane method was then modified by Taiwanese pastry chef Yvonne Chen (Chinese: 陳郁芬), who published a book in 2007 called 65°C Bread Doctor (Chinese: 65°C 湯種麵包), borrowing the Japanese term 湯種 directly. This book popularized the technique throughout Asia.

In 2010, food author Christine Ho first wrote about the technique in English, using the Mandarin pronunciation of 湯種, tangzhong ([tʰáŋ.ʈʂʊ̀ŋ]). She subsequently wrote more than twenty recipes using the method, which helped popularize the technique in the English-speaking world.

== See also ==
- Roux
