= Azodicarbonamide =

Industrial and food chemical

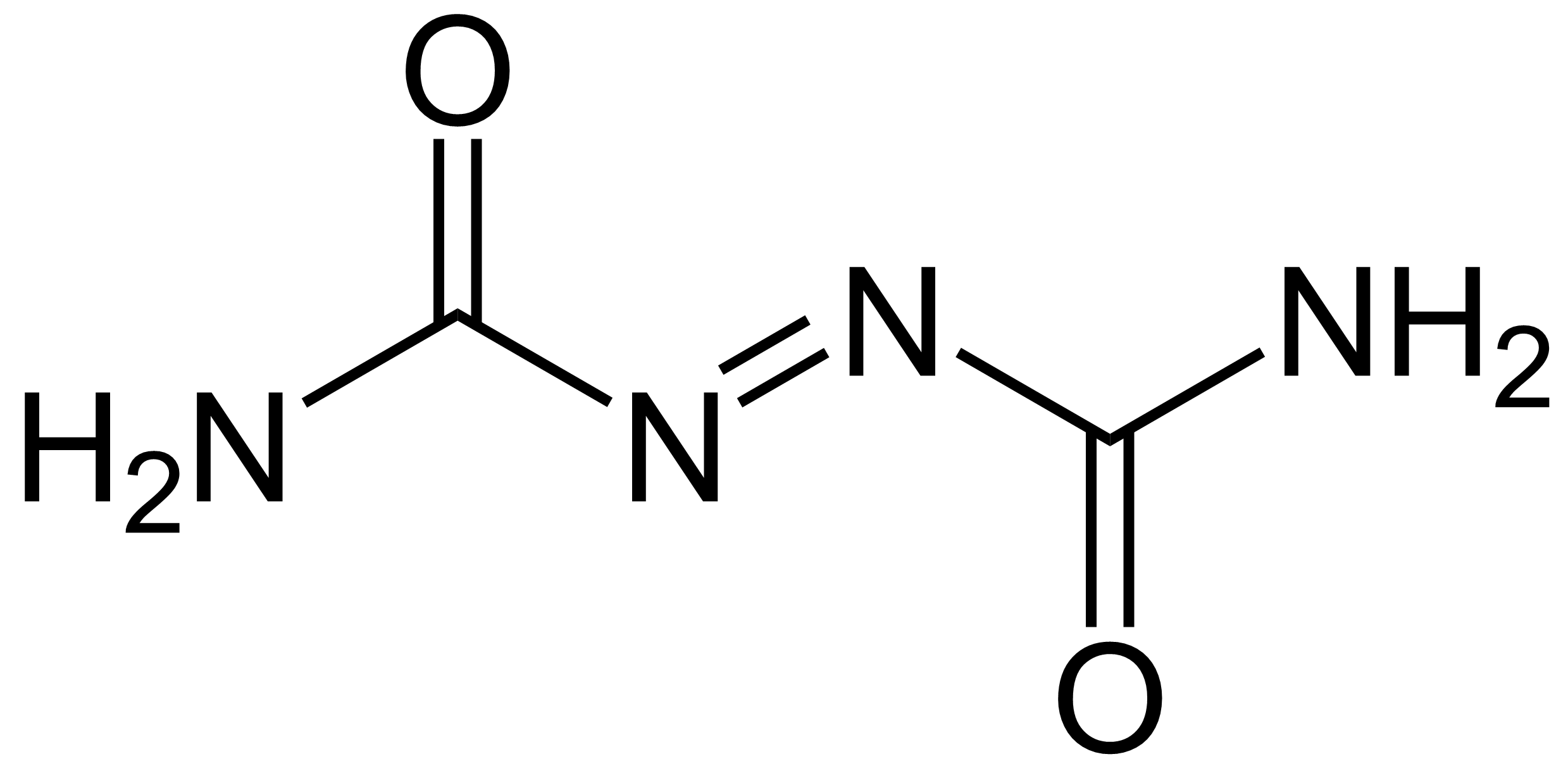

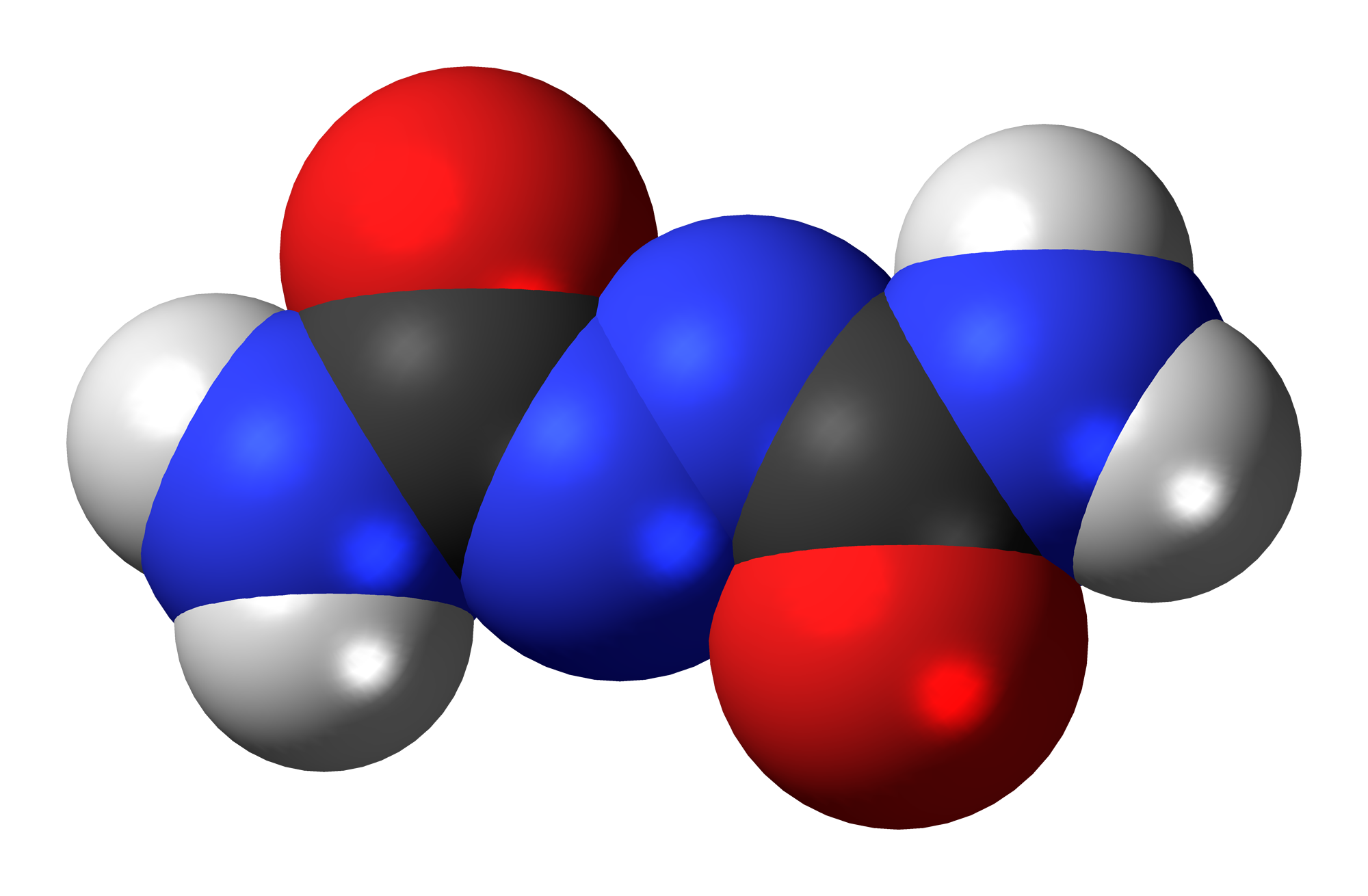

Names
- IUPAC name Carbamoyliminourea
- Other names: Azodicarboxamide; Azobisformamide; C,C'-Azodi(formamide); Diazenedicarboxamide; Ayngaroxamide

Identifiers
CAS Number	123-77-3
3D model (JSmol)	Interactive image
ChEMBL	ChEMBL28517
ChemSpider	4575589
ECHA InfoCard	100.004.229
EC Number	204-650-8
E number	E927a (glazing agents, ...)
PubChem CID	31269
UNII	56Z28B9C8O
CompTox Dashboard (EPA)	DTXSID0024553
- InChI: InChI=1S/C2H4N4O2/c3-1(7)5-6-2(4)8/h(H2,3,7)(H2,4,8)/b6-5+ Key: XOZUGNYVDXMRKW-AATRIKPKSA-N; InChI=1/C2H4N4O2/c3-1(7)5-6-2(4)8/h(H2,3,7)(H2,4,8)/b6-5+ Key: XOZUGNYVDXMRKW-AATRIKPKBW
- SMILES: O=C(/N=N/C(=O)N)N

Properties
Chemical formula	C_{2}H_{4}N_{4}O_{2}
Molar mass	116.080 g·mol^{−1}
Appearance	Yellow to orange/red crystalline powder
Melting point	225 °C (437 °F; 498 K) (decomposes)

Hazards
- Occupational safety and health (OHS/OSH)
Main hazards	oxidizer
- GHS labelling
Pictograms	(GHS08: Health hazard)
Signal word	Danger
Hazard statements	H242, H331, H334
NFPA 704 (fire diamond)	1 1 0
- Safety data sheet (SDS)
- Except where otherwise noted, data are given for materials in their standard state (at 25 °C [77 °F], 100 kPa). verify (what is ?) Infobox references

Azodicarbonamide, ADCA, ACA, ADA, or azo(bis)formamide, is a chemical compound with the molecular formula C_{2}H_{4}O_{2}N_{4}. It is a yellow to orange-red, odorless, crystalline powder. It is sometimes called "the yoga mat chemical" because of widespread use in foamed plastics. It was first described by John Bryden in 1959.

== Synthesis ==
It is prepared in two steps via treatment of urea with hydrazine to form biurea, as described in this idealized equation:

2 O=C(NH_{2})_{2} + H_{2}N−NH_{2} → H_{2}N−C(=O)−NH−NH−C(=O)−NH_{2} + 2 NH_{3}

Oxidation of biurea with gaseous chlorine yields azodicarbonamide:

H_{2}N−C(=O)−NH−NH−C(=O)−NH_{2} + Cl_{2} → H_{2}N−C(=O)−N=N−C(=O)−NH_{2} + 2 HCl

== Applications ==
=== Blowing agent ===
The principal use of azodicarbonamide is in the production of foamed plastics as a blowing agent. The thermal decomposition of azodicarbonamide produces nitrogen, carbon monoxide, carbon dioxide, and ammonia gases, which are trapped in the polymer as bubbles to form a foamed article.

Azodicarbonamide is used in plastics, synthetic leather, and other industries and can be pure or modified. Modification affects the reaction temperatures. Pure azodicarbonamide generally reacts around 200 °C. In the plastic, leather, and other industries, modified azodicarbonamide (average decomposition temperature 170 °C) contains additives that accelerate the reaction or react at lower temperatures.

An example of the use of azodicarbonamide as a blowing agent is found in the manufacture of vinyl (PVC) and EVA-PE foams, where it forms bubbles upon breaking down into gas at high temperature. Vinyl foam is springy and does not slip on smooth surfaces. It is useful for carpet underlay and floor mats. Commercial yoga mats made of vinyl foam have been available since the 1980s; the first mats were cut from carpet underlay.

=== Food additive ===
As a food additive, azodicarbonamide is used as a flour bleaching agent and a dough conditioner in some countries such as the US and Canada (up to 45 ppm), but not in the European Union. It reacts with moist flour as an oxidizing agent. The main reaction product is biurea, which is stable during baking. Secondary reaction products include semicarbazide (aminourea) and ethyl carbamate (urethane). It is known by the E number E927. Many restaurants in the US fast food industry removed E927 from foodstuffs in response to negative publicity.

== Safety and regulation ==
=== Occupational (inhalation) ===
In a 1999 report, the World Health Organization has linked exposure to azodicarbonamide at workplaces where it is manufactured or handled in raw form to "respiratory issues, allergies and asthma". The available data are restricted to these occupational environments. Exposure of the general public to azodicarbonamide could not be evaluated because of the lack of available data. The WHO concluded, "The level of risk is uncertain; hence, exposure levels should be reduced as much as possible".

In the UK, the Health and Safety Executive has identified azodicarbonamide as a respiratory sensitizer (a possible cause of asthma) in workplace settings and determined that containers of it should be labeled with "May cause sensitisation by inhalation." Azodicarbonamide was added to the REACH Regulation candidate Substances of Very High Concern list in 2012, for its respiratory sensitizing properties.

=== Food (ingestion) ===
In jurisdictions such as Australia and the European Union, azodicarbonamide as a food additive is banned. Azodicarbonamide as a blowing agent in plastics was banned in the EU in August 2005 in plastic articles that are intended to come into direct contact with food. In the United States, azodicarbonamide is generally recognized as safe (GRAS) and is allowed to be added to flour at levels up to 45 ppm. However, use in products intended for human consumption is in decline under pressure of the public opinion. In 2014, amid public discomfort with the dual uses of azodicarbonamide, Subway and Wendy's announced that they would no longer use it as a dough conditioner. As of February 2014, the Center for Science in the Public Interest stated azodicarbonamide "has been poorly tested" and advocated for reducing the amount of azodicarbonamide used in food.

Banning ADA in food is motivated by studies of semicarbazide (aminourea) - a breakdown product of ADA that shows "weak carcinogenic activity in laboratory animals", but data is inconclusive in humans. The EU banned ADA in food containers despite an EFSA report considering such exposure "not a concern" due to low levels produced. The FDA considers ADA to be safe in permissible concentrations.
