= Otto Frederick Rohwedder =

Inventor of sliced bread (1880–1960)

- Born: July 28, 1880; Davenport, Iowa, United States
- Died: November 8, 1960 (aged 80); Concord, Michigan, United States
- Occupations: Inventor, engineer
- Spouse: Carrie S. Johnson (m. 1905–1955)
- Children: 2

Otto Frederick Rohwedder (July 7, 1880 – November 8, 1960) was an American inventor and engineer who created the first automatic bread-slicing machine for commercial use. It was first used by the Chillicothe Missouri Baking Company.

== Early life and education ==
Rohwedder was born in Des Moines, Iowa, on July 7, 1880, the son of Claus and Margaret Rohwedder, of ethnic German descent. He was the second youngest of four brothers and a sister.

Rohwedder and his family lived in Davenport, where he attended Davenport public schools. He then became an apprentice to a jeweler to learn a trade.

Rohwedder also studied optometry, graduating in 1900 with a degree in optics from what is now the Illinois College of Optometry in Chicago. He became a jeweler.

== Marriage and family ==
Rohwedder married Carrie S. Johnson in 1905. They settled in St. Joseph, Missouri, and had two children, Margaret and Richard. Carrie died in 1955.

== Career ==
Rohwedder first had a brief career as a jeweler, and became the owner of three jewelry stores in St. Joseph, Missouri. He used his work with watches and jewelry to invent new machines. Convinced he could develop a bread slicing machine, he sold his jewelry stores to fund the development effort and manufacture the machines. In 1917 a fire broke out at the factory where Rohwedder was manufacturing his machine. It destroyed his prototype and blueprints. With the need to get funding again, Rohwedder was delayed for several years in bringing the bread slicer to market.

In 1927 Rohwedder successfully designed a machine that not only sliced the bread but wrapped it. He applied for patents to protect his invention and sold the first machine to a friend and baker Frank Bench, who installed it at the Chillicothe Baking Company, in Chillicothe, Missouri, in 1928. The first loaf of sliced bread was sold commercially on July 7, 1928. Sales of the machine to other bakeries increased and sliced bread became available across the country.

Gustav Papendick, a baker in St. Louis, bought Rohwedder's second machine and found he could improve on it. He developed a better way to have the machine wrap and keep bread fresh. He also applied for patents for his concepts.

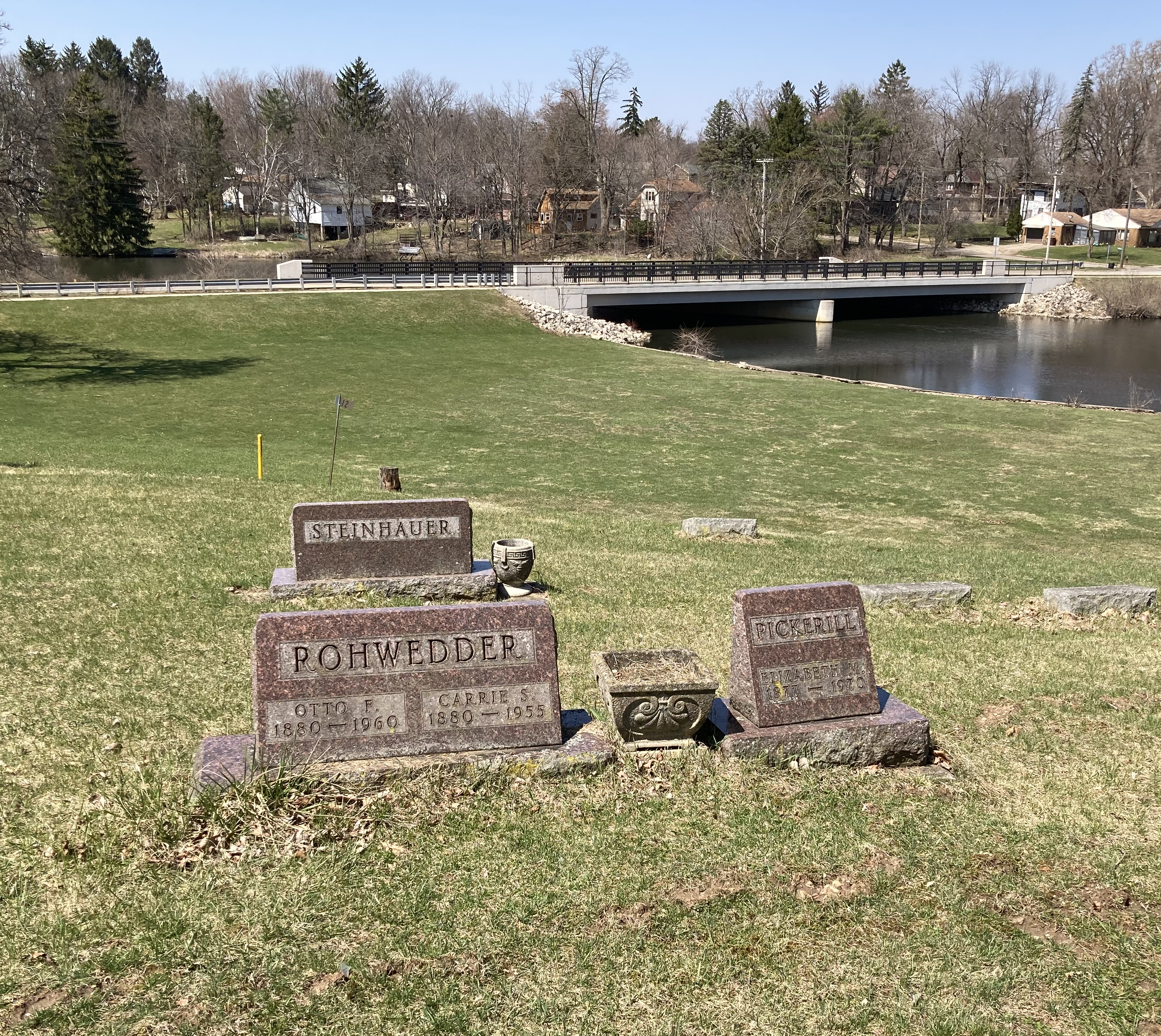
Rohwedder's grave at Riverside Cemetery

In 1930 Continental Baking Company introduced Wonder Bread as a sliced bread. It was followed by other major companies when they saw how the bread was received. By 1932 the availability of standardized slices had boosted sales of automatic, pop-up toasters, an invention of 1926 by Charles Strite. In 1933 American bakeries for the first time produced more sliced than unsliced bread loaves.

That same year Rohwedder sold his patent rights to the Micro-Westco Co. of Bettendorf, Iowa, and joined the company. He became vice-president and sales manager of the Rohwedder Bakery Machine Division.

In 1951, Rohwedder, at age 71, retired from Micro-Westco Co. and moved with his wife Carrie to Albion, Michigan, where their daughter Margaret (Rohwedder) Steinhauer and his sister Elizabeth Pickerill lived. Rohwedder died in Concord, Michigan, on November 8, 1960. He was buried at Riverside Cemetery in Albion.

== Honors and legacy ==
- Rohwedder had seven patents approved from 1927–1936 having to do with bread slicing and handling.
- His original bread-slicing machine is in the Smithsonian Institution in Washington, D.C.
