= Biurea =

Names
- Preferred IUPAC name Hydrazine-1,2-dicarboxamide
- Systematic IUPAC name (Carbamoylamino)urea
- Other names: Bicarbamamide; Bicarbamimidic acid; Biscarbamoylhydrazine; Carbamoylsemicarbazide; Hydrazinedicarboxamide; Ureidourea

Identifiers
CAS Number	110-21-4
3D model (JSmol)	Interactive image
ChemSpider	7748
ECHA InfoCard	100.003.408
EC Number	203-747-2
PubChem CID	8039
UNII	POJ4UOY01H
CompTox Dashboard (EPA)	DTXSID6024628
- InChI: InChI=1S/C2H6N4O2/c3-1(7)5-6-2(4)8/h(H3,3,5,7)(H3,4,6,8) Key: ULUZGMIUTMRARO-UHFFFAOYSA-N
- SMILES: NC(=O)NNC(N)=O

Properties
Chemical formula	C_{2}H_{6}N_{4}O_{2}
Molar mass	118.096 g·mol^{−1}
Appearance	White crystals

Thermochemistry
Std enthalpy of formation (Δ_{f}H^{⦵}_{298})	−499.9–−497.5 kJ mol^{−1}
Std enthalpy of combustion (Δ_{c}H^{⦵}_{298})	−1.1471–−1.1447 MJ mol^{−1}

Related compounds
Related compounds	1,2-Dimethylhydrazine; Daminozide
- Except where otherwise noted, data are given for materials in their standard state (at 25 °C [77 °F], 100 kPa). Infobox references

Biurea is a chemical compound with the molecular formula C_{2}H_{6}N_{4}O_{2}. It is produced in food products containing azodicarbonamide, a common ingredient in bread flour, when they are cooked. Upon exposure, biurea is rapidly eliminated from the body through excretion.

Biurea is produced from urea and hydrazine by transamidation. Its major use is as a chemical intermediate in the production of azodicarbonamide, a common blowing agent.
