= Sliced bread =

Loaf of bread pre-sliced with a machine

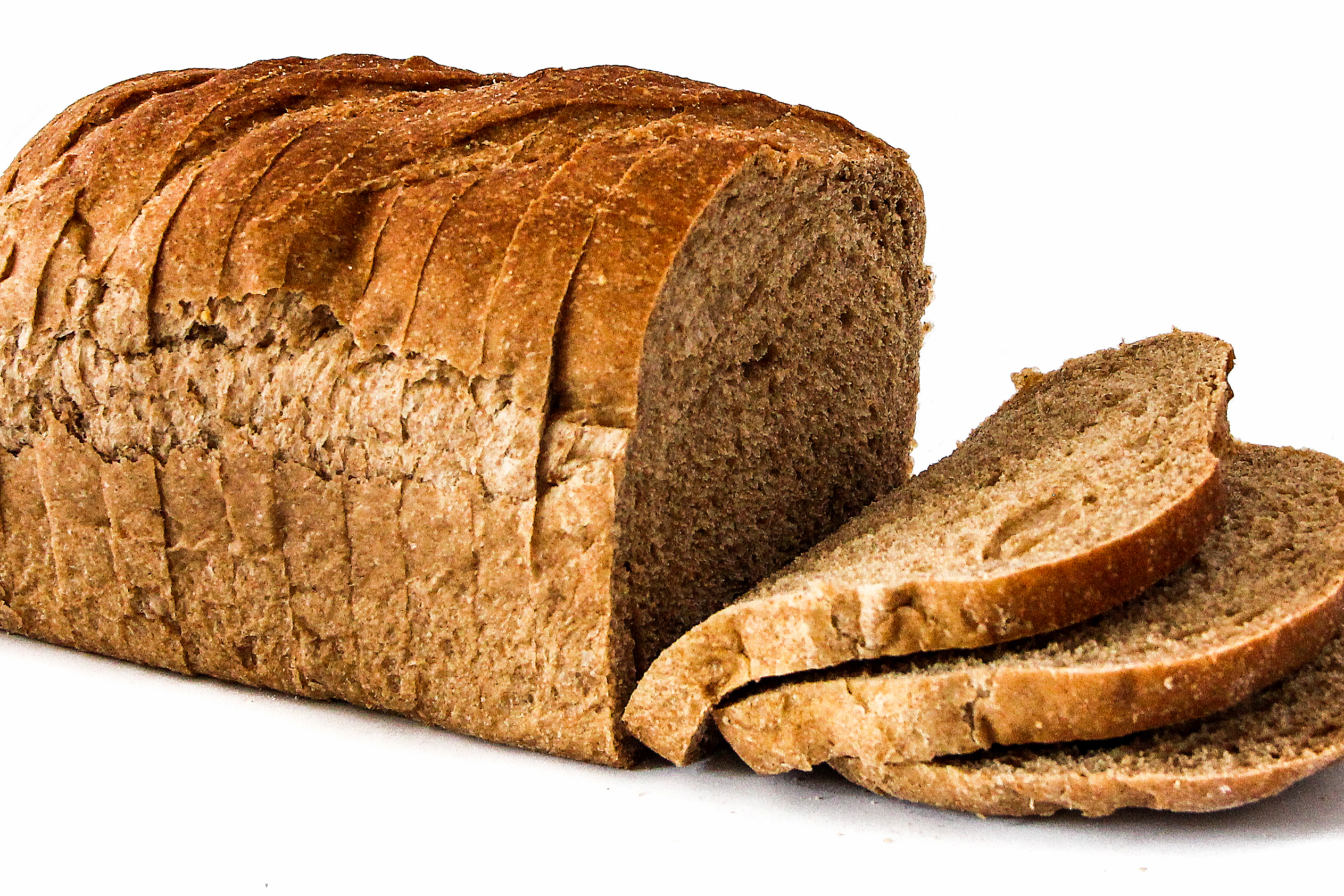
- A loaf of brown bread sliced to uniform thickness by a bread slicing machine
- Type: Bread
- Main ingredients: bread
- Variations: slice, roll
- Food energy (per 1 slice serving): 90 kcal (380 kJ)

Sliced bread is a loaf of bread, sliced with a machine and packaged for convenience, as opposed to the consumer cutting it with a knife. It was first sold in 1928, advertised as "the greatest forward step in the baking industry since bread was wrapped". By 1933, around 80% of bread sold in the US was pre-sliced, leading to the popular idiom "greatest thing since sliced bread".

== History ==
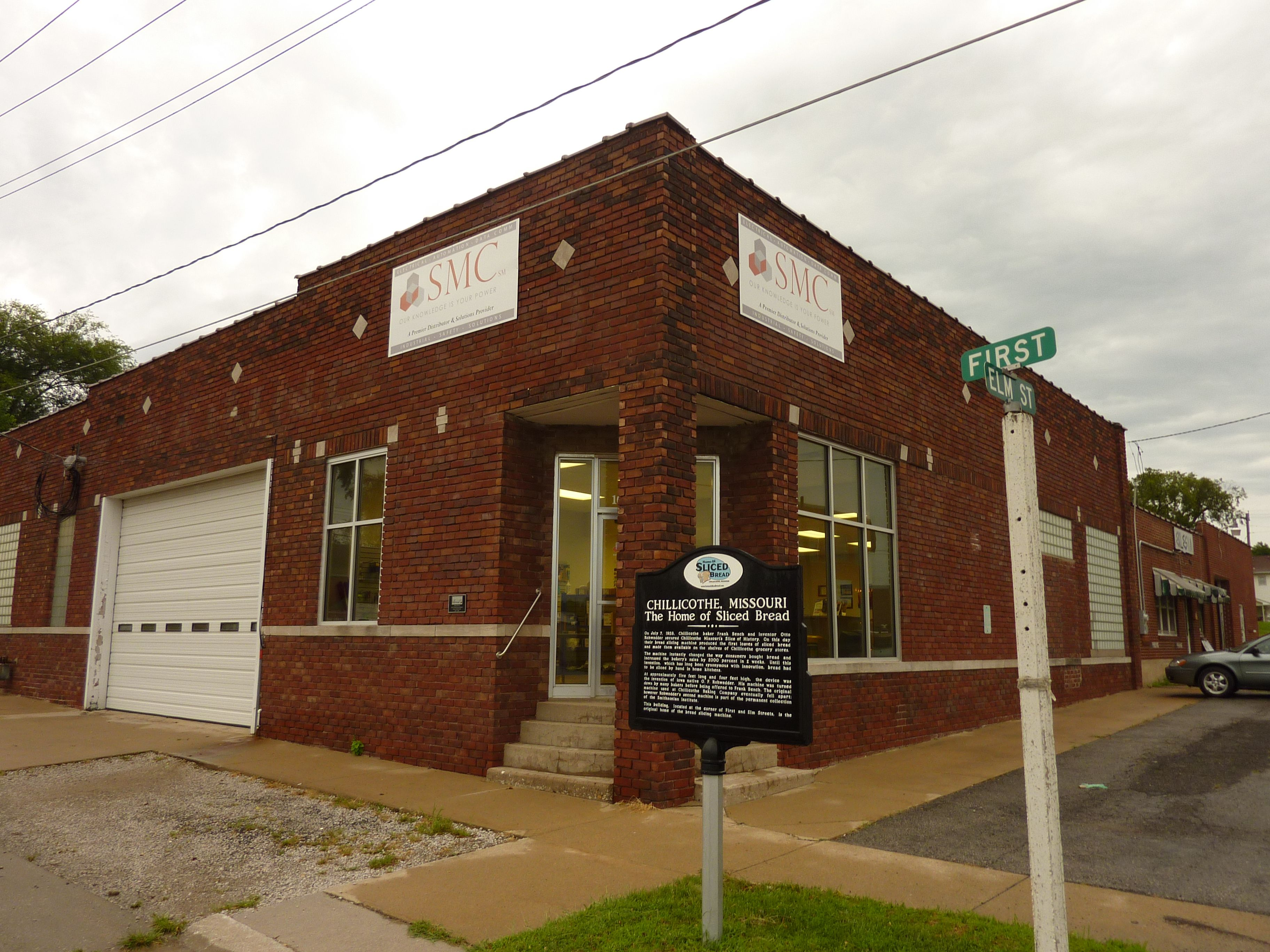
Chillicothe Baking Company's building in Chillicothe, Missouri, where the first machine-sliced bread was set for sale.

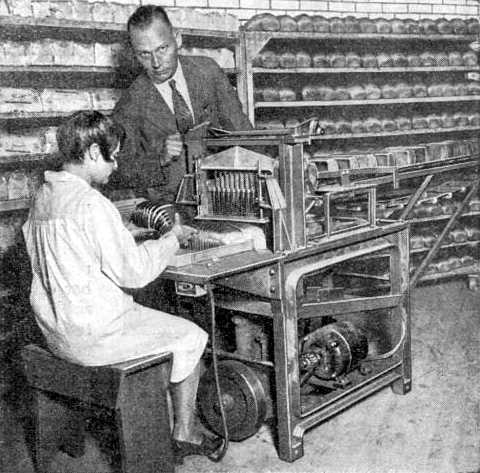
This photograph depicts a "new electrical bread slicing machine" in use by an unnamed bakery in St. Louis in 1930, and may well show Rohwedder's machine in use by the Papendick Bakery Company.

The multiple cutting bands in Rohwedder's 1928 slicer are shown in this diagram from his patent.

Otto Frederick Rohwedder of Davenport, Iowa, United States, invented the first single loaf bread-slicing machine. A prototype he built in 1912 was destroyed in a fire, and it was not until 1928 that Rohwedder had a fully working machine ready. The first commercial use of the machine was by the Chillicothe Baking Company of Chillicothe, Missouri, who sold their first slices on July 7, 1928. Their product, "Kleen Maid Sliced Bread", proved to be a success. Battle Creek, Michigan, has a competing claim as the first city to sell bread sliced by Rohwedder's machine; however, historians have produced no documentation backing up Battle Creek's claim. The bread was advertised as "the greatest forward step in the baking industry since bread was wrapped".

St. Louis baker Gustav Papendick bought Rohwedder's second bread slicer and set out to improve it by devising a way to keep the slices together at least long enough to allow the loaves to be wrapped. After failures trying rubber bands and metal pins, he settled on placing the slices into a cardboard tray. The tray aligned the slices, allowing mechanized wrapping machines to function.

W.E. Long, who promoted the Holsum Bread brand, used by various independent bakers around the country, pioneered and promoted the packaging of sliced bread, beginning in 1928. In 1930, Wonder Bread, first sold in 1925, started marketing sliced bread nationwide.

In the United Kingdom, the first slicing and wrapping machine was installed in the Wonderloaf Bakery in Tottenham, London, in 1937. By the 1950s around 80% of bread sold in Britain was pre-sliced.

== Effects ==
As commercially sliced bread resulted in uniform and somewhat thinner slices, people ate more slices of bread at a time. They also ate bread more frequently, because of the ease of getting and eating another piece of bread. This increased consumption of bread and, in turn, increased consumption of spreads, such as jam, to put on the bread.

== 1943 U.S. ban ==
In 1943, U.S. officials imposed a short-lived ban on sliced bread as a wartime conservation measure. The ban was ordered by Secretary of Agriculture Claude R. Wickard, who held the position of Food Administrator, and took effect on January 18, 1943. According to The New York Times, officials explained that "the ready-sliced loaf must have a heavier wrapping than an unsliced one if it is not to dry out." It was also intended to counteract a rise in the price of bread, caused by the Office of Price Administration's authorization of a ten percent increase in flour prices.

In a Sunday radio address on January 24th, New York City Mayor Fiorello La Guardia suggested that bakeries that had their own bread-slicing machines should be allowed to continue to use them, and on January 26th, 1943, a letter appeared in The New York Times from a distraught housewife:

I should like to let you know how important sliced bread is to the morale and saneness of a household. My husband and four children are all in a rush during and after breakfast. Without ready-sliced bread I must do the slicing for toast—two pieces for each one—that's ten. For their lunches I must cut by hand at least twenty slices, for two sandwiches apiece. Afterward I make my own toast. Twenty-two slices of bread to be cut in a hurry!

On January 26th, however, John F. Conaboy, the New York Area Supervisor of the Food Distribution Administration, warned bakeries, delicatessens, and other stores that were continuing to slice bread to stop, saying that "to protect the cooperating bakeries against the unfair competition of those who continue to slice their own bread... we are prepared to take stern measures if necessary."

On March 8th, 1943, the ban was rescinded. While public outcry is generally credited for the reversal, Wickard stated that "Our experience with the order, however, leads us to believe that the savings are not as much as we expected, and the War Production Board tells us that sufficient wax paper to wrap sliced bread for four months is in the hands of paper processor and the baking industry."

== Around the world ==
Due to its convenience, sliced bread is popular in many parts of the world, and the usual thickness varies by company and country:

- In the United Kingdom, sliced bread is sold as "Extra Thick", "Thick", "Medium" or "Thin", ranging from 16 mm down to 10 mm.
- In Ireland, the most popular bread type is known as "sliced pan", sold in 800- or 400-gram loaves, wrapped in wax paper.
- In Japan, the same half-loaf of bread is labeled by the number of slices it is cut into (commonly a four or six cut, but also eight or ten), meaning a higher number is a thinner cut. Whole cut loaves are rarely seen. Thin sliced crustless "sandwich bread" is also sold in Japan, since regular four–six slice bread is deemed too thick.
- In Canada and the United States, Texas toast is a type of packaged bread sliced twice as thick as most sliced bread.
- In Australia most sliced bread slices are about 18 mm thick, known as "toast" thickness, while 12–13 mm is known as "sandwich". Less common is "café" thickness, about 24 mm.

== In popular culture ==
The phrase "the greatest thing since sliced bread" is a common idiom used to praise an invention or development. A writer for The Kansas City Star wrote that "the phrase is the ultimate depiction of innovative achievement and American know-how."

In 1933, an advertisement for a bread offering thick and thin slices in the same loaf called it "the first improvement since sliced bread". In 1940, a package of bread consisting of two wrapped sliced half-loaves was advertised as the "greatest convenience since sliced bread".

== See also ==
- Pullman loaf, origin of a style of long narrow bread pan, and the loaves baked in it
