= Pullman loaf =

Type of bread

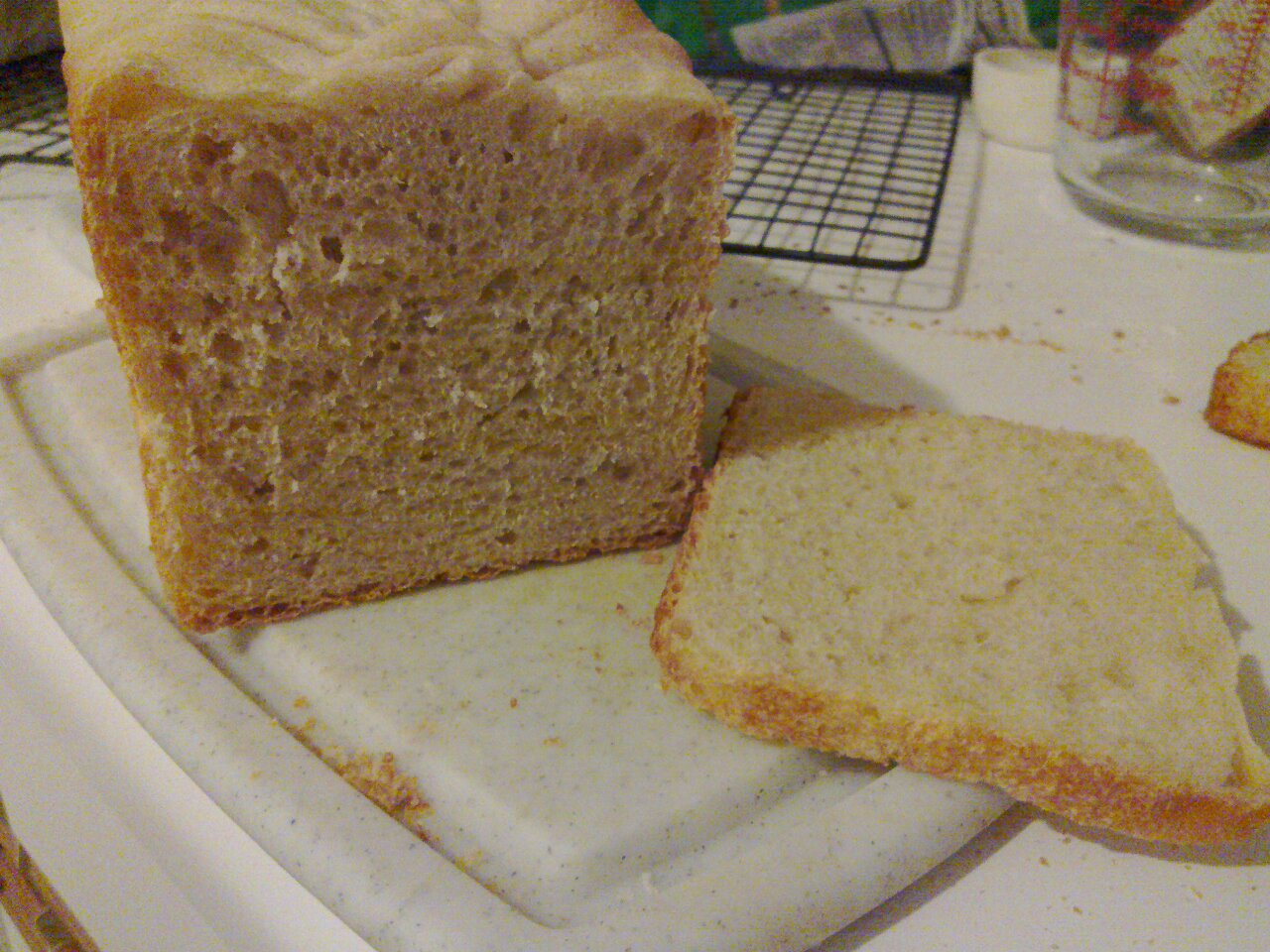
- Sourdough Pullman loaf
- Type: Bread
- Place of origin: United Kingdom; United States
- Main ingredients: Flour

The Pullman loaf, sometimes called the "sandwich loaf", is a rectangular loaf of white bread baked in a long, narrow, lidded pan. The French term for this style of loaf is pain de mie, or, less commonly, pain anglais.

European breadmakers began using square lidded pans in the early 19th century to minimize crust. Railway service pioneer George Pullman chose the loaf for use on his Pullman railcars for efficiency reasons. Three Pullman loaves occupied the same space as two standard round-topped loaves, thus maximizing the use of space in the small Pullman kitchen.

== See also ==
- Bread pan
- Sandwich bread
- Sliced bread, with the whole loaf of bread sliced at once by machine, first used in 1928
