= Oxalyldihydrazide =

Names
- Preferred IUPAC name Oxalohydrazide

Identifiers
CAS Number	996-98-5
3D model (JSmol)	Interactive image
ChemSpider	13226
ECHA InfoCard	100.012.400
EC Number	213-640-2
PubChem CID	13826
UNII	9ZG676L978
CompTox Dashboard (EPA)	DTXSID20870823
- InChI: Key: OKISUZLXOYGIFP-UHFFFAOYSA-N; InChI=1S/C2H6N4O2/c3-5-1(7)2(8)6-4/h3-4H2,(H,5,7)(H,6,8) Key: OKISUZLXOYGIFP-UHFFFAOYAC
- SMILES: C(=O)(C(=O)NN)NN

Properties
Chemical formula	C_{2}H_{6}N_{4}O_{2}
Molar mass	118.096 g·mol^{−1}
Melting point	242–244 °C (468–471 °F; 515–517 K)
- Except where otherwise noted, data are given for materials in their standard state (at 25 °C [77 °F], 100 kPa). verify (what is ?) Infobox references

Oxalyldihydrazide is an organic compound with the formula of NH_{2}NHCOCONHNH_{2}. Oxalyldihydrazide can act as a ligand on some divalent first row transition metals like manganese, iron, cobalt, nickel, copper or zinc. Oxalyldihydrazide is a colorless or white solid that is poorly soluble in cold water and insoluble in most organic solvents.

== Synthesis ==
Oxalyldihydrazide can be prepared by the reaction of hydrazine hydrate with an oxalate ester in alcoholic solution at room temperature.

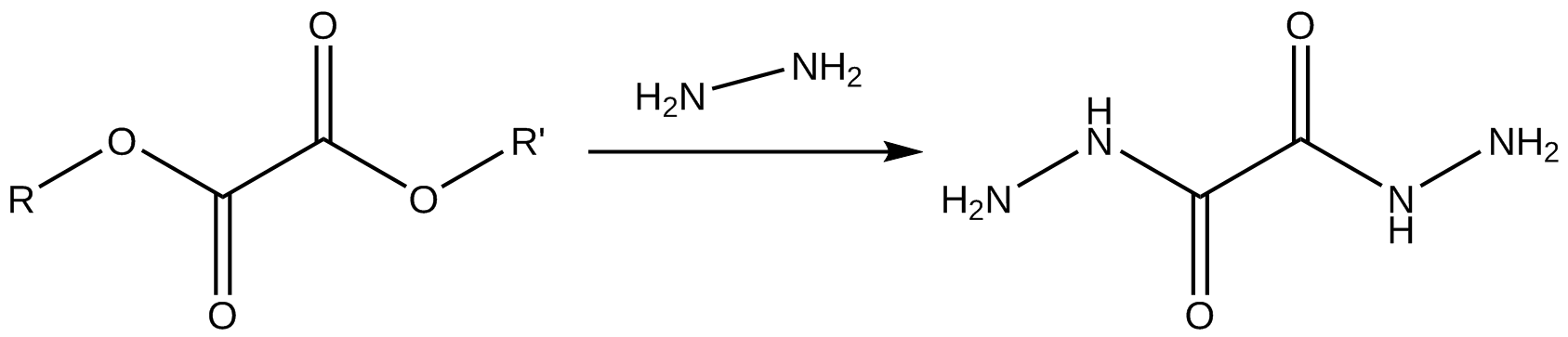
