= Dough conditioner =

Substance added to bread dough to strengthen its texture

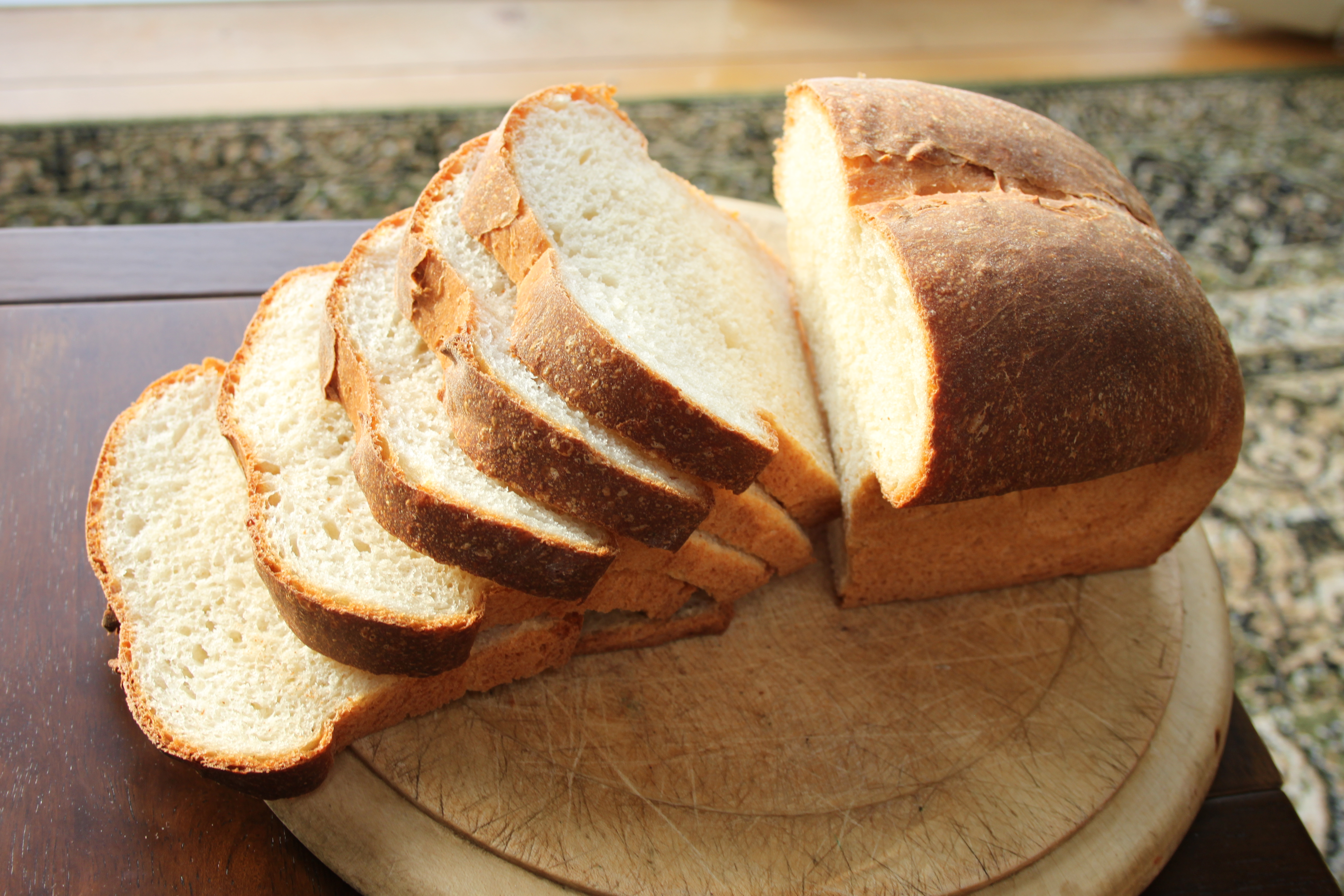
A sliced loaf of white bread.

A dough conditioner (also called a flour treatment agent, improving agent or bread improver) is any substance added to bread dough to strengthen its texture or otherwise improve it in some way. Dough conditioners may include enzymes, yeast nutrients, mineral salts, oxidants and reductants, bleaching agents and emulsifiers. Flour treatment agents are used to increase the speed of dough rising and to improve the strength and workability of the dough.

== Examples ==
Examples of dough conditioners include ascorbic acid, distilled monoglycerides, citrate ester of monoglycerides, diglycerides, ammonium chloride, enzymes, diacetyl tartaric acid ester of monoglycerides or DATEM, potassium bromate, potassium iodate, calcium salts such as calcium iodate, L-cystine, L-cysteine HCl, glycerol monostearate, azodicarbonamide, sodium stearoyl lactylate, sucrose palmitate or other sucrose esters, polyoxyethylene sorbitan monostearate or polysorbate, soybean lecithin, and soybean lecithin enriched with lysophospholipids.

Less processed dough conditioners include sprouted- or malted-grain flours, soy, milk, wheat germ, eggs, potatoes, gluten, yeast, and extra kneading. Malted, diastatic flours are not typically added by manufacturers to whole-wheat flours.

== History ==
In the early 1900s it was discovered that a mixture containing calcium chloride, ammonium sulfate, and potassium bromate halved the amount of yeast needed to raise dough. These mixtures were generally known as mineral yeast foods or yeast nutrient salts. After they became popular among bakers, one patented yeast food was analyzed by Connecticut Agricultural Experiment Station chief chemist J. P. Street, who published in 1917 that it contained, "calcium sulphate, 25; ammonium chlorid, 9.7; potassium bromate, 0.3; sodium chlorid, 25; patent wheat flour, 40." They contain water conditioners, yeast conditioners, and dough conditioners.

== Yeast nutrients ==
Yeast requires water, carbon sources such as starch and simple carbohydrates, nitrogen (preferably as ammonium as it cannot assimilate nitrate), sulfur, phosphorus (often as inorganic phosphate), and minute quantities of vitamins and elemental mineral ions. Ammonium chloride, ammonium sulfate, or ammonium phosphate may be used as sources of nitrogen. Phosphoric acid, an acidulant normally used in cola, is used as a yeast stimulant. Calcium iodate, an oxidant, is a U.S. Food and Drug Administration generally recognized as safe source of calcium and iodide.

== Oxidants and reductants ==
Oxidizing agents are added to flour to help with gluten development. They may or may not also act as bleaching agents. Originally flour was naturally aged through exposure to the atmosphere. Oxidizing agents primarily affect sulfur-containing amino acids, ultimately helping to form disulfide bridges between the gluten molecules. The addition of these agents to flour will create a stronger dough. Dehydroascorbic acid and potassium bromate are oxidants, acting on sulfhydryl groups and disulfide bonds in wheat dough, in particular oxidizing glutathione. Potassium bromate acts more directly or with fewer chemical conversion steps than ascorbic acid. Glutathione increases wheat dough's extensibility, or relaxes it, while oxidizing a dough's glutathione increases elasticity. Common oxidizing agents are:

- ascorbic acid (as a precursor to the oxidant known as dehydroascorbic acid)
- azodicarbonamide (E927)
- potassium bromate (E924, the component which gives bromated flour its name, is banned in some countries and states)
- potassium iodate

Reducing agents help to weaken the flour by breaking the protein network. This will help with various aspects of handling a strong dough. The benefits of adding these agents are reduced mixing time, reduced dough elasticity, reduced proofing time, and improved machinability. Cysteine and bisulfite (Note: Sodium metabisulfite has been used in the cracker industry as a rapid acting sheeting aid.) are reducing agents which relax wheat dough. Adding minute amounts of oxidants or reducing agents alter the post-mix handling characteristics of dough. Common reducing agents are:

- L-cysteine (E920, E921; quantities in the tens of ppm range help soften the dough and thus reduce processing time)
- fumaric acid
- sodium bisulfite
- yeast cell lysate

== Emulsifiers ==
Lecithins, monoglycerides, diglycerides, and DATEM are considered emulsifiers. They disperse fat more evenly throughout the dough, helping it to trap more of the carbon dioxide bubbles produced by yeast. Lecithin added at a rate of 0.25-to-0.6% of the flour weight acts as a dough conditioner. Liquid soy lecithin may be used at a rate of up to 2% of the fat weight. It may be preferred to base the percentage on fat because lecithin dissolves well in warm fats. Based on total weight, egg yolk contains about 9% lecithin. Monoglycerides and diglycerides replace egg lecithin in baked goods. Emulsifiers have antistaling effects and tend to produce a finer grain, softer crumb, and with longer proof times, increased baked volumes.

== Enzymes ==
Various enzymes are also used to improve processing characteristics. Yeast cells naturally produce digestive enzymes, but additional enzymes are often added:

- Amylases break down the polysaccharides in flour into smaller sugars, thereby feeding the yeast cells. (Malted barley is a good natural source of amylase enzymes)
- Proteases (e.g papain) improve extensibility of the dough by degrading some of the gluten.
- Lipoxygenases oxidize components within the flour.

== Other agents ==
Other additives may be used as yeast nutrients or as a source of enzymes:

- carbamide (also known as urea) (E927b)
- phosphates
- malted barley

== See also ==
- Chorleywood bread process

== Bibliography ==
- Hui Y and Cork H (2006). Bakery products: science and technology. Blackwell Publishing.
