= Flour bleaching agent =

Substance added to flour to make it appear whiter

A flour bleaching agent is added to fresh milled grains to whiten the flour by removing the yellow colour pigment called xanthophyll. It whitens the flour, which is used in the baking industry.

== Overview ==
Usual flour bleaching agents are:

- Organic peroxides (benzoyl peroxide)
- Calcium peroxide
- Chlorine
- Chlorine dioxide
- Azodicarbonamide
- Nitrogen dioxide
- Atmospheric oxygen, used during natural aging of flour

Use of chlorine, bromates, and peroxides is not allowed in the European Union.

In biscuit making, use of chlorinated flour reduces the spread of the dough, and provides a "tighter" surface. The changes of functional properties of the flour proteins are likely to be caused by their oxidation.

In countries where bleached flour is prohibited, microwaving plain flour produces similar chemical changes to the bleaching process. This improves the final texture of baked goods made to recipes intended for bleached flours.

== See also ==
- Chorleywood bread process – another bread making process that increases volume
- Flour treatment agent
- Graham flour – an early unbleached whole-grain flour
- Maida flour – a commonly bleached flour in India
