= List of British breads =

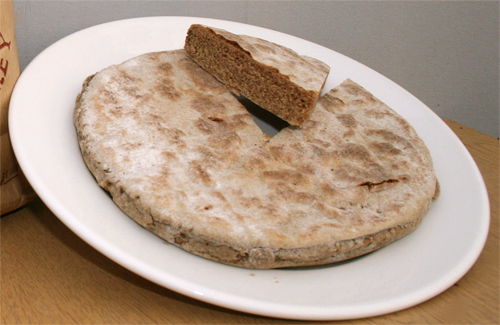
Traditional beremeal bannock, as made in Orkney, Scotland. The separated sector is a scone

This is a list of bread products made in or originating from Britain. British cuisine is the specific set of cooking traditions and practices associated with the United Kingdom. Bread prepared from mixed grains was introduced to Great Britain around 3700 BC.

== Savoury ==
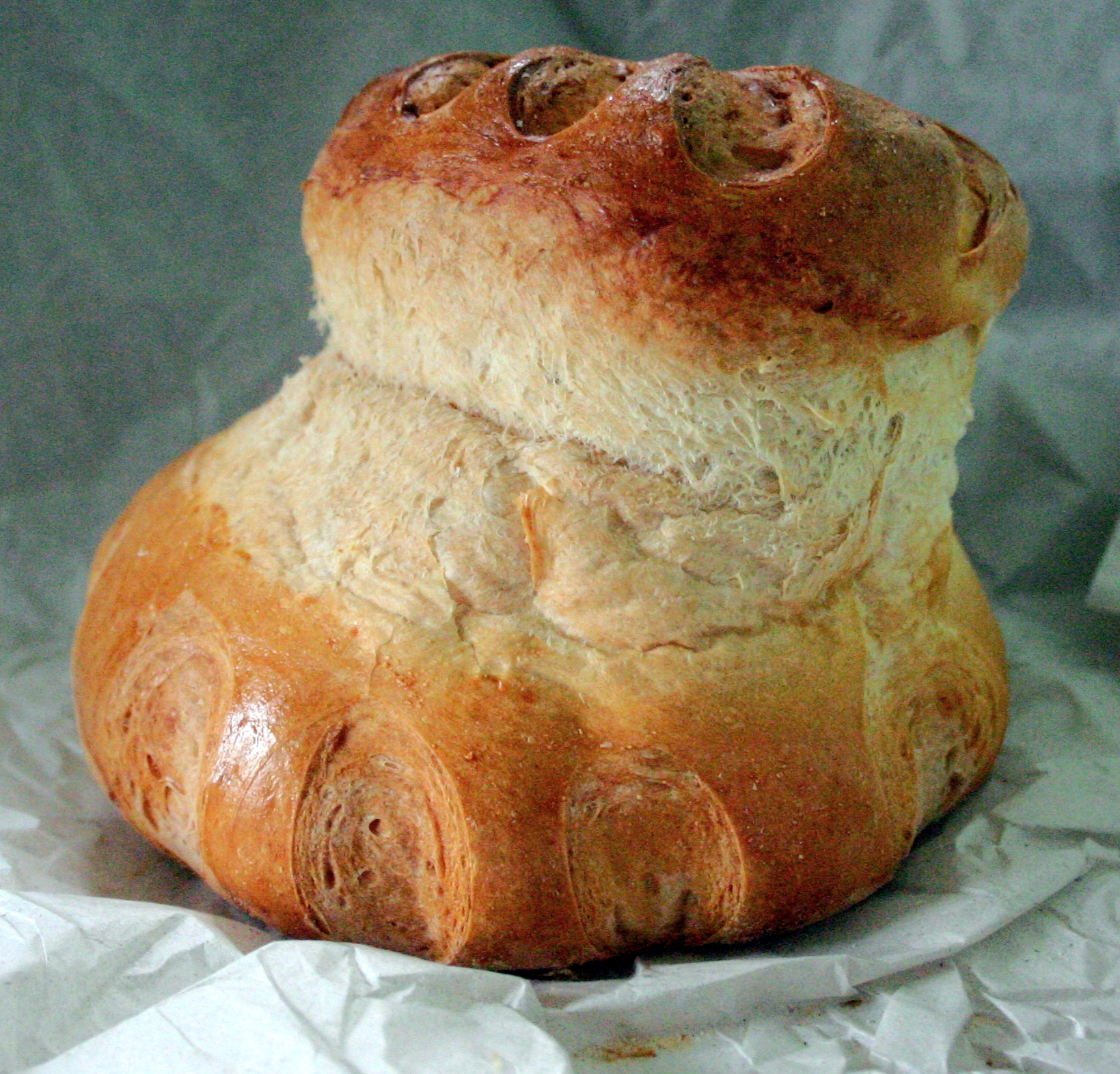
A cottage loaf

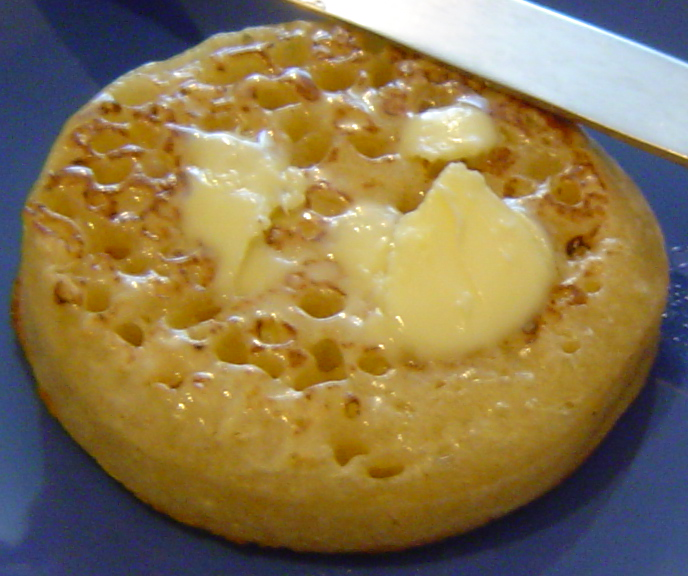
A buttered crumpet

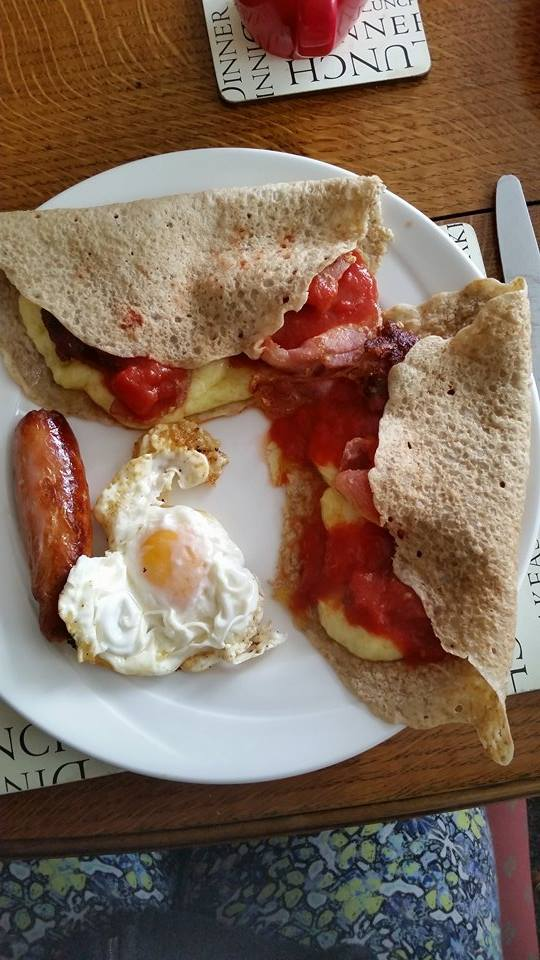
A breakfast consisting of two Staffordshire oatcakes filled with cheese, tomatoes, and back bacon, served with a fried egg and a sausage

- Griddle pancake
  - Bannock
  - Crumpet (also often served sweet; sometimes called pikelets in some areas of England. Although extremely similar, crumpets are thicker with a lighter and fluffier texture, whereas pikelets are thinner and less airy than their close cousins.)
  - English muffin
  - Griddle scone
  - Pikelet – name by which crumpets are known in the Midlands and some areas of Northern England; also, an alternative name in Australia and New Zealand for what are generally called drop scones there. See the above entry for crumpets which details physical differences between crumpets & pikelets which some people note.
  - Scotch pancake, also called pikelet (Australia and New Zealand) or drop scone (some areas of Scotland; Australian and New Zealand)
  - Staffordshire oatcake – called oat cakes by locals
- Bread
  - Barley bread
  - Cockle bread
  - Granary bread – made from malted-grain flour (in the United Kingdom, Granary flour, a proprietary malted-grain flour, is a brand name, so bakeries may call these breads malthouse or malted-grain bread.) See: sprouted bread for similar.
  - Rowie
- Loaf
  - Bloomer – hand-shaped loaf with rounded ends, often with deep diagonal slashes made to the top before baking, tray baked
  - Batch loaf
  - Cob – bread loaf of a roughly spherical shape, slightly flattened
  - Cottage loaf
  - Manchet
  - Milk roll – also known as a 'Blackpool milk roll'.
  - National Loaf
  - Pan loaf (tin loaf) - a loaf with a cut along the top is known as a split tin. The split can be accentuated by brushing with cold water.
  - Plain loaf
  - Tiger bread
- Bun
  - Barm cake
  - Bap
  - Devonshire split (traditionally part of a cream tea, rather than scones)
  - Scuffler
  - Stottie cake
  - Lancashire oven bottom
  - Roll
  - Sub
- Flatbread
  - Farl
  - Oatcake § England
    - Staffordshire oatcake
    - Derbyshire oatcake
    - Lancashire and Yorkshire oatcake, also known as Cumberland oatcake, havver cake or clapcake
  - Oatcake § Scotland
  - Tattie scone
  - Potato cake

== Sweet ==
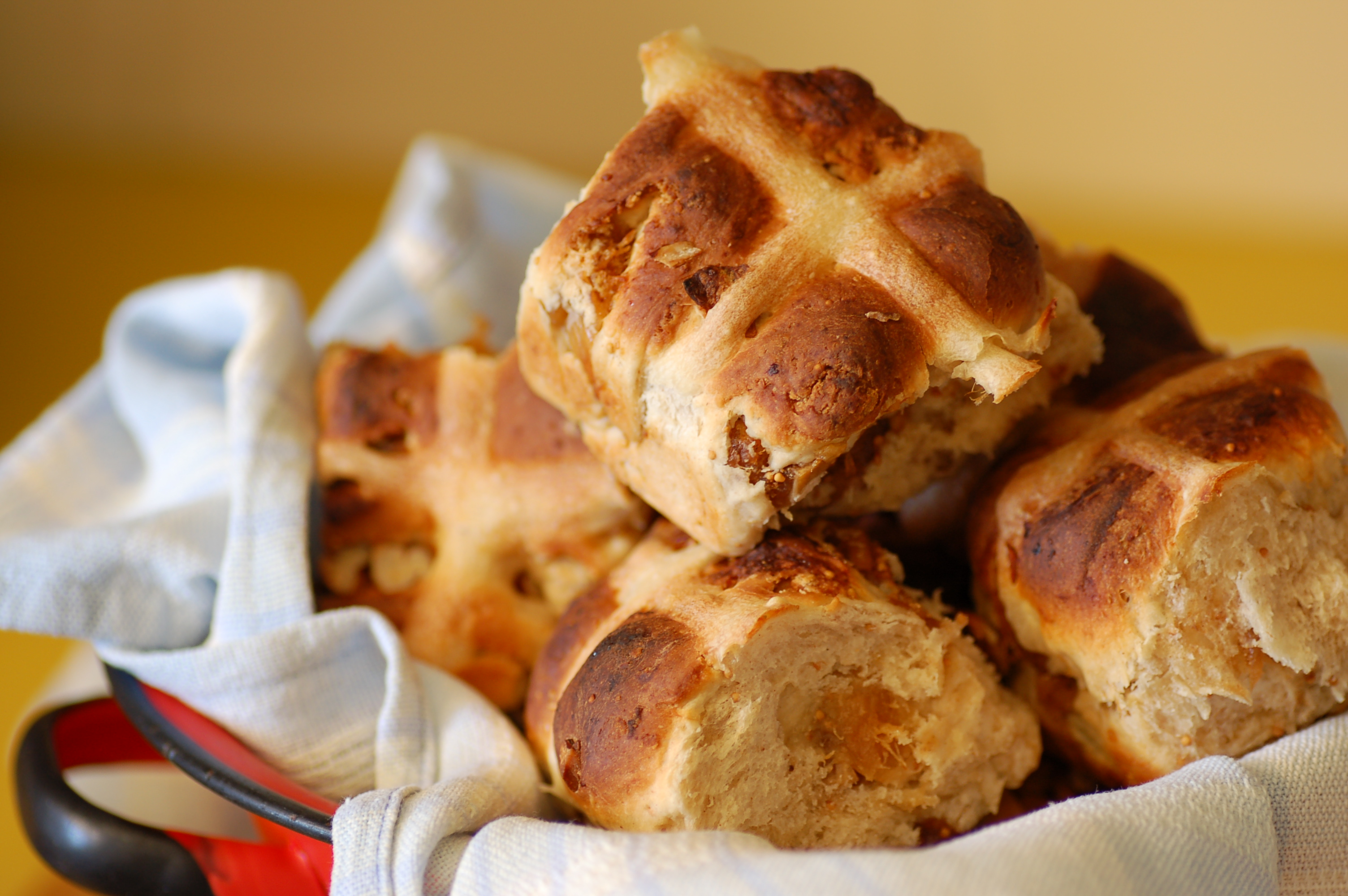
Homemade hot cross buns

- Bara brith
- Bath bun
- Chelsea bun
- Colston bun
- Dripping cake
- Fat rascal
- Hot cross bun
- Iced bun
- Lancashire or Yorkshire tea bread
- Lardy cake
- London bun
- Rum baba
- Saffron bun
- Scone (also often savoury)
- Soul cake
- Teacake
  - Sally Lunn bun
- Welsh cake

== See also ==
- Bread in Europe#United Kingdom
- Chorleywood bread process developed in Britain
- English cuisine
- Cream tea (Devonshire tea or Cornish tea)
- List of baked goods
- List of bread rolls
- List of breads
- List of British desserts
- List of English dishes
- List of quick breads
- Northern Irish cuisine
- Scottish cuisine
- Welsh cuisine
