= Bread in Europe =

Bread is a staple food throughout Europe. Throughout the 20th century, there was a huge increase in global production, mainly due to a rise in available, developed land throughout Europe, North America, and Africa.

== Czech Republic ==
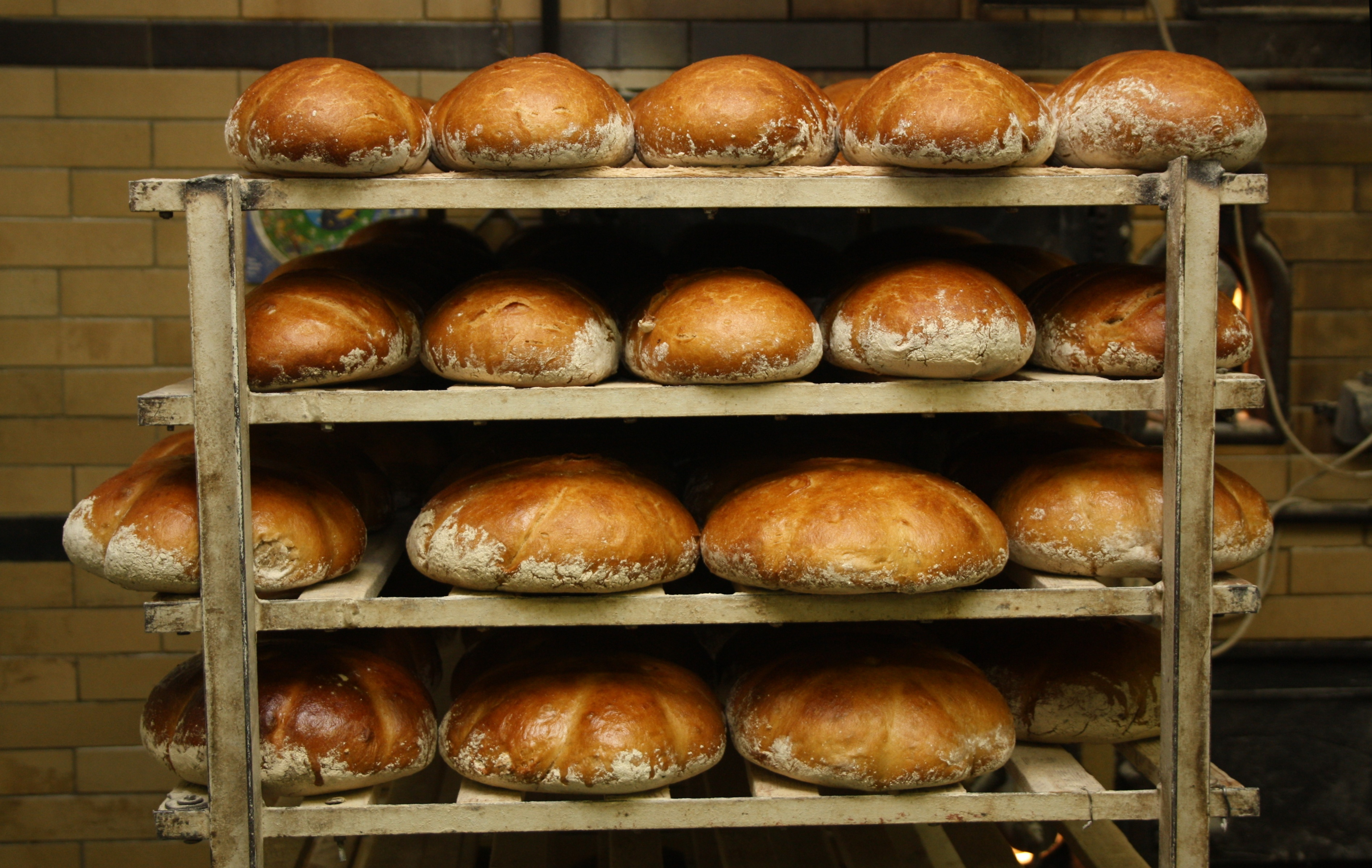
A rack of commercially-prepared bread in the Czech Republic

In the Czech Republic, various kinds of bread are made, all sourdough, the differences depending mainly on the type of flour used. Loaves sold in supermarkets are not packed, however, when the loaves are being sold cut in half, shops are required to wrap them in a plastic bag. Non-sourdough sliced bread is called toustový chléb (toast bread) and is used only for making toasts.

== Denmark ==
In the late 19th century, Danish bakers in the larger towns baked fresh bread in the morning. This bread, called morgenbrød, made primarily from wheat and intended for the rising bourgeoisie, was baked into various shapes and with a variety of seasonings. Since then, this freshly baked bread has been produced in every Danish baker's shop, along with a variety of other breads. This decentralised form of baking bread alongside the more modern industrialised production of bread seems to be characteristic of the Danish bread sector. Consumption, to a great extent, has switched from rye bread to wheat bread.

== Finland and Russia ==
Finland and Russia both have dark sourdough breads made of rye. Traditional Finnish rye bread is disc-shaped, with a hole in the center for easier storing. These breads have a rougher composition and a stronger taste than wheat bread, and can thus be stored for longer periods. Some families have leaven cultures, handed down from one generation to the next, that they use for baking these breads. Bread is made from all four of the cereals grown in Finland: wheat, rye, barley and oats; these are usually ground into various grades. Rye bread can be either light or dark in colour, depending on the type of flour mixture used. A few wheat breads are still made in Finland, although most are simple buns or loaves of sliced or unsliced bread. Some of the breads are thinner, multigrain types, such as elongated sekaleipä. Vesirinkeli (water rings) are small, almost tasteless rings of yeast-leavened wheat bread, which resemble bagels. The potato, although a late introduction to Finland in the early 19th century, features heavily in food culture and has found its way into many kinds of bread.

== France ==
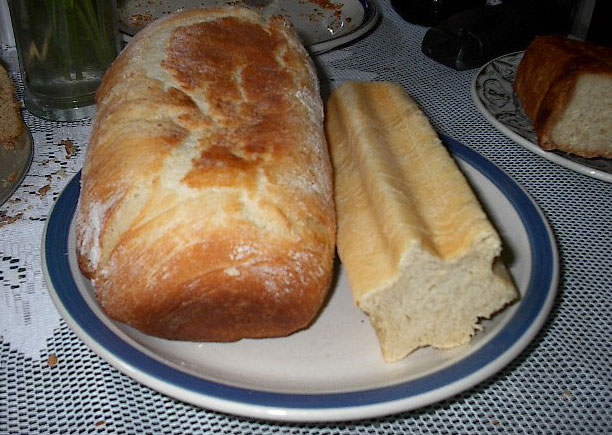
Two loaves of pain de mie

In France, pan bread is known as pain de mie and is used only for toast or for making stuffing; standard bread (in the form of baguettes or thicker breads) has a thick crust and often has large bubbles of air inside. It is often baked three times daily and is sold totally unwrapped for a crisp crust. Some fancy breads contain walnuts or are encrusted with poppy seeds.

== Germany ==
Germany prides itself on having the largest variety of breads worldwide. More than 300 basic kinds of bread are produced with more than 1,000 types of small bread-rolls and pastries. It has been estimated that the basic kinds of bread are so widely varied by more than 16,001 local bakeries that more than 1,000 different breads have been presented at a 2005 Cologne bread show. Germans are worldwide the biggest consumers (per capita) of bread, followed by Chile. In 2012 there were 13,666 bakeries in Germany, but the number has been steadily declining, mainly in favour of supermarkets. 3,090 different kinds of bread are listed in the German Bread Registry. Popularity of kinds of bread: mixed bread (wheat and rye) 31.8%, toast bread 21.6%, bread with grains and seeds 14.8%, brown bread 11.5%.

== Iceland ==
With the settlement of Iceland about 800–900 AD, grain, in the form of barley, was brought, cultivated and used for bread and porridge. Grain cultivation is thought to have been abandoned before 1600 due to harsher climatic conditions, and, subsequent to this, most grains such as barley and rye were imported. The scarcity of grain was overcome in different ways in different parts of the country. In some areas, grain was made to go further using dulse (Palmaria palmata; in Icelandic, söl), Iceland moss (Cetraria islandica; in Icelandic, fjallagrös) or Irish moss (Chondrus crispus; in Icelandic, fjörugrös) in compotes and breads. It was not until the 18th century that it became common practice to make leavened rye breads; sourdough was mostly used. Rye breads baked in hot springs are a popular item today, and are served for local consumption as well as for tourists. In general, stock fish (harðfiskur) was served as a bread substitute, eaten with butter on the side with almost every meal. Today, it is a popular snack that has found a new target group within the sports food market because of its high-protein and favourable amino acid content. Most types of breads available in other Western countries are now also available in Iceland, either baked in Iceland or imported. Everyday bread is mostly made by industrial bakeries or at the local bakery. Of the bread types currently available, flatbrauð (flatbread) and laufabrauð (leaf bread) have the longest history. Iceland's first and oldest bakery is Bernöftsbakari founded 25. September 1834.

== Ireland ==
In Ireland it is traditionally held that the end of a loaf of bread (the "heel" of the loaf) is the best part of the loaf. Other stories and myths surround this piece of the bread in Irish mythology. Irish soda bread, developed to make the most of the soft wheat grown in Ireland, is unusual for a European bread in that it is a quick bread, using the reaction of buttermilk and baking soda rather than yeast to rise. Another traditional Irish bread is barmbrack, a yeasted bread with added sultanas and raisins, customarily consumed at Halloween. Potato bread is also traditional in Ireland, especially in Ulster.

== Italy ==
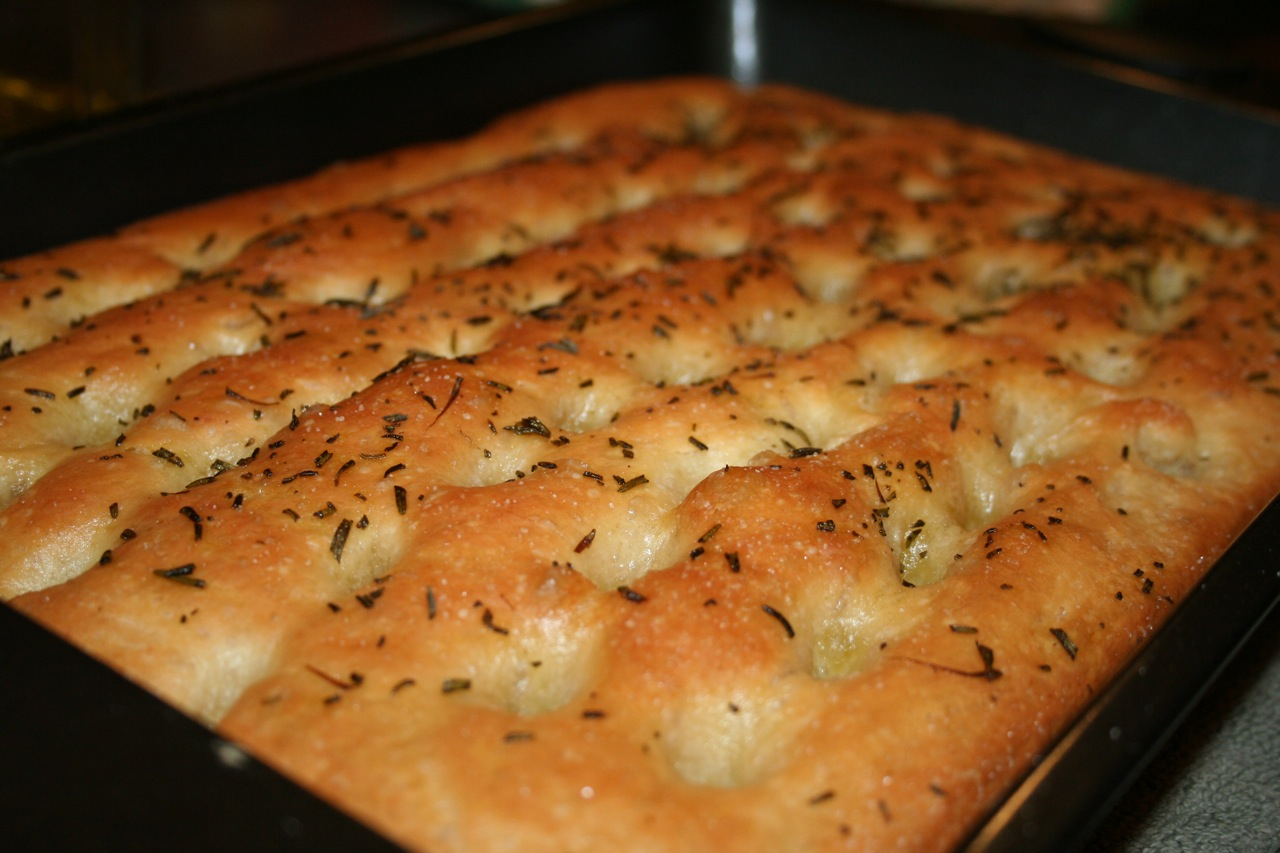
Focaccia bread with rosemary

Because of its long history of regional political division, Italy specializes in many different kinds of bread, reflecting its great regional variation and widely different breadmaking recipes and traditions. In general, rolls are typical of the northern regions, while large loaves are typical of the southern regions. Bread often has a small quantity of olive oil, butter, or rendered lard mixed into the dough to make it softer and more palatable. Traditional rustic breads include sfilatino imbottito (a stuffed bread roll) and pizza bianca (a flat white bread). Focaccia is quite popular in Italy and southern France. In Provence, it is known as fougasse or fouace, with the former becoming increasingly common. Fougasse can now be bought all over France. It is usually seasoned with olive oil and herbs, and often either topped with cheese or stuffed with meat or vegetables. Focaccia doughs are similar in style and texture to pizza doughs. "Pane in cassetta" and "pan carré" are low-grade factory produced convenience foods sold in all Italian supermarkets. They are very light, contain preservatives (e.g. ethyl alcohol) and have a very long shelf life (often more than a month).

== Latvia ==
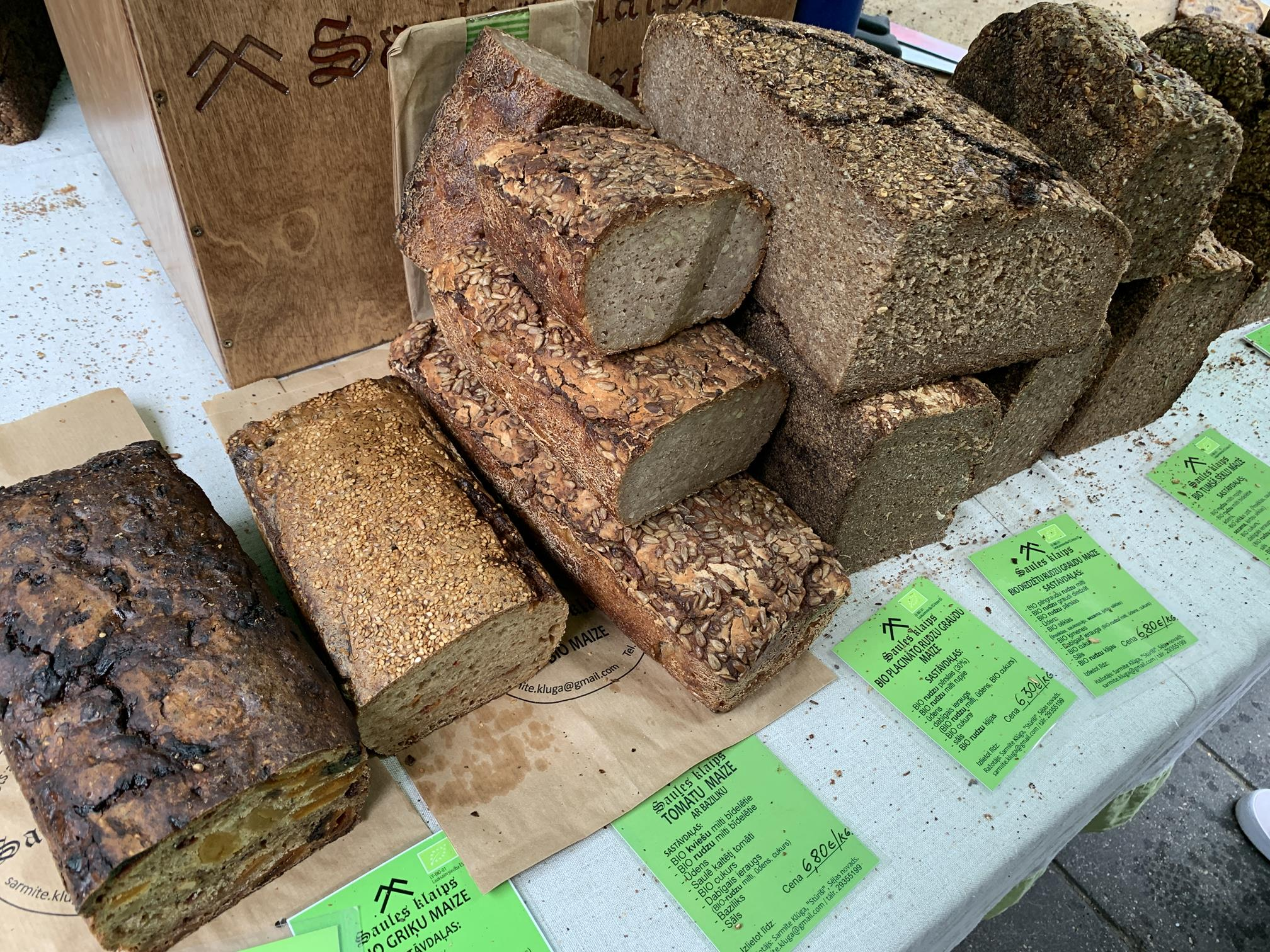
Latvian traditional rye bread

In Latvia, rye bread (rudzu maize) has been a national food staple for centuries and is included in the Latvian Culture Canon. The bread is similar to a Russian or German black bread and is made from coarse rye flour, malt and caraway seeds and traditionally baked in a wood-fired oven. The leftover rye bread is used to make the layered rye bread dessert (rupjmaizes kārtojums). Another popular type of bread is sweet and sour bread (saldskābmaize) made from finely ground rye flour and caraway seeds. Fried rye bread with garlic (ķiploku grauzdiņi) and mayonnaise is often served as a starter in restaurants and bars. White bread (baltmaize) was considered a delicacy and was only eaten on festive occasions.

== Norway ==
Many new types of bread have reached the markets in Norway in recent years. A high percentage of people report regularly eating varieties such as spelt, specialty, gourmet, and fibre/bran bread, as well as ciabattas and baguettes, although very few reported doing so on a daily basis. Norwegian bakers face competition from abroad; the whole grain bread from local bakers must give way to large quantities of baguettes and frozen dough offering cheaper products. Flatbread is still a very popular bread type.

== Portugal ==
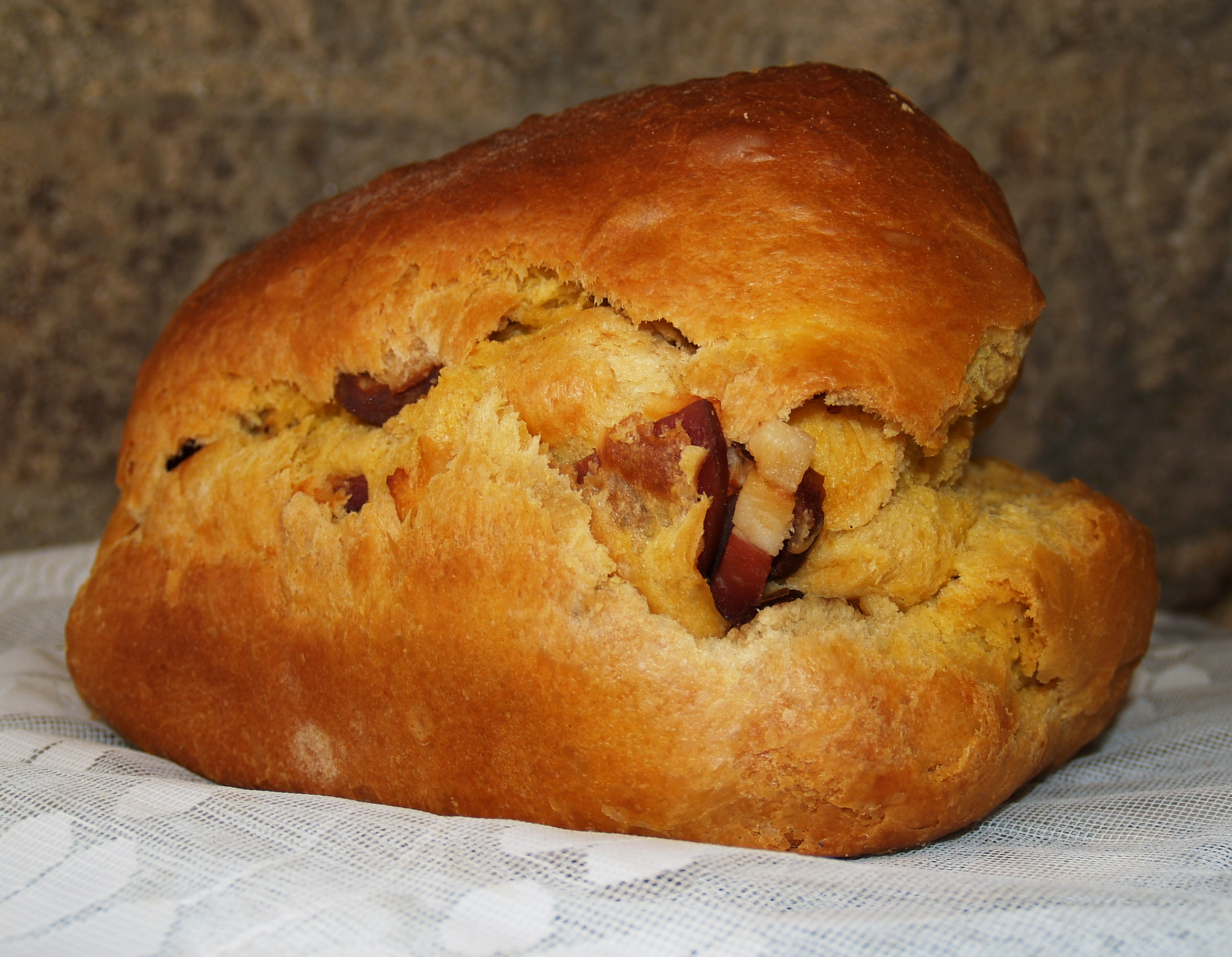
Folar de Chaves

Broa de Avintes, also known as Boroa of Avintes, is a farmhouse bread of Avintes, a parish of Vila Nova de Gaia. It has a long tradition in Portugal and is widely consumed in the northern part of the country. Folar is a traditional Portuguese bread served at Easter. The recipe varies from region to region and it may be sweet or salty. Portuguese sweet bread is a bread made with milk, sugar and/or honey, eggs, yeast, flour and sometimes lemon peel to produce a subtly sweet lightly textured loaf or rolls.

== Spain ==
In Spain, traditional bread or pan is a long loaf, similar to the French baguette but wider and shorter, generally called "barra" and many other different names along the country like "pistola" or "bastón". There's also a long variety of types with different forms, presentations and recipes such as "chapata", "payés", "gallego", "candeal", "mollete", etc. French baguettes are also common to find in bakeries. One can buy it freshly made every morning in almost every supermarket or traditional bakeries, where there is a large assortment of bread. Bread is widely consumed alongside almost every meal, or even making it an important part of some iconic pieces of Hispanic cuisine such as bocadillos or pinchos. In Spain, especially in the Mediterranean area, there have been guilds of bakers for over 750 years. The bakers guild in Barcelona was founded in 1200 AD. There is a region called Tierra del Pan ("Land of the Bread"), located in the province of Zamora, where the economy was in the past joined to this activity.

== Sweden ==
In Sweden, during the transition to a modern urban and industrialised society in the 19th century, bread types changed when large industrial bakeries introduced new soft bread. From the early 1920s, these were often sweetened. From then on, bread was bought from stores and bakeries, rather than baked at home, as had previously been the case. Regional variation decreased due to the transportation and marketing of bread as a national product. The consumption of bread products of various kinds has increased since the 1990s, and wholegrain bread and wheat bread are the most popular. Many older bread types still exist alongside the newer varieties.

== Switzerland ==
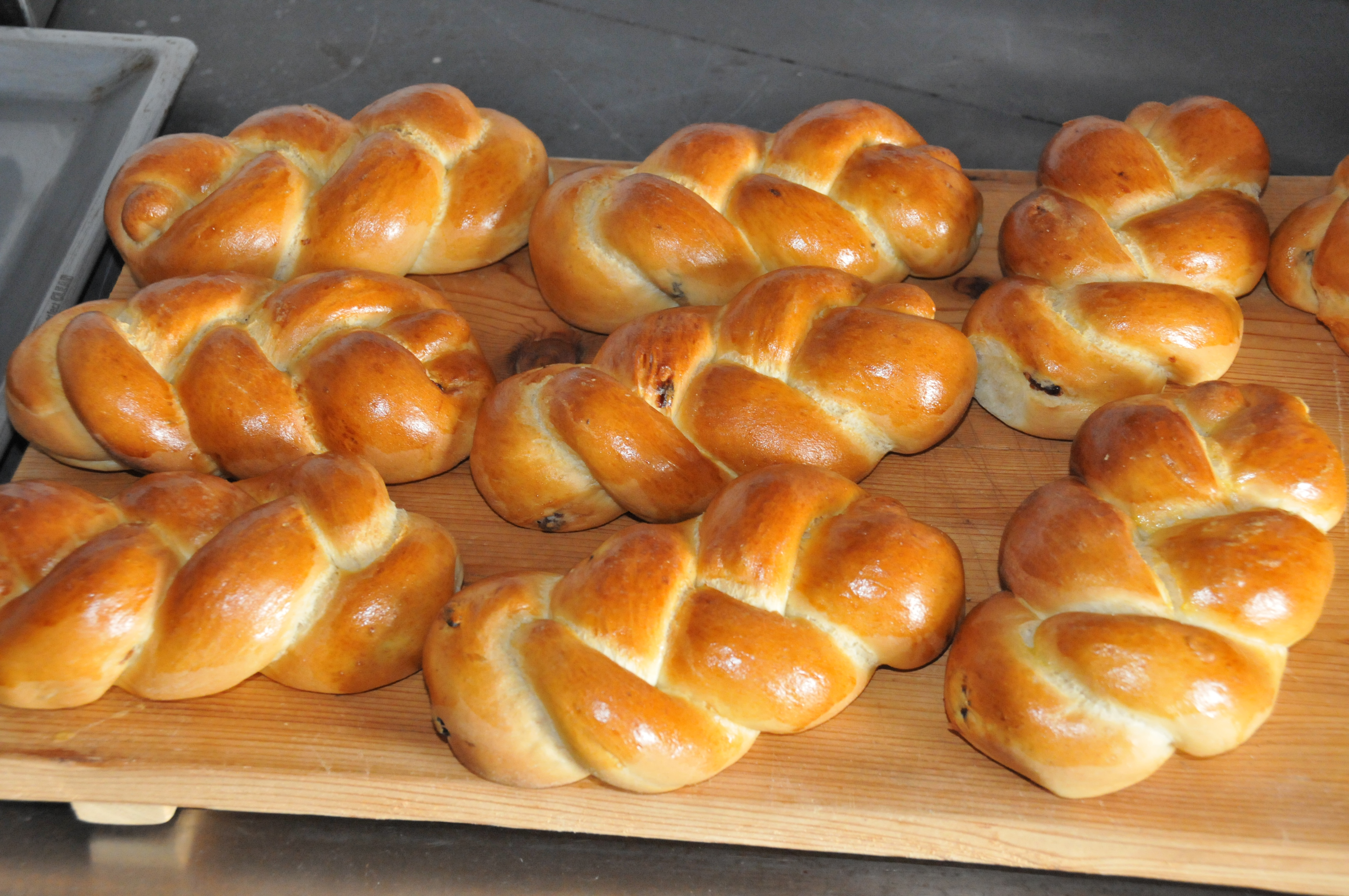
Swiss Zopf bread

Some of the earliest evidence of bread consumption come from Swiss archaeological excavations including neolithic bread-like objects found near Lake Zurich and a sourdough loaf dating from 3560-3530 B.C found in Lake Biel.

Today, bread remains a staple food in Switzerland, where both sweet and savory varieties are widely enjoyed. Popular breads across the country include (but are not limited to) zopf and weggli, while each canton also has its own traditional specialties, often influenced by the region’s predominant language and culture.

== Turkey ==
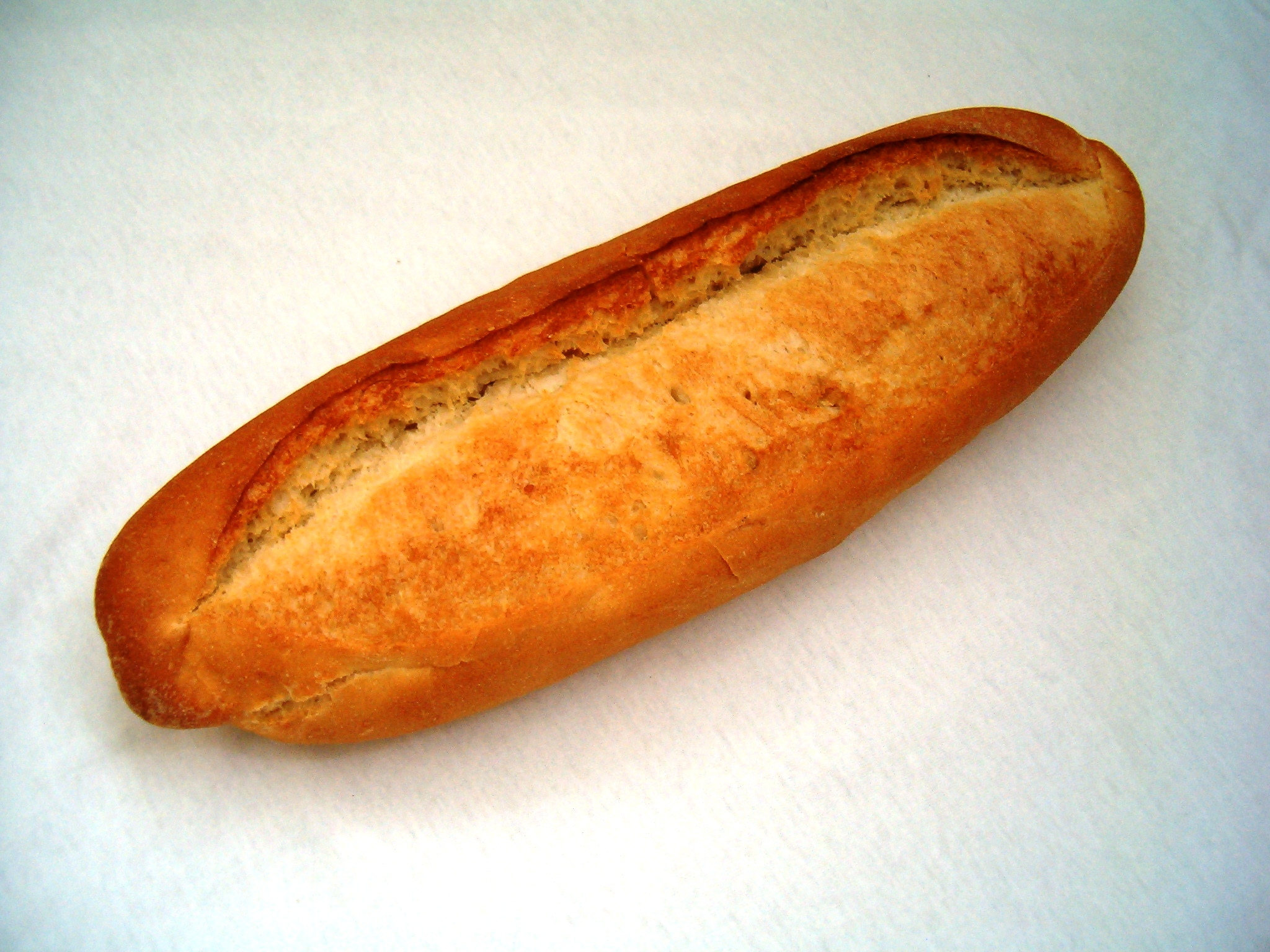
Turkish bread

Bread is an integral part of the Turkish cuisine and eaten very commonly. According to Guinness World Records, Turkey has the largest per capita consumption of bread in the world as of 2000, with 199.6 kg (440 lb) per person; Turkey is followed in bread consumption by Serbia and Montenegro with 135 kg (298 lb), and Bulgaria with 133.1 kg (293 lb).

Aside from the common bread that is shown in the photo, bazlama, gözleme, lavaş, pide, simit, and yufka are popular varieties. In particular, a variety of pita traditionally eaten during Ramadan is called Ramazan pidesi.

== United Kingdom ==
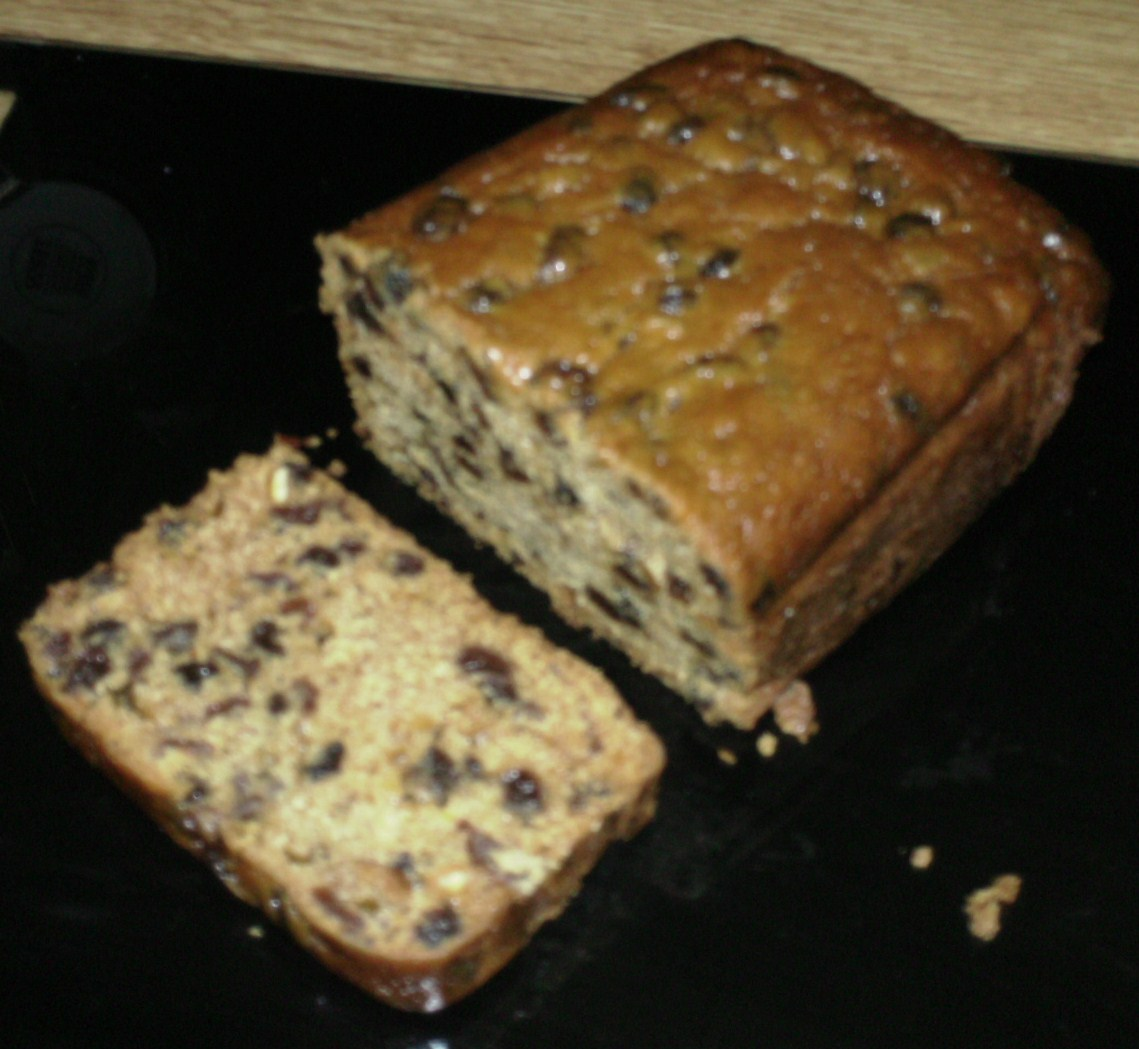
Bara brith

There is a wide variety of traditional breads in Great Britain, often baked in a rectangular tin. Round loaves are also produced, such as the North East England speciality called a stottie cake. A cottage loaf is made of two balls of dough, one on top of the other, to form a figure-of-eight shape. A cob is a small round loaf. There are many variations on bread rolls, such as baps, barms, breadcakes and so on.

The Chorleywood process for mass-producing bread was developed in England in the 1960s before spreading worldwide. Major commercial bread brands include Warburtons, Hovis, and Kingsmill, and 60-70% of the bread eaten in the UK is white. Rye bread is mostly eaten in the form of Scandinavian-style crisp bread, such as that produced by Ryvita in Birmingham. The popularity of Indian cuisine in Britain means that Indian breads such as naan are made and eaten there. Continental varieties, such as baguettes (also known as "French sticks"), focaccia, and bagels are also popular.

Wales has a sweet bread called bara brith, which includes fruit in the recipe.

In Scotland a bread called plain bread is also eaten. These loaves are noticeably taller and thinner, with burned crusts at only the top and bottom of the loaf, and with a much firmer texture than English and American pan bread.

== See also ==
- List of breads
- European Bread Museum
