= Crumpet =

Small unsweetened griddle bread

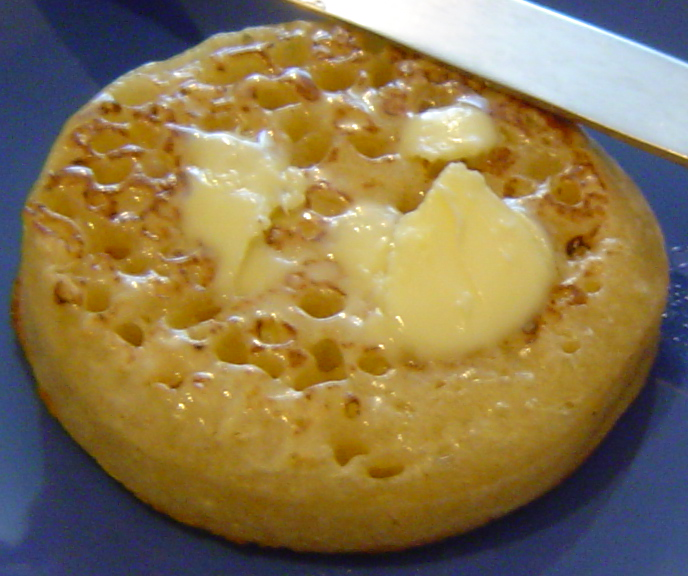
- A buttered crumpet
- Type: Bread
- Place of origin: United Kingdom
- Region or state: United Kingdom and other parts of the Commonwealth
- Main ingredients: Flour, butter, yeast

A crumpet (/ˈkrʌmpɪt/) is a small griddle bread, originating from the United Kingdom, made from an unsweetened batter of water or milk, flour, and yeast. It has since become popular in Australia, Canada, New Zealand, and South Africa.

Historically, crumpets are also regionally known as "pikelets". This is limited, however, as pikelets are more widely known as a thinner, more pancake-like griddle bread; a type of the latter is referred to as a "crumpet" in Scotland.

== History and etymology ==
Crumpets have been variously described as originating in Wales or as part of the Anglo-Saxon diet, based on proposed etymologies of the word. In either case, breads were, historically, commonly cooked on a griddle wherever bread ovens were unavailable. The bara planc^{a}, or griddle bread, baked on an iron plate over a fire, was part of the everyday diet in Wales until the 19th century.

Small, oval pancakes baked in this manner were called picklets, a name used for the first recognisable crumpet-type recipe, published in 1769 by Elizabeth Raffald in The Experienced English Housekeeper. This name was derived from the Welsh bara pyglyd or "pitchy [i.e., dark or sticky] bread", later shortened simply to pyglyd. The early 17th-century lexicographer Randle Cotgrave referred to "popelins, soft bread of fine flour, &c., fashioned like our Welsh barrapycleds".

The word spread initially to the West Midlands of England, where it became anglicised as pikelet, and subsequently to Cheshire, Lancashire, Yorkshire, and other areas of Northern England; crumpets are still referred to as pikelets in some areas. The word crumpet itself, of unclear origin, first appears in relatively modern times; it has been suggested as referring to a crumpled or curled-up cake, based on an isolated 14th-century reference to a "crompid cake", and the Old English word crompeht ('crumpled') being used to gloss Latin folialis, possibly a type of thin bread.

Alternatively, crumpet may be related to the Welsh crempog or crempot, a type of pancake; Breton krampouzh and Cornish krampoth for 'pancakes' are cognate with the Welsh. An etymology from French crompâte 'a paste of fine flour, slightly baked', has also been suggested. However, a correspondent to Manchester Notes and Queries, writing in 1883, claimed that the crampet, as it was then locally known, simply took its name from the metal ring or "cramp" used to retain the batter during cooking.

The early crumpets were hard pancakes cooked on a griddle, rather than the soft and spongy crumpets of the Victorian era, which were made with yeast. From the 19th century, a little bicarbonate of soda was also usually added to the batter. In modern times, the mass production of crumpets by large commercial bakeries has eroded some regional differences. As late as the 1950s, Dorothy Hartley noted a wide degree of regional variation, identifying the small, thick, spongy type of crumpet specifically with the Midlands.

== Characteristics ==
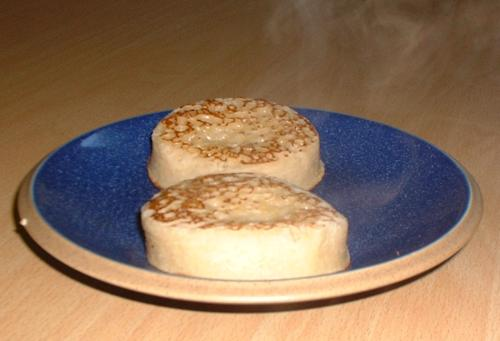
Hot crumpets

Crumpets are distinguished from similarly sized muffins by being made from a batter, rather than a dough. English crumpets are generally circular, roughly 8 centimetres (3 in) in diameter and 2 centimetres (3/4 in) thick. Their shape comes from being restrained in the pan or griddle by a shallow ring. They have a characteristic flat top with many small pores and a spongy texture which allows butter or other spreads to permeate.

Crumpets may be cooked until ready to eat warm from the pan, but may also be left slightly undercooked and then toasted. While premade commercial versions are available in most supermarkets, freshly home-made crumpets are less heavy and doughy in texture. They are usually eaten with a spread of butter, or with other sweet or savoury toppings.

While in some areas of the country the word pikelet is synonymous with the crumpet, in others (such as Staffordshire and Yorkshire) it refers to a different recipe. A pikelet is distinguished by containing no yeast as a raising agent and by using a thinner batter than a crumpet, and as being cooked without a ring, giving a flatter result than a crumpet. In Stoke-on-Trent, pikelets are and have historically been sold in the town's many oatcake shops. A 1932 recipe for Staffordshire pikelets specifies that they were made with flour and buttermilk, with bicarbonate of soda as a raising agent, and suggests cooking them using bacon fat.

The term pikelet is used in Australian and New Zealand cuisine for a smaller version, served cold or just warm from the pan, of what in Scotland and North America would be called a pancake and, in England, a Scotch pancake, girdle or griddle cake, or drop scone.

== Scottish crumpet ==
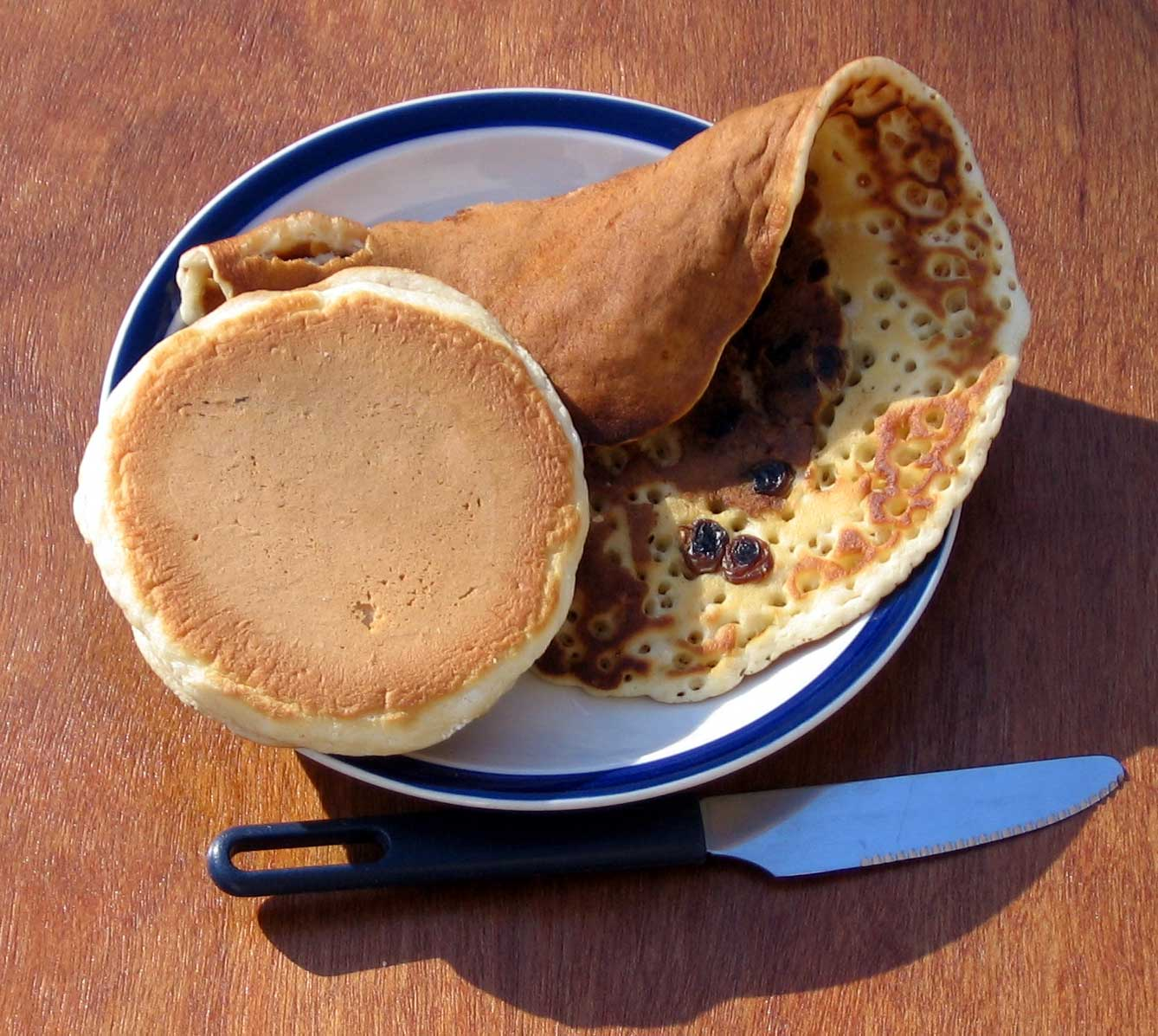
A Scotch pancake (left) and folded Scottish fruit crumpet (right)

A Scottish crumpet is broadly similar to the crumpet of parts of Northern England. It is made from the same ingredients as a Scotch pancake, and is about 18 centimetres (7 in) diameter and 8 millimetres (0.3 in) thick. It is available plain, or as a fruit crumpet with raisins baked in, usually fried in a pan and served with a fried breakfast. It is also sometimes served with butter and jam. The ingredients include a leavening agent, usually baking powder, and different proportions of eggs, flour, and milk, which create a thin batter. Unlike a pancake, it is cooked to brown on one side only, resulting in a smooth darker side where it has been heated by the griddle, then lightly cooked on the other side which has holes where bubbles have risen to the surface during cooking.

== Ireland ==
While now relatively uncommon in Ireland, crumpets were once produced by Boland's Bakery in Dublin during the 19th and much of the 20th centuries; Boland's recipe was subsequently used by a number of other bakeries. Irish crumpets differed from most British recipes by having a yeastless batter and being cooked on both sides, giving a smooth rather than spongy top.

== See also ==
- Baghrir
- Blini
- Uttappam
- Lahoh
- Apam balik
- Dorayaki
- English muffin
- List of British breads
- Tea
- Thinking man's/woman's crumpet, a slang use of the word

== Notes ==
a. Planc is a borrowing of English 'plank' as in a board or plank. The Welsh word is also used of a griddle, therefore bara planc is 'griddle bread' and not 'plank bread'.
