= Farl =

Scottish and Irish three-cornered flatbreads and cakes

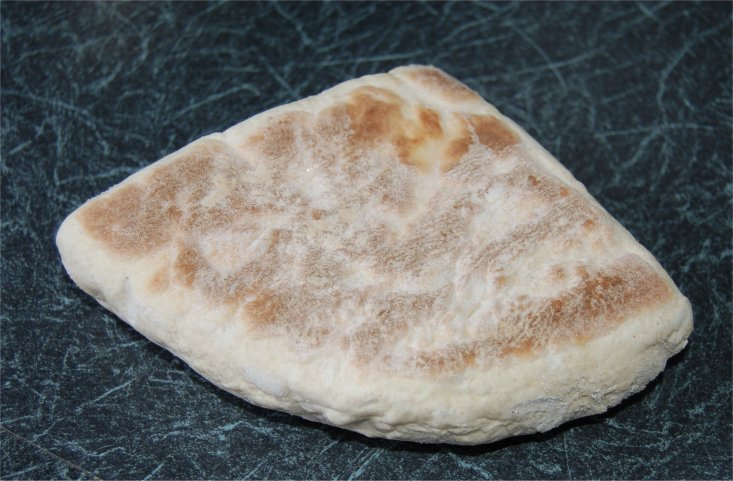
- A soda bread farl. This would have been cut from the rest of the bread along the straight upper and right edges.
- Type: Bread shape

A farl is any of various quadrant-shaped flatbreads and cakes, traditionally made by cutting a round into four pieces. In Ulster, the term generally refers to soda bread (soda farls) and, less commonly, potato bread (potato farls), which are also ingredients of an Ulster fry.

It is made as farls (that is to say, flat rounds about 3/4 inch thick which are then cut into quarters). Modern commercially mass-produced potato farls, however, are often rectangular in form.

In Scotland today, the word is used less than in Ulster, but a farl can be a quarter piece of a large flat scone, bannock, or oatcake. It may also be used for shortbread when baked in this particular shape.

== Etymology ==
Farl is a shorter form of fardel, the word once used in some parts of Lowland Scotland for "a three-cornered cake, usually oatcake, generally the fourth part of a round". In earlier Scots, fardell meant a fourth or quarter.

== Method ==
A farl is made by spreading the dough on a girdle or frying pan in a rough circular shape. The circle is then cut into four equal pieces and cooked. Once one side is done the dough is flipped to cook the other side.

== See also ==
- List of breads
- List of British breads
- List of Irish dishes
- List of quick breads
