= Mother's Pride =

British brand name bread

Mothers Pride is a brand name for a variety of breads produced by British Bakeries, a division of Premier Foods. The company also bakes Nimble (reduced calorie) and Hovis branded loaves as well as supermarket "own brand" ranges.

British Bakeries was set up by Rank, Hovis, McDougall in 1955 to counter the then dominance of Allied Bakeries (Sunblest) and ensure an outlet for their flour products. Mother's Pride, which had been sold in the north of England since at least 1936 (an advert appears for Mother's Pride bread produced by W J Brookes & Sons, Bakers, Old Trafford, Manchester 16 in the 1935 "A Hundred Years of Road Passenger Transport in Manchester", published by Manchester Corporation Transport in that year), was marketed as a national brand by the new division in 1956. During the 1970s and '80s, it was a best-selling brand of white bread in the UK.

The 1960s advertising jingle was: "Mothers Pride's a family, a family of bread". One well-known advertisement featured singer Dusty Springfield singing a jingle called "Knocker-Upper" (which, in the UK, can refer to someone who wakes up other people).

In May 2024, issues with packaging led to the Mothers Pride Scottish plain loaf being temporarily unavailable nationwide, with supply expected to resume in early June.

== See also ==
- List of brand name breads
