= Pasty barm =

English fast food dish

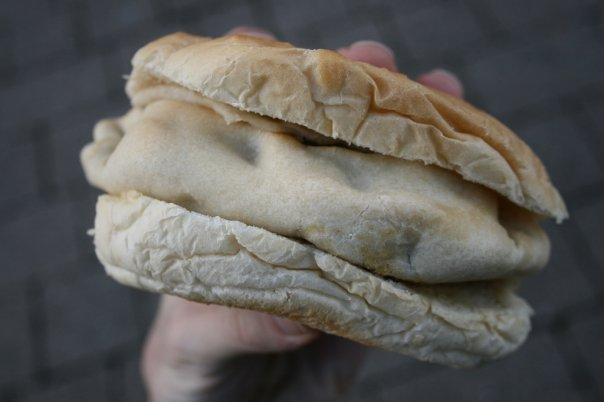
A pasty barm ready to be eaten.

A pasty barm (also called a pastie barm cake or a pastie flour cake) is a fast food dish native to Bolton, a town in North West England. The pasty barm consists of a buttered barm cake with a (standard meat and potato) pasty as the filling.

The snack was supposedly invented by Bolton schoolboys in the 1950s as a "cheap dinner". In 2010 it was voted as Bolton's favourite snack in the local newspaper Bolton News. In 2012 boxer and Bolton native Amir Khan mentioned plans to introduce his American fiancée to "a pasty barm, fish and chips – maybe even an ice cream if she's lucky".

== See also ==
- Barm cake
- Coco bread
