= Colston bun =

Sweet bun with dried fruit and spices

- Type: Sweet bread
- Place of origin: England
- Region or state: Bristol
- Main ingredients: Yeast dough, dried fruit, candied peel, sweet spices

A Colston bun is a sweet bun made of a yeast dough flavoured with dried fruit such as currants, candied peel, and sweet spices. It is made in the city of Bristol, England, and named after Edward Colston, a local merchant and MP, who created the original recipe. There are two size categories: "dinner plate", with eight wedge marks on the surface, and "ha'penny staver", an individual-sized bun.

The Colston bun is traditionally distributed to children on Colston Day (13 November), which celebrates the granting of a royal charter to the Society of Merchant Venturers by King Charles I in 1639. The custom originated from the Colston's School, which was established for poor children in Bristol during the early 18th century. Originally, the child would receive a large "dinner plate" bun with eight wedge marks so that individual portions could be broken off and shared with their family, plus a "staver" which could be eaten immediately to "stave off" hunger, and a gift of 2 shillings (now 10p) from the wives of the Merchant Venturers. The gifts of buns and money were distributed to some school children in Bristol on Colston Day by the Colston Society.

Colston buns are not widely known outside Bristol, and are generally only available for sale on occasion in independent bakers around the city. In the 21st century, the name has become controversial because of Edward Colston's connections to the slave trade. The Colston Society, which had operated for 275 years commemorating Colston and supporting the Colston Day distribution of the bun, decided to disband in 2020 after the George Floyd protests and associated toppling of Colston's statue in Bristol; the society deemed it inappropriate to continue to memorialise him.

== See also ==
- List of British breads
- List of buns
