= Buttery (bread) =

Savoury bread roll originating from Aberdeen, Scotland

Rowie
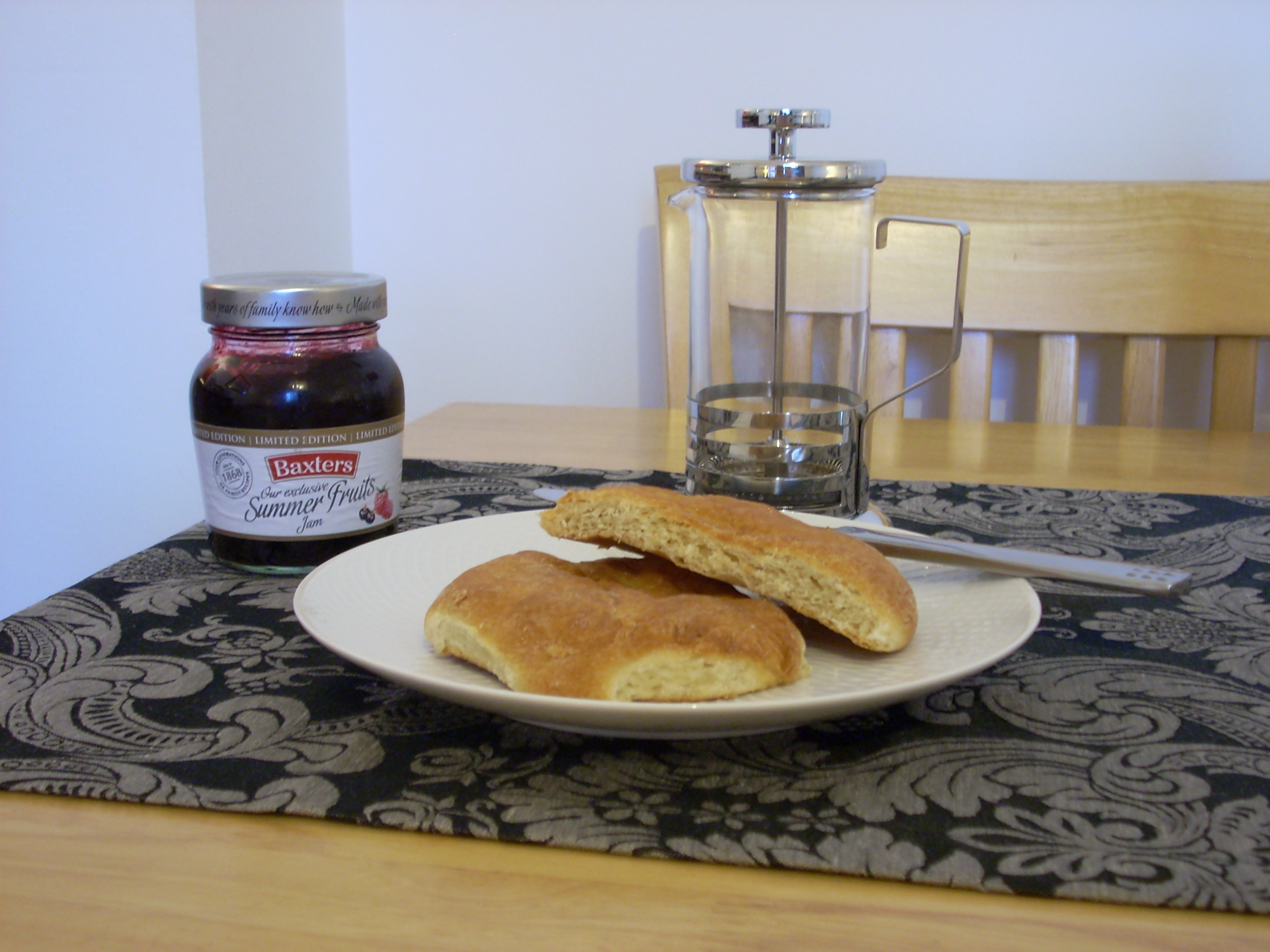
- Alternative names: Buttery, rowie, Aberdeen roll
- Type: Bread roll
- Place of origin: Scotland
- Region or state: Aberdeen
- Main ingredients: Flour, lard, butter or vegetable oil, yeast

A rowie, also known as a buttery or Aberdeen roll, is a savoury bread roll originating from Aberdeen, Scotland.

== Origin ==
Legend has it that the rowie was made for the fishermen sailing from Aberdeen harbour. The theory is that they needed a bread that would not become stale during the two weeks or more that they were at sea. The high fat content meant the bread also provided an immediate energy source.

Rowies are typically made from flour, butter, lard, salt, sugar and yeast. However, concerns have been raised about major commercial producers swapping the traditional butter and lard mixture for palm oil.

== Serving ==
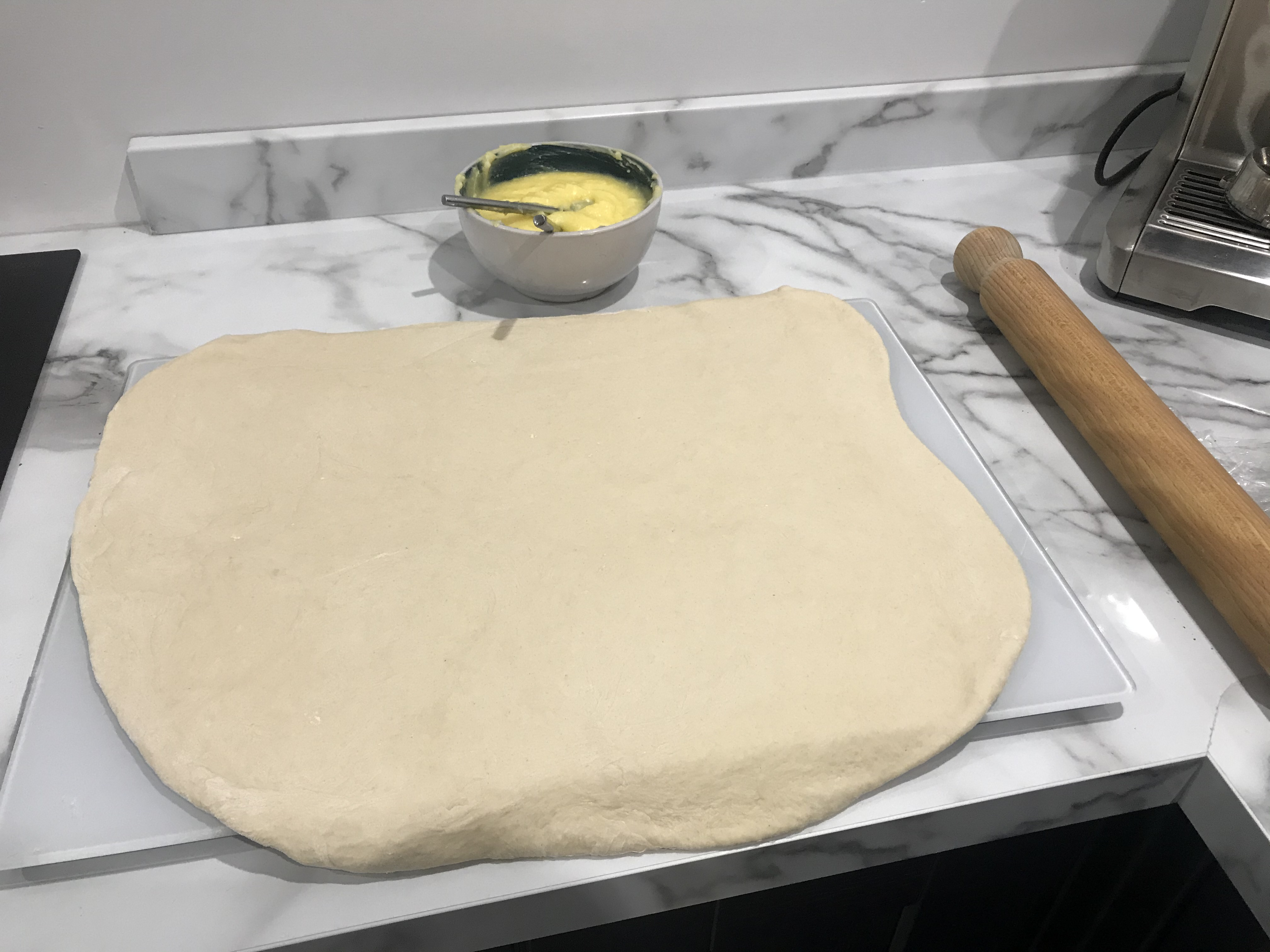
Making Aberdeen butteries.

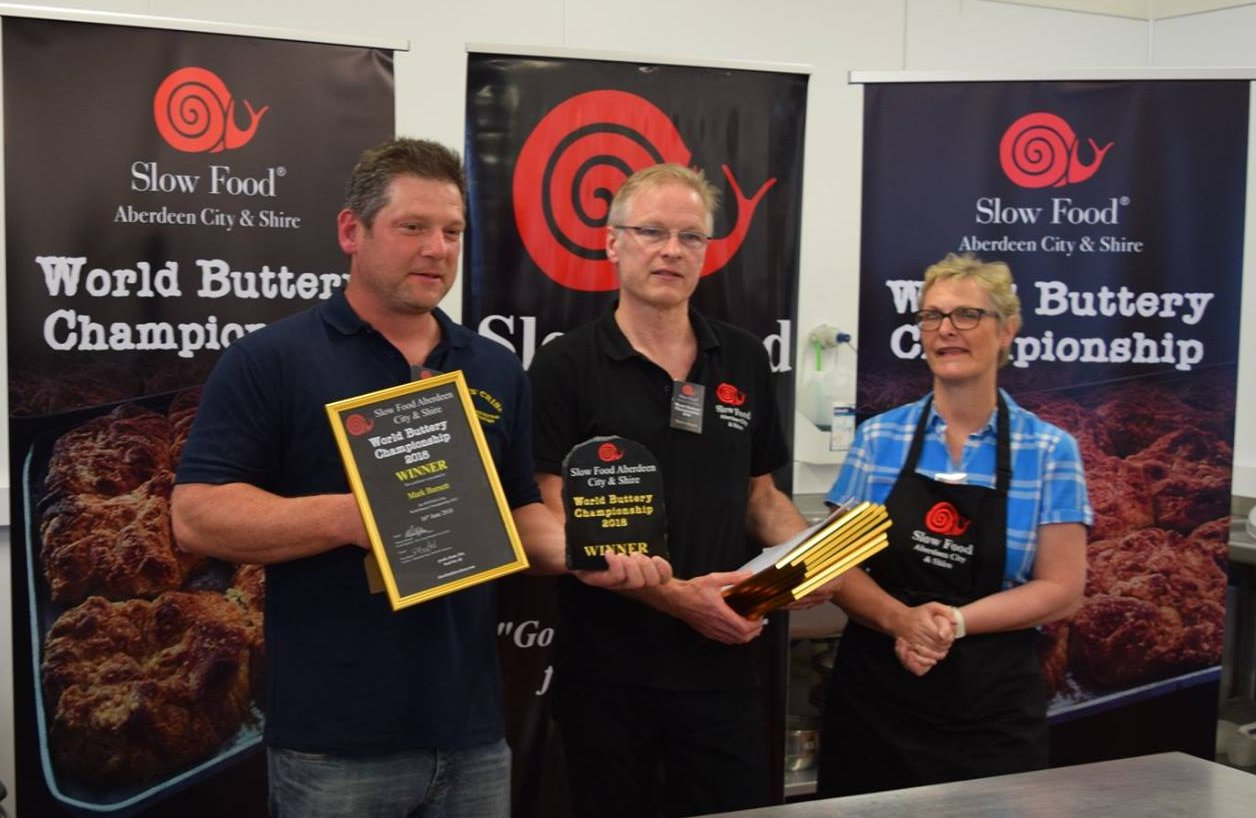
World Buttery Champion 2018, Mark Barnett receives his trophy from Slow Food Aberdeen City & Shire's Martin Gillespie. Also in the picture: Eileen Brown, a competition judge.

Butteries are noted for their flaky texture and buttery taste, similar to that of a croissant, and slight saltiness. They are often toasted and served with jam or butter, golden syrup or plain with tea, although the high fat content makes them extremely hot when toasted.

As the alternative name of Aberdeen roll suggests, butteries are a speciality of Aberdeen but they are common throughout the Northeast of Scotland and are available worldwide.

Articles in the Aberdeen Journal from early in the 19th century bemoan the increased use of lard in place of butter in traditional "butter rolls". In 1917 when restrictions were placed on the sale of bread owing to World War I, butteries were exempt, enabling Aberdeen bakers to continue to produce rowies. The exemption was rescinded a few months later but appeals were made on the grounds that butteries were an intrinsic "part of the food of the working classes in industrial centres." Aberdeen City Food Control Committee continued to challenge the validity of the restriction two years later in February 1919.

In 2006 a buttery was offered for sale on eBay during a fund raising for the Royal Aberdeen Children's Hospital; the successful bidder, Enterprise Engineering, paid £620 for it.

Radio and TV presenter Sir Terry Wogan once memorably described eating a buttery as like having a "mouth full of seaweed".

== World Buttery Championship ==
The first ever World Buttery Championships took place on Saturday, 16 June 2018 at the Aberdeen campus of North East of Scotland College.

The competition was organised by Martin Gillespie on behalf of Slow Food Aberdeen City and Shire to celebrate the Traditional Buttery being 'boarded' on the Slow Food Ark of Taste.

10 finalists took part in a live bake-off and the results were judged in a blind taste test with Mark Barnett, of Gold'N'Crispy, New Pitsligo being crowned the winner.

On 11 November 2024 the World Buttery Championship was revived, again at the Aberdeen campus of North East of Scotland College, and this time the competition was split into two categories.

The Retail Baker category was for bakers who sell their products to the public and after a stiff competition Mark Barnett retained his title very closely followed by Iryna Porfilova, of Bakes You Knead, Forres and Shona Jamieson of The Highlander Bakehouse, Ballater.

The Home Bake category provided those who do not sell their products with the opportunity to bake off and find the best home baked buttery. Here the winner was Jane Hay from Oldmeldrum with runners up Coleen Reid from Aberchirder and Stuart Sproul from Nairn.

Organisers, Slow Food Aberdeen City & Shire plan for the World Buttery Championship to return in June 2026.

== See also ==
- List of bread rolls
- List of British breads
