= Oatcake =

Oat flatbread like a cracker or biscuit

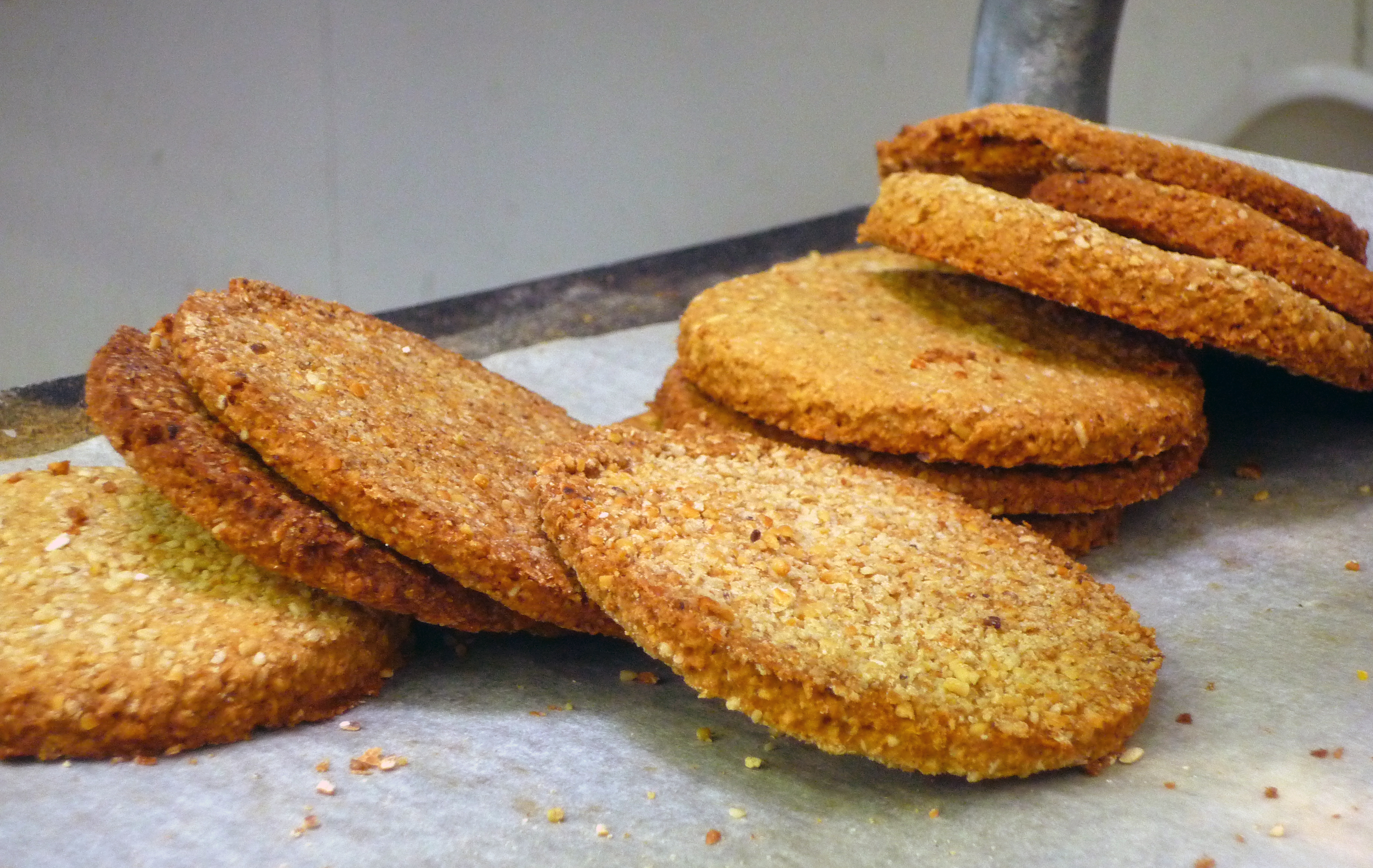
- Oatcakes
- Type: Cracker or biscuit
- Place of origin: Scotland (then Caledonia)
- Main ingredients: Oats, salt, water (Scottish variety)

An oatcake is a type of flatbread similar to a cracker or biscuit, or in some versions takes the form of a pancake. They are prepared with oatmeal as the primary ingredient, and sometimes include plain or wholemeal flour as well. Oatcakes are cooked on a griddle (girdle in Scots) or baked in an oven.

== History ==
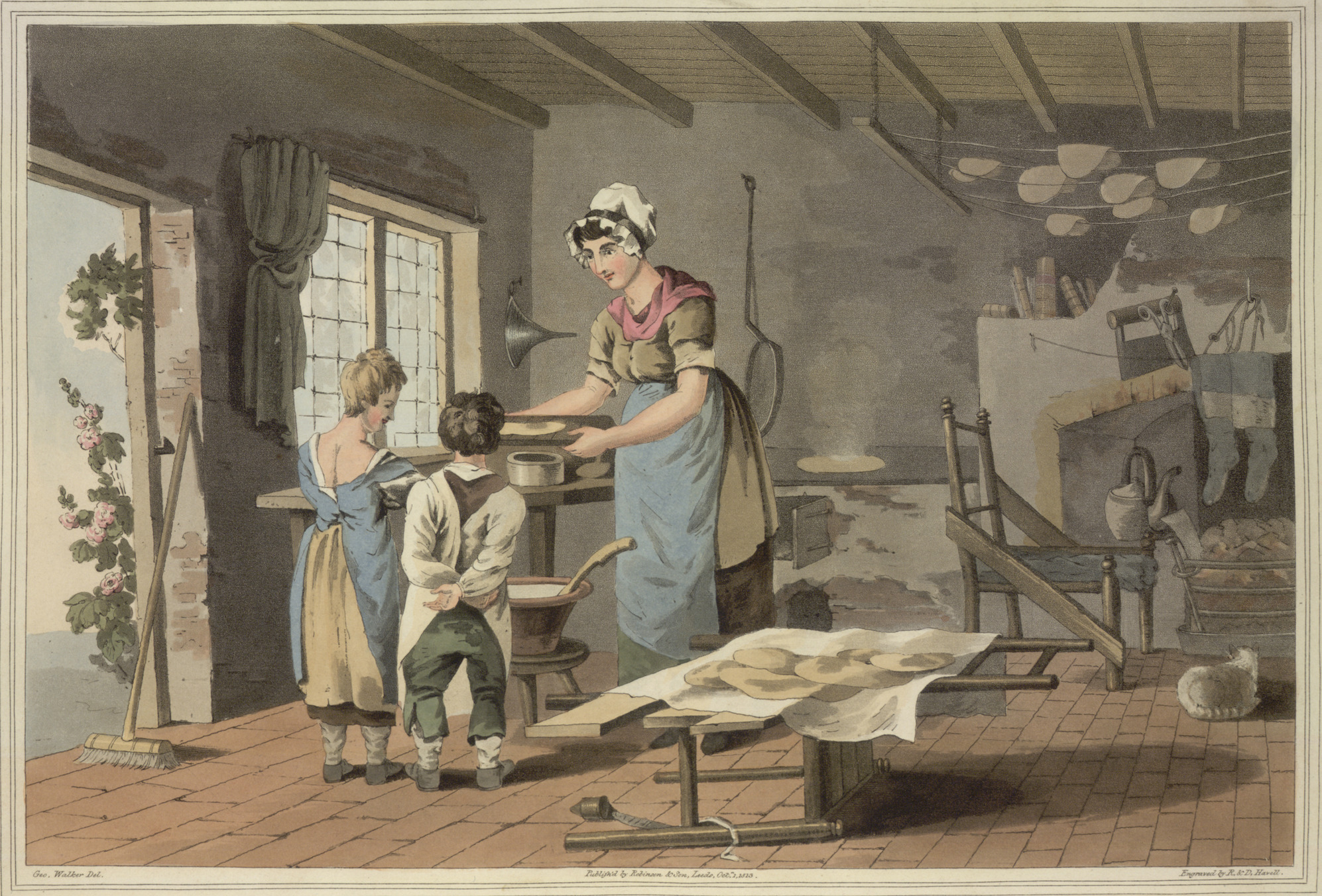
A painting of a woman making oat cakes, painted by George Walker (1781–1856). Image taken from The costume of Yorkshire

Oatcakes have been documented as existing in Caledonia (subsequently Scotland after the 9th century) since at least the time of the Roman conquest of Britain in AD 43, and likely before then. Oatcakes have also been described as being the "mainstay of Scottish breads for centuries". Jean Le Bel, around AD 1357–1360 describes the Beguine nuns making "little pancakes rather like communion wafers". This is thought to be an early description of a Scottish oatcake.

== Regional variations ==
Oatcake variations exist based upon the different preparations in various countries and regions.

=== Great Britain ===
Seen as a typically Scottish food item, oatcakes have also long been made elsewhere in Britain. Oatcakes may replace toast at breakfast in Scotland.

Queen Elizabeth II typically had Scottish oatcakes for breakfast and Walker's Oatcakes carry a Royal Warrant. British Prime Minister David Cameron named Scottish oatcakes as his favourite cake.

==== England ====
The Universal British Directory of Trade, Commerce and Manufacture of the 1790s notes the bread of High Furness being thin oatcakes, whilst in Lancashire a leavened oatcake known as riddle bread was made. The Staffordshire oatcake is quite different from those from Scotland, being more of a pancake in form, containing a significant proportion of wheat flour along with oatmeal. In Yorkshire, oatcakes are cooked from the bottom only, and the tops are bubbly in appearance.

The Duke of Wellington's Regiment was nicknamed the Havercakes due to their recruiting sergeants bearing oat cakes on the end of their swords.

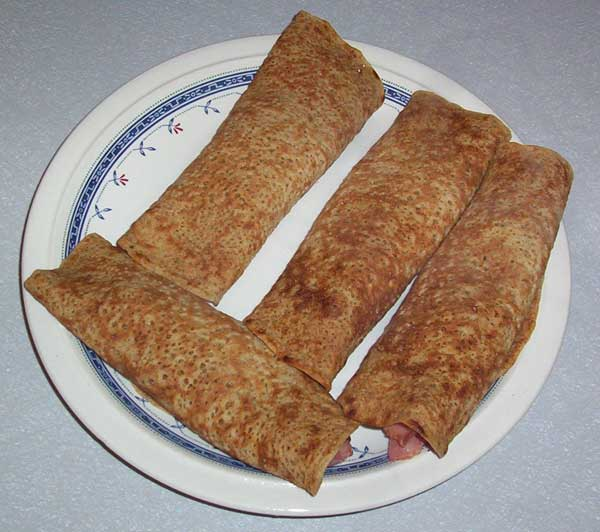
Staffordshire oatcakes

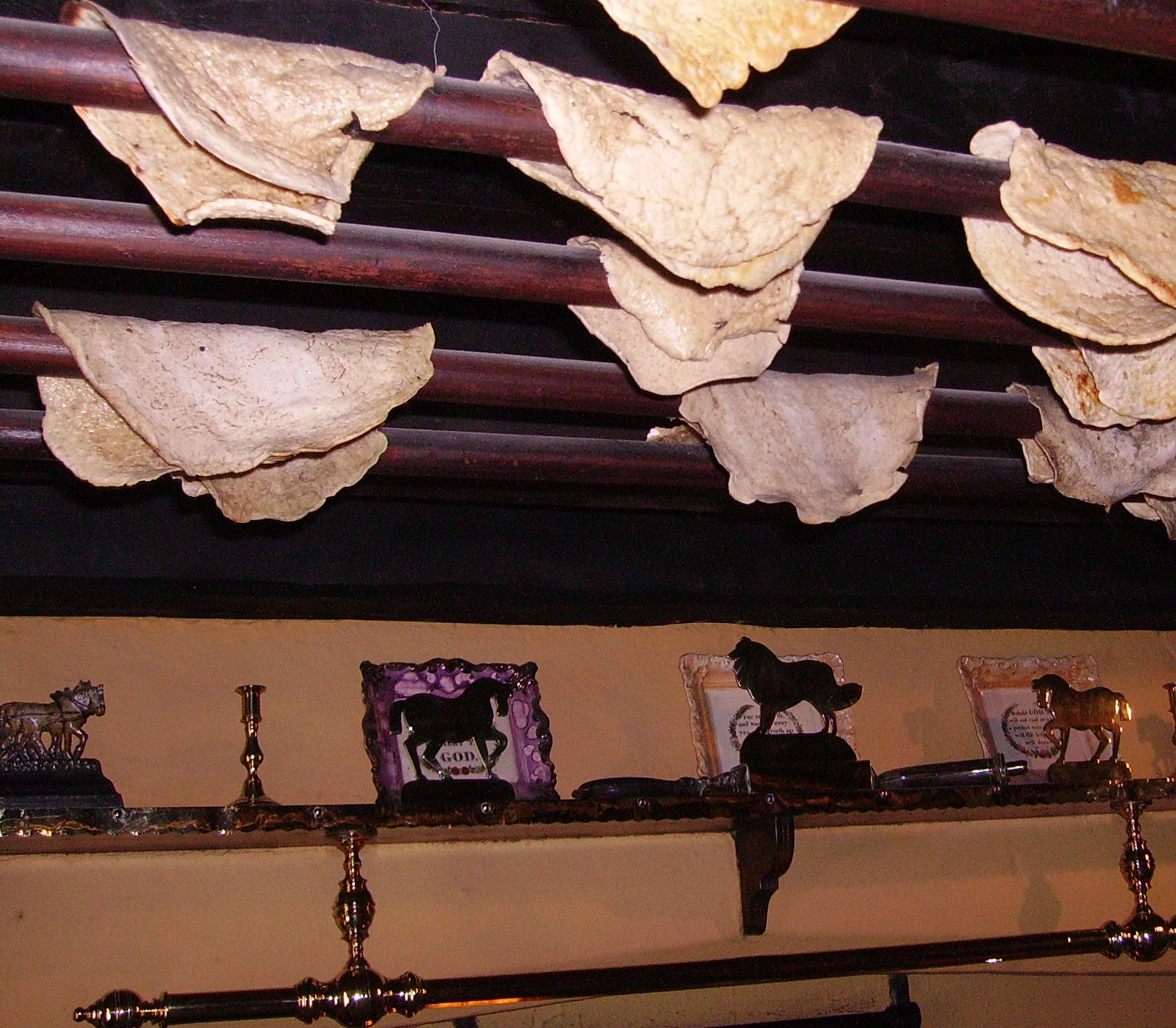
Oatcakes at the Beamish Museum in Beamish, County Durham, England

==== Scotland ====
In Scotland, oatcakes are made on a girdle (or griddle, in other forms of English) or by baking rounds of oatmeal on a tray. If the rounds are large, they are sliced into farls before baking. Oats are one of the few grains that grow well in the north of Scotland and were, until the 20th century, the staple grain eaten in that area.

Scottish soldiers in the 14th century carried a metal plate and a sack of oatmeal. According to contemporary accounts, a soldier would heat the plate over fire, moisten a bit of oatmeal and make a cake to "comfort his stomach. Hence it is no marvel that the Scots should be able to make longer marches than other men."

Samuel Johnson referred, disparagingly, to this staple diet in his dictionary definition for oats:

A grain, which in England is generally given to horses, but in Scotland supports the people.

Lord Elibank was said by Sir Walter Scott to have retorted

Yes, and where else will you see such horses and such men?

The texture may vary from rough to fine depending on how the oats are ground. Oatcakes may be slightly chewy or hard, depending on the water content and for how long they are cooked. Oatcakes were traditionally eaten with every meal as a major source of carbohydrate in the diet. From the 19th century onward, they were commonly served to accompany soups, meat, and fish dishes. Today, they are sometimes eaten as an alternative to bread or toast at breakfast.

Nowadays, many brands of oatcakes are commercially available, such as Nairn's, Stockan's, Paterson's, and Walker's. Apart from those larger commercial manufacturers of oatcakes, there are many local bakers providing variations on the basic recipe.

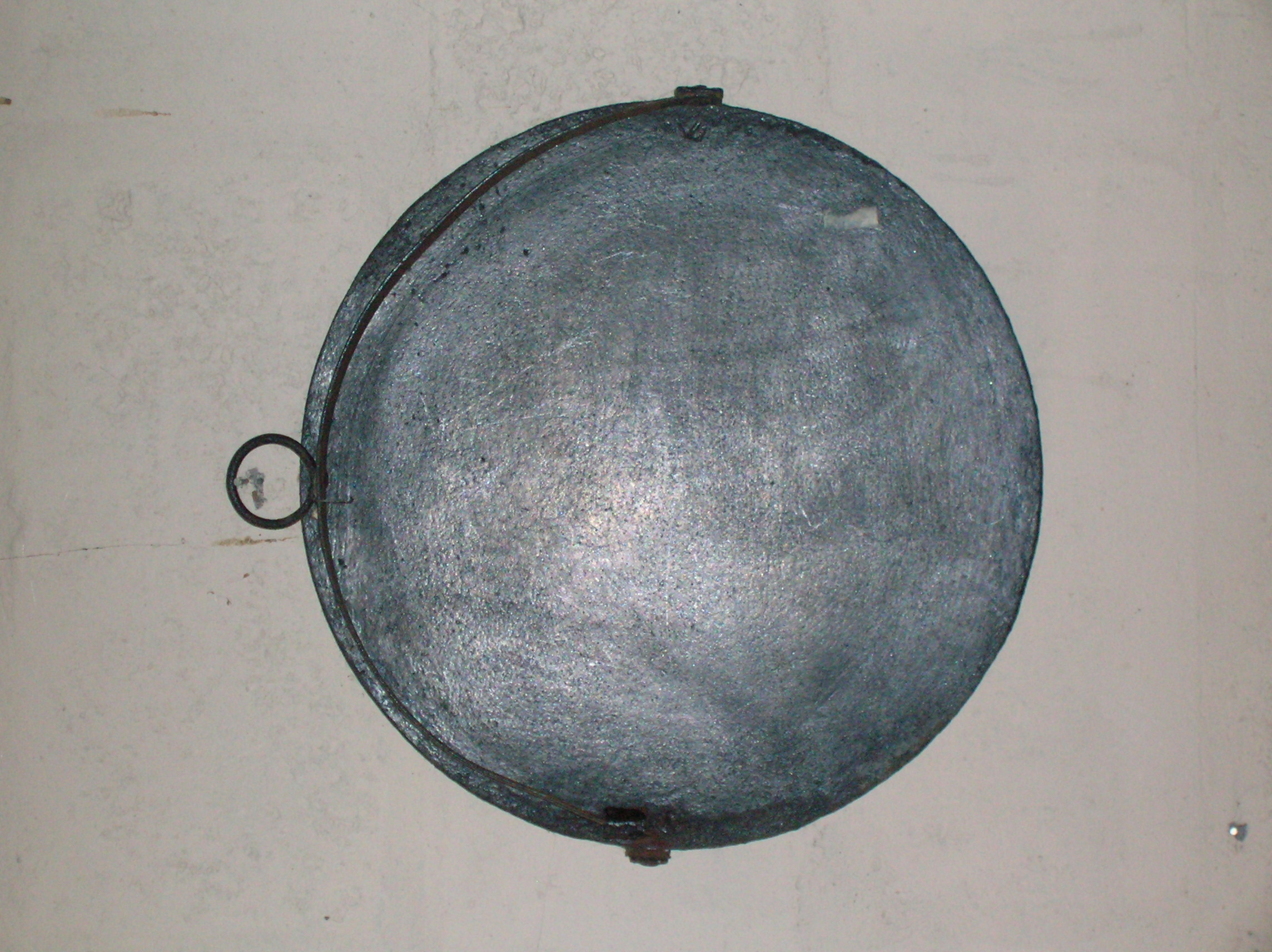
A girdle from Dalgarven Mill near Kilwinning in North Ayrshire, used for baking oatcakes and other foods such as bannocks

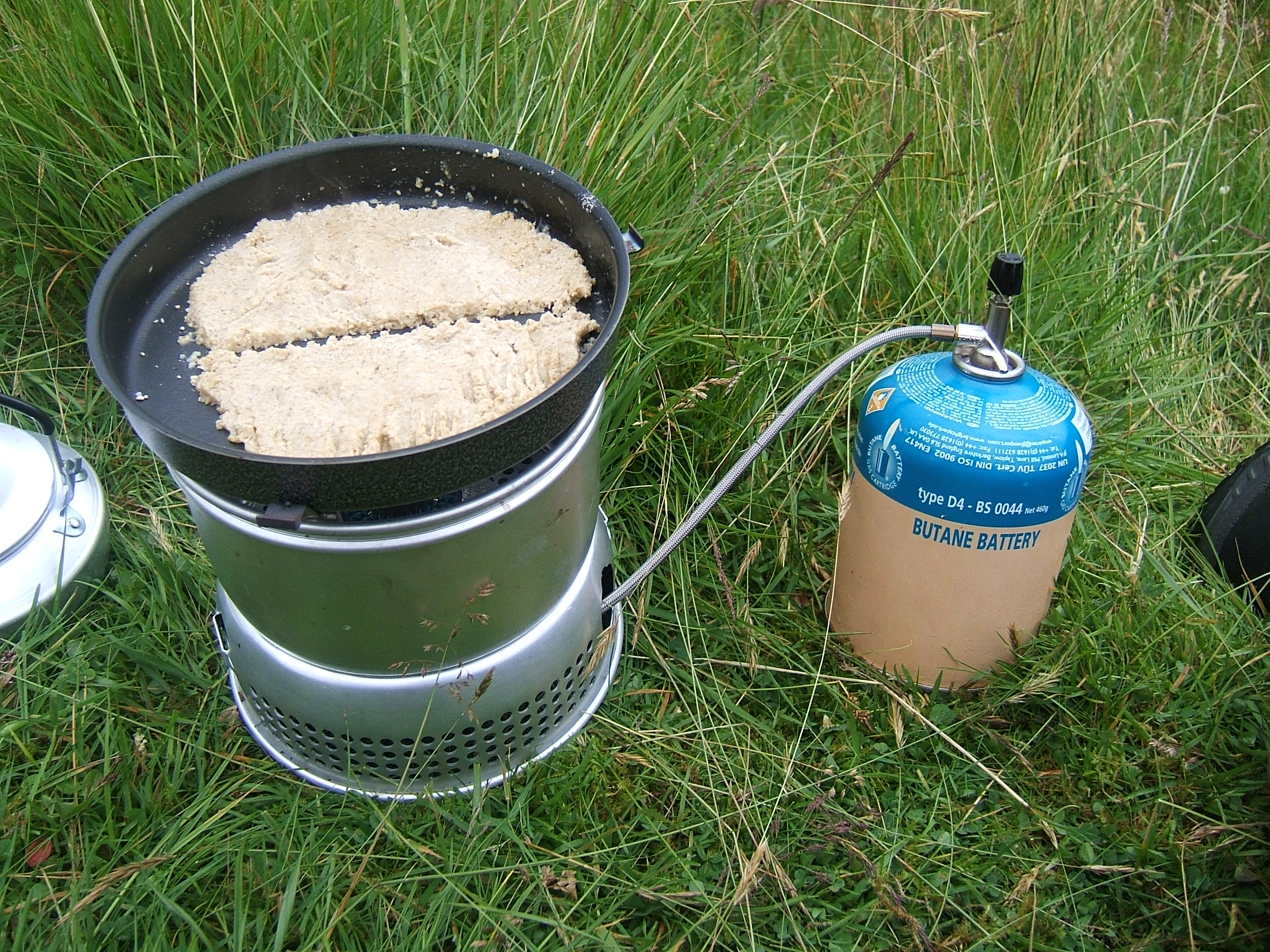
Oatcakes being cooked outdoors

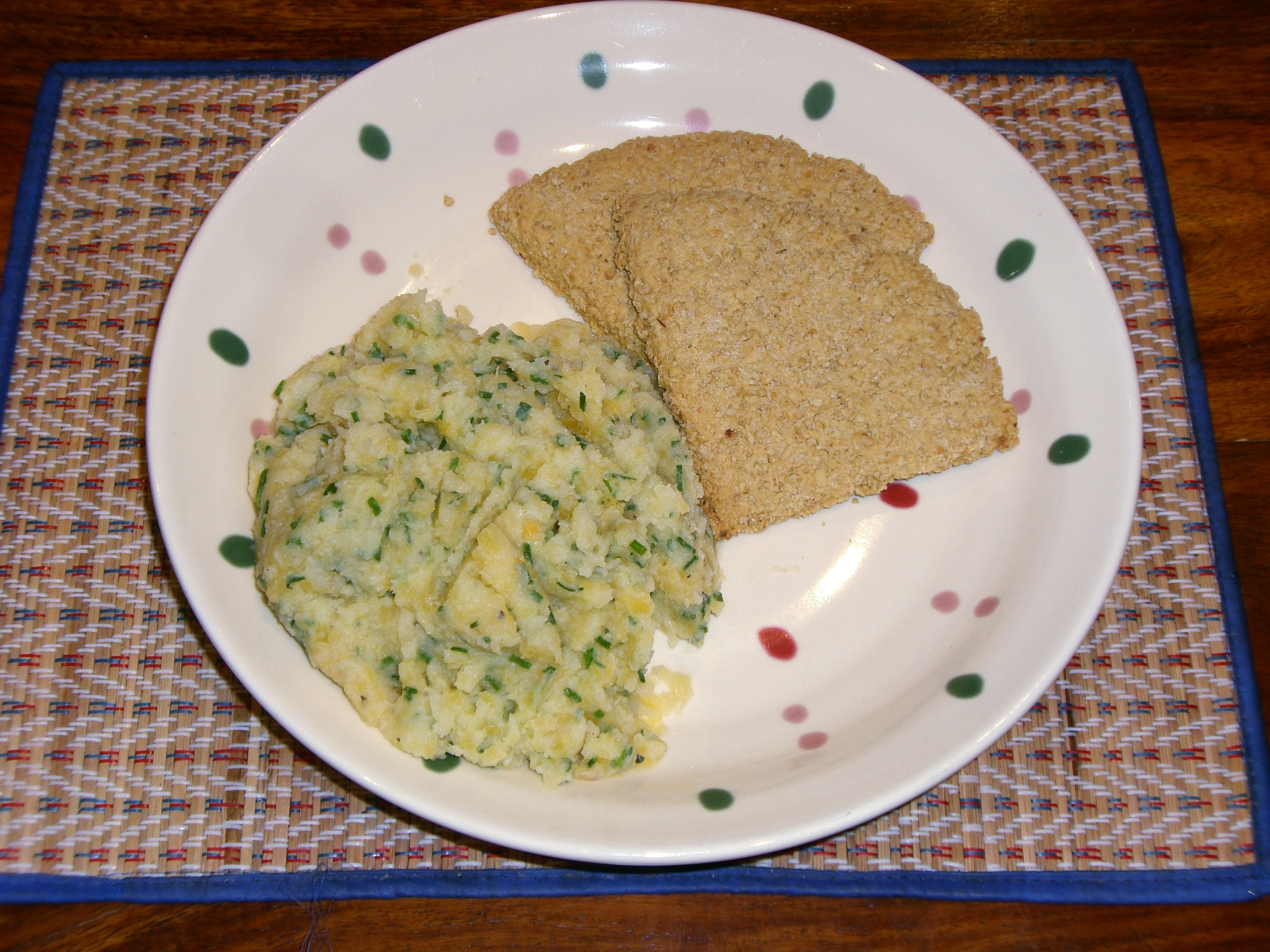
Oatcakes (top) with clapshot

==== Wales ====
In Wales, oatcakes (bara ceirch) tend to resemble savoury pancakes. They were sometimes crumbled up and used as one of the ingredients of Brŵes, a staple breakfast,, or served in a streetfood sandwich called Cocos a Wya (cockles and eggs), with fried cockles and eggs served between slices of thin oatcake.

=== Ireland ===
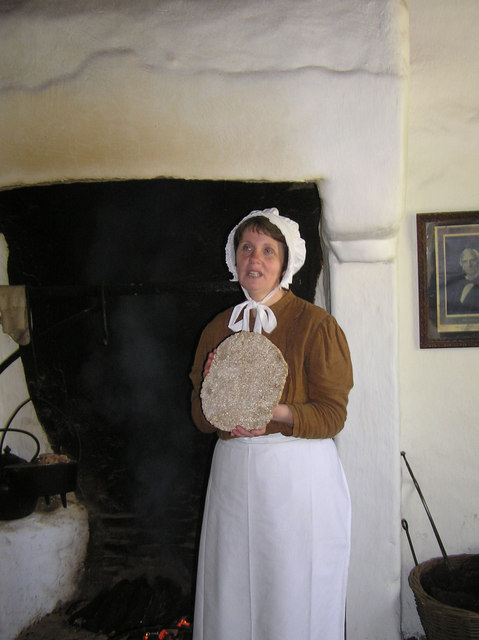
An oat cake being displayed by an employee of the Ulster American Folk Park, just outside Omagh, in County Tyrone, Northern Ireland, in a demonstration of their preparation

Oatcakes similar to the Scottish variety are produced in Ireland, in shared tradition with the Scots. Ditty's is a Northern Irish brand of oatcake.

=== Canada ===
Scottish immigrants to the New World brought the recipe for this sustaining food to Canada. One such journey was HMS Elizabeth, which brought immigrants to Prince Edward Island in 1775. Caught in a storm just off the coast of the island, the settlers and crew all survived and made it to the island in lifeboats, where they waited for three days for the storm to die down. When they returned to their ship to retrieve their possessions and provisions, they discovered that several barrels of oats were among the few foodstuffs that remained. The oats were full of sand and salt water, but that did not stop them from breaking out the frying pans and cooking oatcakes as their first meal in days. One settler wrote in his journal, "This I thought was the Sweetest morsel I ever Ate in my life though the Outside was burnt black and the middle was not half done".

Oatcakes in Canada gradually moved from being a mainstay of the diet to being a part of afternoon tea. Sweet and savoury versions were developed, to be served with jam or cheese respectively.

== See also ==
- Bannock
- Biscuit
- Hardtack
- List of British breads
- Meal Monday
- Rolled oats
- Scone
