= Pan loaf =

Style of bread loaf

- Type: Bread
- Place of origin: Scotland; Northern Ireland

A pan loaf is a style of bread loaf baked in a loaf pan or tin. It is the most common style available in the United Kingdom, though the term itself is predominantly Scottish and Northern Irish to differentiate it from the plain loaf. The pan loaf has a soft pale brown crust all around the bread, in contrast to a plain loaf's darker crust only at the top and bottom.

== Idiomatic usage ==
A pan loaf was once more expensive than the then more common plain loaf. Therefore, in Scots and Scottish English, to speak with a pan loafy voice is to speak in a posh or affected manner, e.g. the distinctive accents of Kelvinside, Glasgow and Morningside, Edinburgh.
