= Cottage loaf =

Type of bread

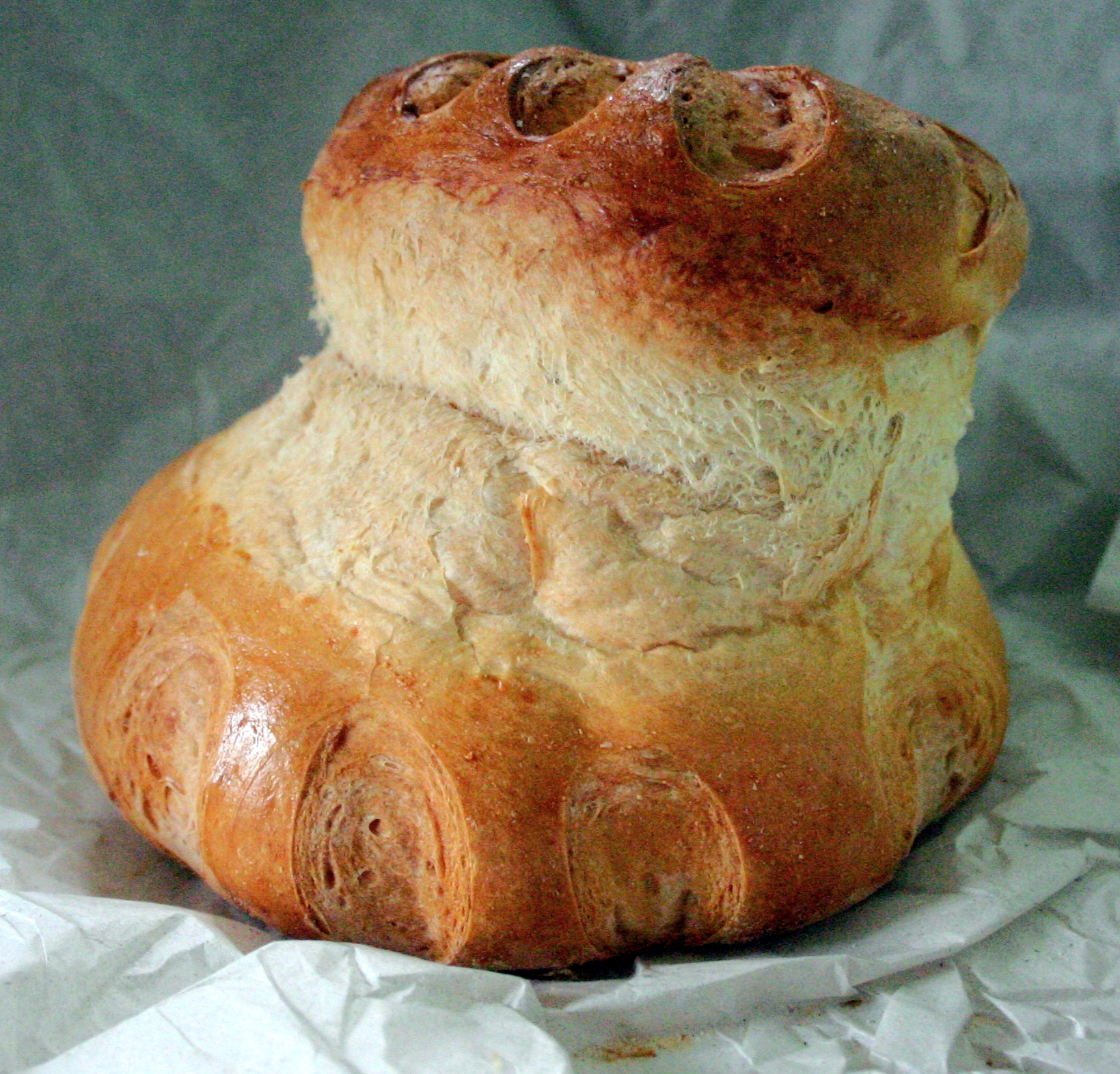
- A small cottage loaf baked in a traditional bakery in Rochester, Kent
- Type: Bread
- Place of origin: England

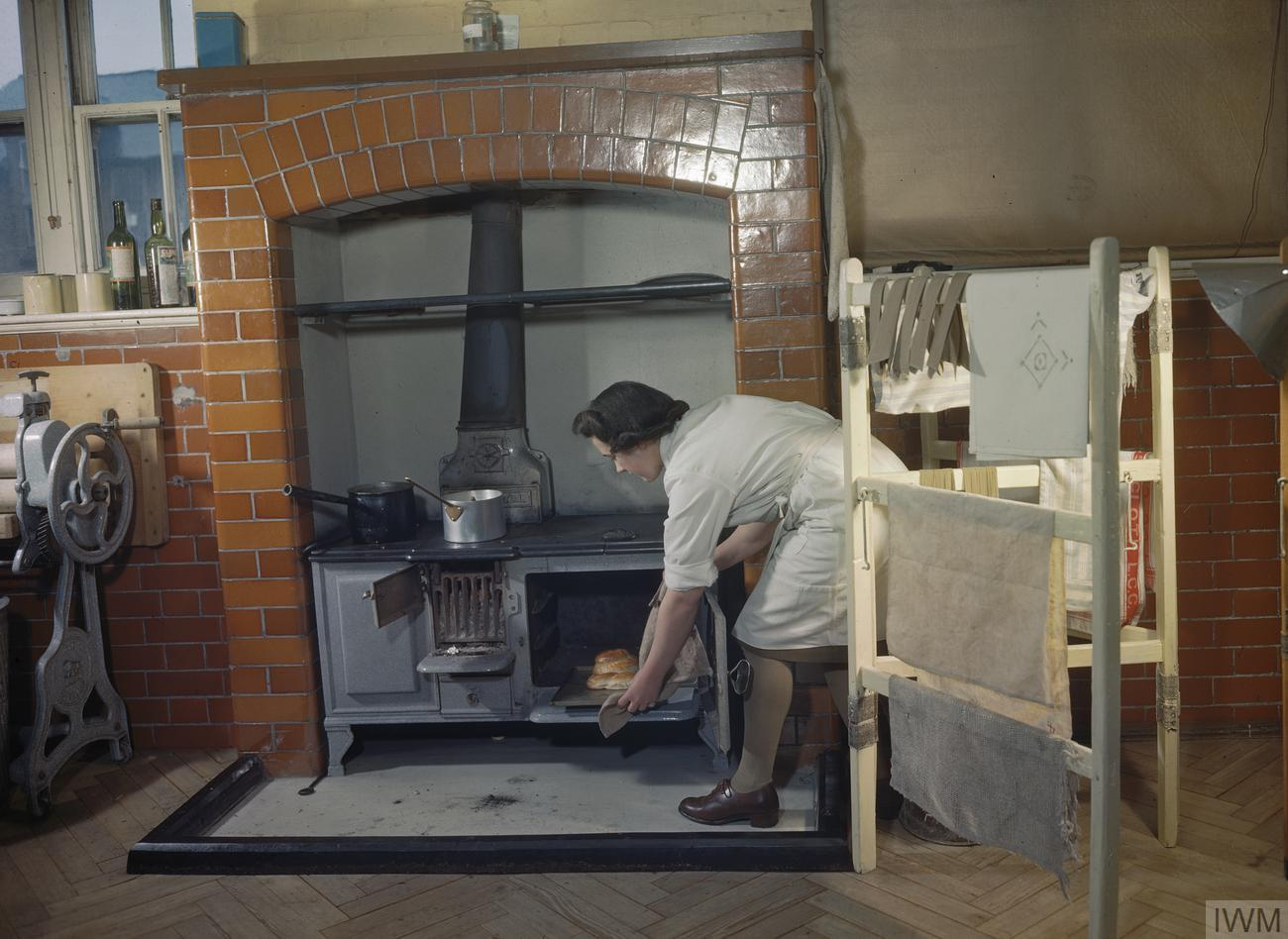
A baker removing a cottage loaf from the oven during World War II in Britain

A cottage loaf is a traditional type of bread originating in England.

The loaf is characterised by its shape, which is essentially that of two round loaves, one on top of the other, with the upper one being smaller: the shape is similar to that of the French brioche à tête and the pain chapeau of Finistère.

The origins of the name and shape are unknown but possibly extend back hundreds of years. Elizabeth David, who described the cottage loaf in her English Bread and Yeast Cookery, surmised that the shape may have arisen as a way of saving 'floor space' in old-fashioned bread ovens. The name, however, did not first appear in writing until the mid-nineteenth century. It was formerly possible to find an oblong version, known as a "cottage brick", and common in the London area.

Cottage loaves, while formerly common, are now rarely found in bakeries, as they are relatively time-consuming and difficult to make, and in common with other round loaves are less convenient for slicing into consistent sizes.

== See also ==
- List of British breads
