= Barm cake =

Type of bread roll

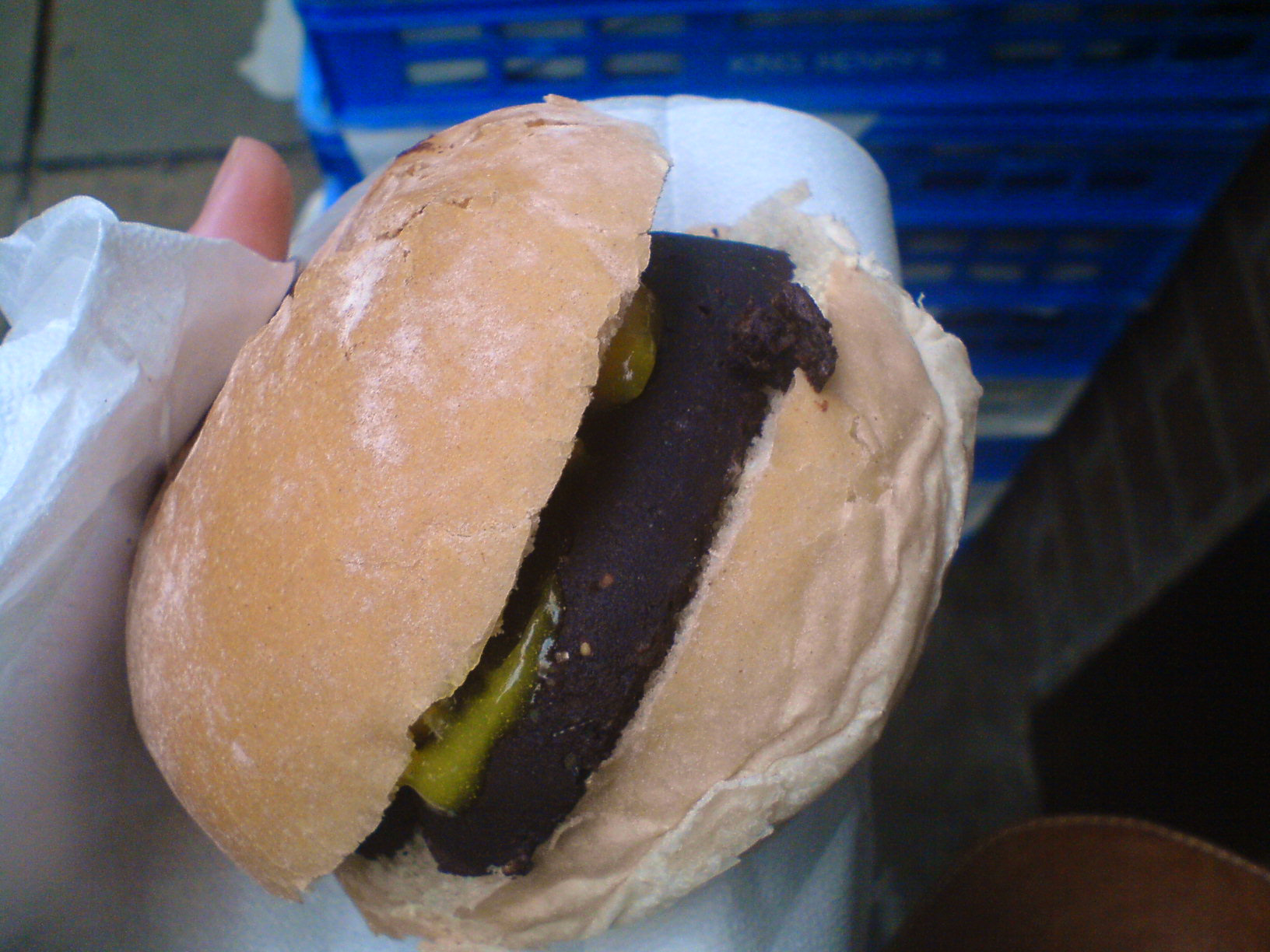
- Barm cake with melted butter and black pudding
- Type: Bread
- Place of origin: England
- Region or state: Historical Lancashire
- Main ingredients: Barm

A barm cake is a soft, round, flattish bread from North West England, traditionally leavened with barm.

Bacon is often the filling for a barm cake, whether served at home or in cafes or bakers in Lancashire.

Chips are also a popular filling, sold in most fish and chip shops in the North West of England and often called a chip barm. Another popular filling in the North West, particularly Bolton, is a pasty barm. In Wigan, a whole savoury pie is served in a barm cake, traditionally known locally as a "pie barm" or "slappy". More recently it is known as a "Wigan kebab", including on the menu of the local football team Wigan Athletic.

== See also ==
- Chip butty
- Kaiser roll
- Stottie cake
