= Staffordshire oatcake =

Savoury pancake from England

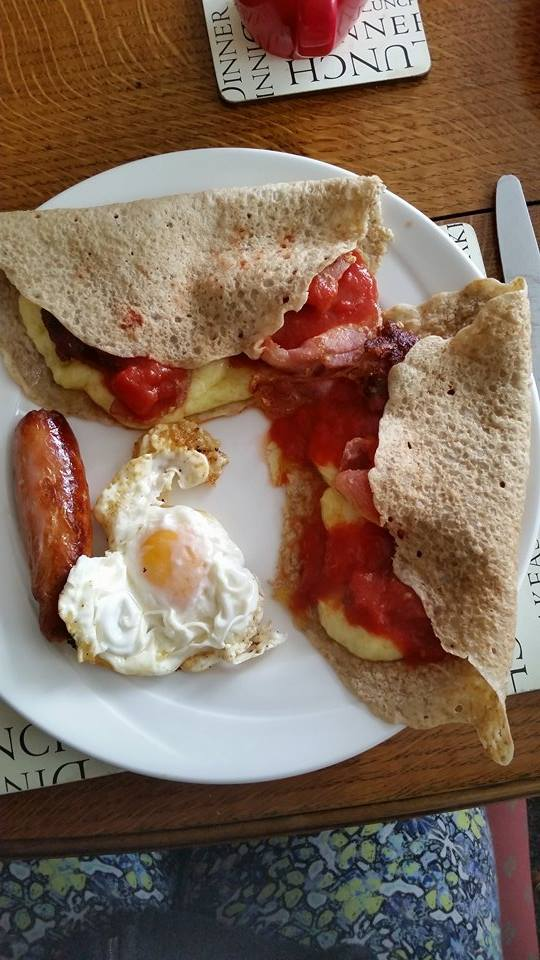
- A breakfast consisting of two Staffordshire oatcakes filled with cheese, tomatoes, and back bacon, served with a fried egg and a sausage
- Type: Pancake
- Place of origin: England
- Region or state: Staffordshire
- Main ingredients: Oatmeal

A Staffordshire oatcake is a type of dense, savoury pancake made from oatmeal, flour and yeast. It is cooked on a griddle, "backstone" or "baxton". The oatcake is a local speciality in the north Staffordshire area of England. They are normally referred to as Staffordshire oatcakes by non-locals, because they are made in and around Staffordshire and Cheshire; locally they are simply called "oatcakes".

== History ==
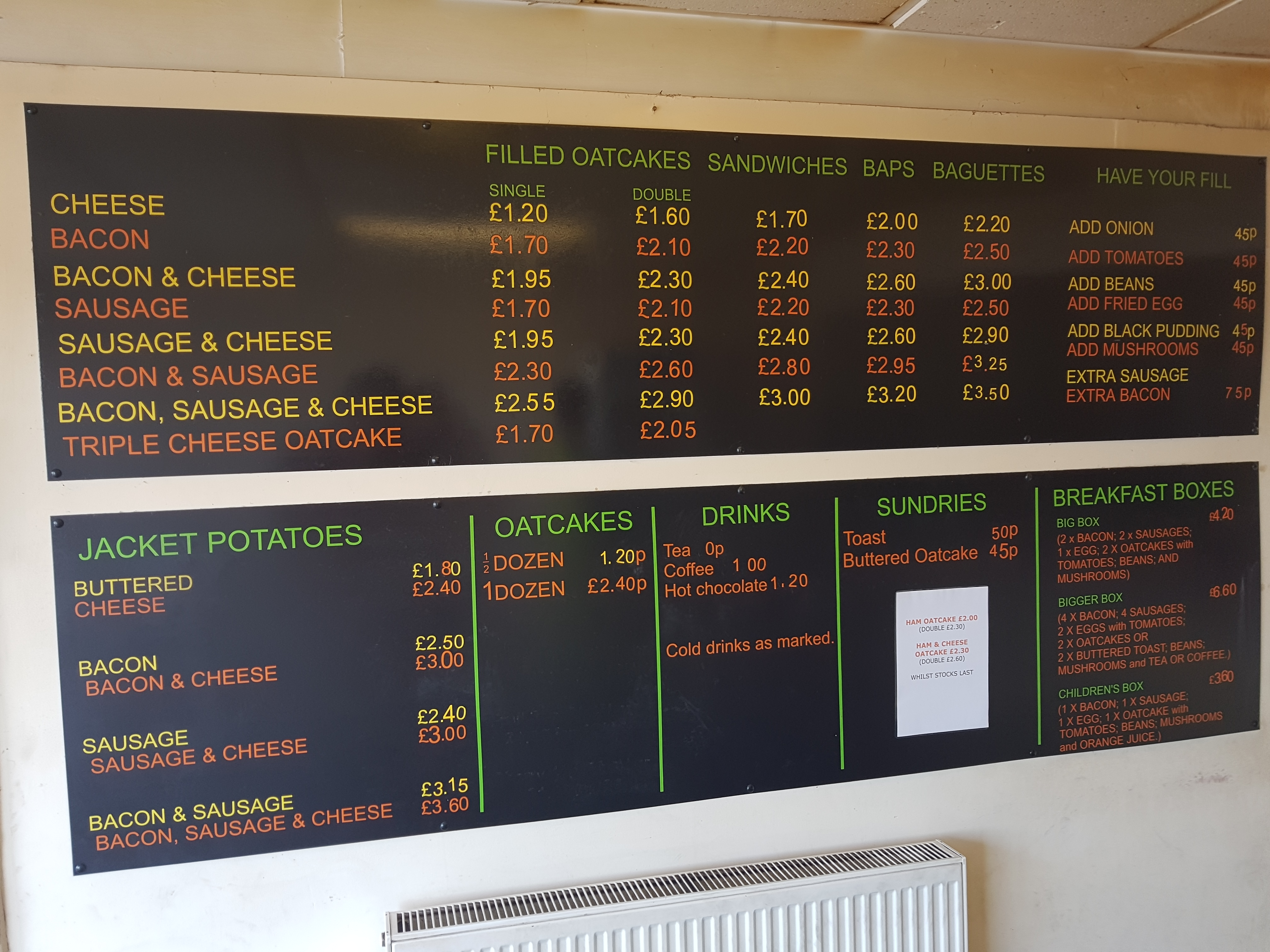
Oatcake shop menu in Fenton, Stoke-on-Trent, Staffordshire, 2019

It was once common throughout the Potteries for oatcakes to be sold directly from the window of a house to customers on the street. The last producer in this style, the "Hole in the Wall" in Stoke-on-Trent, closed for a time on 25 March 2012, but opened again a few years later, in 2019; however, there are many small commercial premises who sell oatcakes, either ready to eat, with a filling, or in batches of half a dozen or a dozen for the customer to take home. Larger commercial enterprises exist that sell oatcakes to supermarkets and other large distribution chains.

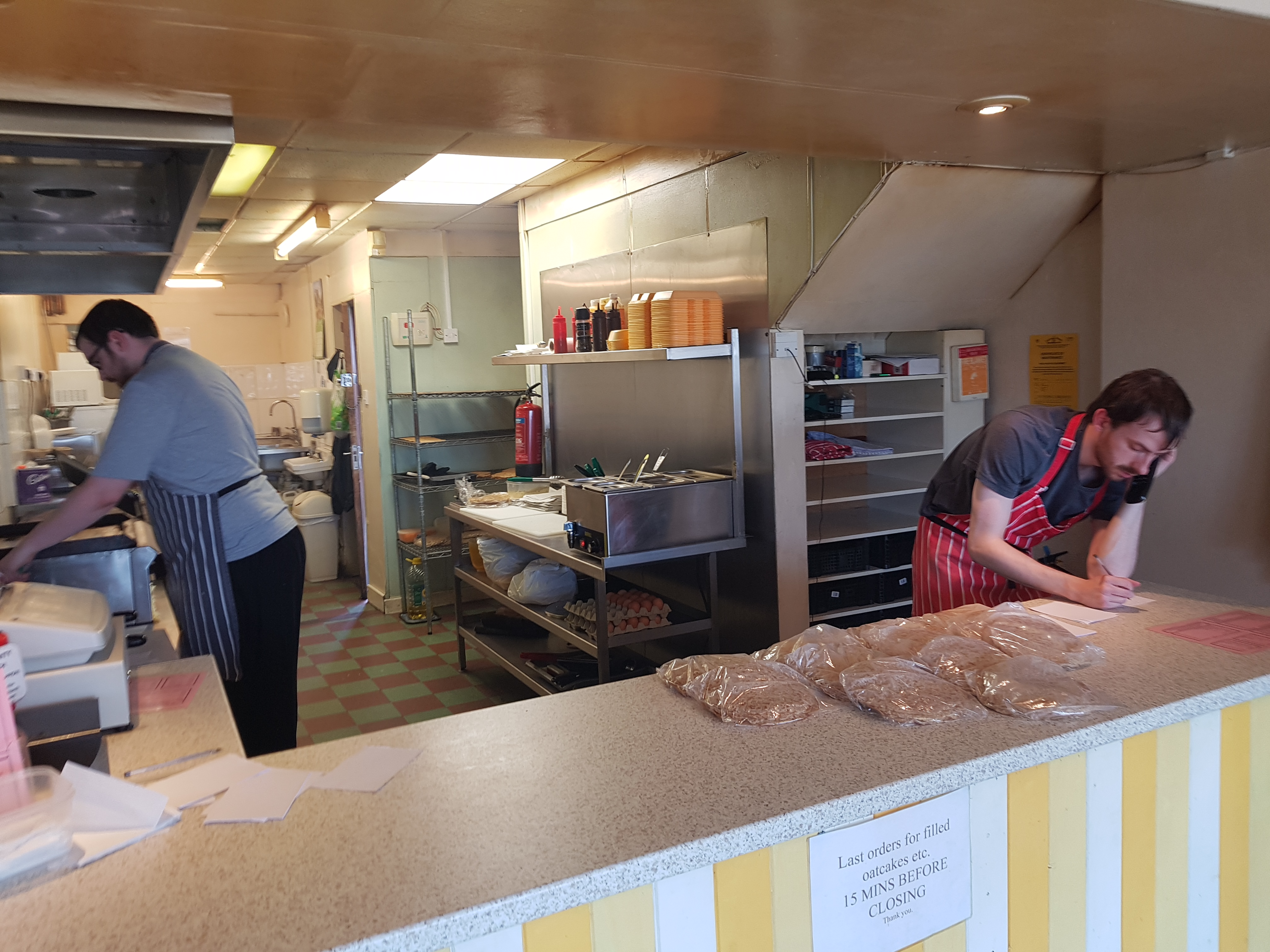
Oatcake shop interior in Fenton, Stoke-on-Trent, Staffordshire, 2019

Oatcakes can be a form of fast food. Catering outlets in the area usually offer oatcakes with fillings such as cheese, baked beans, tomato, bacon, sausage, and egg. They can also be eaten with sweet fillings such as golden syrup, jam or banana, but this is less common and frowned upon by traditionalists. They are traditionally re-heated by steaming between two plates over a saucepan of water or nowadays by microwave, though some may prefer frying in butter or grilling.

The Staffordshire oatcake is not to be confused with the Scottish oatcake (biscuit); although both are made from oatmeal, the two types of oatcakes are very different. The Staffordshire oatcake dates back to the 19th century where it was baked on a hotplate over an open fire.

== Regional variants ==
=== Derbyshire oatcakes ===
Derbyshire oatcakes are similar to Staffordshire oatcakes, but while following a similar recipe Derbyshire oatcakes contains a small amount of milk in the mixture. they are generally larger in diameter, thicker and when uncooked lighter in colour. For example, a recipe that would make four Derbyshire oatcakes might generally make twelve of the Staffordshire. There are some sources which have suggested that the thicker, puffier and milky oatcake of Derbyshire was a form of one-upmanship to make it appear that Derbyshire was more prosperous although there is scant literary support for any such reasoning. Despite this, there has been a long standing rivalry between who came up with the oatcake first.

=== Lancashire and Yorkshire oatcakes ===
A Lancashire oatcake bears a passing resemblance to a Derbyshire oatcake, but is made without wheat flour or milk, and shaped as an approximate 11-by-6-inch (28 cm × 15 cm) oval, smooth on one side and rough on the other, and traditionally cooked on a bakestone. It may be eaten moist, rolled up like a pancake with a filling, or dried hung over a rack until a crisp cracker. The dried version served with a beef and cowheel stew is known as "stew and hard". Once common throughout Lancashire, it is now rarely found. The same cake is also cooked in West Yorkshire and Craven, and is thus sometimes referred to as the Pennine oatcake, although in Yorkshire the recipe often incorporated approximately 20% buttermilk.

In Lancashire and Yorkshire, oatcake was a staple of the diet up to around 1910 Up to the 18th century, oatcakes were often called "havercakes", from hafr, the Old Germanic word for oats, but that name only continued to be used in the North Riding of Yorkshire and Teesside for a different kind of oatcake that is thick with no yeast. The word is perpetuated in the nickname "The Havercake Lads" for the 33rd Regiment of Foot and also in the term haversack.

==== Cooking equipment ====
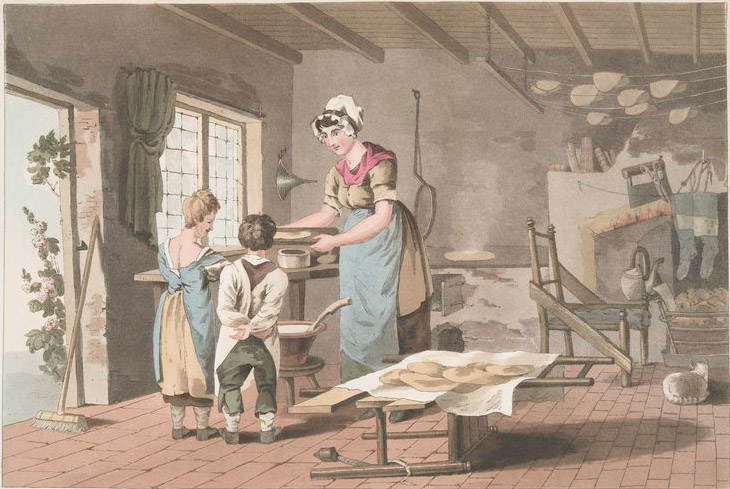
This Yorkshire cook is spreading the batter on the riddleboard by a circular horizontal movement. Behind her is the built-in bakstone and to its right hangs the bread flake.

In Lancashire and the West Riding of Yorkshire the griddle was called a bakstone. Originally a bakstone was a portable flat oval flaggy sandstone approximately 1.5-inch (3.8 cm) thick, set on an open fire. In the 19th century these were replaced with a cast-iron plate with a hooped handle, yet the name remained unchanged. In large houses they were built in next to the chimney, with a firebox under an iron plate that was approximately 3-foot (91 cm) by 1.5-foot (46 cm), or in larger houses a pair of 2-foot (61 cm) square plates.

In the 18th century the batter was mixed in a small wooden bucket which was not cleaned, so that the particles on the sides acted as a fermenting agent for the next baking. In the 19th century, the use of baker's yeast and porcelain containers or enamel pails became standard.

The size of the ladle varied relative to the current cost of oatmeal; for many decades, oatcakes were by tradition one penny each, or 18 for a shilling.

Before ca. 1860, the method was called "thrown oatcakes" or "riddlebread". The baker sifted oatmeal onto the "riddleboard", poured on a ladleful of batter, and then, with a circular horizontal movement, spread and leveled the batter. It was then slid onto a piece of linen covering the "spittle" board, a board with a handle. The cake was thereby "thrown" (flipped) on to the bakstone and then the linen taken up.

Baking racks were contrived by turning a chair on its side and covering the legs with a white cloth.

Oatcakes made for drying were left until crisp on a fixture called the bread flake. Flake, pronounced "fleeak", is from the Old Norse fleki meaning a hurdle. Flakes in Wharfedale had wooden laths; one at Ling House measured 10.5-foot (3.2 m) by 4.5-foot (1.4 m) with 23 cross bars. Those in upper Ribblesdale had strings, over two of which each cake was laid. In some areas the rack was called a bread creel.

== Oatcake Day ==
Stoke-on-Trent held an Oatcake Day event on Sunday, 8 August 2010. This led to other associated events such as "Oatcake Camp".

== See also ==
- Oatcake
- Staffordshire Potteries
- List of British breads
