= Plain loaf =

Traditional style of loaf

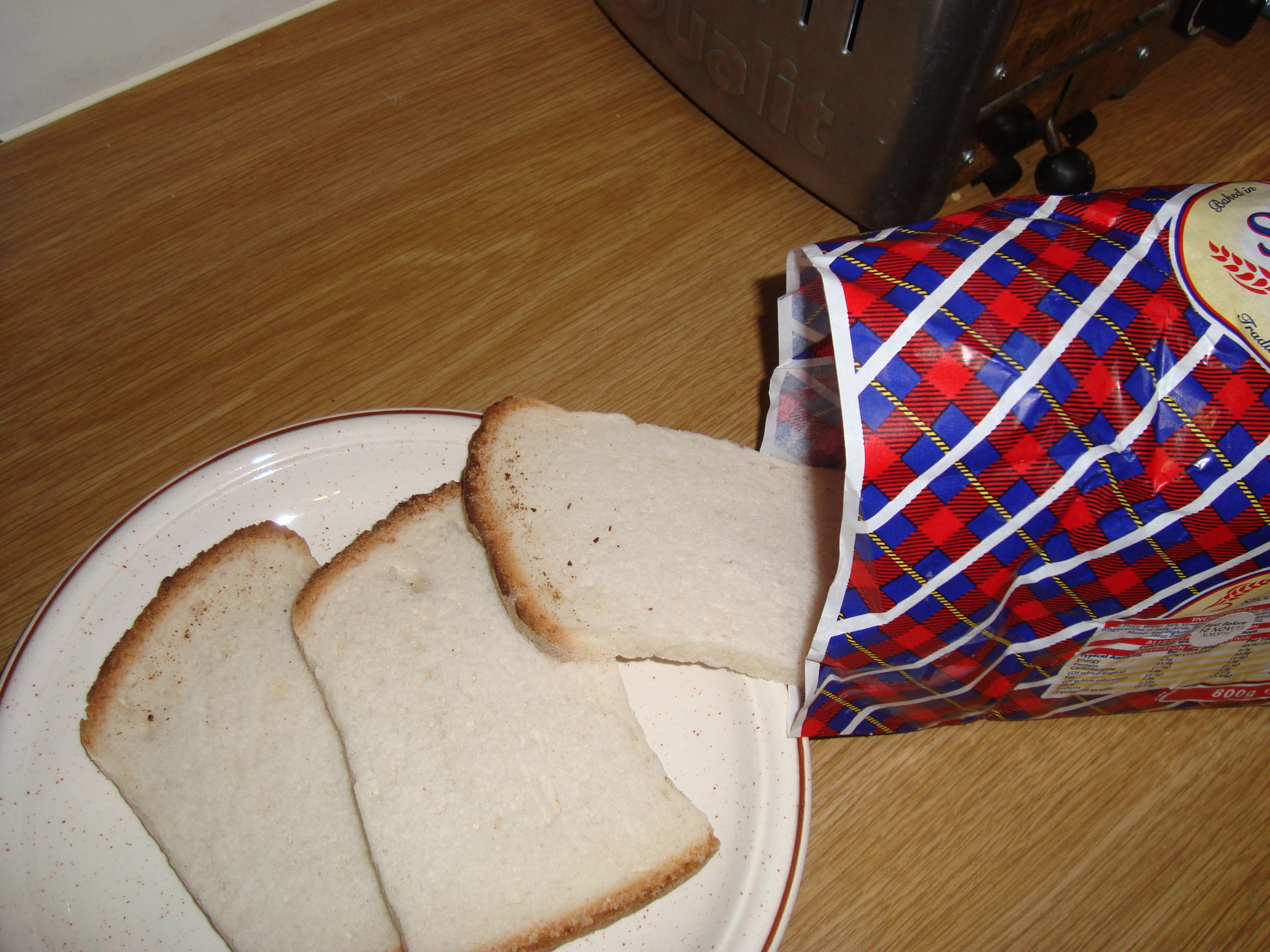
- A bag of Mother's Pride plain loaf
- Alternative names: Plain bread
- Type: Bread
- Place of origin: Scotland

A plain loaf, slices of which are known in Scots as plain breid (pronounced [plen brid]), is a traditional style of loaf made chiefly in Scotland and Ireland. It has a dark, well-fired crust on the top and bottom of the bread.

There is no crust on the sides due to the unbaked loaves being stuck together in batches, baked together then torn into individual loaves afterwards. The term batch loaf is sometimes used. This was once the more widely available style of loaf in comparison to the now more common pan loaf.

== See also ==
- List of breads
- List of British breads
