= Scuffler =

Type of bread from West Yorkshire, England

- Type: Bread roll
- Place of origin: Britain
- Region or state: Yorkshire

A scuffler is a large bread cake. This word in Yorkshire dialect originates from the Pontefract, Featherstone and Castleford area of West Yorkshire. This bread is always baked in rounds, and scored so it can be torn into a roughly triangular shape once baked. It is similar to the Northumbrian stottie, but lighter.

Scufflers often have a small amount of flour on the top.

== See also ==
- List of bread rolls
