= Stottie cake =

Type of bread from North East England

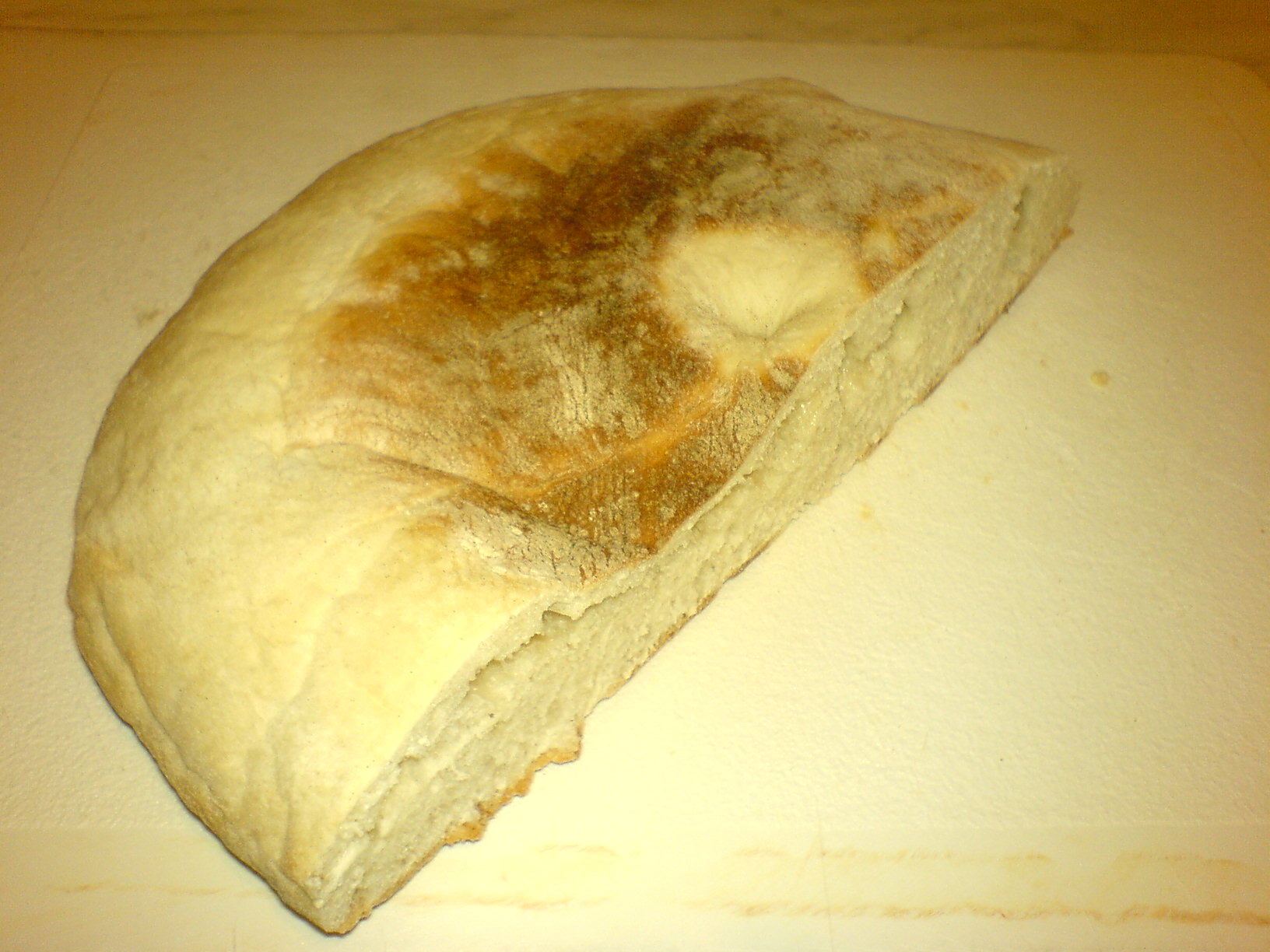
- Alternative names: Stotty
- Type: Bread
- Place of origin: England
- Region or state: Northumberland and County Durham

A stottie/stotty (cake) is a type of bread from North East England.

== Physical description ==
It has an uneven round flat shape, with a diameter of about 200 millimetres (8 in) and a depth of about 25 millimetres (1 in). It sometimes has a small hole or indentation near the centre. It weighs about 270 grams (10 oz). Its colour is mostly white, with patches of brown. It has a crusty and/or fluffy texture.

== Cooking method ==
The dough is often made the same way as normal white bread (containing fat, not French- or Italian-style). Stottie dough may be made by combining excess dough through kneading and rolling.

The dough only gets one rise instead of two. For example, it may be baked as follows:

1. The dough is divided into parts that are formed into large discs.
2. A hole or indent is made in the center of each disc.
3. These discs of dough are proved.
4. The discs are baked on the bottom of the oven at 200 °C (392 °F) for 15 minutes.
5. The discs are rotated and baked at a slightly lower temperature for 15 more minutes.

== Usage ==
It is often used to make sandwiches by separating it horizontally and putting toppings such as ham, bacon, sausage, mushrooms, or fried egg, and butter, pease pudding, or ketchup inside.

== History ==
The name may have come from the North-Eastern/Geordie word stot '(to) bounce' (the root of the word "stotting"), perhaps due to how the dough was thrown, or stotted, onto the bottom of the oven.

The bread has been made since at least before WWII.

== Other names and related concepts ==
- Oven-bottom cake (Yorkshire)
- Scuffler (Yorkshire) - also known as New Cake
- Fadge (Scotland, Ireland, Northumberland, and Lancashire)
- Hearth-breads (Italy and France)

== See also ==
- List of bread rolls
- List of British breads
