= List of bread rolls =

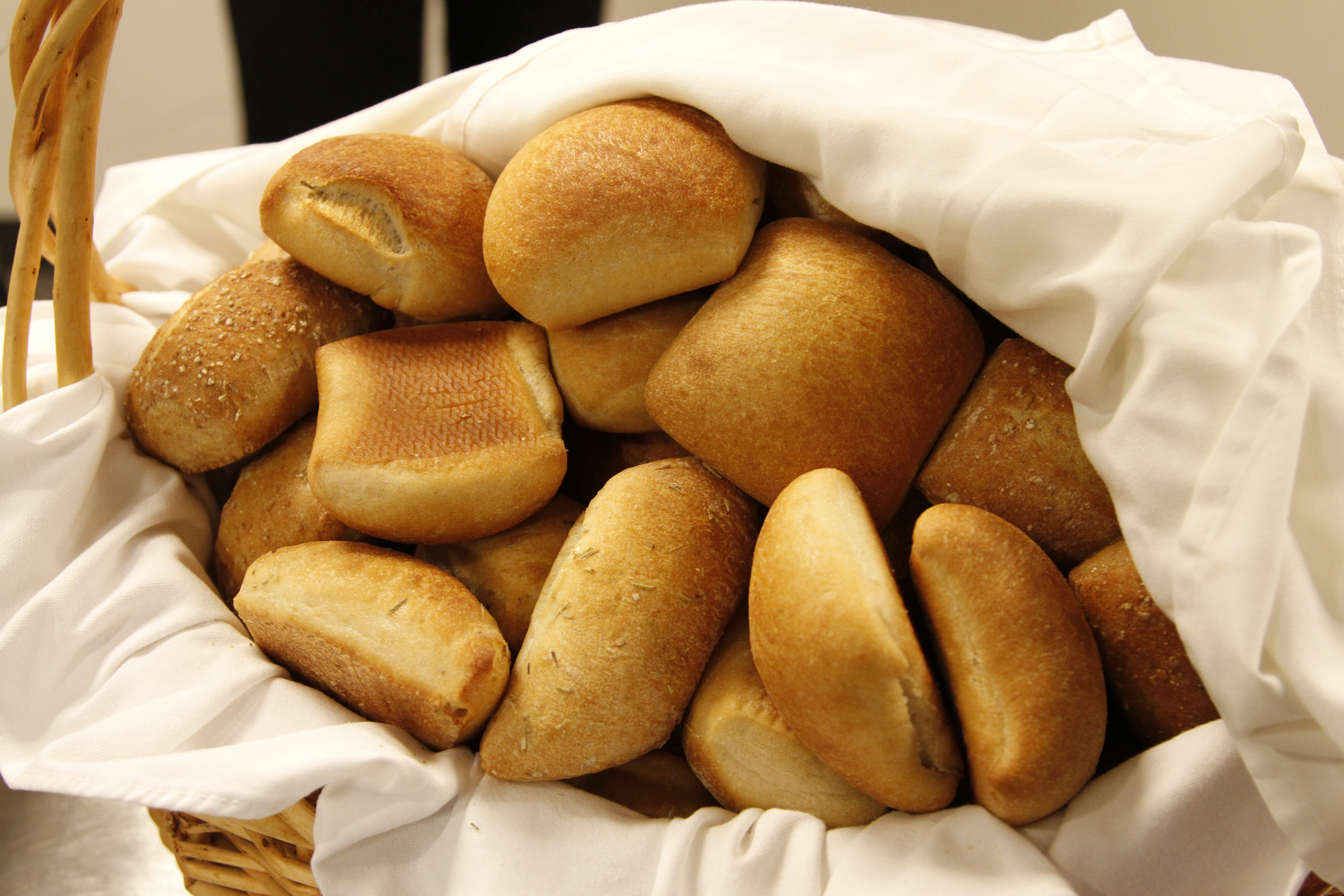
Bread rolls in a basket

A bread roll is a small, often round loaf of bread served as a meal accompaniment, eaten plain or with butter. A roll can be served and eaten whole or cut transversely and dressed with filling between the two halves. Rolls are also commonly used to make sandwiches similar to those produced using slices of bread. A bun is a type of bread or bread roll, sometimes sweet. Buns come in many shapes and sizes, but are most commonly hand-sized or smaller, with a round top and flat bottom. The items listed here include both bread rolls and buns.

There are many names for bread rolls and buns, especially in local dialects of British English. The different terms originated from bakers, based on how they made the dough and how the items were cooked. Over time, people tend to use one name to refer to all similar products, regardless of whether or not it is technically correct by the original definitions.

== A ==
- Asado roll – Filipino bread roll with savory-sweet pork asado filling
- Anpan – A bun that is filled, usually with red bean paste, or with white beans, sesame, or chestnut

== B ==
- Bagel – a ring-shaped bun originating in the Jewish communities of Poland that is traditionally made from yeasted wheat dough which is shaped by hand into a torus or ring, briefly boiled in water, and then baked, resulting in a dense, chewy, doughy interior with a browned and sometimes crisp exterior.
- Bakpao – Indonesian term for steamed bun. The bun is usually filled with ground pork, but can instead be filled with other ingredients, such as mung bean paste, ground peanuts, or vegetables.
- Bánh bao – Vietnamese meaning "Enveloping Cake", which is a ball-shaped bun containing pork or chicken meat, onions, eggs, mushrooms and vegetables, in the Vietnamese cuisine
- Baozi – A type of steamed, filled bun or bread-like item made with baker's yeast in various Chinese cuisines, as there is much variation as to the fillings and the preparations
- Barm or barm cake or flour cake – flat, often floured, savoury, small bread made using a natural leaven including mashed hops to stop it souring; a term often used in Liverpool, Manchester, South Lancashire and West Lancashire.
- Bap – a large soft roll of the British Isles roughly 5–6 inches (12–15 cm) in diameter. May contain fats such as lard or butter to provide tenderness. It can come in multiple shapes, depending on the region. Baps, as traditionally made in Scotland, are not sweet, unlike the Irish version, which may contain currants. The 9th Edition of the "Concise Oxford Dictionary" (1995) states that the word "bap" dates back to the 16th century and that its origin is unknown.
- Batch (generally the same as a bap) – term used in Warwickshire and Cheshire in England, especially around Coventry and the Wirral.
- Bath bun – A rich and round sweet roll that has a lump of sugar baked in the bottom and more crushed sugar sprinkled on top after baking
- Beef bun – A type of Hong Kong pastry; one of the most standard pastries in Hong Kong and can also be found in most Chinatown bakery shops; has a ground beef filling, sometimes including pieces of onions
- Belfast bap – white bread roll with a dark top, often "crusty, like tiger bread."
- Belgian bun – A sweet bun containing sultanas and usually topped with fondant icing and half a glace cherry
- Blaa – A dough-like, white bread bun (roll) speciality particularly associated with Waterford, Ireland; Historically, the blaa is also believed to have been made in Kilkenny and Wexford
- Boston bun – A large spiced bun with a thick layer of coconut icing, prevalent in Australia and New Zealand
- Bread roll – A short, oblong, or round bun served usually before or with meals, often with butter.
- Breadcake – term used in Yorkshire and Annesley in North Nottinghamshire
- Breakfast roll – (chiefly Irish) a bread roll usually filled with elements of a traditional fry (fried Irish breakfast foods).
- Bublik
- Bulkie roll – type of roll with a crust that is usually slightly crisp or crunchy and has no toppings.
- Bun kebab – A spicy Pakistani patty which is shallow-fried, onions, and chutney or raita in a hot dog bun
- Bun – term for a bread roll, bread batch, or bread barm cake, primarily used in Northern England and in much of Canada.
- Buñuelo — A fried dough ball originated in Spain from Arab tradition and now also popular in Hispanic America, Greece, Guam, Turkey, Morocco and Israel brought by the Sephardic Jews. It will usually be flavoured with anise and have a filling or a topping.
- Butterflake roll – a New England originated roll made of several layers of dough oriented vertically and separated by thin butter layers. When cooked in a muffin cup, the layers fan out at the top. Also called a Fan Tan roll or Yankee Buttermilk roll.
- Butterkaka – A bun similar to cinnamon rolls, but where several buns are compressed together and baked in a cake pan like sticky buns.

== C ==
- Cemita
- Cha siu bao – A Cantonese barbecue-pork-filled bun (baozi); filled with barbecue-flavored cha siu pork
- Challah roll – Jewish challah bread dough formed into a roll, often in a knotted or swirled form. It is found in most kosher sections of grocery stores, and therefore is commonly eaten by Jewish families across the United States.
- Chelsea bun – A currant bun that is first created in the 18th century at the Chelsea Bun House in Chelsea, London, an establishment favoured by Hanoverian royalty which was demolished in 1839
- Cinnamon bun – A sweet roll served commonly in Northern Europe and North America; its main ingredients are dough, cinnamon, sugar, and butter, which provide a robust and sweet flavor
- Cloverleaf roll – American version, consisting of three small balls of dough in a muffin cup, proofed and baked together.
- Cob – round roll, can be crusty or not; a term often used in the English Midlands
- Cocktail bun – A Hong Kong-style sweet bun with a filling of shredded coconut; one of several iconic types of baked goods originating from Hong Kong
- Colston bun – A bun named after Edward Colston; made in the city of Bristol, England; composed of a yeast dough flavored with dried fruit, candied peel and sweet spices
- Cream bun – A bun that varies all around the world; typically they are made with an enriched dough bread roll that is baked and cooled, then split and filled with cream
- Currant bun – A sweet bun that contains currants or raisins; towards the end of the seventeenth century the Reverend Samuel Wigley founded the Currant Bun Company in Southampton, Hampshire, UK
- Curry bread – Some Japanese curry is wrapped in a piece of dough, which is coated in flaky bread crumbs, and usually deep fried or baked.

== D ==
- Da bao – An extra-large version of the Chinese steamed bun. When translated, the name literally means 'big bun'.
- Dampfnudel – A white bread roll or sweet roll eaten as a meal or as a dessert in Germany and in France (Alsace); a typical dish in southern Germany
- Demi Baguette - A sandwich sized roll similar in shape and style to a French Baguette.
- Dinner roll – smaller roll, often crusty

== F ==
- Finger Bun – A hot dog sized fruit bun with flavoured icing originating in Australia.
- Finger roll – soft roll about three times longer than it is wide.
- French roll – generic term for the bread roll. Also a sweeter, softer roll with milk added to the dough.
- Fritter is a stuffed bread roll.
- Fruit bun – A sweet roll made with fruit, fruit peel, spices and sometimes nuts; a tradition in Britain and former British colonies including Jamaica, Australia, Singapore, and India

== H ==
- Ham and egg bun – A Hong Kong bun or bread that contains a sheet of egg and ham
- Hamburger bun – A round bun designed to encase a hamburger; invented in 1916 by a fry cook named Walter Anderson, who co-founded White Castle in 1921
- Hawaiian buns aka Portuguese sweet bread – A sweet bread roll which was brought to Hawaii by Portuguese immigrants and is now known as Hawaiian Bread.
- Heißwecke – A traditional type of currant bun that goes back, within the German-speaking region of Europe, at least to the Late Middle Ages
- Hoagie roll – used to prepare hoagie sandwiches
- Honey bun – A sweet roll of American origin, somewhat similar to the cinnamon bun, that is popular in the southeast United States
- Hoppang – A variant of jjinppang (Korean steamed bun)
- Hot cross bun – A sweet, spiced bun usually made with fruit but with other varieties such as apple-cinnamon or maple syrup and blueberries and marked with a cross on the top, traditionally eaten on Good Friday in the UK, Australia, New Zealand, South Africa, and Canada, but now popular all year round
- Hot dog bun – A long, soft bun shaped specifically to contain a hot dog or frankfurter
- Houska
- Huffkin – kentish roll with a dimple in the middle

== I ==
- Iced bun – A bread roll that is made to a sweet recipe with an icing sugar glaze covering the top
- Italian roll or hoagie roll, long roll or steak roll – long, narrow roll with an airy, dry interior and crusty exterior.

== J ==
- Jjinppang – A Korean steamed bun with red bean paste filling

== K ==
- Kaiser roll – crusty round roll, often topped with poppy seeds or sesame seeds, made by folding corners of a square inward so that their points meet.
- Krachel – Moroccan buns, see Qrashel
- Kummelweck – kaiser roll or bulkie roll that is topped with a mixture of kosher salt and caraway seeds. This type of roll is a regional variation found primarily in parts of Germany and in Upstate New York.

== L ==
- Llonguet – oblong bread roll with a groove in the top originating in the Catalan countries
- London bun – square shaped or rectangle bun made of rich yeast dough flavored with either currants or caraway seeds and topped with white sugar icing
- Longevity peach – A type of lotus seed bun that is white with a red dyed tip with a crease along the side, mimicking the shape of a peach.
- Lotus seed bun – A Chinese sweet bun found in China, prepared by steaming a yeast-leavened dough that contains lotus seed paste

== M ==
- Manchet – A yeast bread of very good quality, or a small flat circular loaf of the same; small enough to be held in the hand.
- Mandarin roll – A steamed bun originating from China; cooked by steaming; a food staple of Chinese cuisine which is similar to white bread in western cuisine
- Mantou – A steamed bread or bun originating in China; typically eaten as a staple in northern parts of China where wheat, rather than rice, is grown
- Melonpan – A sweet bun from Japan, also popular in Taiwan, China and Latin America; made from an enriched dough covered in a thin layer of crisp cookie dough
- Michetta - a highly leavened Italian white bread, recognizable by its bulged shape.
- Momo – A type of South Asian dumpling, popular across the Indian subcontinent and the Himalayan regions of broader South Asia.
- Morning roll

== N ==
- Nigerian buns
- Nikuman – A bun made from flour dough, and filled with cooked ground pork or other ingredients; a kind of chūka man (中華まん; lit. Chinese-style steamed bun) also known in English as pork buns
- Nudger – long soft white or brown roll similar to a large finger roll common in Liverpool.

== O ==
- Onion roll – roll flavoured or topped with onions, sometimes with poppy seeds.
- Oven bottom – flat, floury, soft roll; a term often used in Lancashire

== P ==
- Pampushka – a small savory or sweet yeast-raised bun or doughnut typical for Ukrainian cuisine
- Pan de coco – Filipino sweet roll with sweetened shredded coconut fillings (bukayo)
- Pan de monja – a dense bread roll from the Philippines with a characteristic indentation down the middle.
- Pan de muerto – Spanish for "Bread of the Dead"; also called pan de los muertos; a sweet roll traditionally baked in Mexico during the weeks leading up to the Día de Muertos, celebrated on November 1 and 2; a sweetened soft bread shaped like a bun, often decorated with bone-like pieces
- Pan de siosa – Filipino soft pull-apart bread
- Concha – Mexican pastry that is famous for its shell-like shape
- Pandesal – a Filipino staple bread roll
- Pão de queijo – A Brazilian cheese bread, small, baked cheese roll, a popular snack and breakfast food in Brazil.
- Pão francês – popular Brazilian bread roll
- Parker House roll – roll made by flattening the center of a ball of dough with a rolling pin so that it becomes an oval shape and then folding the oval in half. They are made with milk and are generally quite buttery, soft, and slightly sweet with a crispy shell.
- Pastel de Camiguín – Filipino soft bread with a custard filling
- Pav – soft Indian bread roll/dinner roll
- Peanut butter bun – A Hong Kong sweet bun also found in Chinatown bakery shops; it has layers of peanut butter filling, sometimes with light sprinkles of sugar mixed in for extra flavor
- Pebete – An Argentine soft oval bun made of wheat flour with a thin brown crust, rather like a fatter hot dog roll
- Penny bun – A small bread bun or loaf which cost one old penny at the time when there were 240 pence to the pound; it was a common size loaf of bread in England regulated by the Assize of Bread Act of 1266; the size of the loaf could vary depending on the prevailing cost of the flour used in the baking; a version of the nursery rhyme London Bridge Is Falling Down includes the line "build it up with penny loaves"
- Pets de sœurs – A French Canadian sweet bun, similar in construction to a cinnamon bun.
- Piggy bun – A Hong Kong pastry that is essentially the equivalent of the French baguette; found in Hong Kong bakeries and Cha chaan teng; in Hong Kong, it is often cut in half and served with butter and condensed milk
- Pinagong
- Pineapple bun – A sweet bun predominantly popular in Hong Kong and Macau, though they are not uncommon in Chinatowns worldwide; although it is known as "pineapple bun", the traditional version contains no pineapple
- Pistolet
- Pork chop bun – famous and popular snack in Macau, the "piggy bun" is crisp outside and soft inside; a freshly fried pork chop is filled into it
- Portuguese sweet bread – enriched sweet bread or yeasted cake originally reserved for festive occasions, but now enjoyed at all times.
- Putok – also called "star bread"

== Q ==
- Qrashel – Moroccan buns or bread rolls made of sesame and anise seeds.

== R ==
- Röggelchen – A small double bread roll made with rye flour.
- Rožok – Also known as "Rohlík" (Czech) or "Hörncher" (German) is an oblong bread roll made out of a rolled up triangle of dough.
- Rum roll – historic Washington, D.C. specialty, similar to a cinnamon bun with rum flavored icing

== S ==
- Saffron bun – A rich, spiced, yeast-leavened sweet bun, flavored with saffron and cinnamon or nutmeg, and contains currants, similar to a teacake
- Sally Lunn bun – Brioche-like soft sweet yeast bread associated with the city of Bath in the West Country of England
- Sausage bun – Hong Kong pastry, essentially the equivalent of pigs in a blanket; found in Hong Kong as well as in many bakeries in Chinatowns in western countries
- Scotch Morning Roll - Batch-baked bread roll, soft inside, crusty and chewy on top.
- Scuffler – roughly triangular bread roll traditionally baked in Yorkshire.
- Semla – A traditional sweet roll made in various forms in Denmark, the Faroe Islands, Iceland, Estonia, Finland, Latvia, Lithuania, Sweden and Norway; associated with Lent and especially Shrove Monday and Shrove Tuesday; the oldest version of the semla was a plain bread bun, eaten in a bowl of warm milk; in Swedish this is known as hetvägg
- Shengjian mantou – A type of small, pan-fried baozi which is a specialty of Shanghai and usually filled with pork and gelatin that melts into soup/liquid when cooked.
- Siopao – Hokkien term for bāozi (包 子), literally meaning "steamed buns"; it has been incorporated into Filipino cuisine as well as Thai cuisine where it is called salapao (Thai: ซาลาเปา)
- Speķrauši
- Spiced bun – A sweet bun to which spices are added; common examples are the hot cross bun and the Jamaican spiced bun
- Spuccadella
- Sticky bun – A dessert or breakfast sweet roll that generally consists of rolled pieces of leavened dough, sometimes containing brown sugar or cinnamon, which are then compressed together to form a flat loaf corresponding to the size of the baking pan; they have been consumed since the Middle Ages, at which time cinnamon became more prominent
- Stottie cake – thick, flat, round loaf. Stotties are common in North East England.
- Sufganiyah – A deep-fried bun, filled with jam or custard, and then topped with powdered sugar. Typically eaten in Israel during Hanukkah.
- Sweet roll, also called a breakfast roll (chiefly US) – can refer to a variety of sweet, yeast-leavened breakfast breads or dessert foods.

== T ==
- Tahini roll
- Teacake – A fruited sweet bun usually served toasted and buttered.
- Tingmo – A steamed bread in Tibetan cuisine.[1] It is sometimes described as a steamed bun[2] that is similar to Chinese flower rolls. It does not contain any kind of filling.
- Tuna bun – A Hong Kong-style fish bun that contains tuna paste; commonly found in Hong Kong

== W ==
- Wang Mandu – A savory steamed bun filled with vegetables and meat. Literally means,"king dumpling" or "big dumpling".

== X ==
- Xiaolongbao – A steamed bun from the Jiangnan region of China; fillings vary by region and usually include some meat or a gelatin-gelled aspic that becomes a soup when steamed

== Z ==
- Zeeuwse bolus – A spiral shaped bun covered in dark brown sugar, lemon zest and cinnamon.
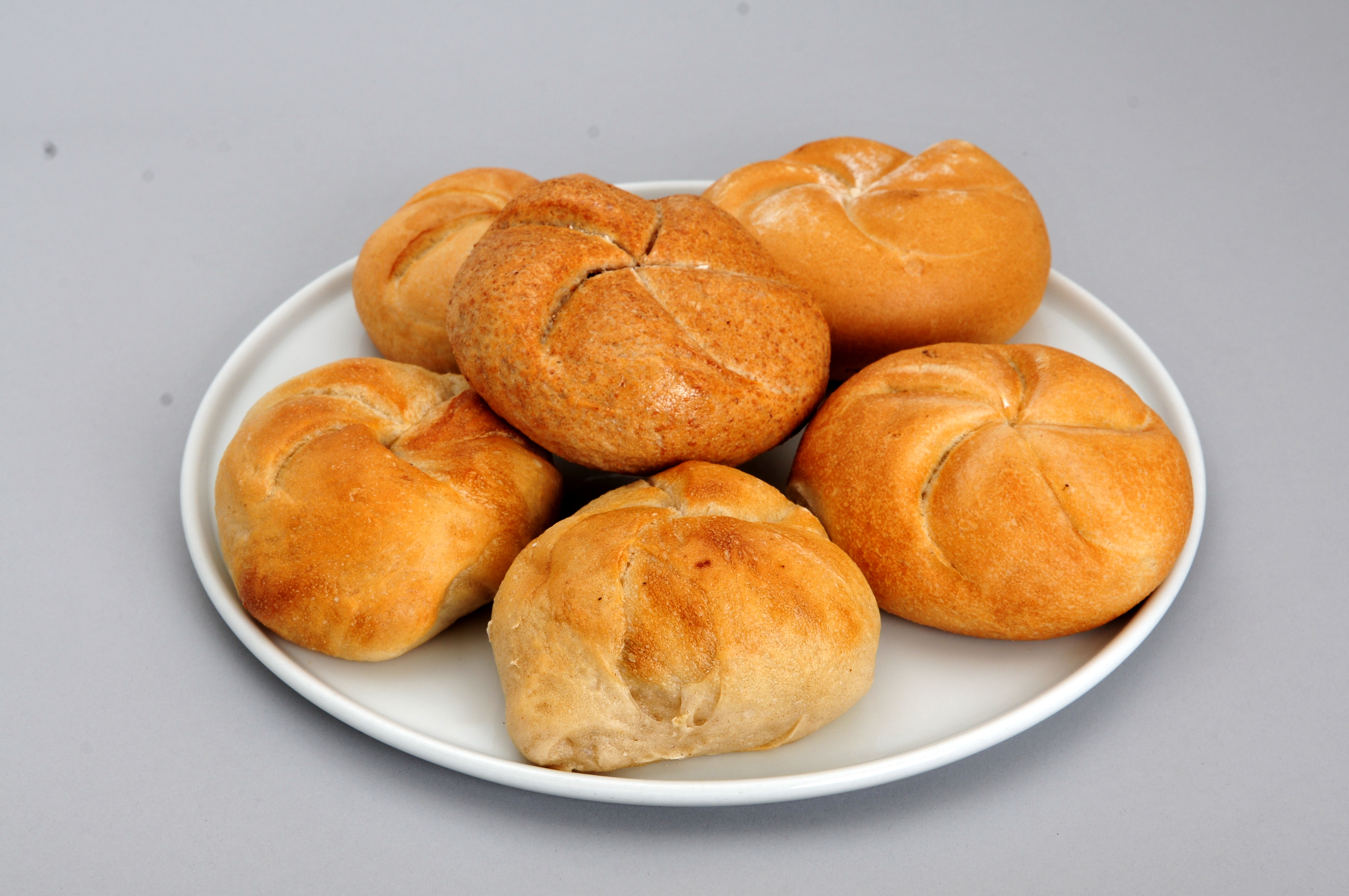
Kaiser rolls

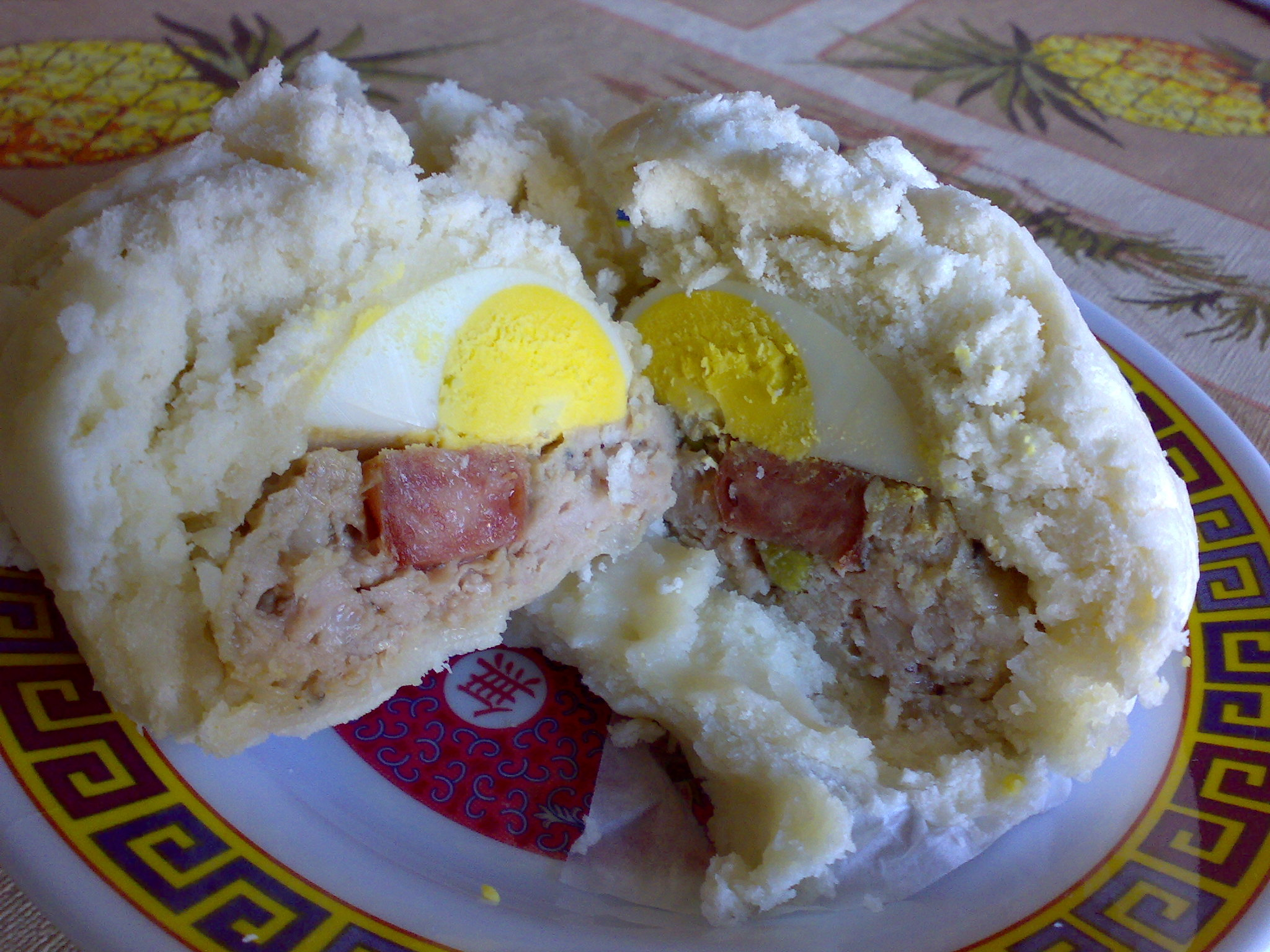
A bánh bao split in half, displaying its contents

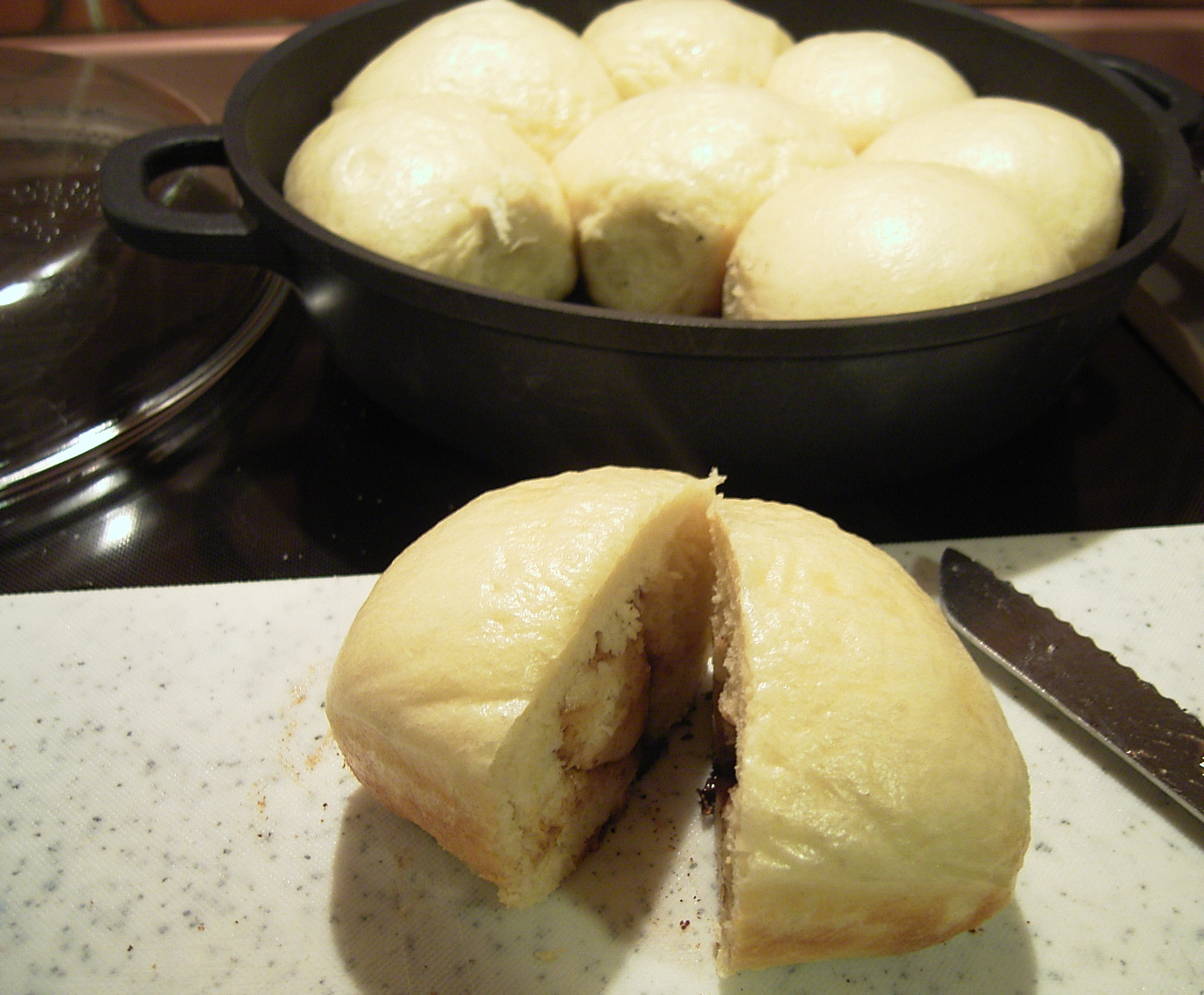
Dampfnudel

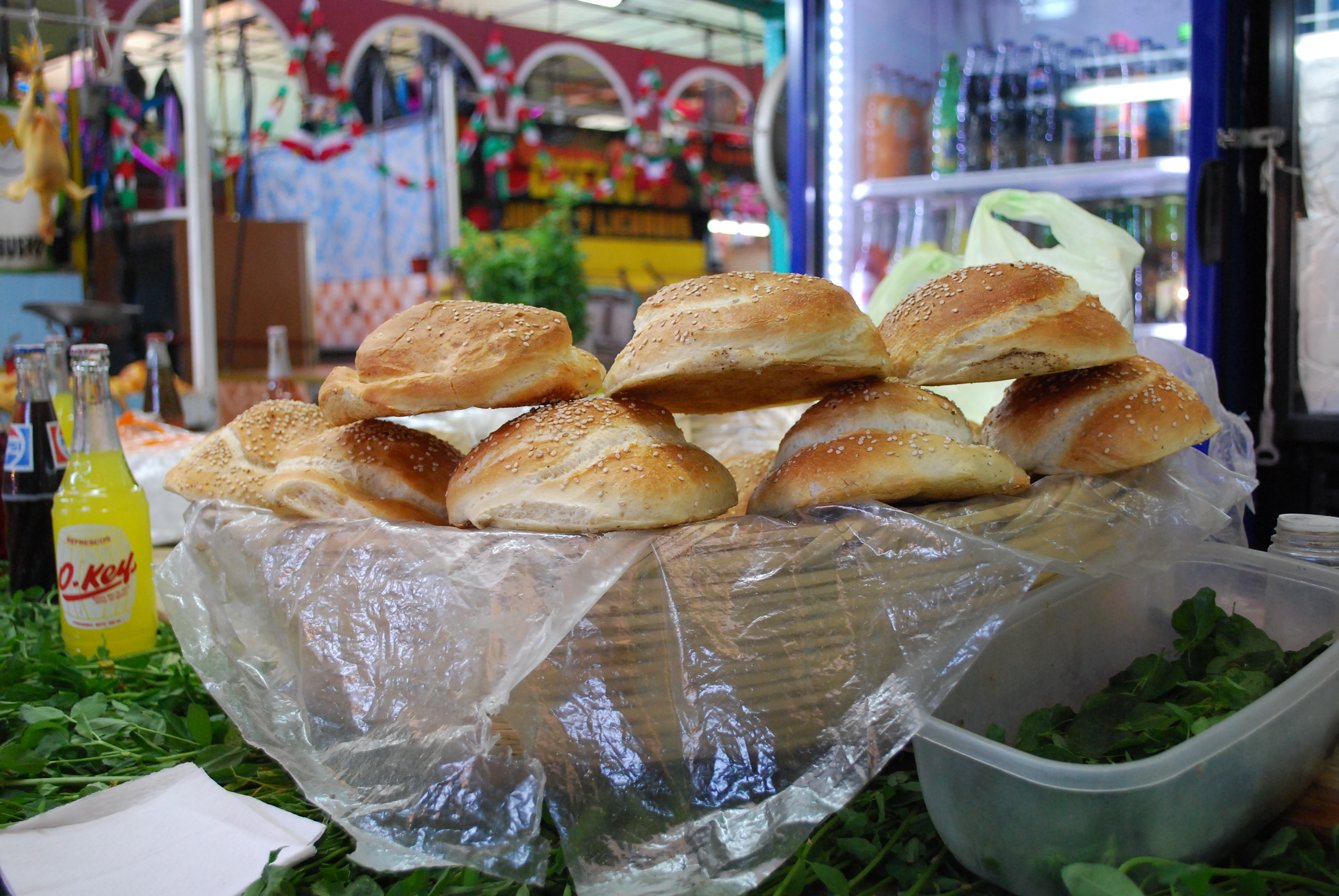
Cemita rolls at a market in Puebla, Mexico

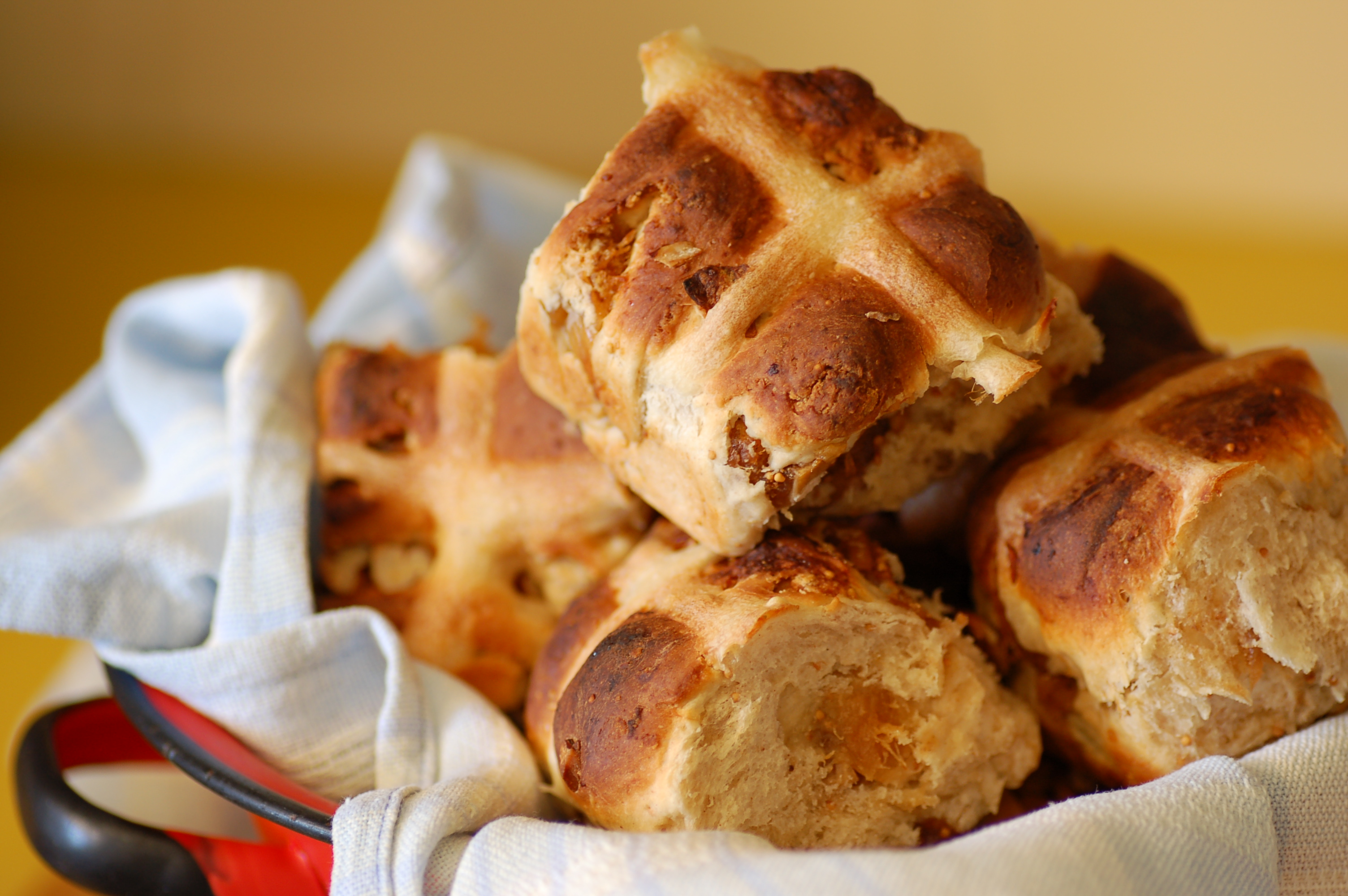
Hot cross buns

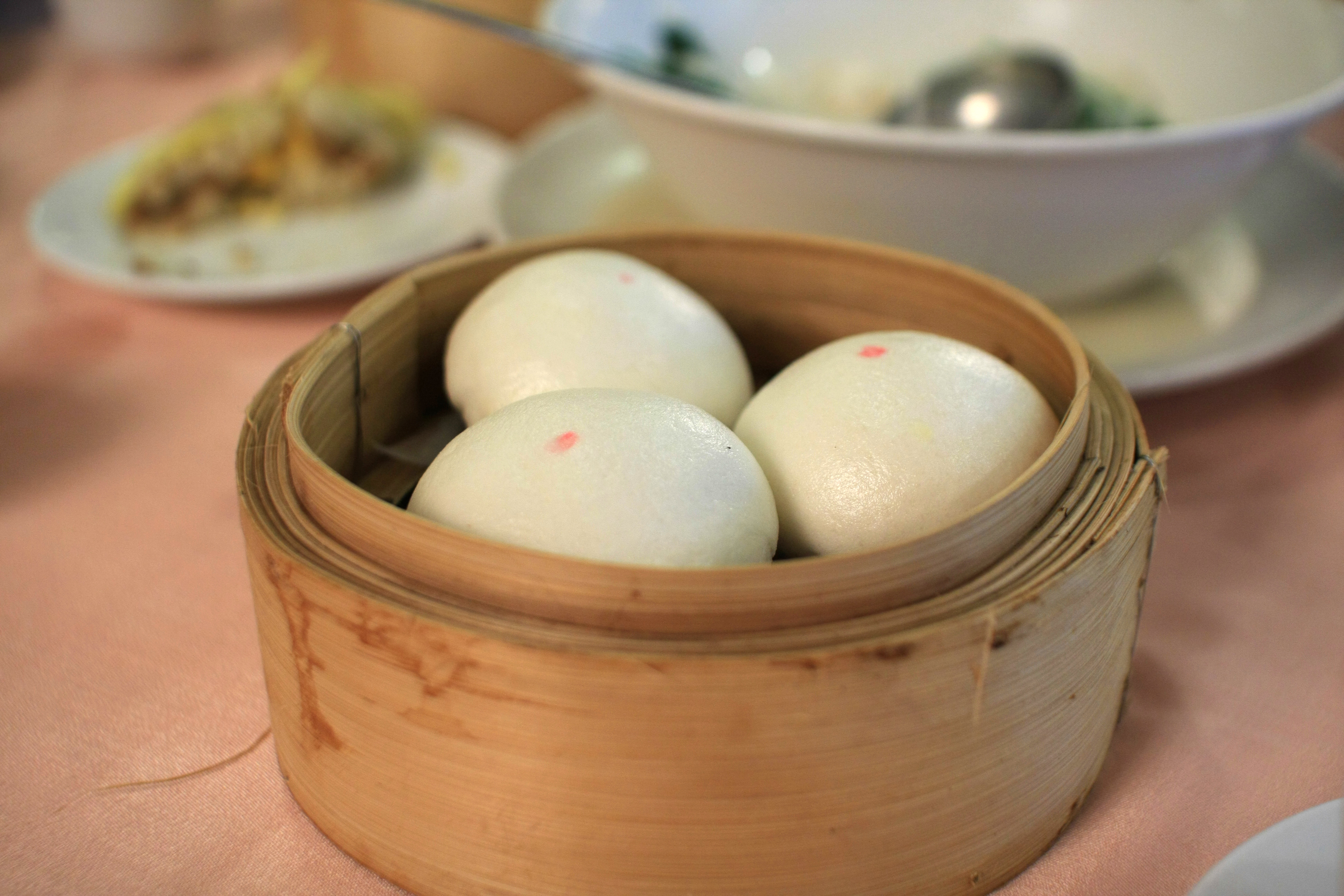
Lotus seed buns – This particular variety is available in many typical Cantonese restaurants as a type of dim sum.

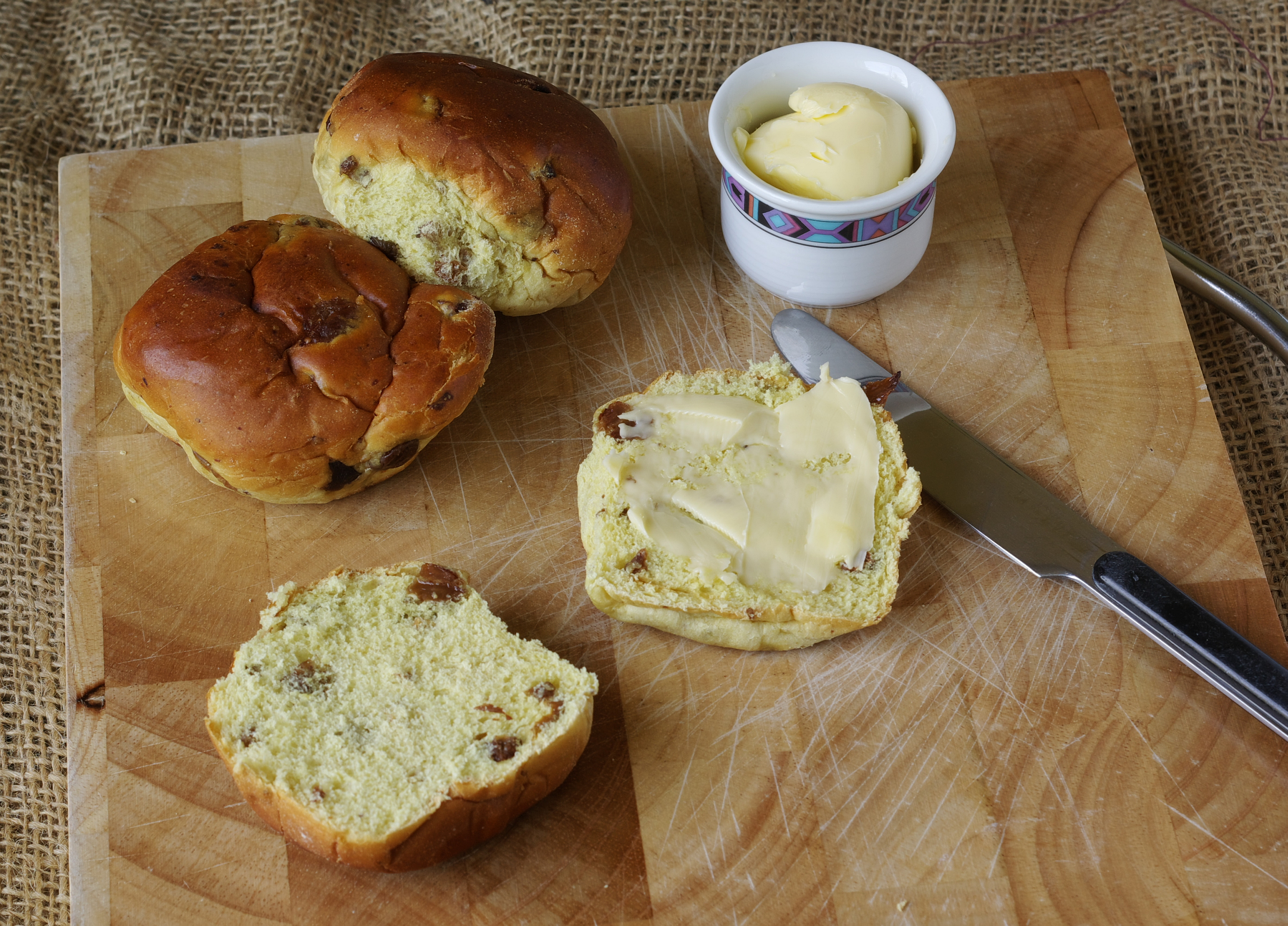
Small currant buns

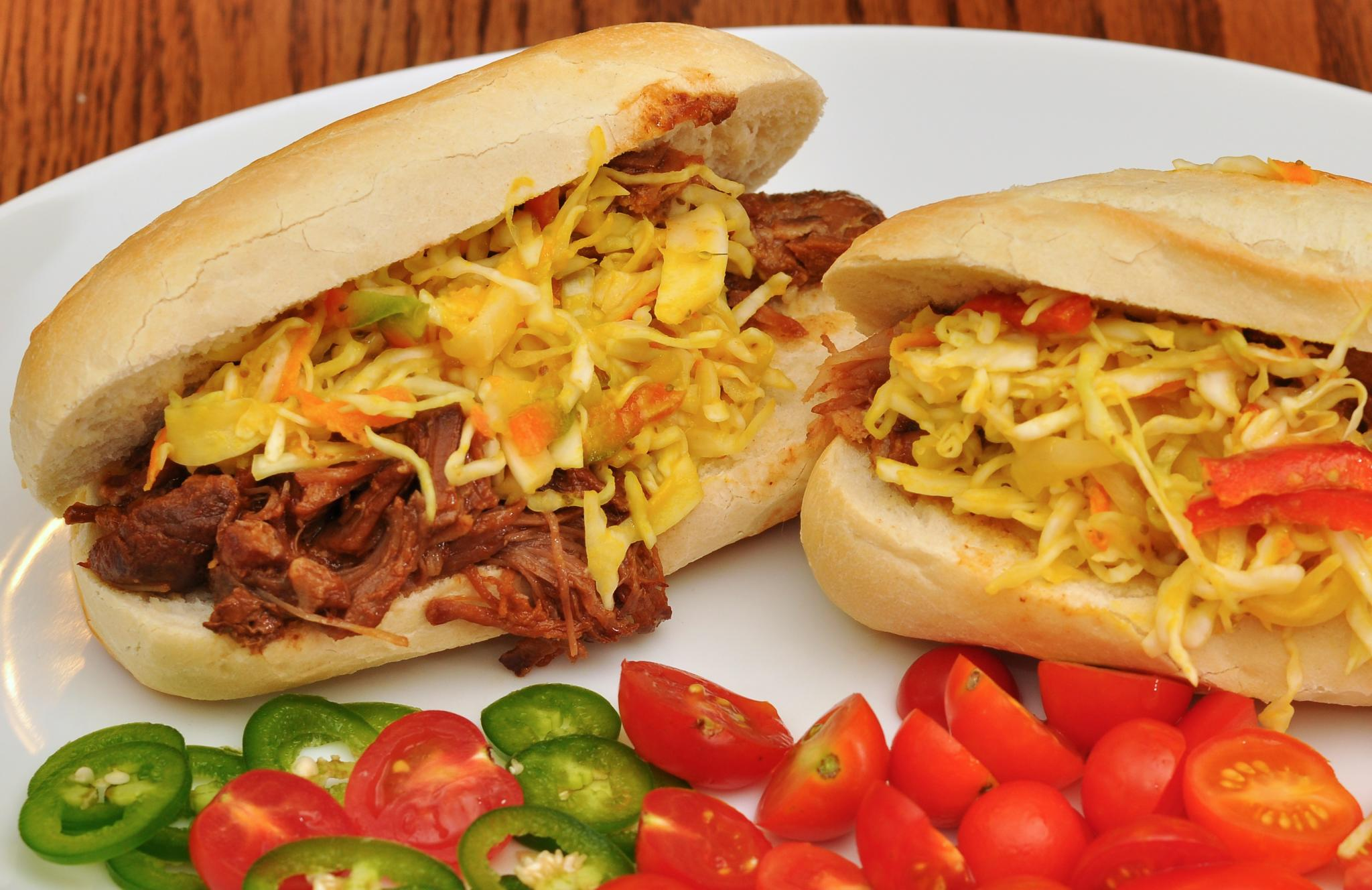
Barbecue pork sandwiches in hoagie rolls

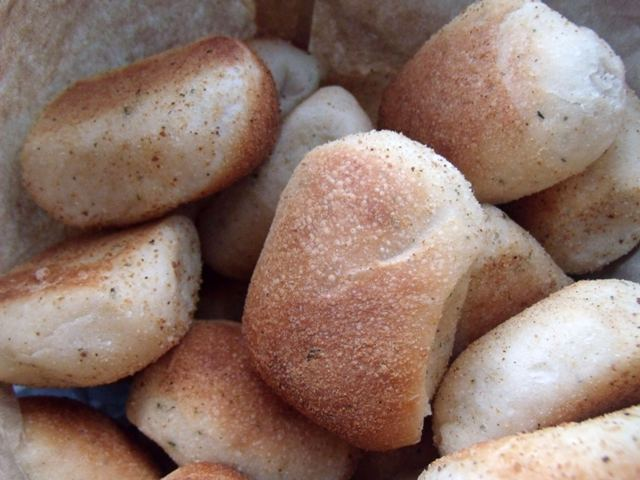
Pandesal from the Philippines with shredded malunggay leaves

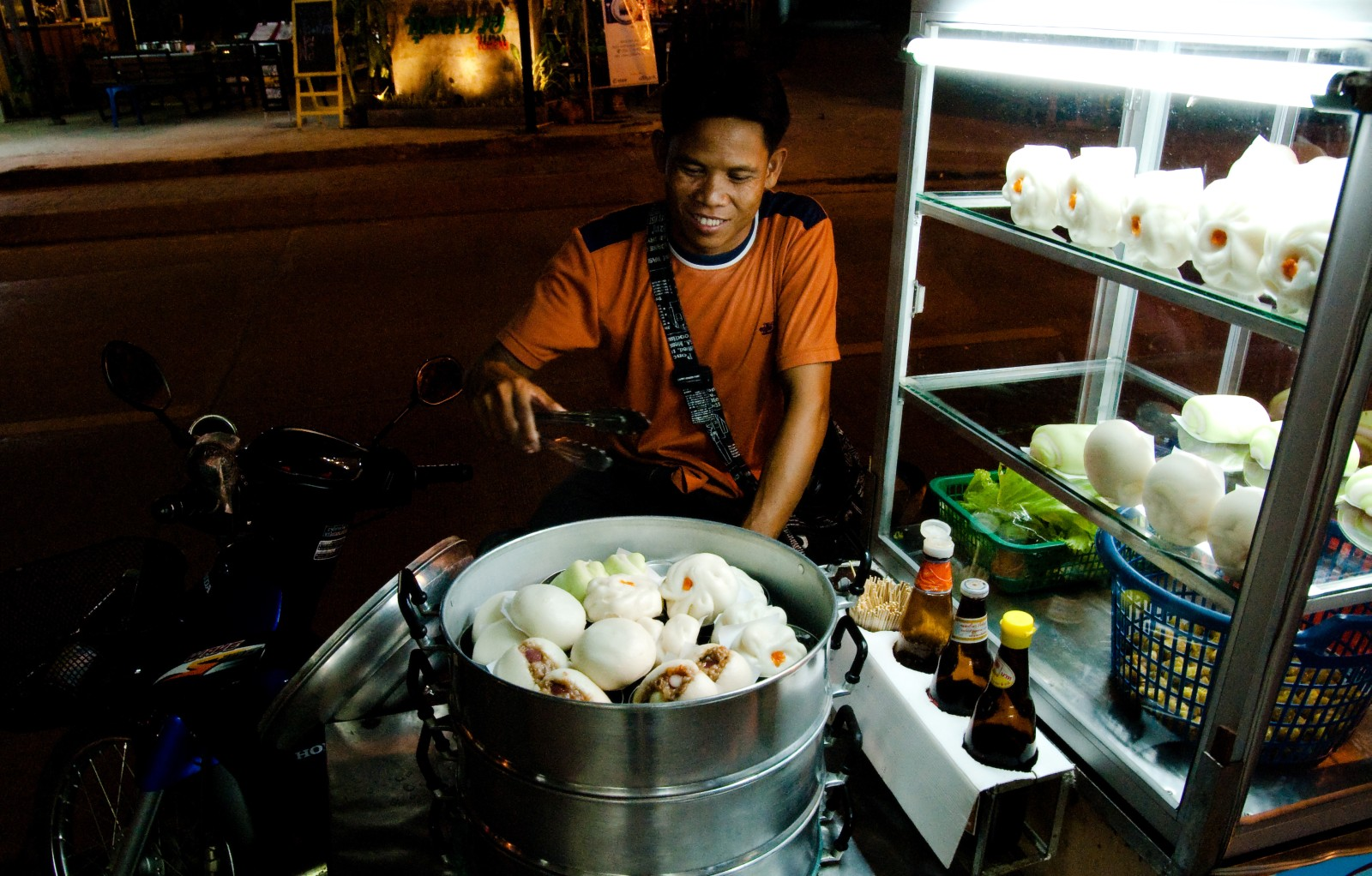
A street vendor in Chiang Mai, Thailand, selling various types of salapao

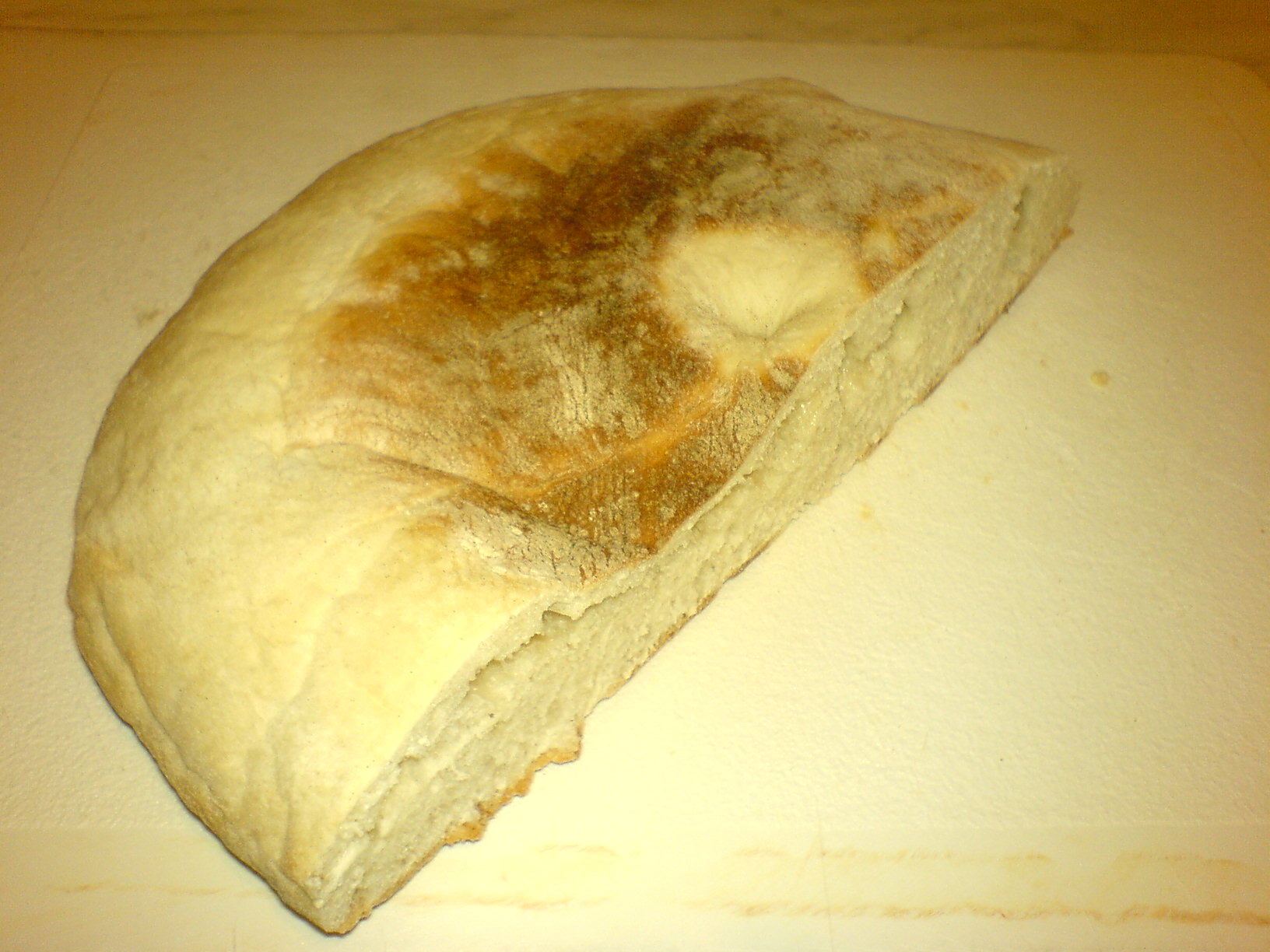
A stottie cake

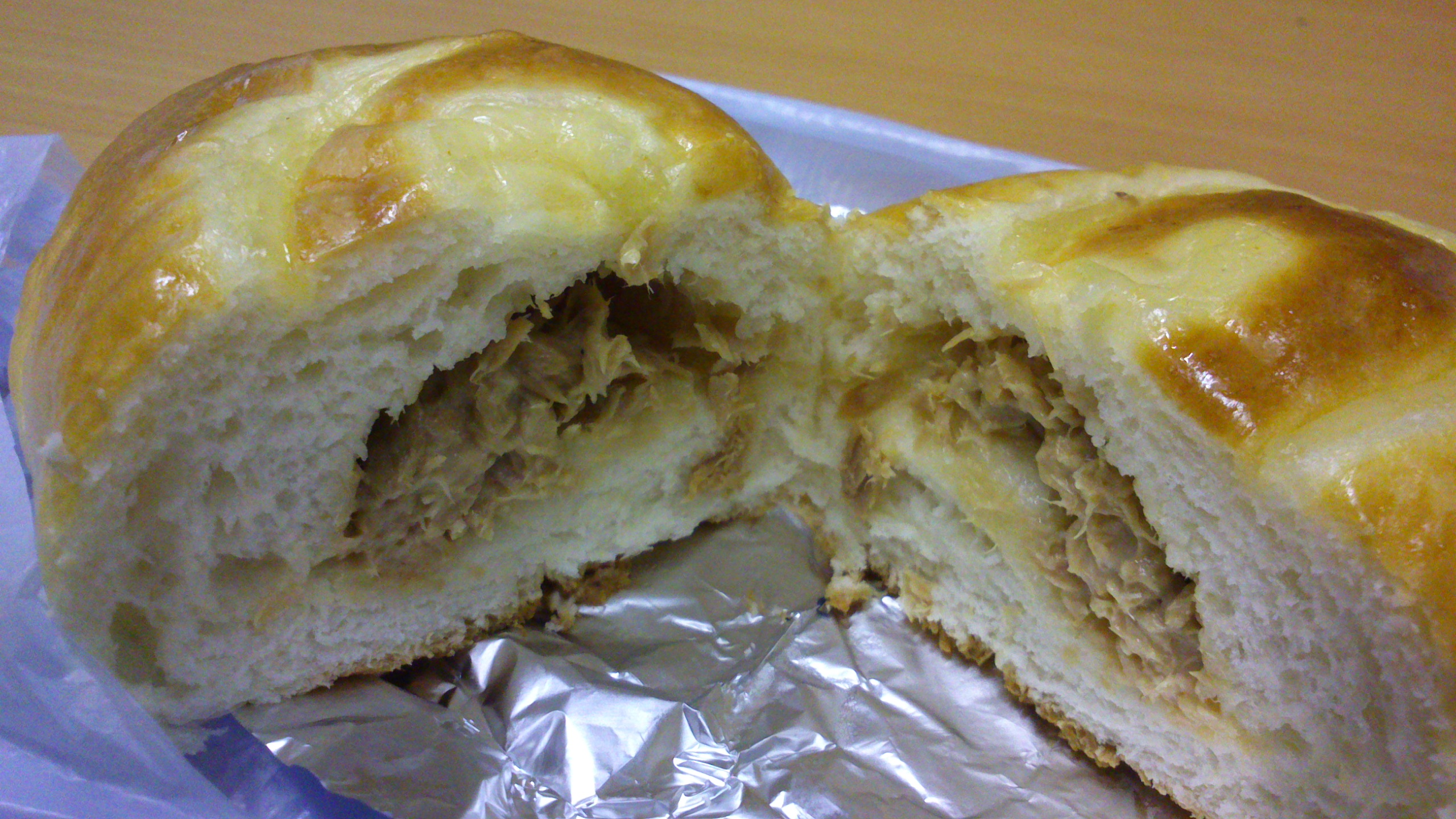
A tuna bun filled with canned tuna

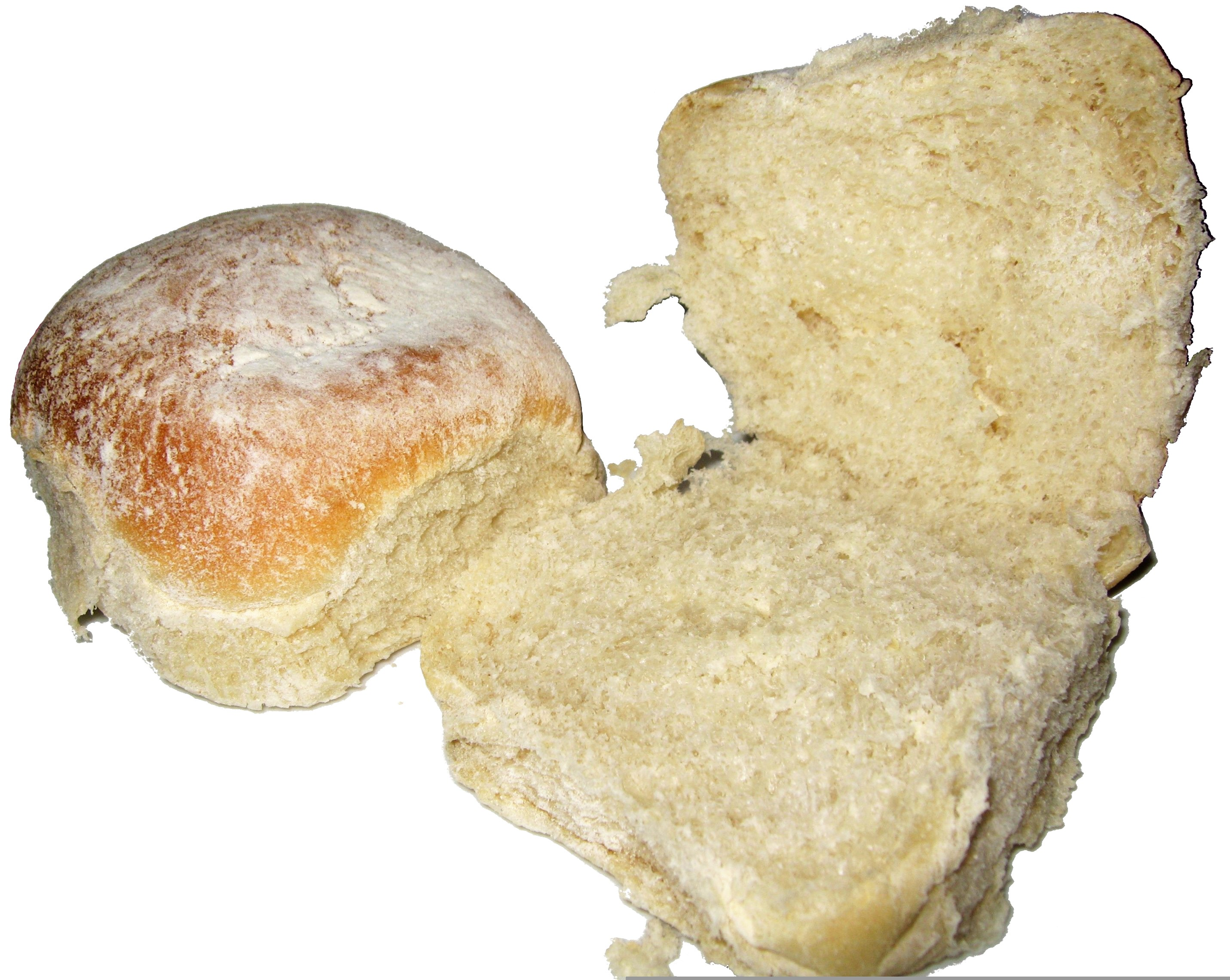
Blaa

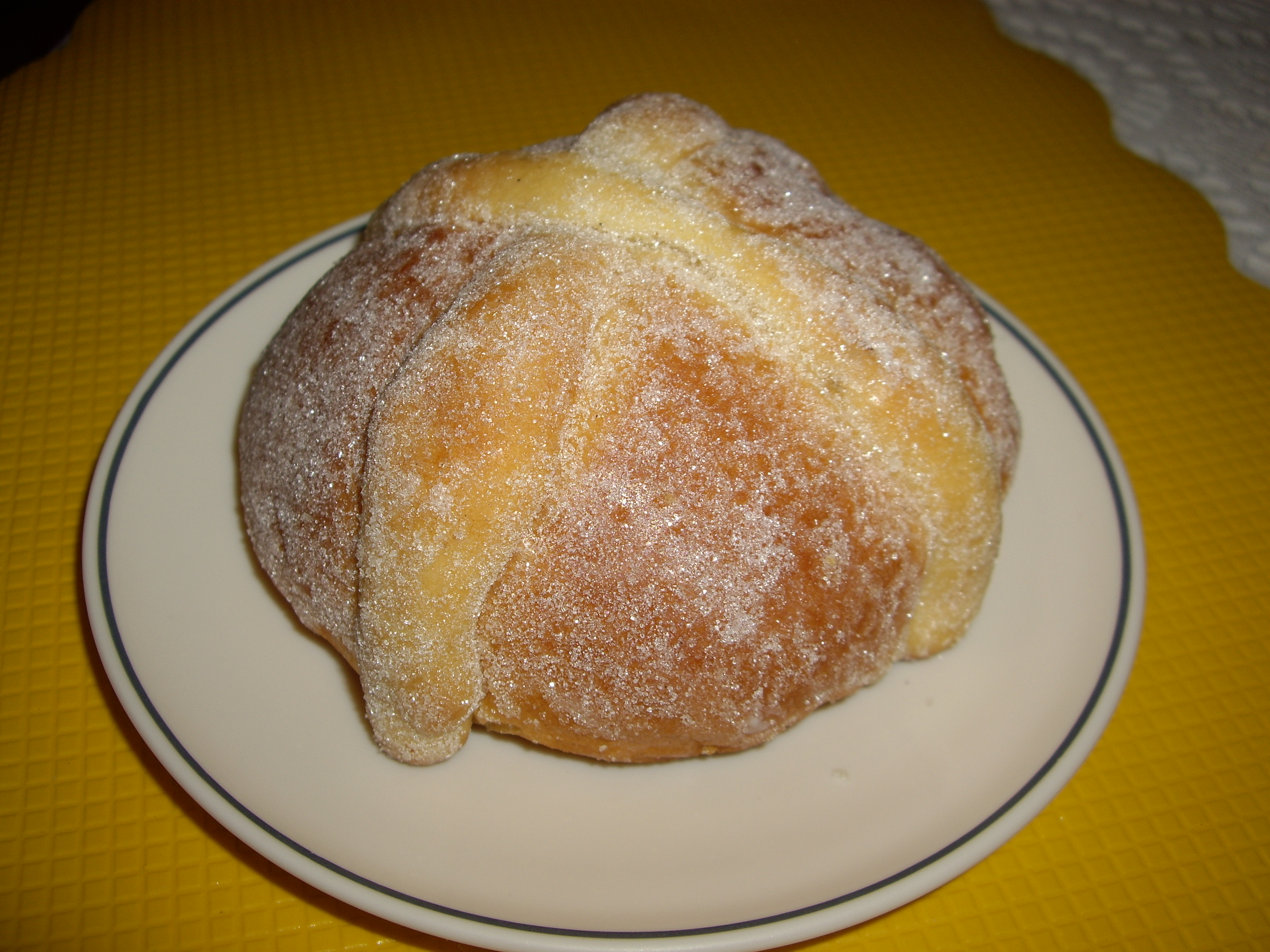
A piece of sugary pan de muerto

== See also ==
- Breakfast roll
- Croissant (crescent roll)
- List of baked goods
- List of breads
- List of bread dishes
- Ovelgönne bread roll
- Sweet roll
