= London bun =

English sweet bun

- Type: Sweet bread
- Main ingredients: Yeast dough, currants, icing

A London bun is a square-shaped bun made of rich yeast dough flavored with currants and candied peel topped with white sugar icing or crystallised sugar.

Formerly a popular teatime bun, its nearest still-popular equivalent is the Bath bun. Neither should be confused with the finger bun, an elongated bun topped with white icing sugar, optionally with shredded or finely chopped coconut, and available with or without fruit (currants/sultanas).

The phrase "all talk and no London bun," believed to have originated in South Australia, is used to describe a person who fails to follow through on their promises.

== See also ==
- Iced bun
- List of buns
