= Pork chop bun =

Macau snack

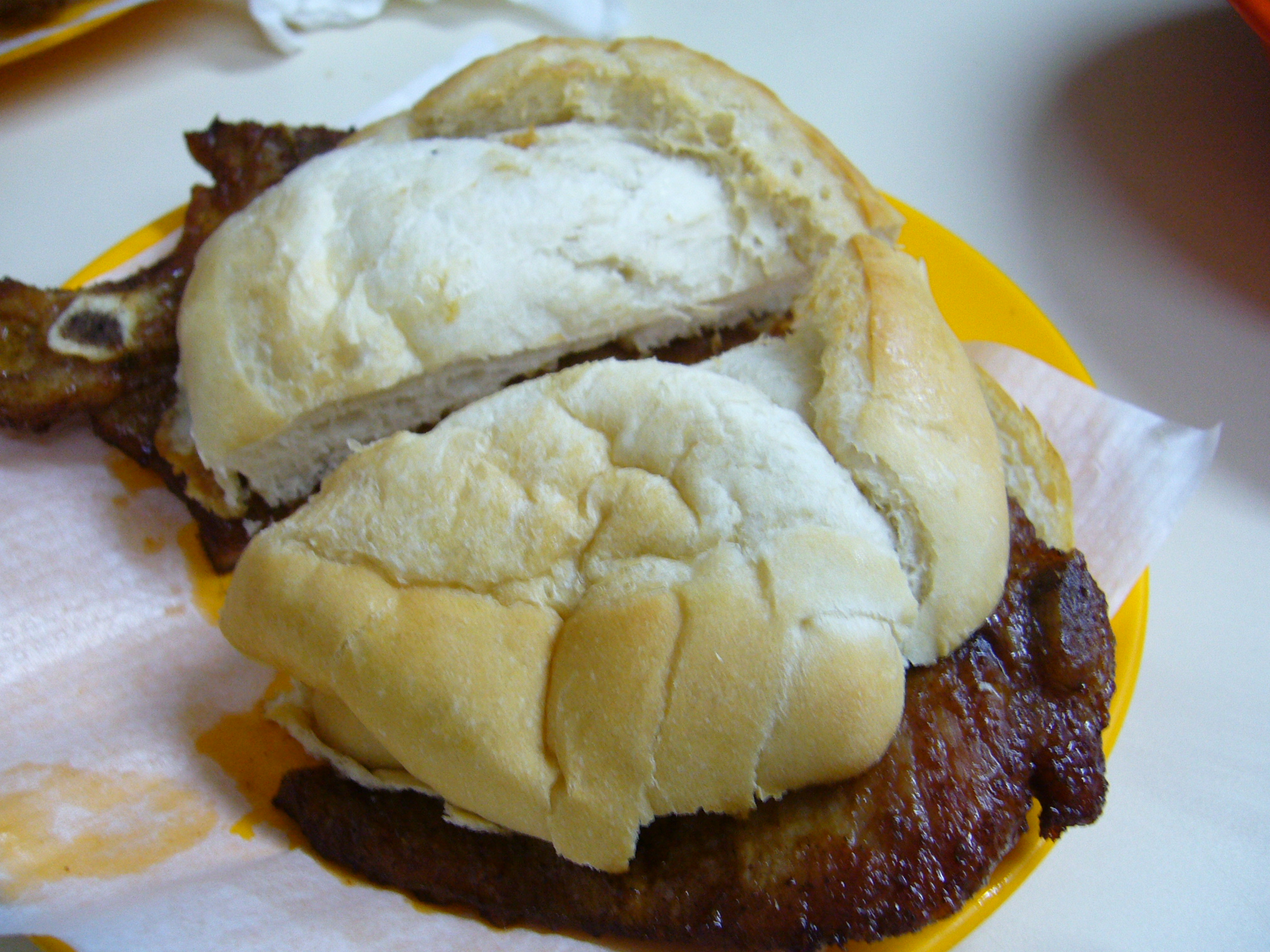
- Type: Sandwich
- Place of origin: Macau
- Main ingredients: Piggy bun, pork chop

Pork chop bun
- Chinese: 豬扒包
Transcriptions
Standard Mandarin
- Hanyu Pinyin: zhūbā bāo
Yue: Cantonese
- Jyutping: zyu1 paa2 baau1

A pork chop bun is a well-known snack in Macau, and has been described as a Macau specialty. The dish was developed in Macau during the mid-20th century, reflecting the region’s history as a meeting point between Chinese and Portuguese culinary traditions. The dish is widely believed to have been inspired by the Portuguese bifana, a pork sandwich introduced during the colonial period, and later adapted using local ingredients and preparation methods. One of the most famous vendors associated with popularizing the snack is Tai Lei Loi Kei, a Macau eatery established in 1968 that is often credited with helping establish the pork chop bun as a regional specialty.

Over time, the pork chop bun became one of Macau’s most recognizable street foods and a symbol of the territory’s fusion cuisine, which combines Cantonese culinary traditions with European influences resulting from centuries of Portuguese presence.

The bun (locally called a "piggy bun") is extremely crisp outside and very soft inside. A fried pork chop is placed in the bun horizontally. The pork chop bun has been described as "the Macanese version of a hamburger."

== See also ==
- Beef bun
- Char siu baau
- List of sandwiches
- List of buns
- List of pork dishes
- List of stuffed dishes
