= Beef bun =

Bun with beef filling

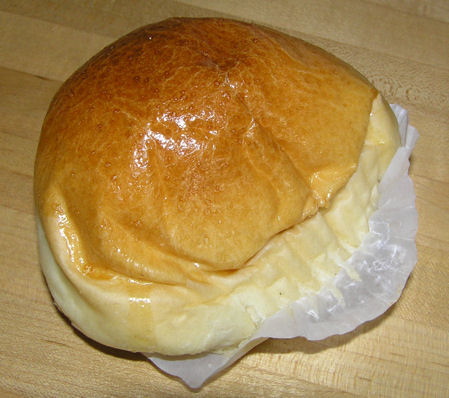
- Type: Hong Kong pastry
- Place of origin: Hong Kong

Beef bun
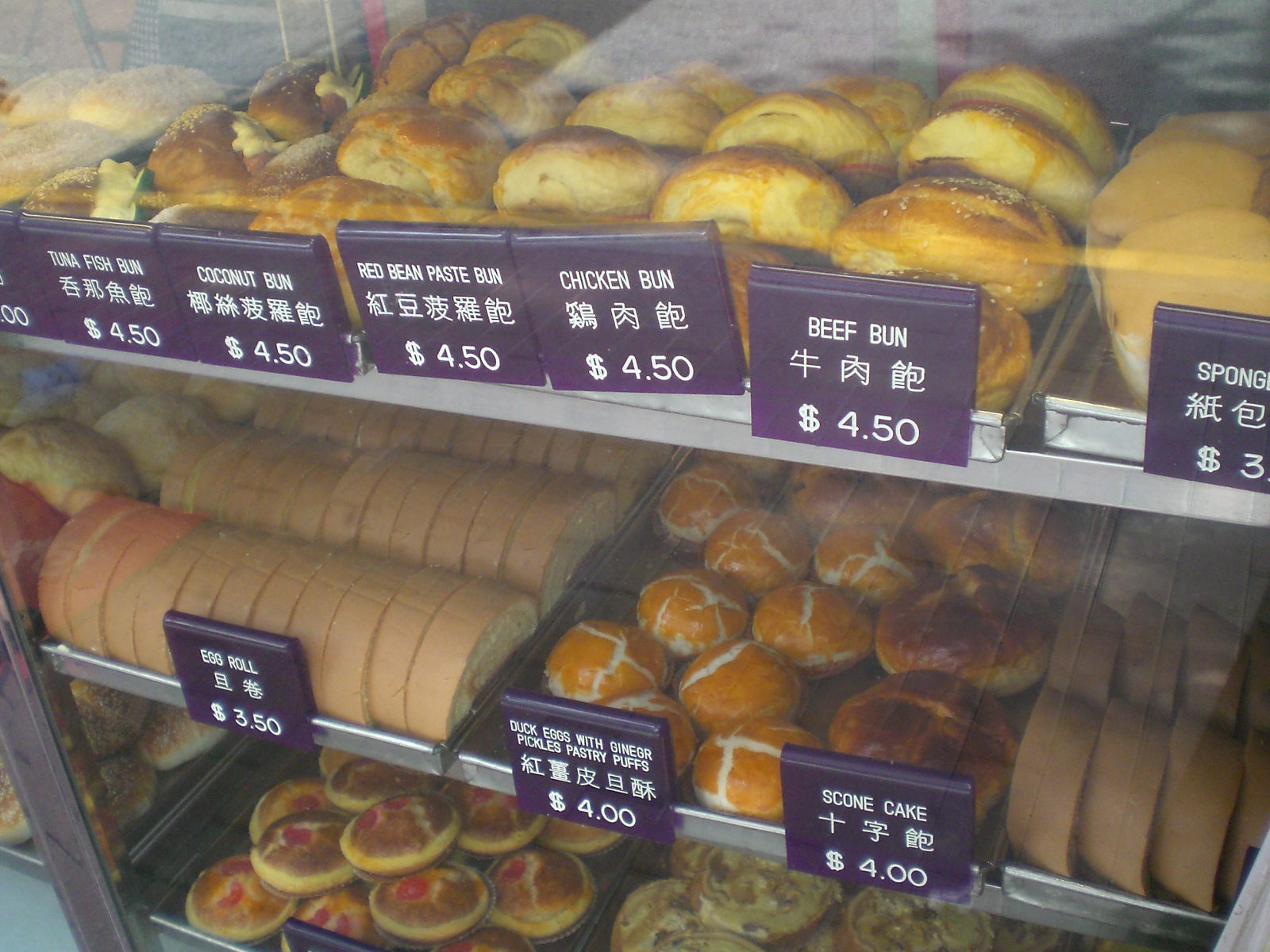
- Chinese: 牛肉包
- Literal meaning: beef bun
- Jyutping: ngau4juk6 baau1

Beef bun is a type of Hong Kong bun with a ground beef filling, sometimes including pieces of onion. It is a standard savoury bun in Hong Kong and can also be found in most Chinatown bakery shops.

== See also ==
- Ham and egg bun
- Tuna bun
- List of buns
- List of stuffed dishes
