= Penny bun =

Small bread loaf historically costing one pence

- Alternative names: Penny loaf
- Type: Bread
- Place of origin: England

A penny bun or a penny loaf was a small bread bun or loaf which cost one old penny at the time when there were 240 pence to the pound. A penny loaf was a common size loaf of bread in England regulated by the Assize of Bread and Ale act of 1266. The size of the loaf could vary depending on the prevailing cost of the flour used in the baking. The nursery rhyme London Bridge Is Falling Down has a version which includes the line "Build it up with penny loaves".

The term appears in the first complete published version of the "To Market, To Market" rhyme in 1805 as "To market, to market, to buy a penny bun, Home again, home again, market is done" in Songs for the Nursery.

"Penny bun" is also the common English name for the cep (French), or Boletus edulis, an edible basidiomycete mushroom. Native to Europe and North America, it is Europe's second most sought-after fungus after truffles.

The expression "penny bun" is Cockney rhyming slang for one, sun and son. "Cockle to a penny bun" means racing odds of 10 to 1.

== See also ==
- Hot cross bun
- List of buns
