= Iced bun =

Bread bun with a white or pink icing sugar glaze

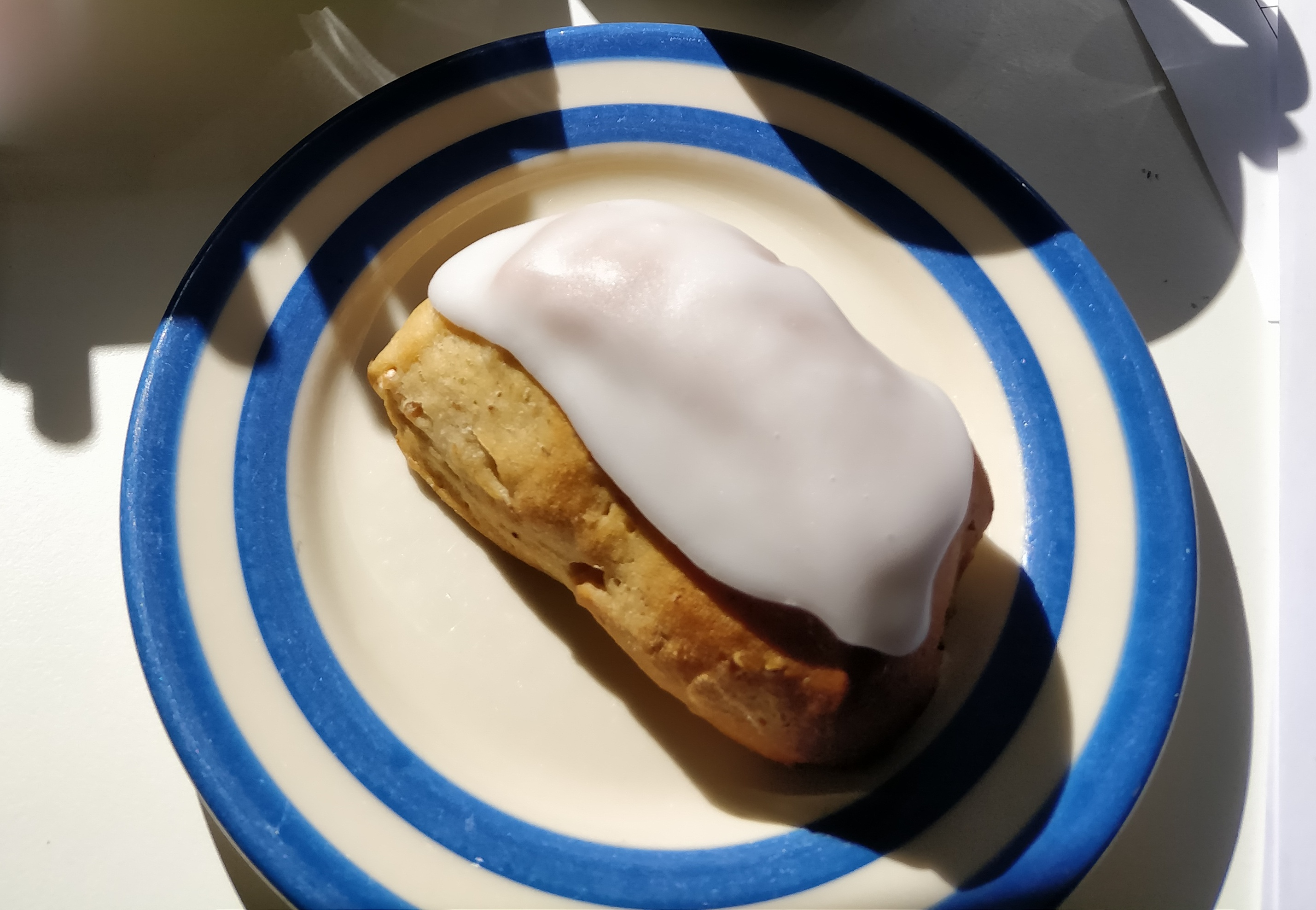
- A homemade iced bun
- Type: Bread roll
- Place of origin: Britain
- Region or state: Nationwide
- Main ingredients: powdered sugar

An iced bun (also known as Swiss bun or iced finger) is a bread bun normally with a white or pink icing sugar glaze covering the top. The dough may be enriched (made with eggs, milk, and butter) or simply an oblong bread roll. In some bakeries or recipes, iced buns are garnished with additional sweets or are decorated as ballet slippers or other shapes.

Iced buns can be filled. A "raspberry bun" contains a small amount of raspberry (or sometimes strawberry) jam filling, which oozes out when the bun is bitten; they have many variations in size and shape, and are sometimes coated in sprinkles or coconut. An iced bun may be split after baking, then filled with flavoured whipped cream. There is also a variety with lemon curd in the centre and lemon icing on top.

Iced buns are popular bakery items in the United Kingdom. The method of eating iced buns varies: some people eat them as-is, while others prefer to split and butter the bun before eating.

== See also ==
- List of British breads
- List of buns
