= Finger bun =

Fruit bun from Australia

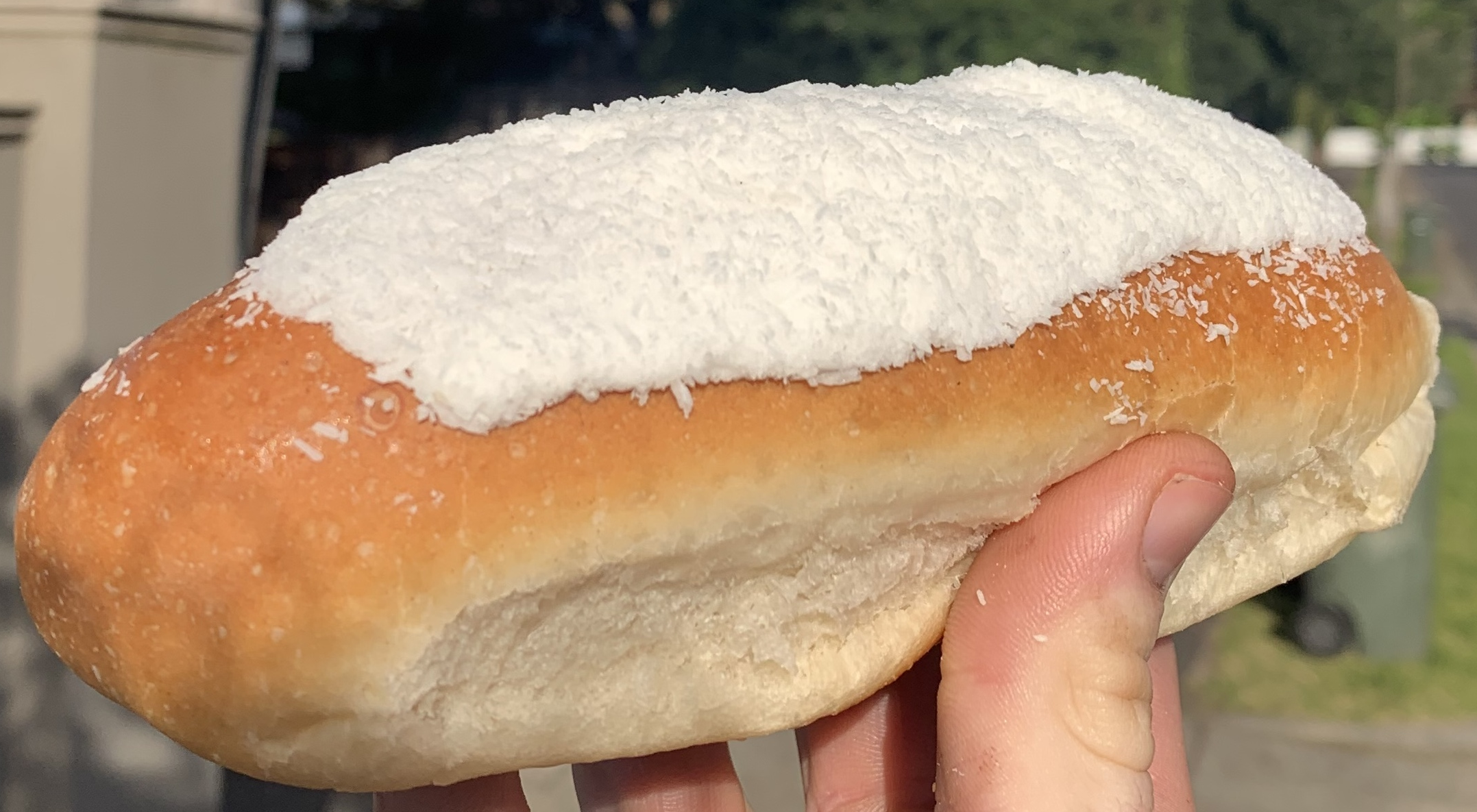
- Alternative names: Iced finger
- Type: Spiced bun
- Place of origin: Australia, New Zealand, United Kingdom
- Main ingredients: Wheat flour, leavening agent, water or milk, sugar, dried fruit, spices, coconut icing

The finger bun is a fruit bun popular in the United Kingdom; Australia, particularly in South Australia and Victoria; and New Zealand. At one time it was a bakery and school staple but its popularity has waned. It has been used to help promote awareness of breast cancer.

They are also popular in the United Kingdom where, unlike in Australia, they are eaten unbuttered.

== See also ==
- List of buns
