= Blaa =

Irish bread roll

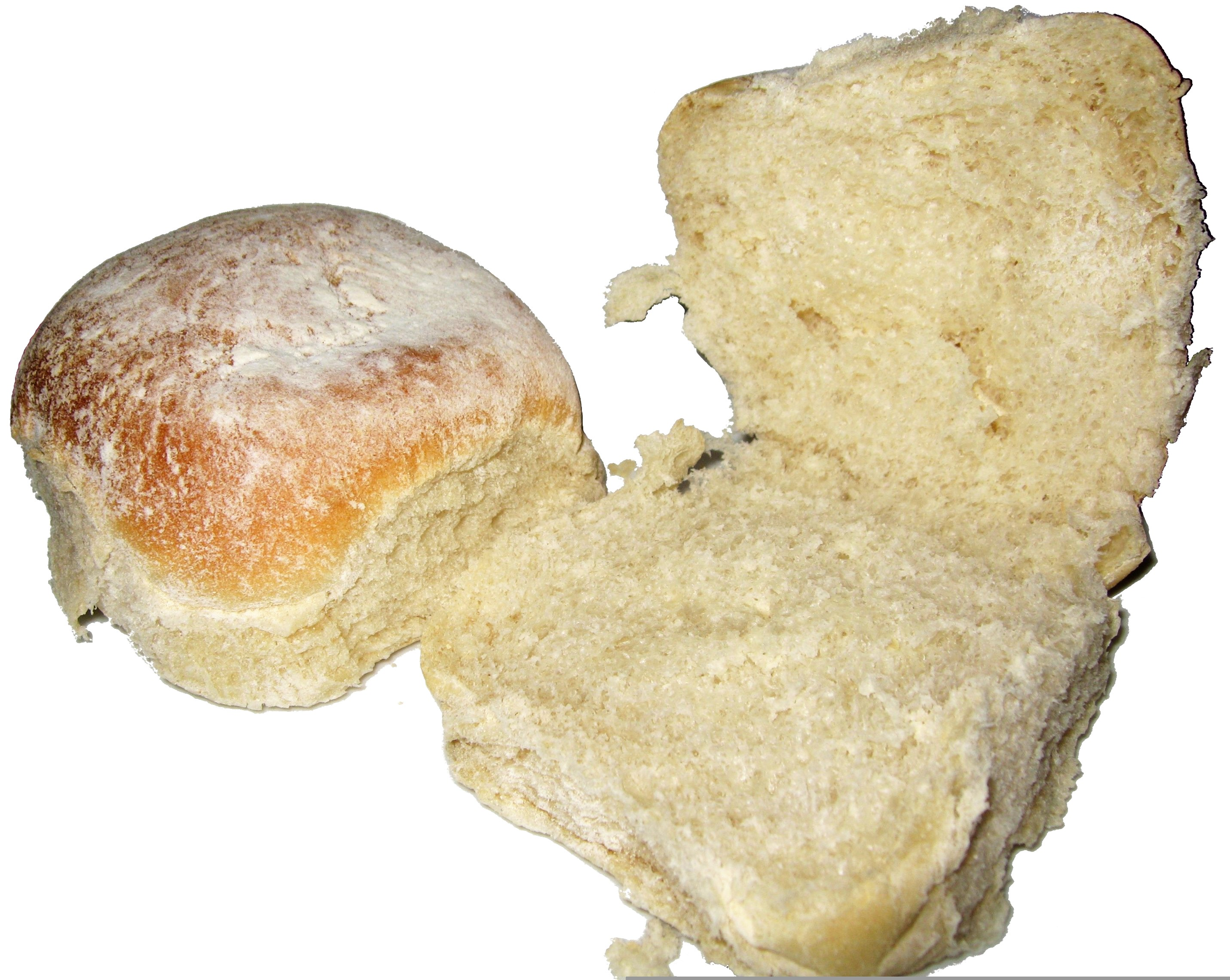
- Alternative names: bla, blah
- Course: Usually breakfast or lunch
- Place of origin: Ireland
- Region or state: Waterford
- Main ingredients: white flour
- Ingredients generally used: yeast, sugar, water, salt

A blaa /blɑː/, or Waterford Blaa, is a doughy, white bread bun (roll) speciality, particularly associated with Waterford, Ireland. It is currently made in County Waterford and south County Kilkenny.

== History ==
Blaas are sold in two varieties: "soft" and "crusty". Soft blaas are slightly sweet, malt flavour, light but firm in texture and melt in the mouth. Crusty blaas are crunchy at first bite, then chewy with a subtle malt taste and a pleasing bitter aftertaste from the well cooked, dark crust.

Eaten mainly at breakfast with butter, they are also eaten at other times of the day with a wide variety of fillings (including a type of luncheon meat often referred to as "red lead"). The breakfast blaa (egg, bacon rasher and sausage) is more common than the breakfast roll in Waterford.

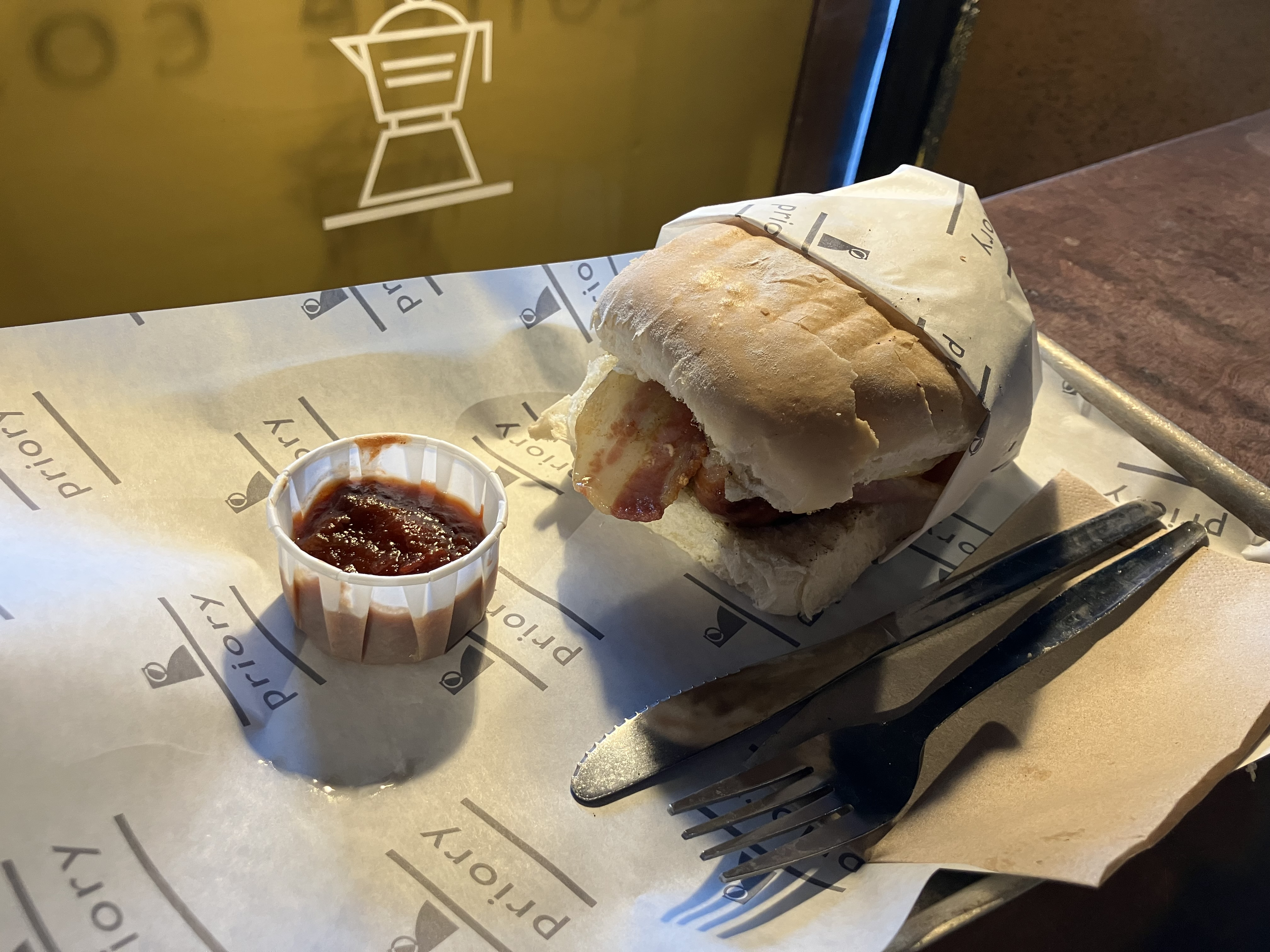
Breakfast blaa in Cork

A combined 12,000 blaas are sold each day by the four remaining bakeries producing blaas: Walsh's Bakehouse, Kilmacow Bakery, Barron's Bakery & Coffee House and Hickey's Bakery. Of the four remaining bakeries, only two remain in Waterford City. Blaas quickly lose their freshness and are best consumed within a few hours of purchase.

Some sources report that the blaa was introduced to Waterford at the end of the 17th century by the Huguenots. This theory is disputed because although white flour existed in the 17th century, it was not widely used until mass production of the industrial revolution. Darina Allen suggests that blaas are a by-product of baking larger loaves of bread, with the small pieces of leftover dough shaped and baked as rolls "often given away for free or bartered".

Blaas are sometimes confused with a similar bun known as a bap; however, blaas are square in shape, softer, and doughier, and are most notably identified by the white flour shaken over them before the baking process.

On 19 November 2013, the Waterford blaa was awarded Protected Geographical Indication status by the European Commission.

== See also ==
- Irish cuisine
- List of bread rolls
- List of breads
- List of buns
