= Bulkie roll =

New England sandwich roll

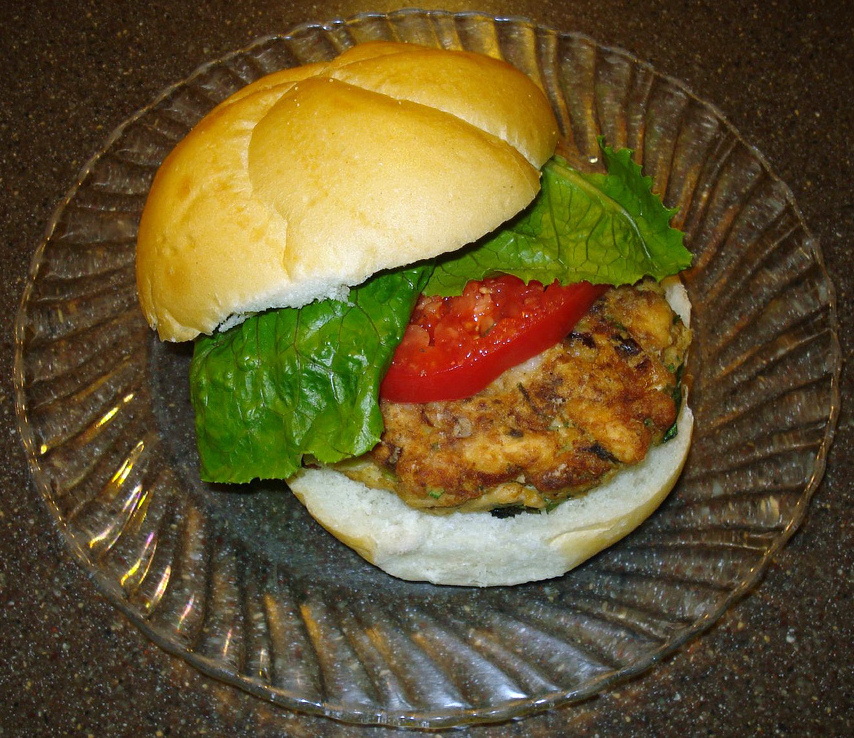
- Spicy salmon burger on a bulkie
- Alternative names: Bulkie
- Type: Bread roll
- Place of origin: United States
- Region or state: New England

A bulkie roll or bulkie is a New England regional variety of sandwich roll. Sandwiches made with bulkie rolls are common in area delicatessens, restaurants, and institutional food services. Bulkie rolls are larger and firmer than hamburger buns. The crust is usually slightly crisp or crunchy, but bulkie rolls are not hard rolls. The bread within the roll is similar to ordinary white bread, with a texture that is neither very chewy nor very fluffy, without any yellow color or egg taste, and not noticeably sweet. They are either plain or topped with poppy seeds.

They are similar to and sometimes equated with kaiser rolls, but kaiser rolls are noticeably sweeter.

== History ==
Lee Shai Weissbach writes of a Jewish grocery store in Manchester, New Hampshire, before World War II, whose owner was "affectionately remembered for 'the barrel of pickles and the hefty corned-beef sandwiches on bulkie rolls that he dispensed.'"

=== Etymology ===
"Bulke" or "Bilke" (בולקע/בילקע; transliterated bʊlkɛ/bɪlkɛ) is the Yiddish language word for a small roll made with fine wheat flour kneaded with eggs. It may be derived from a Polish word for roll ("bułka"): before the Holocaust, very many Jews lived in Poland; and about 15% of Yiddish words are from Slavic languages, including Polish.

== See also ==
- Bulkele, Bilkel, Bulkel
- List of bread rolls
- Sandwich bread
