= Spuccadella =

Italian-American bread roll

Spuccadella is an Italian-American bread roll that has a long, pointed shape. It is used in the preparation of the spuckie sandwich, which is what the "Italian sandwich" is called in some areas of Boston, Massachusetts. The spuckie is still available in some sandwich shops in the Boston area.

The name derives from the Italian spaccatella, a term given to various types of bread with a "crack" or split, generally on the top surface. Spaccatella is eaten at the table or used to make sandwiches.

== See also ==
- List of bread rolls
