= Tuna bun =

Hong Kong bun

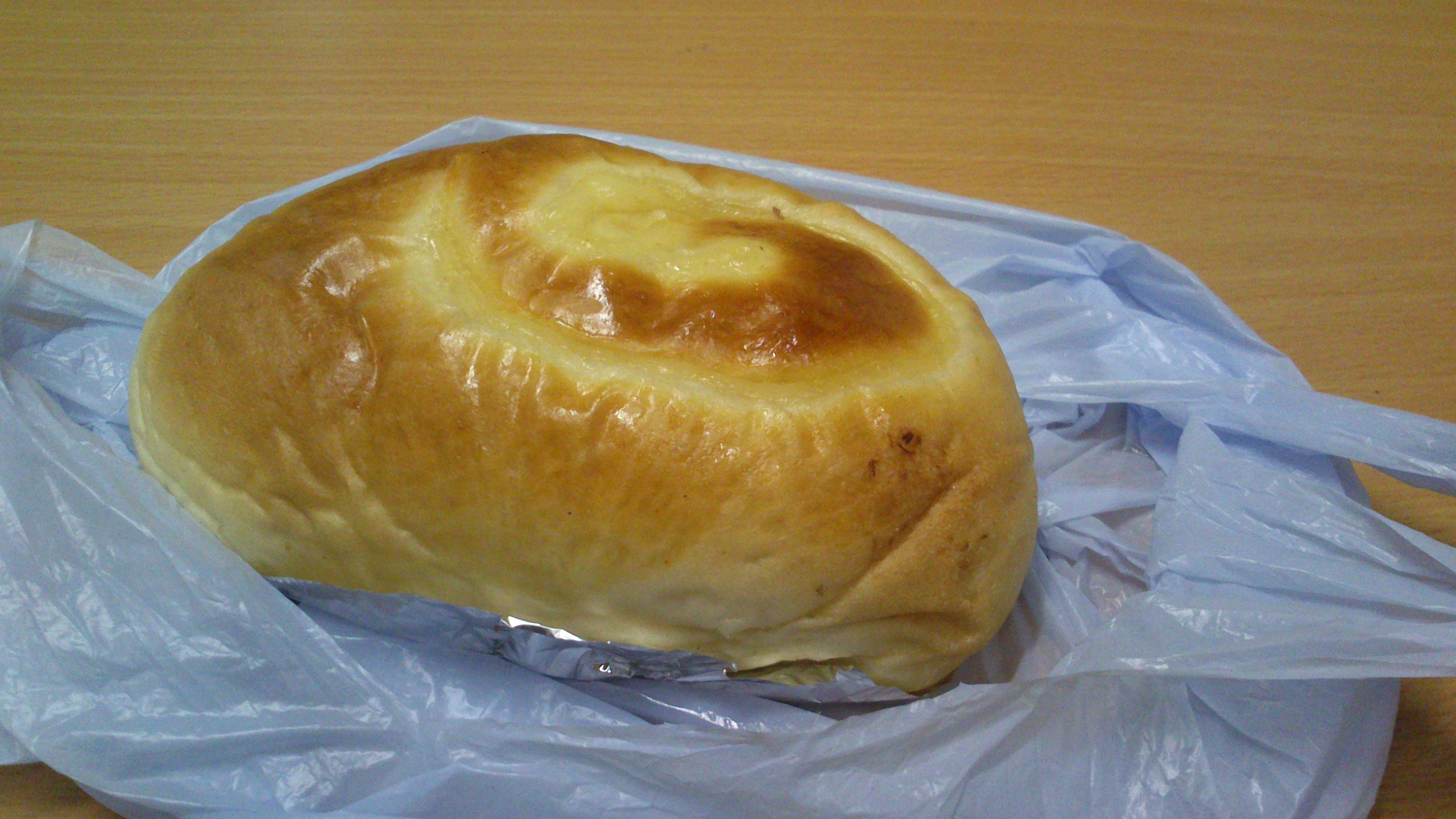
- Alternative names: Tuna fish bun
- Place of origin: Hong Kong
- Main ingredients: flour, tuna

Tuna bun
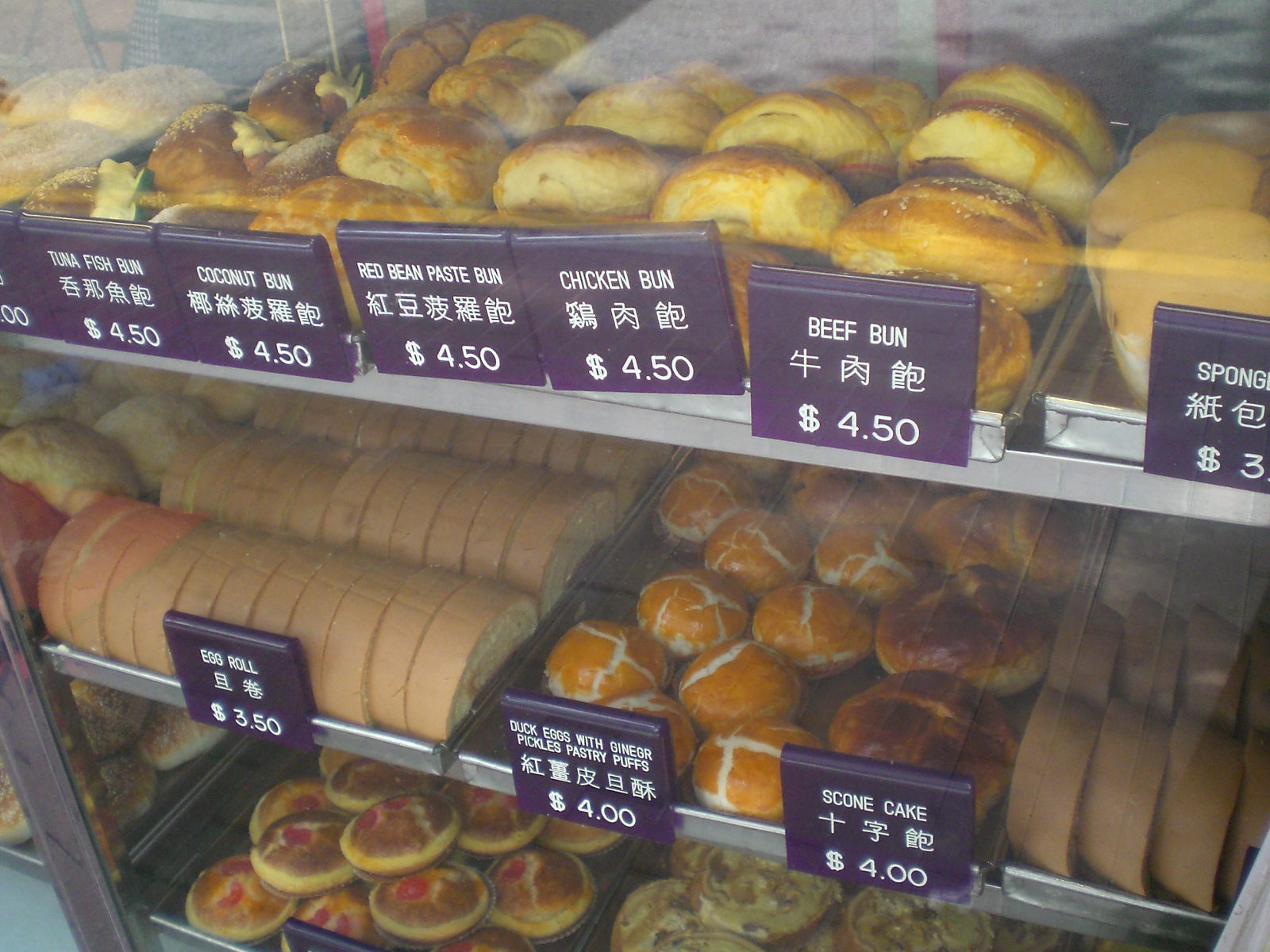
- Traditional Chinese: 吞拿魚包
- Simplified Chinese: 吞拿鱼包
- Jyutping: tan1 naa4 jyu4 baau1
Transcriptions
Yue: Cantonese
- Jyutping: tan1 naa4 jyu4 baau1

Tuna bun, Tuna fish bun (Chinese: 吞拿魚包; Jyutping: tan1 naa4 jyu4 baau1) is a Hong Kong-style fish bun. It is a bun that contains tuna paste. It is commonly found in Hong Kong.

Due to the high price of a whole tuna, almost all bakeries in Hong Kong use canned tuna to make tuna buns.

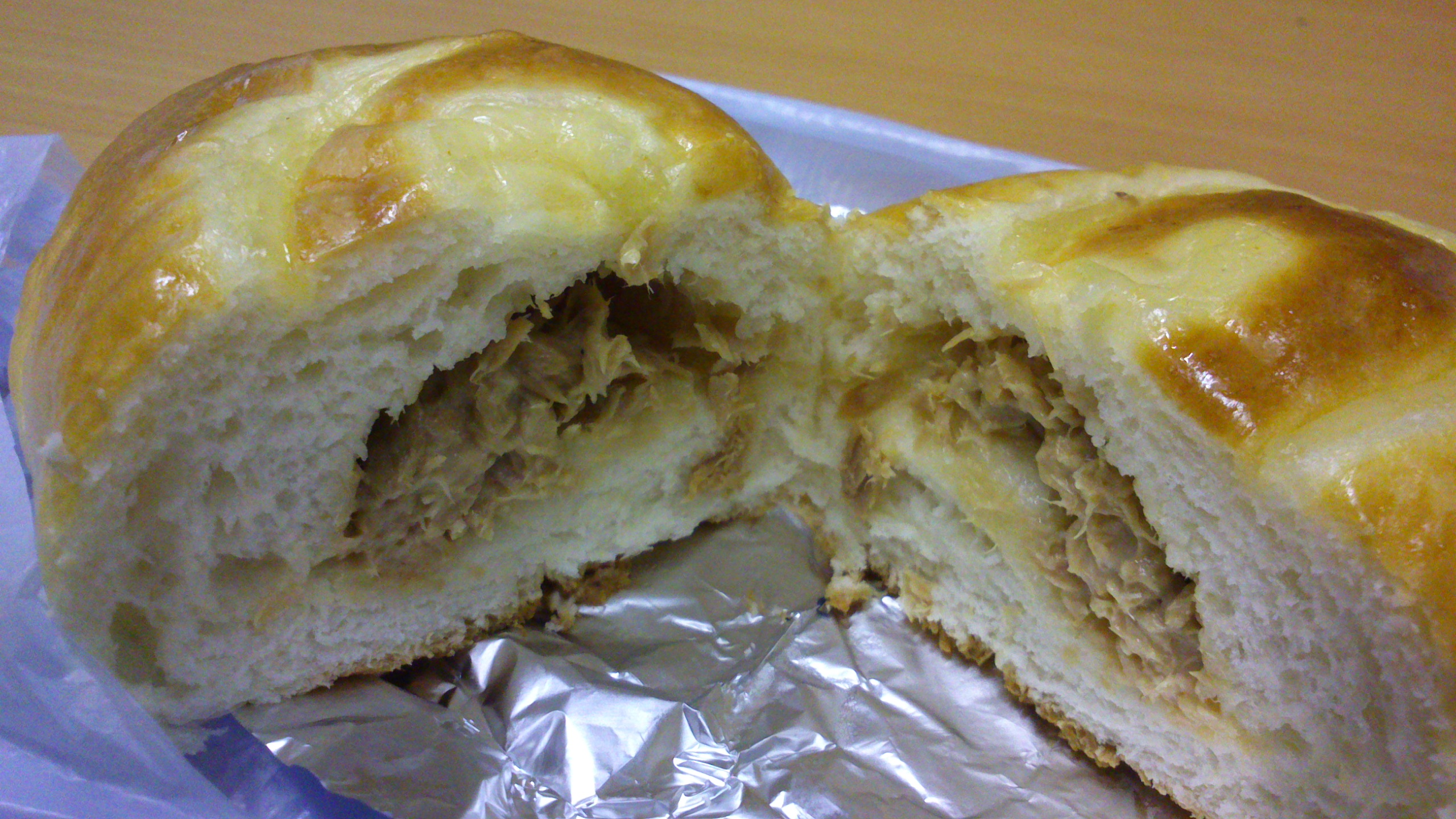
A tuna bun filled with canned tuna

== See also ==
- Tuna fish sandwich
- List of buns
