= Hoagie roll =

Type of bread

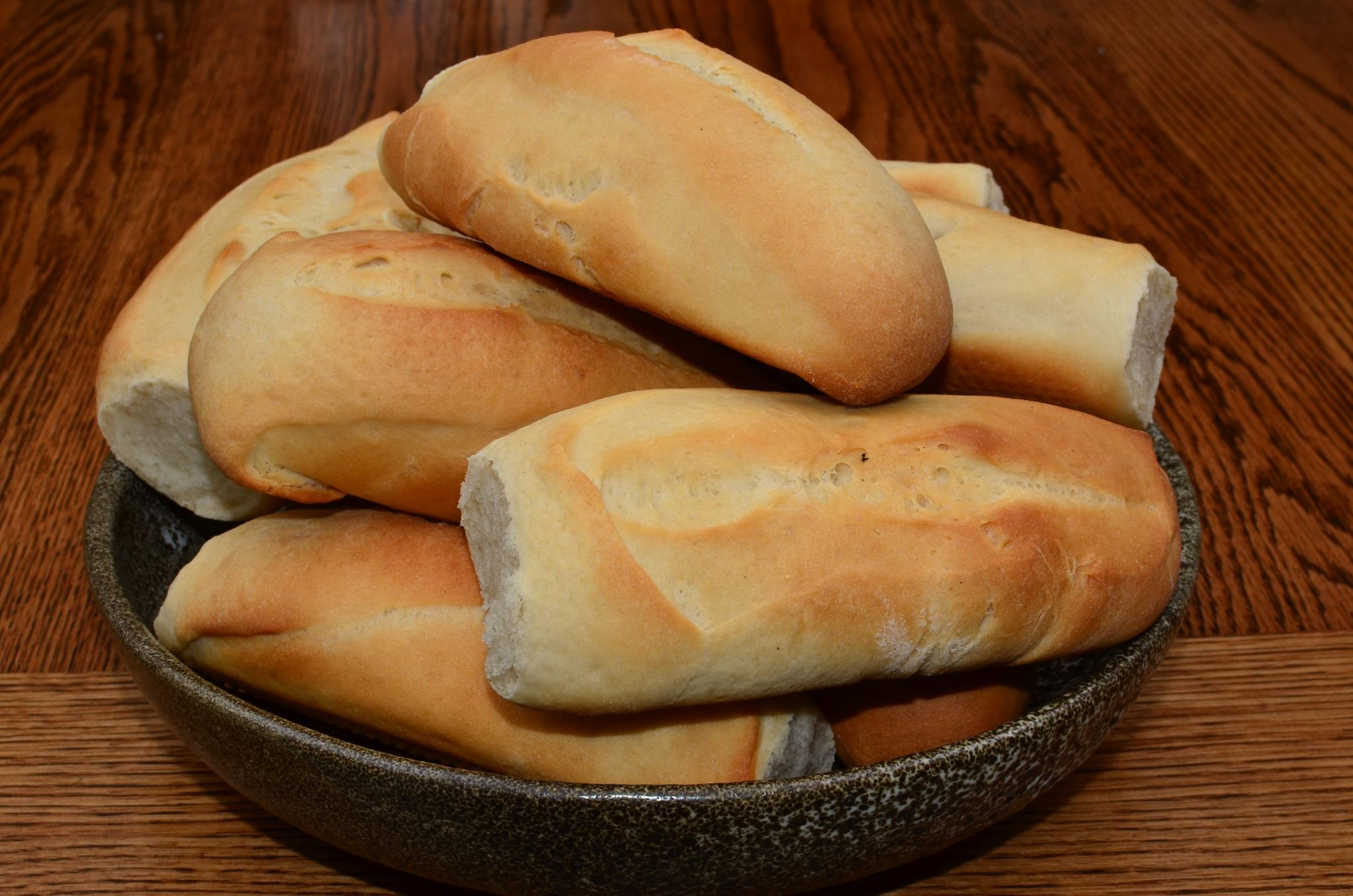
Fresh hoagie rolls

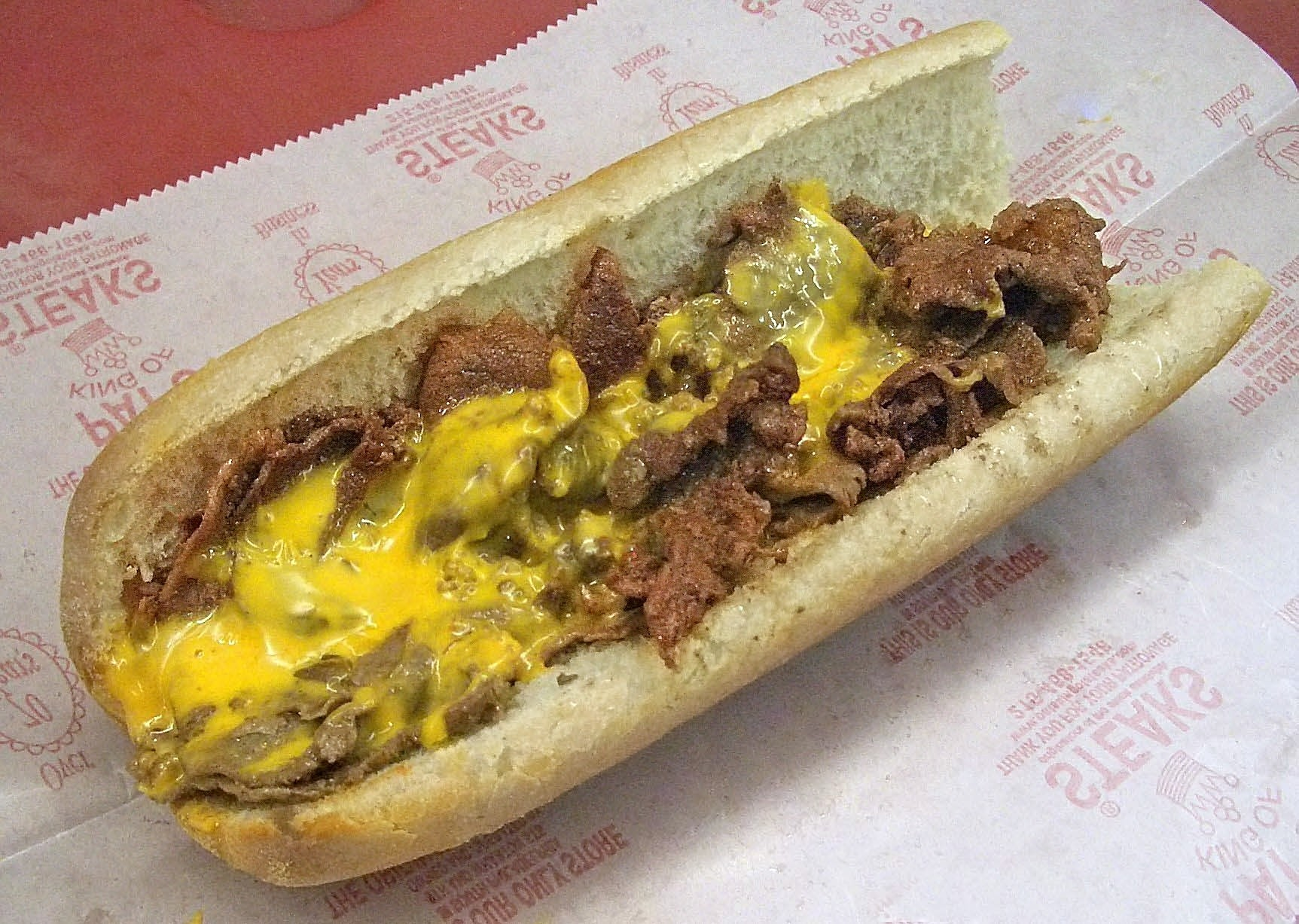
A cheesesteak sandwich prepared with a hoagie roll

In American usage, a hoagie roll is a long, crusty-on-the-outside, soft-on-the-inside bread roll used to prepare hoagie sandwiches, particularly in the Philadelphia area. Also known as a "sub" or "hero" roll. Key characteristics include a firm exterior that holds up to fillings and a tender interior. They are the foundation for classic sandwiches with cold cuts, cheese, and oil, vinegar, and oregano. Hoagie rolls are sometimes toasted before being used to prepare a sandwich.

Ingredients used in hoagie roll preparation may include flour, eggs, milk, vegetable oil, salt, sugar, and yeast. Some versions include sesame seeds atop the roll, which may add extra flavor and textural elements. Gluten-free and vegan hoagie roll recipes have been devised.

The hoagie roll is used to prepare the Philadelphia cheesesteak sandwich and various other submarine sandwiches.

== See also ==
- French roll
- List of bread rolls
- Sandwich bread
