= Rum roll =

Type of sweet yeast bread

Rum rolls are a sweet yeast bread topped with rum frosting and sometimes including raisins or currants. They were a specialty of Washington, D.C. and have been included on the menus of numerous historic Washington restaurants, though they are not commonly found in the present day.

Hogate's Restaurant was known for their version of the sweet bread, which included cinnamon and raisins, reportedly selling an estimated 20,000 buns per week until they closed in 2001. The restaurant's chef described the buns as their signature dish. They were also available at Flagship, another seafood restaurant located along the Southwest Waterfront in the 1970s. In 1979 The Montgomery Journal published the recipe for Flagship Rum Buns which were made with scalded milk and included raisins.
