= Qrashel =

Moroccan bread roll

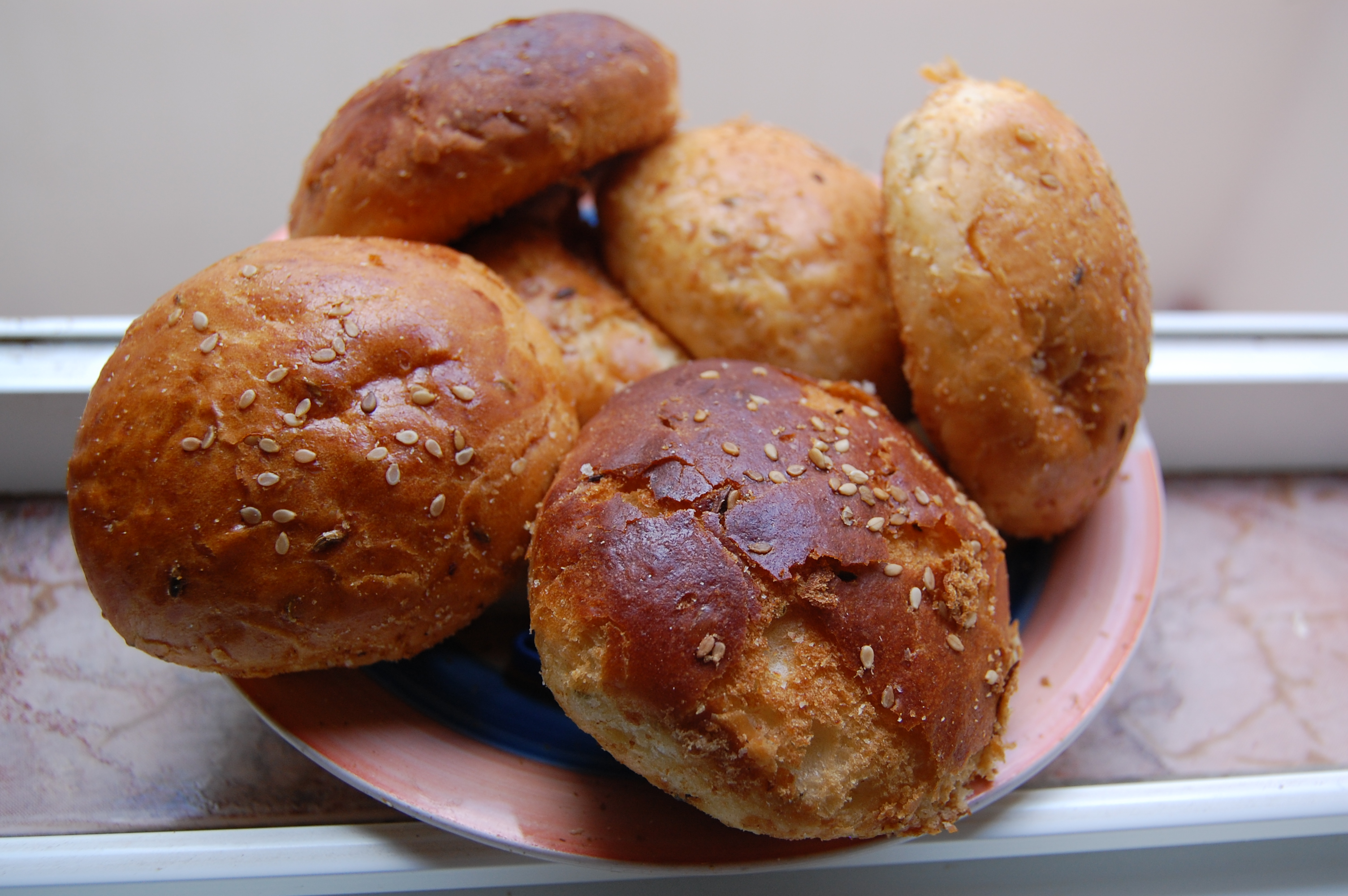
- Alternative names: Krachel, Lgorss, Moroccan sweet rolls
- Type: sweet rolls, buns
- Course: snack
- Place of origin: Morocco
- Associated cuisine: Moroccan cuisine
- Main ingredients: sesame; anise seeds; milk; eggs; sugar
- Variations: Qrashel with chocolate

Qrashel or Krachel (Moroccan Arabic: قراشل) or Lgorss (Moroccan Arabic: لڭرص) are Moroccan traditional sweet sesame rolls, made with anise and fennel. They can be served with tea or coffee, and dipped in cheese, olive oil, jam or honey. The rolls are similar to French brioche, but the anise seeds give them an extra flavor.

Qrashel are known in Moroccan cuisine at least since the late Wattasid and early Saadian era (mid 16th century). The Wattasid governor of Marrakesh, Nasser Bouchentouf, was notoriously murdered with poisoned Qrashel.

== Name ==
The Moroccan term "Qrashel" is in the plural form, with the singular "qershala", and diminutive "qrishla". The latter can also refer to small sesame Moroccan sweets, that otherwise share no resemblance with Qrashel.

The name of these Moroccan buns can differ from region to region. "Krach" is common in northern Morocco, while "krachet" is common in the southern regions.

== Recipe ==
The recipe for Qrashel can differ from region to region. But most commonly would include milk, eggs, anise seeds, sesame, sugar, baker's yeast, orange flower water, butter and flour. Some recipes also add chocolate.

The preparation of the dough can take up to 2 hours, while the baking can take around 30 to 40 minutes in a pre-heated oven to 350 degrees F (around 175 C).
