= Butterkaka =

Pastry composed of rolled buns

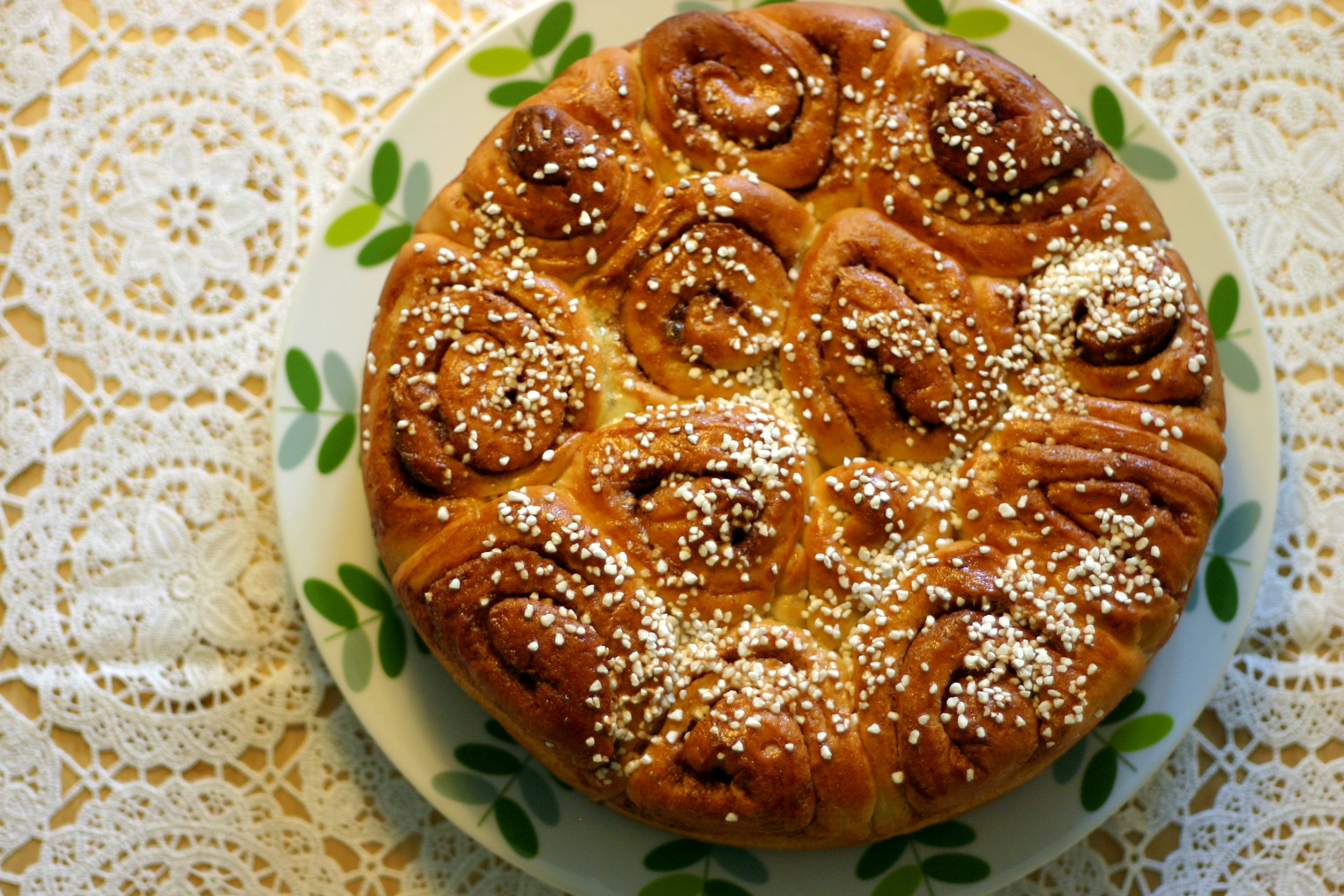
Simple butterkaka

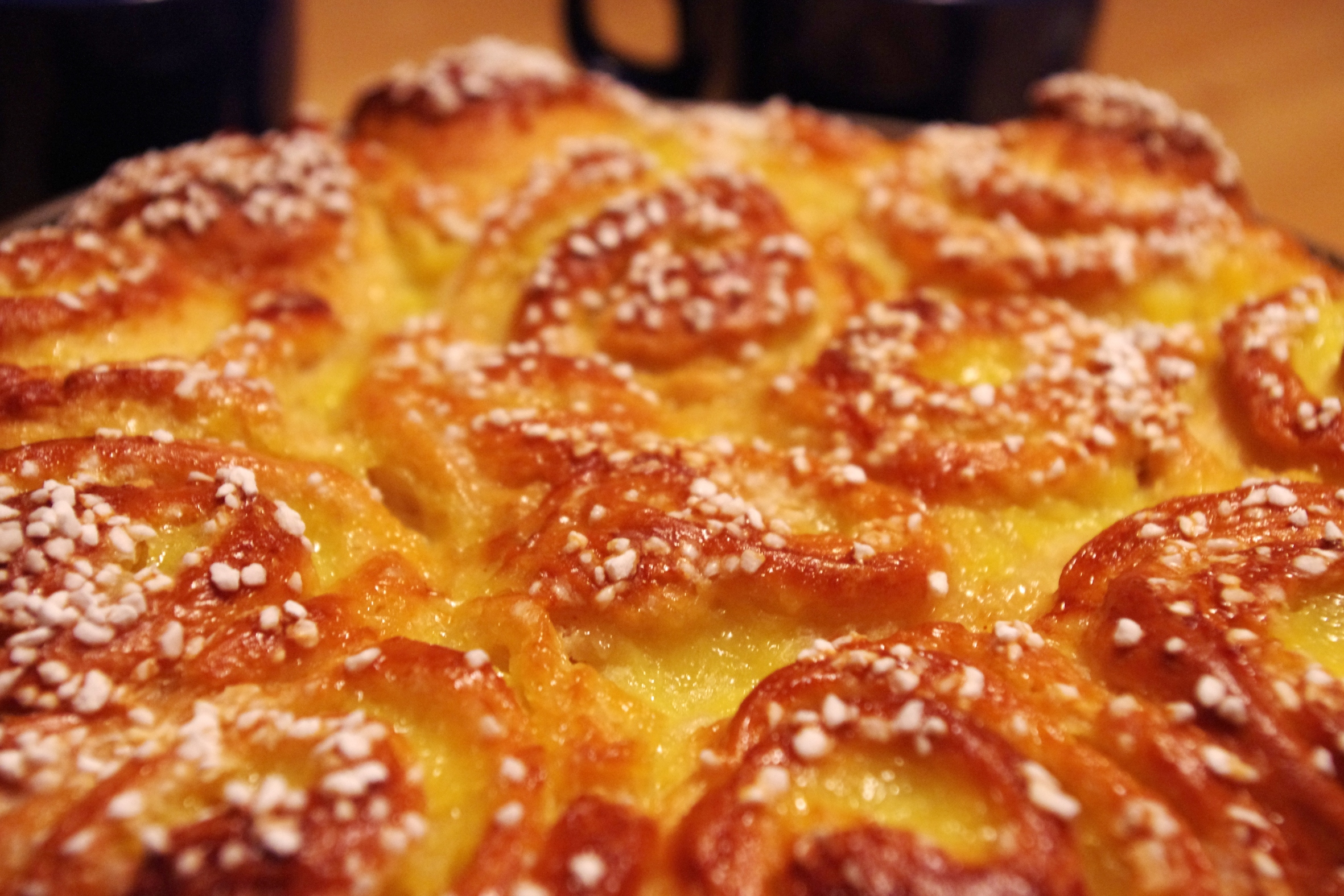
Butterkaka with vanilla cream

Butterkaka (butter cake), or systerkaka (sister cake) is a pastry composed of rolled buns. The buns are made in the usual way, similar to cinnamon rolls, by rolling out the yeast dough, adding the almond–cinnamon filling, rolling it up, and cutting the log into smaller rolls. These are laid beside each other, with one cut surface down, in a baking pan (usually circular), and during the process of rising and baking, the buns stick together (compare with monkey bread). Butterkaka is often garnished with vanilla custard and glaze.

In Finland, similar pastry is known as bostonkakku (Boston cake).

== Etymology ==
The name originates from the German name Butterkuchen, which, however, refers to a different pastry.
