= Cloverleaf roll =

American style of bread roll

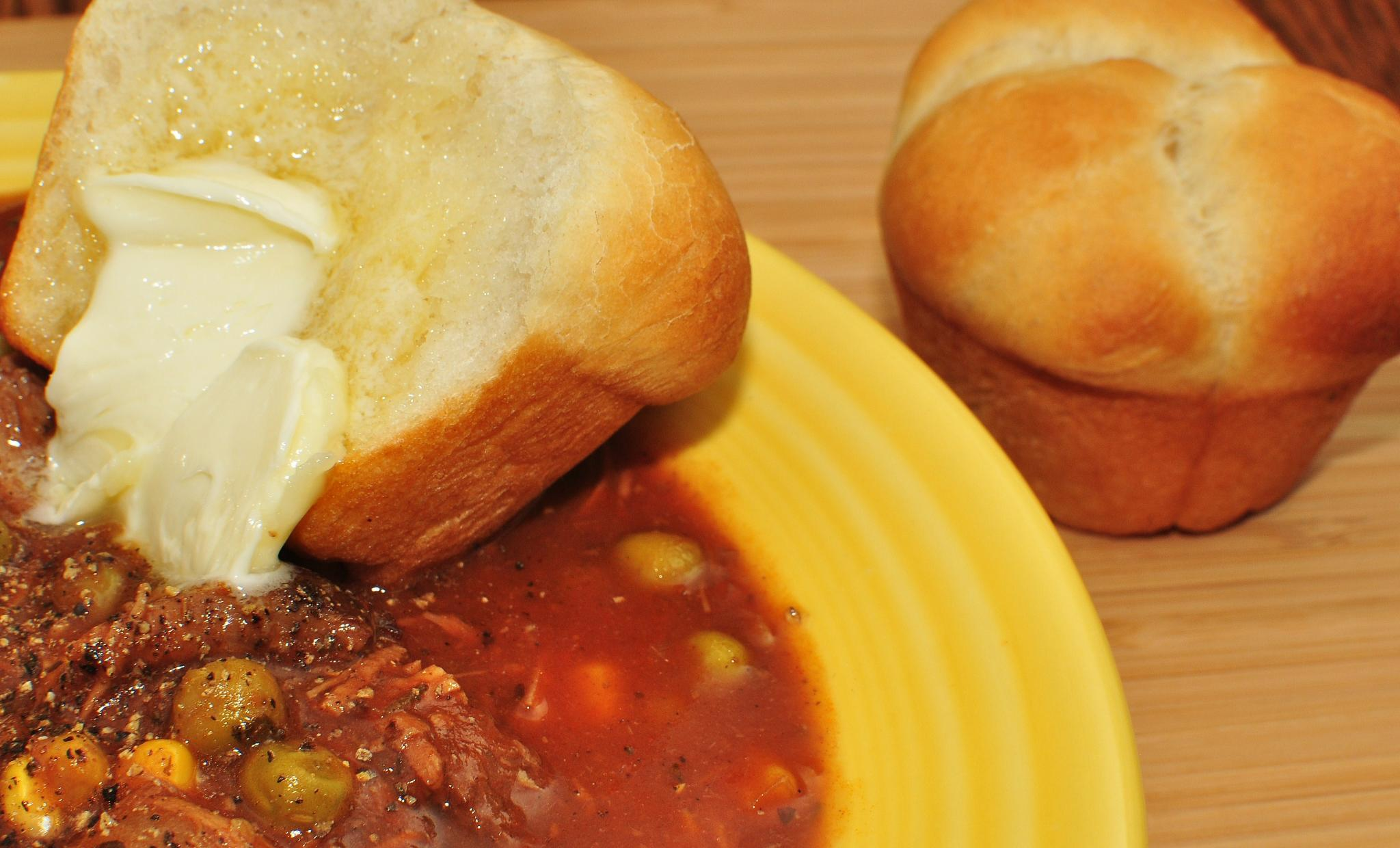
Vegetable beef soup with fresh cloverleaf rolls

A Cloverleaf roll is an American type of bread roll consisting of three separate sections. It is named after the leaf of the clover plant, which has three lobes. They are made by placing three small balls of dough in the cups of a muffin tin; as the dough proofs and bakes, the cloverleaf pattern is formed. After baking, they are easily pulled apart. "Cloverleaf roll" refers to a shape, not a specific recipe: many recipes lend themselves to the cloverleaving process.

== See also ==
- List of bread rolls
