= Bun =

Bread-based food

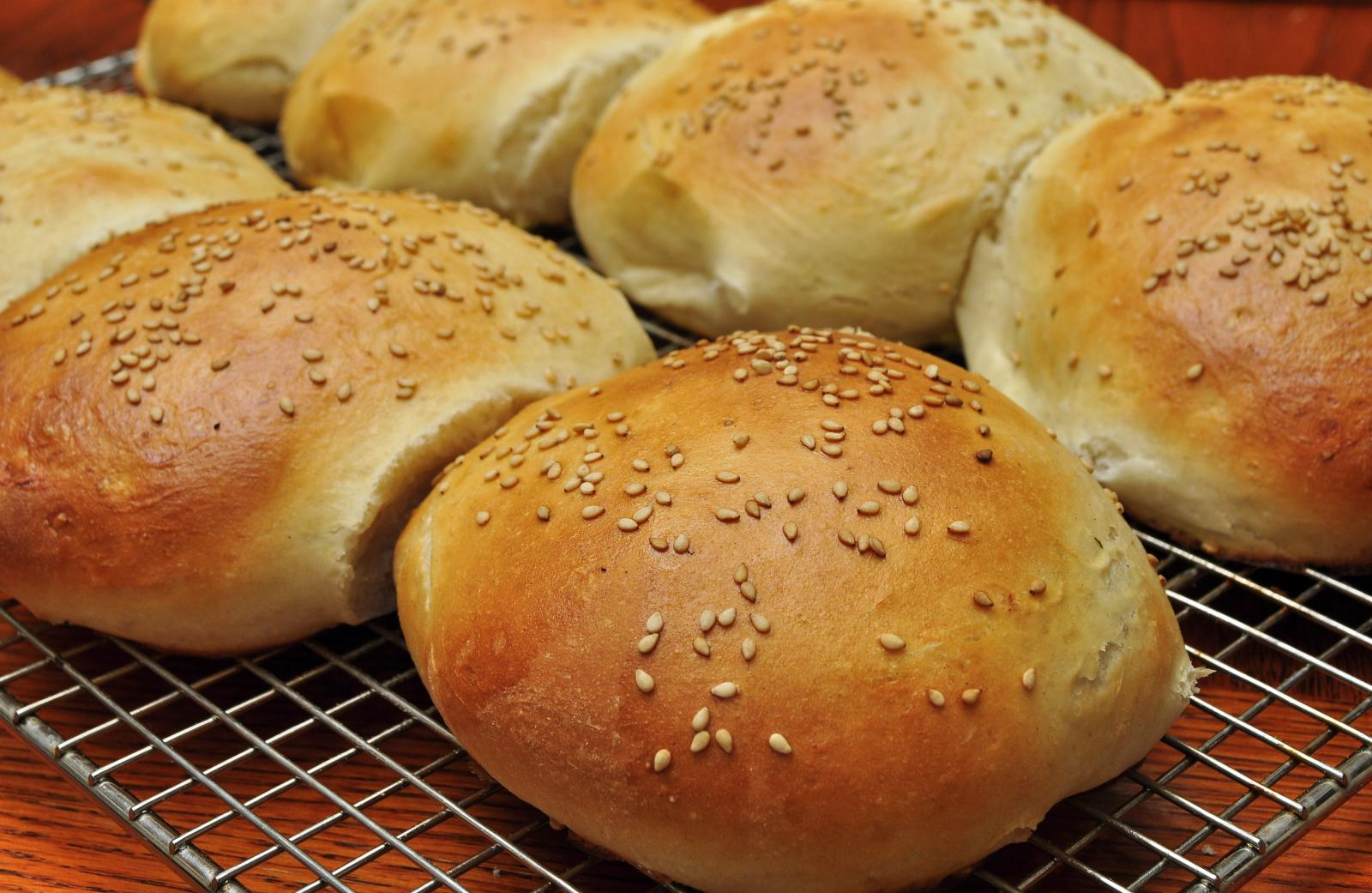
- Sesame seed buns
- Alternative names: bread roll
- Type: Bread
- Main ingredients: Flour, milk, yeast, sesame seeds

A bun is a type of bread that is round and small enough that it can generally be eaten hand-held. Whether a bun is considered sweetened or unsweetened differs between countries: it is considered sweetened in England, Scotland and Wales, (except for the North-East of England where it is both) a savory bread in Northern Ireland, and either a sweet bread or a savory bread roll in the United States.

== Terminology ==
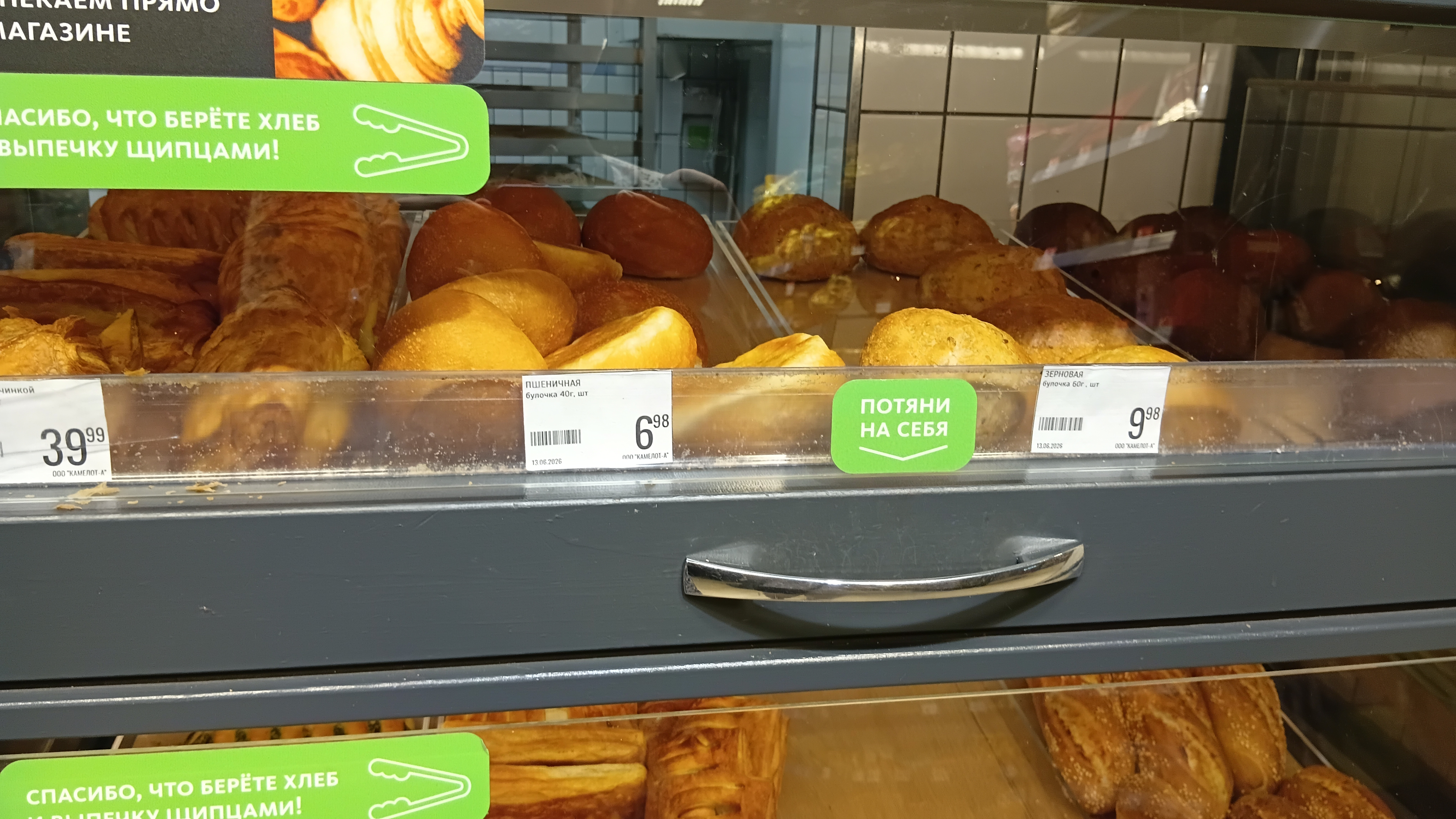
Buns on the store shelf in Omsk, Russia

In England, Scotland and Wales, a bun is considered a type of sweet cake, understood as very rich, spiced and studded with fruit in Scotland, seen in the example of the currant bun, except for the North-east where its used for both. In the US, a bun is understood as a bread roll, particularly one that holds a burger, and is cut horizontally. Chinese 包子 baozi, with savory or sweet fillings, are often referred to as "buns" in English.

== Composition ==
Buns are usually made from a dough of flour, milk, yeast and small amounts of sugar, butter, or oil. Sweet bun dough differ from bread dough as they may be enriched with the addition of sugar, butter and sometimes egg. Common sweet varieties contain small fruit or nuts, topped with icing or caramel, and filled with jam or cream. Many types of buns are brushed with egg yolk to produce a golden appearance.

== History ==
The etymology of the word bun is unclear. The Oxford English Dictionary pins the earliest known use to 1371 in the Assize of Bread and Ale, a law of Medieval Europe in the form "bunne" where they identify the meaning as "doubtful", understood from the context simply to refer to a type of "loaf or cake". As of the 14th century in Japan, steamed buns stuffed with vegetables or the sweet yōkan were eaten by Buddhists. By the 16th century in Europe, spiced buns, commonly served with sweetened wines or ale were consumed as part of funeral customs.

== See also ==
- List of buns
- List of breads
- List of bread dishes
- List of cakes
- List of pastries
- List of sweet breads
- Cheung Chau Bun Festival
- Chinese bakery products
