= Teacake =

Dessert item served with tea

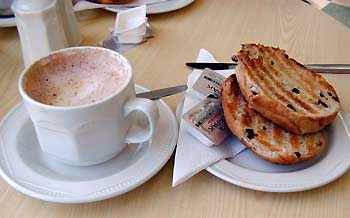
- A toasted English teacake (right) shown with a mocha
- Type: Sweet roll
- Main ingredients: Flour

Teacake is a term used for a variety of baked goods made across the globe. In the UK, a teacake is generally a light yeast-based sweet bun containing dried mixed fruit, typically served toasted and buttered. In the US teacakes can be cookies or small cakes. In Sweden, they are soft, round, flat wheat breads made with milk and a little sugar, and used to make buttered ham or cheese sandwiches. In India and Australia, a teacake is more like an American butter cake. Tea refers to the popular beverage to which these baked goods are an accompaniment.

== Regional variations ==
=== England ===
In most of England, a teacake is a light, sweet, yeast-based bun containing dried fruits, most usually currants, sultanas, or peel. It is typically split, toasted, buttered, and served with tea. It is flat and circular, with a smooth brown upper surface and a somewhat lighter underside. Although most people refer to a teacake as a cake containing fruit, in East Lancashire, certain areas of Yorkshire, and Cumbria the name currant teacake is used to distinguish fruited "cakes" from plain bread rolls.

In West Yorkshire, a large plain white or brown bread roll 9 inches or 225 mm diameter is often also called a teacake and is used to make very large sandwiches. Many cafes sell these for breakfast or midmorning snacks.

Like Chelsea buns, Yorkshire puddings, and Bath buns before them, Yorkshire tea cakes lost their specific attachment to a geographical English location. While the aforementioned were no longer only associated with specific places before the 1800s, the same happened to Yorkshire tea cakes during the Victorian era. It became defined as a traditional English food.

In Kent, the teacake is known as a "huffkin", which is often flavoured with hops, especially at the time of harvesting hops in September. In Sussex, a luxurious version of the teacake with added aromatics such as nutmeg, cinnamon, and rose water is still sometimes made and called a manchet or Lady Arundel's Manchet.

In East Lancashire, the former West Riding of Yorkshire, and Cumbria a teacake is a round bread roll which is cut in half to make sandwiches. They do not usually contain any sort of dried fruit. They can be made with either white, brown, wholemeal, or Granary flour (a brand of flour produced by Hovis, made by malting wheat, crushing the grains, roasting them, and then mixing them with brown flour).

=== Scotland ===
Tea cakes in Scotland are not a yeasted fruited bun, but actually Chocolate-coated marshmallow treats.

=== Sweden and Finland ===
In Sweden, the word for teacake (tekaka) refers to a sweetened wheat yeast bread. In Finland there is a similar dish called teeleipä.

=== United States ===
In the Southeastern United States, a teacake is a traditional dense large cookie, made with sugar, butter, eggs, flour, milk, and flavoring. They are particularly associated with the African-American community and were originally developed as an analog of the pastries served to guests by white women when entertaining.

=== Australia/India ===
In Australia and India, a teacake is typically a butter cake, usually ready to serve warm from the oven in less than 30 minutes. Ingredients typically consist of flour, eggs, butter, cinnamon, and sugar. It is traditionally served warm as an accompaniment to tea. Australian teacakes are sprinkled with cinnamon and fine (caster) sugar and are usually served warm from the oven with additional butter.

== See also ==
- Chocolate teacakes, a kind of chocolate-coated marshmallow treat
- Coffee cake, a class of cakes that are served with coffee
- Funing big cake
- List of sweet breads
- Madeleine (cake), a type of individual French cake, shell shaped
- Russian tea cake, also called Mexican wedding cookies, a kind of cookie that originated in Russia
- Tea (meal)
- Tea culture
- Tea loaf
