= Couque =

Couque may refer to:

- Couque suisse, a pastry
- Couque de Dinant, a hard Belgian biscuit
