= Bakery Nouveau =

Bakery in the U.S. state of Washington

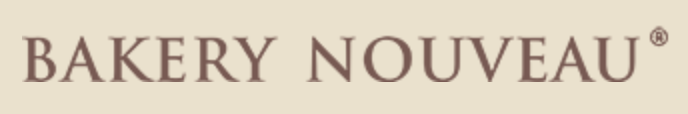

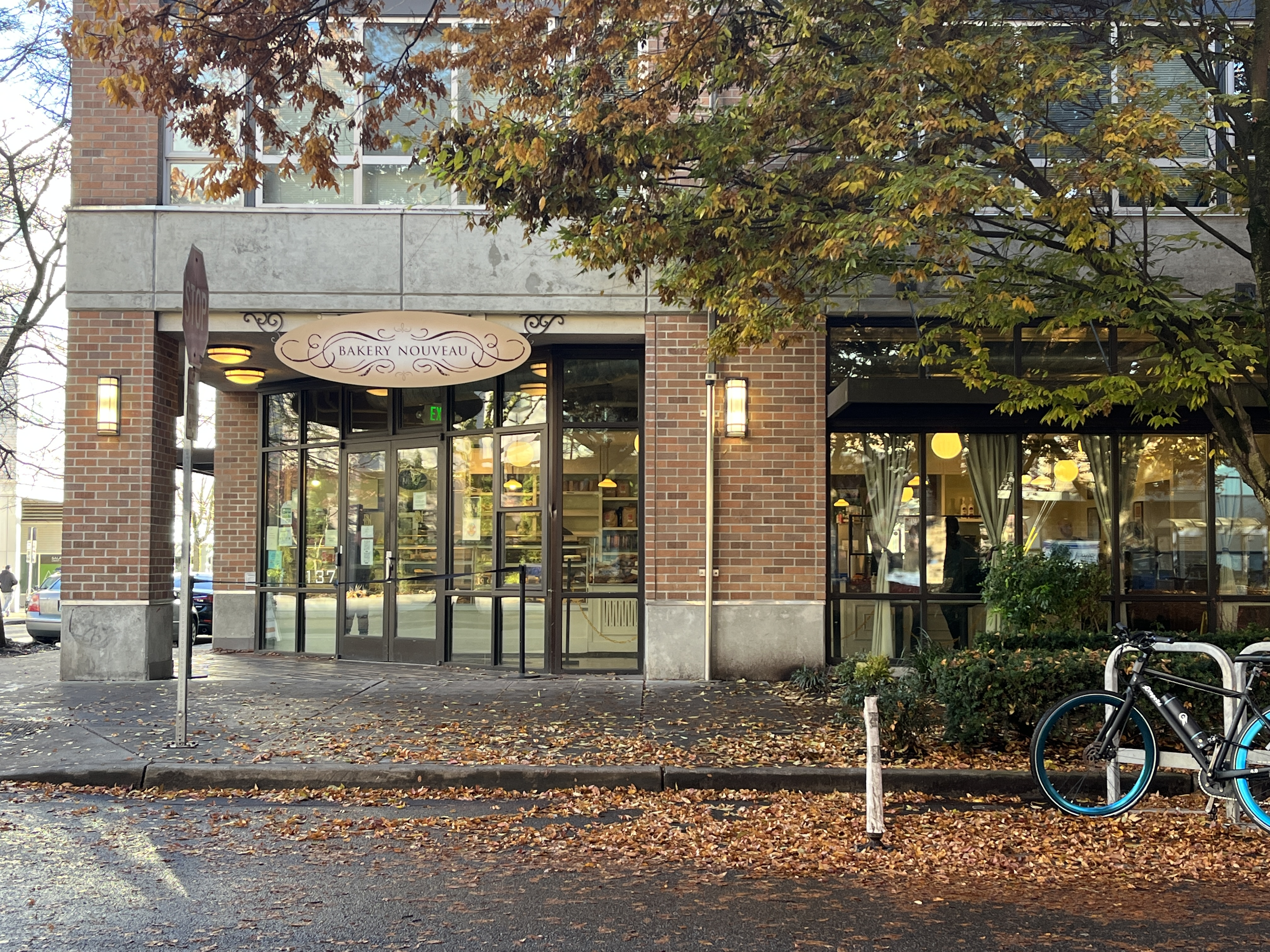
- Exterior of the bakery on Seattle's Capitol Hill in 2022

Restaurant information
- Location: Washington, United States
- Website: bakerynouveau.com

Bakery Nouveau is a small chain of bakeries in the U.S. state of Washington.

== Description ==
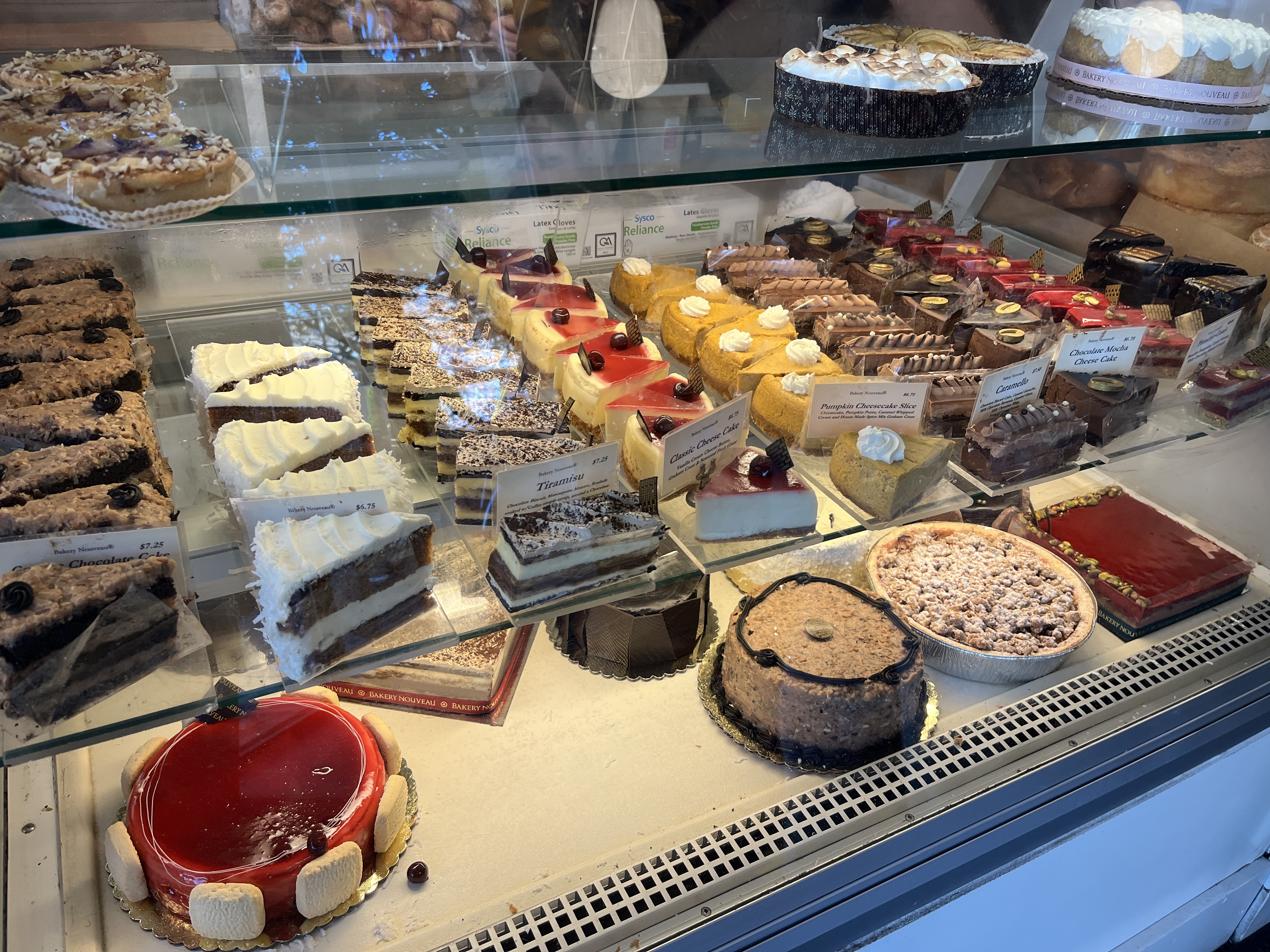
Interior display, Capitol Hill, 2022

Bakery Nouveau is a bakery with multiple locations in the U.S. state of Washington. Eater Seattle has described the business as "a bit of a throwback to mid-century European cafes". The bakery has served breads, French-style cakes, quiches, sandwiches, and other baked goods such as almond croissants and danishes. Cake varieties have included dark chocolate and strawberry pistachio.

For Easter, the business has offered hot cross buns, brioche rolls, spring cakes, chocolate eggs, and chocolate Easter bunnies (including dark, milk, and white varieties). Bakery Nouveau has carried pączki and king cake for Mardi Gras. For Thanksgiving, the bakery has served chocolate pecan pie, pumpkin cheesecake, and stollen.

== History ==
Owners William and Heather Leaman opened the original bakery in West Seattle. Subsequent locations opened on Capitol Hill in 2013, and in Burien in 2017.

== Reception ==
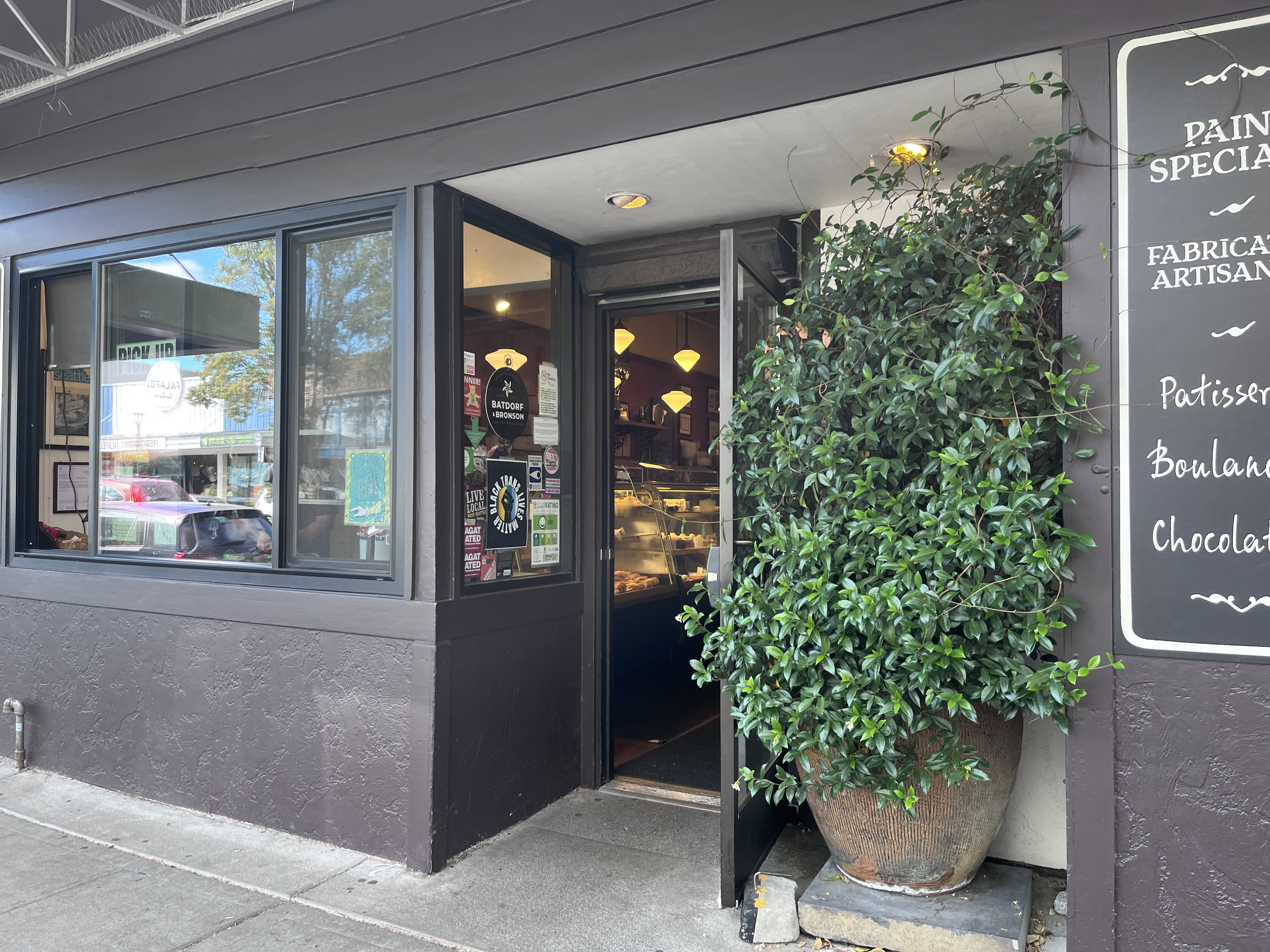
Exterior of the West Seattle location, 2026

In 2020, during the COVID-19 pandemic, Eater Seattle included Bakery Nouveau in an overview of "where to buy fresh bread and pastries for takeout or delivery in Seattle right now" and said, "this bakery has one of the widest and best varieties of spot-on pastries in the city". The website's Dylan Joffe and Gabe Guarente included the business in a 2020 overview of "where to order delectable pies in Seattle this Fall" and wrote, "Though many fans come to this West Seattle bakery for the twice-baked croissants, the multitalented shop also produces an impressive selection of rotating and seasonal pies and tarts. Dutch apple, coconut creme, and chocolate pecan are just a few favorites."

Alana Al-Hatlani included the bakery in Eater Seattle's 2021 list of "12 places to get some stellar cake slices in the Seattle area". The website also included Bakery Nouveau in a 2022 overview of the city's best bakeries. Aimee Rizzo of The Infatuation recommended the twice-baked almond croissant and wrote, "Lunch here is also great – the croque monsieur is one of the best ham sandwiches around."

== See also ==
- List of bakeries
