= Sugar Bakery & Cafe =

Chain of bakery cafes in Seattle, Washington, U.S.

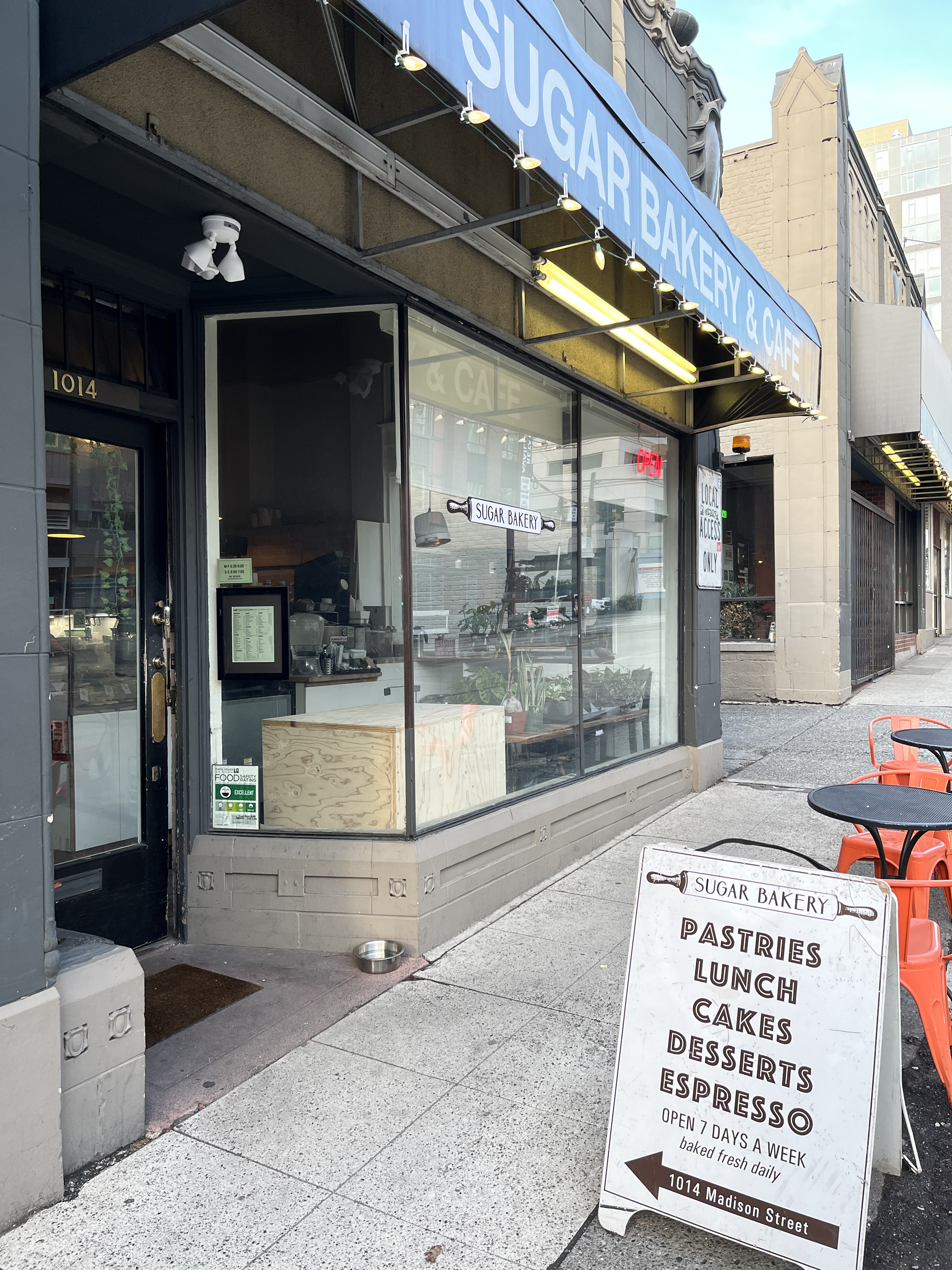
- Exterior of a shop on Madison Street, Seattle, 2023

Restaurant information
- Location: Seattle, King, Washington, United States
- Website: sugarbakerycafe.com

Sugar Bakery & Cafe is a small chain of bakery cafes in Seattle, Washington, United States.

== Description ==
Sugar Bakery & Cafe is an Asian-owned business operating multiple bakery cafes in Seattle. The interior of the First Hill location on Madison Street has pink walls and hanging rolling pins. The business also operates in Queen Anne.

=== Menu ===
Cookie varieties include chocolate chip and lemon crunch. The restaurant also serves croissants and cupcakes, including a sticky bun variety, as well as pies, bagels, sandwiches, soups, and coffee. Gluten-free options are available. Sugar also has seasonal options. For Mardi Gras, Sugar has also served bourbon pecan or vanilla cream cheese varieties of king cake. For Pride, the business has offered rainbow-themed cookies.

== History ==
Stephanie Crocker and John McCaig were the original owners. The business started in First Hill. Its roots trace back to 2003 and the first storefront opened in December 2007. According to Seattle Metropolitan, Sugar "was spun from a husband and wife's experimentation with the apples from a tree in their front yard". Crocker announced her retirement in late 2016.

== Reception ==
Kurt Suchman and Alana Al-Hatlani included Sugar in Eater Seattle's 2014 overview of the best restaurants for cake in the metropolitan area.

== See also ==
- List of bakeries
- List of restaurant chains in the United States
