= Sally Lunn bun =

English sweet bun

Sally Lunn
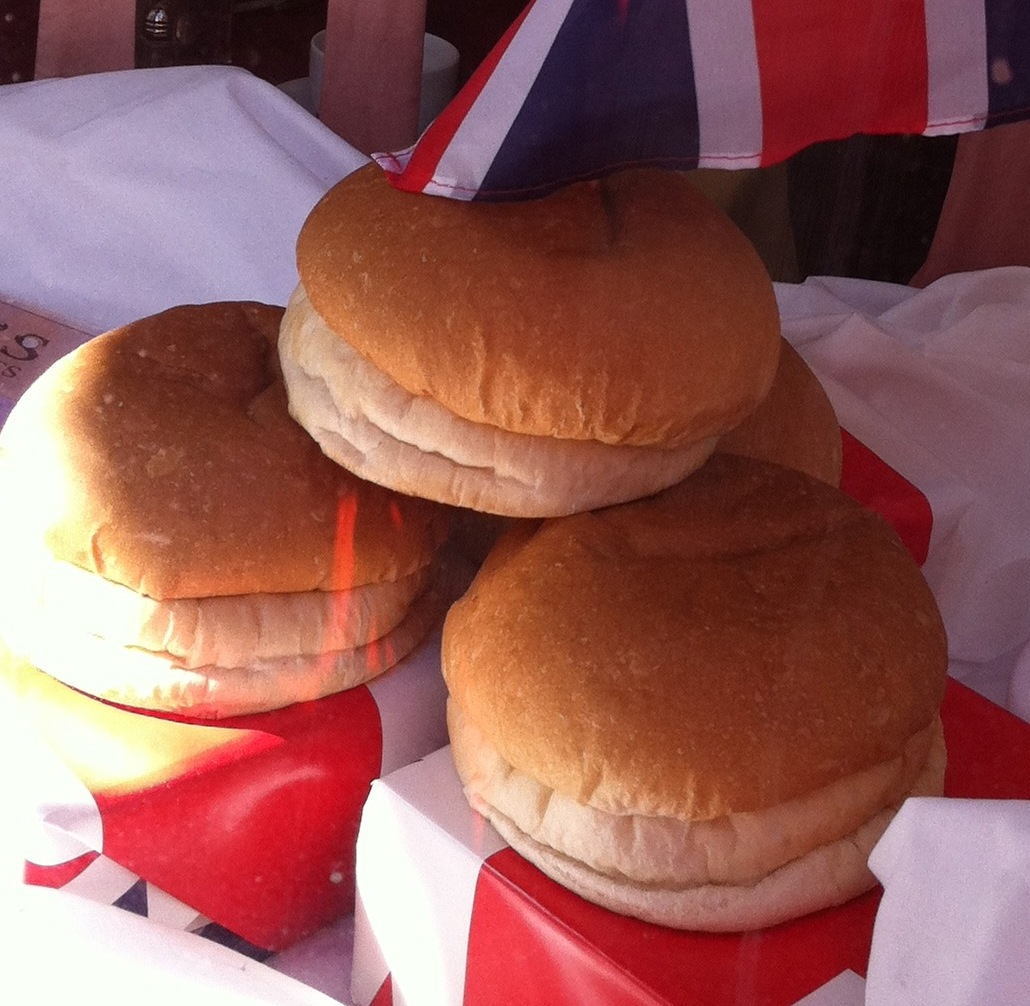
- Sally Lunn buns
- Alternative names: Sally Lun, or Lund, Solemena, soel leme
- Type: Sweet bread
- Place of origin: England
- Region or state: Bath, Somerset
- Variations: Solilemmes

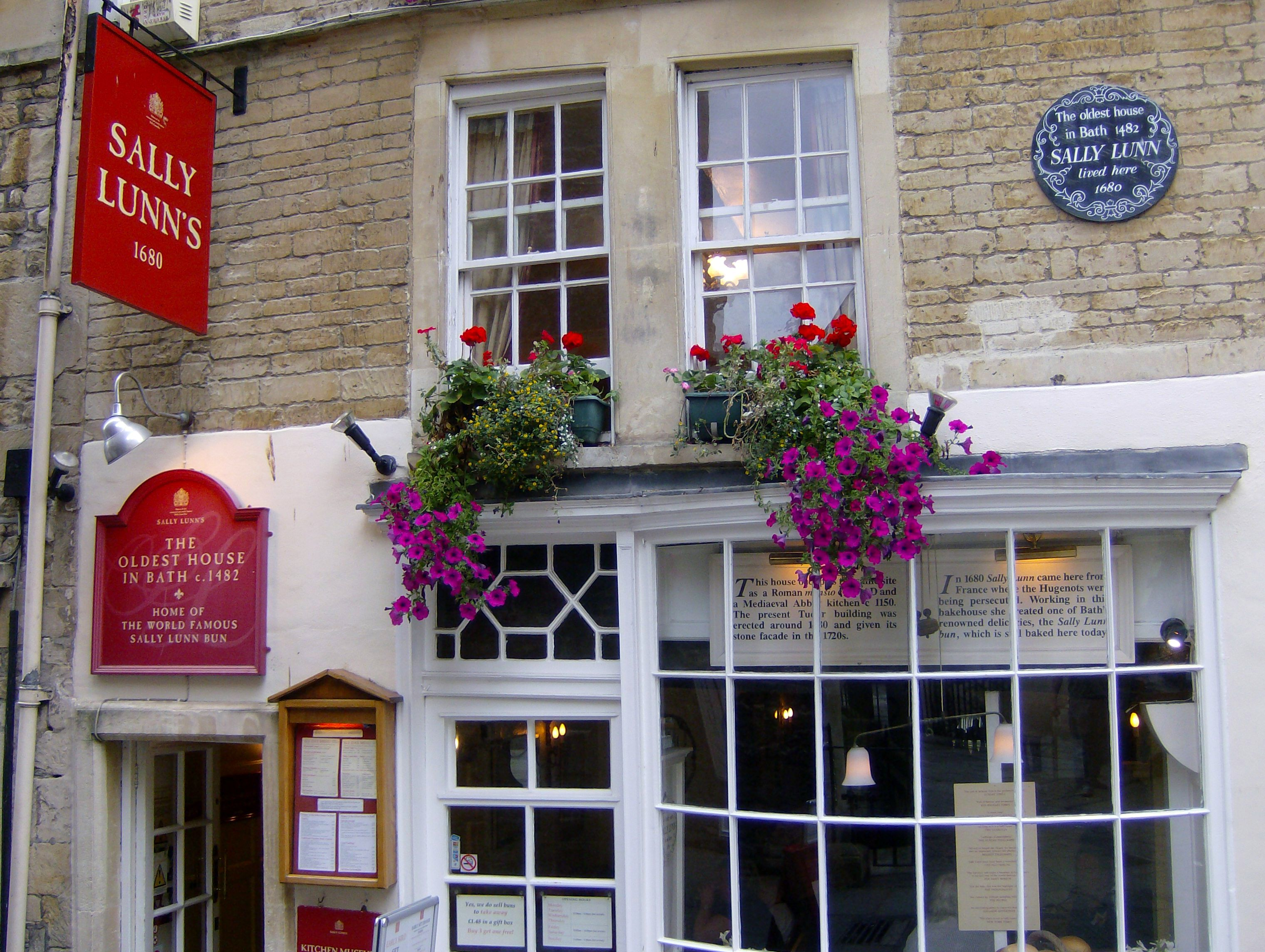
Sally Lunn's Eating House

A Sally Lunn is a large bun or teacake, a type of batter bread, made with a yeast dough including cream and eggs, similar to the sweet brioche breads of France. Sometimes served warm and sliced, with butter, it was first recorded in 1780 in Bath in southwest England. As a tea cake, it is popular in Canada and England.

There are many variations of Sally Lunn cake in American cuisine, some made with yeast, with variations that add cornmeal, sour cream or buttermilk to the basic recipe. The recipe was brought to the United States by British colonists, and new American variations were developed through the 18th and 19th centuries. It is claimed in one 1892 newspaper article that Sally Lunn bread became known as "Washington's breakfast bread" because it was so admired by George Washington. In New Zealand, the bakery item known as the Sally Lunn is not the same as it has a thick layer of white icing and coconut on top and is also known as a Boston bun.

== Origins ==
The origins of the Sally Lunn are obscure. One theory is that it is an anglicisation of "Soleil et lune" (French for "sun and moon"), representing the golden crust and white base/interior. Sally Lunn's Eating House in Bath, England, states that the recipe was brought to Bath in the 1680s by a Huguenot refugee called Solange Luyon, who became known as Sally Lunn, but there is no evidence to support this. Andrew Webb repudiates the Luyon theory in his 2012 book Food Britannia.

There is a passing mention of "Sally Lunn and saffron cake" in a 1776 poem about Dublin by the Irish poet William Preston. The first recorded mention of the bun in Somerset is as part of a detox regime in Philip Thicknesse's 1780 guidebook to taking the waters at Bath. Thicknesse describes how he would daily see visitors drinking 2–3 pints of Bath water and then "sit down to a meal of Sally Lunns or hot spungy rolls, made high by burnt butter!" He recommends against the practice as his brother died after this kind of breakfast: "Such a meal, few young men in full health can get over without feeling much inconvenience".

There is little historical evidence for Sally Lunn as a person. The Gentleman's Magazine of 1798 uses Sally Lunn as an example during a discussion of foods named after people—"a certain sort of hot rolls, now, or not long ago, in vogue at Bath, were gratefully and emphatically styled 'Sally Lunns'". But it is not until 1827 that a historical person is described by a correspondent of William Hone using the pseudonym "Jehoiada", who says she had sold the buns on the street "about thirty years ago". A baker called Dalmer had bought out her business and made it highly successful after he composed a special song for the vendors, who sold the buns from mobile ovens. The earliest evidence of commercial production is an 1819 advertisement for the Sally Lunn "cakes" sold by W. Needes of Bath, bread and biscuit maker to the Prince Regent.

Sally Lunns were mentioned together with muffins and crumpets by Charles Dickens in 1844 in his novel The Chimes. A year later, in 1845, Eliza Acton gave a recipe in Modern Cookery for Private Families, describing it as a version of "Solimemne – A rich French breakfast cake, or Sally Lunn". Solilemmes is a kind of brioche that is served warm which was popularised by the Parisian chef Marie-Antoine Carême in a book of 1815. Carême claimed the solilem originated in Alsace but there is no evidence to support that claim; he may have taken the idea from contacts in Bath and then tried to disguise the origins of a recipe that came from France's great enemy.

== Sally Lunn's house ==
The building now known as Sally Lunn's Eating House is at 4 North Parade Passage (formerly Lilliput Alley) in Bath (51.3808°N 2.3582°W). The site was originally occupied by the south range of Bath Abbey, and the lowest floor level dates to the reconstruction of the abbey after a great fire in 1137. The masonry oven in the basement dates from that time.

Journals in the 17th century published accounts of visitors to the various coffee houses and several assembly rooms in and along Terrace Walk & North Parade, but Sally Lunn is not mentioned in any of those reports.

After the Reformation, the ruins came into the hands of the Colthurst family of Wardour Castle, who sold the site to John Hall of Bradford on Avon in 1612. In 1622, Hall leased the site to George Parker, a carpenter who built the current house. The Hall estate was later acquired by the 2nd Duke of Kingston, who sold the house to William Robinson in 1743. There may have been baking on a small scale during the 1700s, but it only became the main commercial use of the building around the turn of the 20th century.

In the mid-19th century, Sarah Fricker, a tallow maker, occupied the building. Subsequent owners include Edward Culverhouse, a cab proprietor, (1904–1921) and Mrs Griffiths, a grocer (1922–1930). The building fell into a bad state of repair and was vacant in 1932–33.

Marie Byng-Johnson, an artist, moved to Bath with her daughter, a violinist, c. 1926, taking up lodgings at 13 Abbey Churchyard and giving piano lessons. She moved to 4 North Parade passage in 1934, trading as "Sally Lunn Ltd".

Byng-Johnson opened the building as a tea-room specialising in Sally Lunn buns, promoting them with a story that she had discovered an ancient document in a secret panel above the fireplace, explaining that Sally Lunn was a young French Huguenot refugee who brought the recipe to Bath around 1680. Remarkably, despite the importance of this priceless and historic document, she lost it.

The property has been a Grade II* listed building since June 1950. The listing summary states that "Sally Lunn, a pastry cook and baker, was a tenant in 1680" but cites no source to confirm that information. It is possible that English Heritage saw the sign on the wall (erected c. 1970) and took the claim at face value.

== See also ==
- Bath bun
- Boston bun
- Fruit bun
- Hot cross bun
- List of British breads
- List of buns
- Manchet
- Ralph Allen's Town House, Bath
- Tsoureki
