= Oxbow (restaurant) =

Bakery and cafe in Seattle, Washington, U.S.

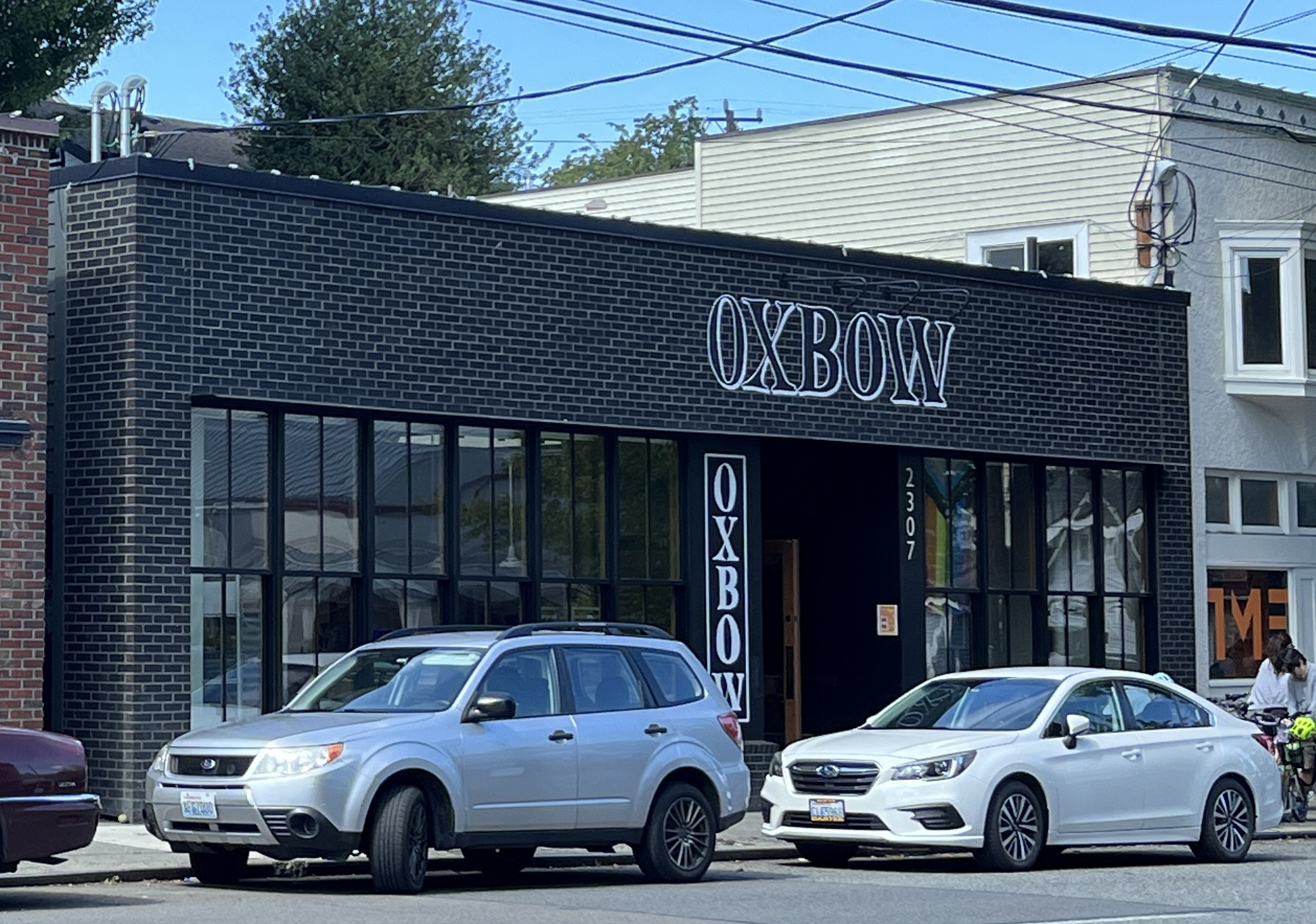
- The shop's exterior, 2024
- Interactive map of Oxbow

Restaurant information
- Established: May 25, 2022
- Owners: Jesse and Kit Schumann
- Location: 2307 24th Avenue E, Seattle, King, Washington, 98112, United States
- Coordinates: 47.6398°N 122.3023°W
- Website: oxbowmontlake.com

Oxbow is a bakery and cafe in Seattle, in the U.S. state of Washington. Jesse and Kit Schumann opened the restaurant in 2022.

== Description ==
The bakery and cafe Oxbow operates on 24th Avenue East in Seattle's Montlake neighborhood. It has been described as a bagel and pizza shop, as well as an off-shoot of Sea Wolf. Bethany Jean Clement of The Seattle Times has described Oxbow as an "airy, pleasantly basic space" that is "gratuity-free, building fair wages, health insurance and paid vacation for staff into their prices".

The business serves bagels, pastries, pizza, quiches, sticky buns, and scones. Among pizzas is a white variety with lemon zest; other pizza toppings include anchovy, eggplant, leeks, potato, and delicata squash. According to Clement, pizzas are "coated with cornmeal, fine enough to obviate grittiness". Bagel varieties include cinnamon raisin, poppyseed, pumpernickel, and salt, and spread options include cream cheese, peanut butter, salmon, scallion, and sun-dried tomato. Drinks include beer, coffee and espresso options, and wine.

Oxbow uses flour from Cairnspring Mills and coffee beans from Hyacinth Coffee, and carries beers by Cloudburst.

== History ==
Oxbow is owned by Jesse and Kit Schumann, who opened the bakery on May 25, 2022. Oxbow initially operated via take-out due to indoor dining restrictions caused by the COVID-19 pandemic. Shortly after the bakery opened, J. Kenji López-Alt "gave the bagels a shoutout" on Instagram, which Jade Yamazaki Stewart of Eater Seattle suggested may have helped to boost business. The shop hosted a series of musicians in 2024.

== Reception ==
Naomi Tomky included Oxbow in Thrillist's 2022 overview of "where to eat in Seattle right now", or "must-hit new restaurants". In 2023, Harry Cheadle of Eater Seattle called Oxbow's pizzas "an underrated go-to lunch", and Melissa Santos ranked the business third in Axios Seattle's overview of the city's best bagels. She wrote: "Oxbow steers clear of what I consider the biggest bagel crime, which is making bagels that are too soft (you know, the kind with the texture of a Thanksgiving dinner roll.) By contrast, when you squeeze these bagels, the outer shell crackles a bit, which almost always signals good texture to come." Aimee Rizzo of The Infatuation said the bagels "have a crackly, Magic Shell-like exterior, complete with a dense chew and slightly sour tang". She recommended the garlic bagel with calabrian chili cream cheese and wrote, "Just be warned that these bagels have a shelf life of approximately one hour or so before they turn into bricks."

== See also ==
- List of bakeries
