= Sea Wolf (bakery) =

Restaurant in Seattle, Washington, U.S.

- Interactive map of Sea Wolf

Restaurant information
- Location: 3617 Stone Way N Suite 101, Seattle, King, Washington, 98103, United States
- Coordinates: 47.6511°N 122.3432°W

Sea Wolf (also known as Sea Wolf Bakers and Sea Wolf Bakery) is a bakery in Seattle's Fremont neighborhood, in the U.S. state of Washington. Jesse and Kit Schumann are co-owners; the brothers founded the business in 2014. The menu includes breads, pizza, cinnamon rolls, cookies, croissants, and other pastries. One savory croissant has zucchini, sunflower seed pesto, and pecorino.

In 2020, David Landsel included Sea Wolf in Food & Wine's list of the 100 best bakeries in the U.S.

== See also ==
- List of bakeries
- Oxbow (restaurant)
