= Boston bun =

Sweet roll with spices and thick icing

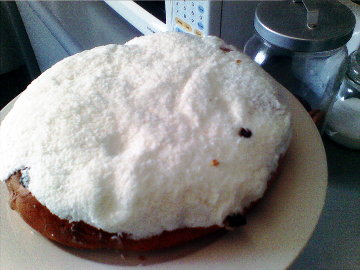
- Alternative names: Sally Lunn
- Type: Spiced bun
- Place of origin: Australia, New Zealand
- Main ingredients: Wheat flour, raising agent, water or milk, sugar, dried fruit, spices, coconut icing

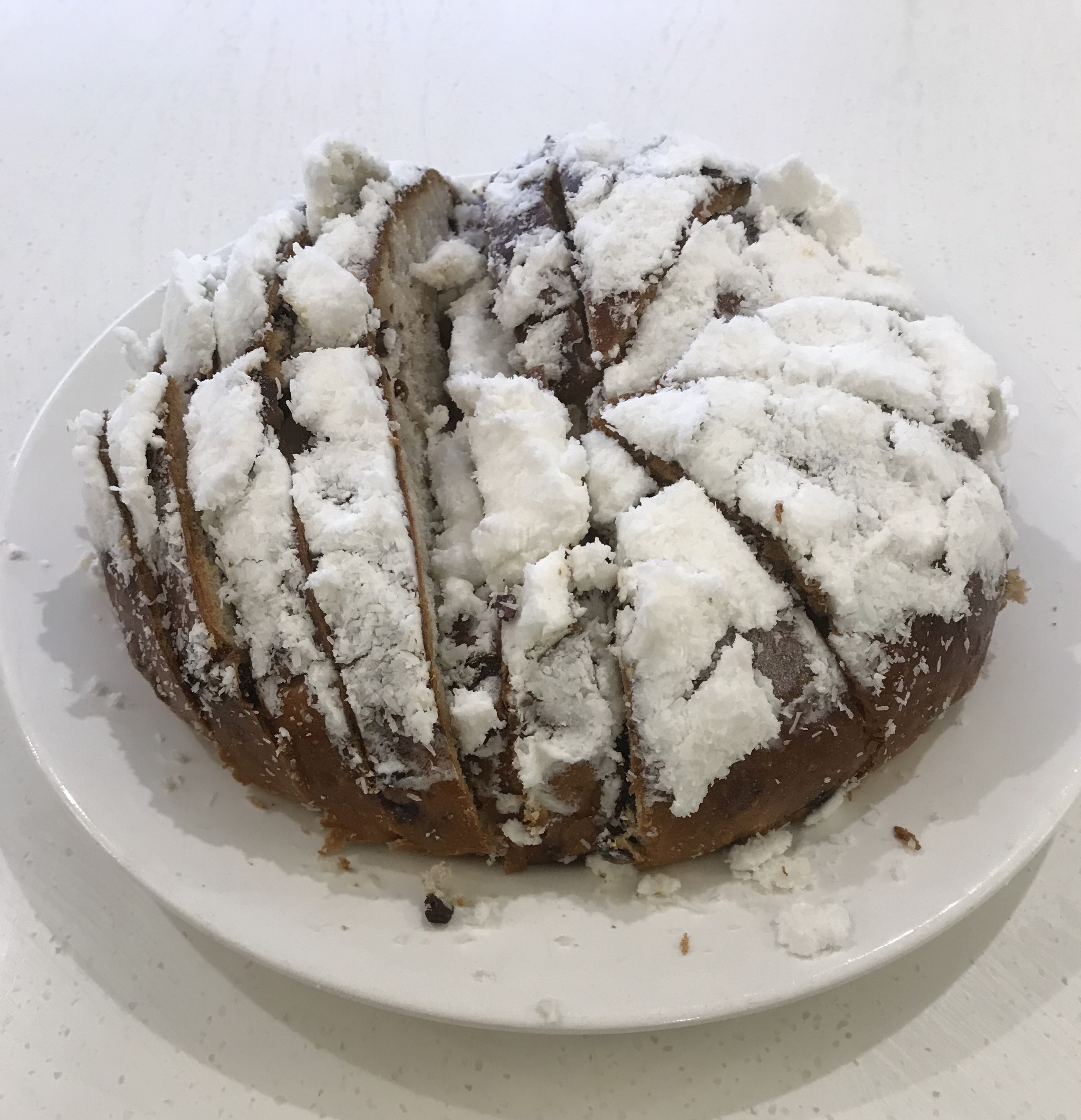
A cut Boston bun

A Boston bun, also known as a Sally Lunn, is a large spiced bun with a thick layer of coconut icing, prevalent in Australia and New Zealand. Traditionally the bun contains sieved mashed potato, and modern versions sometimes contain raisins or sultanas, the inclusion of which dates from the 1930s. Records for the sale of a product named "Boston Bun" can be found dating from the early 20th century. It is often served sliced and buttered, to accompany a cup of tea. The origin of the name is unknown.

== See also ==
- Sally Lunn bun
- List of buns
