= Bath bun =

Sweet bun topped with crushed sugar

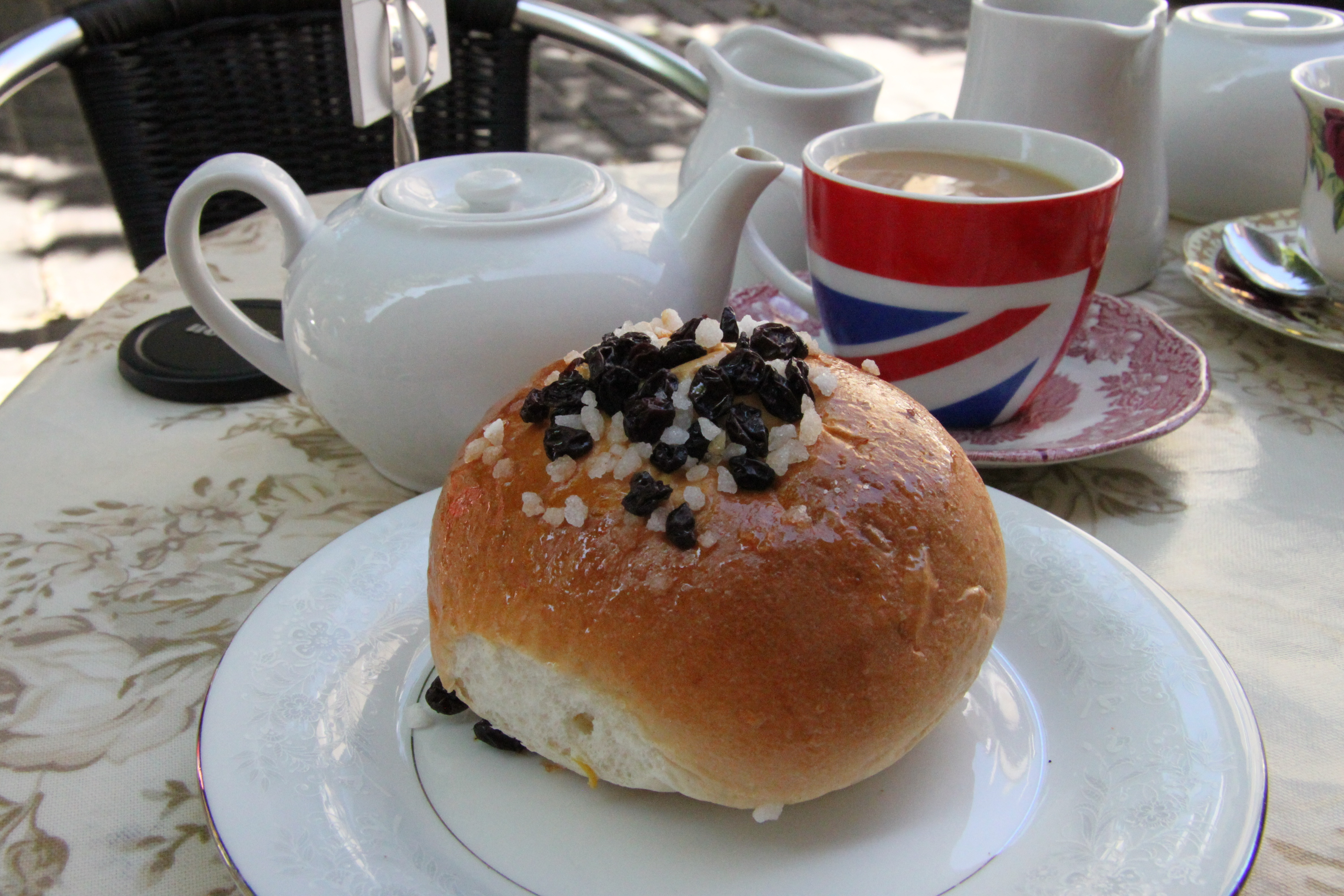
- Bath bun topped with sugar and raisins
- Type: Sweet roll
- Place of origin: England
- Region or state: Somerset
- Main ingredients: Sugar, candied fruit peel, currants or raisins or sultanas

The Bath bun is a sweet roll made from a milk-based yeast dough with crushed sugar sprinkled on top after baking. Variations in ingredients include enclosing a lump of sugar in the bun or adding candied fruit peel, currants, raisins or sultanas.

The change from a light, shaped bun to a heavier, often fruited or highly sugared irregular one may date from the Great Exhibition of 1851 when almost a million were produced and consumed in five and a half months (the "London Bath bun").

References to Bath buns date from 1763, and Jane Austen wrote in a letter of "disordering my stomach with Bath Bunns" in 1801. The original 18th-century recipe used a brioche or rich egg and butter dough which was then covered with caraway seeds coated in several layers of sugar, similar to French dragée.

The bun's creation is attributed to William Oliver, a prominent 18th century physician in Bath, Somerset, England. Oliver also created the Bath Oliver dry biscuit after the bun proved too fattening for his rheumatic patients. The bun may also have descended from the 18th-century "Bath cake". The buns are still produced in the Bath area.

Although this is disputed, the 18th-century "Bath cake" may also have been the forerunner of the Sally Lunn bun, which also originates from Bath.

== See also ==
- Fruit bun
- Hot cross bun
- Manchet
- Sally Lunn bun
- List of British breads
- List of buns
- Semla
