= Funing County, Jiangsu =

Funing 阜宁县 Fowning
- County
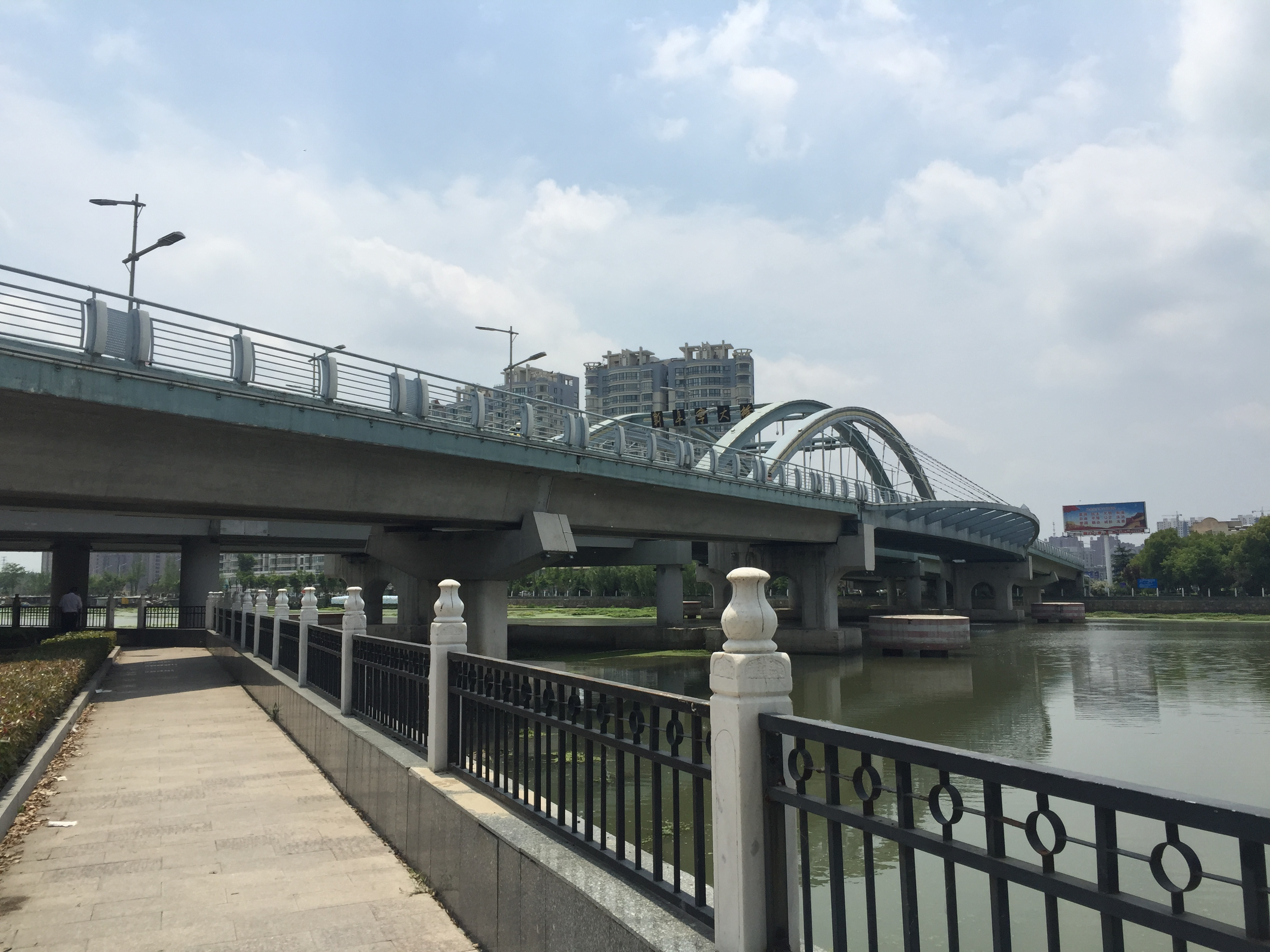
- Funing County in January 2016

- Location in Jiangsu
- Coordinates: 33°41′13″N 119°43′44″E
- Country: People's Republic of China
- Province: Jiangsu
- Prefecture-level city: Yancheng

Area
  - County: 1,439 km^{2} (556 sq mi)

Population (2020)
  - County: 794,036
  - Density: 551.8/km^{2} (1,429/sq mi)
  - Urban: 465,096
- Time zone: UTC+8 (China Standard)
- Area code: 224400

Funing County (simplified Chinese: 阜宁县; traditional Chinese: 阜寧縣; pinyin: Fùníng Xiàn) is under the administration of Yancheng, Jiangsu province, China. The county borders the prefecture-level city of Huai'an to the west. It has a population of 794,036, with 465,096 in the urban area, and a jurisdiction area of 1,436 km^{2}. It is under the jurisdiction of Yancheng municipality. The county was incorporated in 1731. Its seat of government is located at Fucheng Town. Funing is a 400-km drive from Shanghai via the G15 Expressway.

Funing is famous for being a revolutionary area of the Chinese Communist Party.

It is also home to the Jiangsu Funing Economic Development Zone.

== Administrative divisions ==
At present, Funing County has 20 towns.

20 towns

- Fucheng (阜城镇)
- Goudun (沟墩镇)
- Wutan (吴滩镇)
- Heli (合利镇)
- Chenliang (陈良镇)
- Shizhuang (施庄镇)
- Sanzao (三灶镇)
- Guoshu (郭墅镇)
- Xingou (新沟镇)
- Chenji (陈集镇)
- Yangzhai (羊寨镇)
- Lupu (芦蒲镇)
- Shuoji (硕集镇)
- Banhu (板湖镇)
- Donggou (东沟镇)
- Yilin (益林镇)
- Gongxing (公兴镇)
- Yangji (杨集镇)
- Guhe (古河镇)
- Luoqiao (罗桥镇)

== Climate ==
Climate data for Funing, elevation 5 m (16 ft), (1991–2020 normals, extremes 1981–present)
Month	Jan	Feb	Mar	Apr	May	Jun	Jul	Aug	Sep	Oct	Nov	Dec	Year
Record high °C (°F)	19.2 (66.6)	25.2 (77.4)	32.0 (89.6)	32.3 (90.1)	35.6 (96.1)	37.2 (99.0)	38.9 (102.0)	38.3 (100.9)	35.3 (95.5)	31.3 (88.3)	28.0 (82.4)	20.0 (68.0)	38.9 (102.0)
Mean daily maximum °C (°F)	6.1 (43.0)	8.6 (47.5)	13.6 (56.5)	20.0 (68.0)	25.3 (77.5)	28.8 (83.8)	31.0 (87.8)	30.5 (86.9)	26.9 (80.4)	22.1 (71.8)	15.4 (59.7)	8.6 (47.5)	19.7 (67.5)
Daily mean °C (°F)	1.5 (34.7)	3.6 (38.5)	8.2 (46.8)	14.2 (57.6)	19.8 (67.6)	23.9 (75.0)	27.1 (80.8)	26.6 (79.9)	22.3 (72.1)	16.7 (62.1)	10.2 (50.4)	3.8 (38.8)	14.8 (58.7)
Mean daily minimum °C (°F)	−1.9 (28.6)	−0.1 (31.8)	3.9 (39.0)	9.4 (48.9)	15.1 (59.2)	20.0 (68.0)	24.2 (75.6)	23.7 (74.7)	18.9 (66.0)	12.6 (54.7)	6.3 (43.3)	0.2 (32.4)	11.0 (51.9)
Record low °C (°F)	−11.8 (10.8)	−12.7 (9.1)	−7.8 (18.0)	−1.1 (30.0)	4.8 (40.6)	12.0 (53.6)	17.8 (64.0)	16.0 (60.8)	9.9 (49.8)	1.2 (34.2)	−6.0 (21.2)	−11.5 (11.3)	−12.7 (9.1)
Average precipitation mm (inches)	25.3 (1.00)	29.9 (1.18)	45.0 (1.77)	46.5 (1.83)	69.4 (2.73)	134.1 (5.28)	206.0 (8.11)	197.4 (7.77)	82.0 (3.23)	42.9 (1.69)	45.3 (1.78)	24.4 (0.96)	948.2 (37.33)
Average precipitation days (≥ 0.1 mm)	5.4	6.7	7.5	7.2	9.1	9.0	12.7	12.1	8.3	6.6	6.7	5.0	96.3
Average snowy days	2.4	2.2	0.8	0	0	0	0	0	0	0	0.5	0.8	6.7
Average relative humidity (%)	72	72	71	70	73	77	83	85	82	76	75	72	76
Mean monthly sunshine hours	146.1	145.9	179.1	200.5	207.5	170.2	168.1	183.4	175.6	179.7	152.5	151.2	2,059.8
Percentage possible sunshine	46	47	48	51	48	40	39	45	48	52	49	49	47
Source: China Meteorological Administration all-time extreme temperature

== See also ==
- Funing big cake
