= Pesaha appam =

Indian rice cake

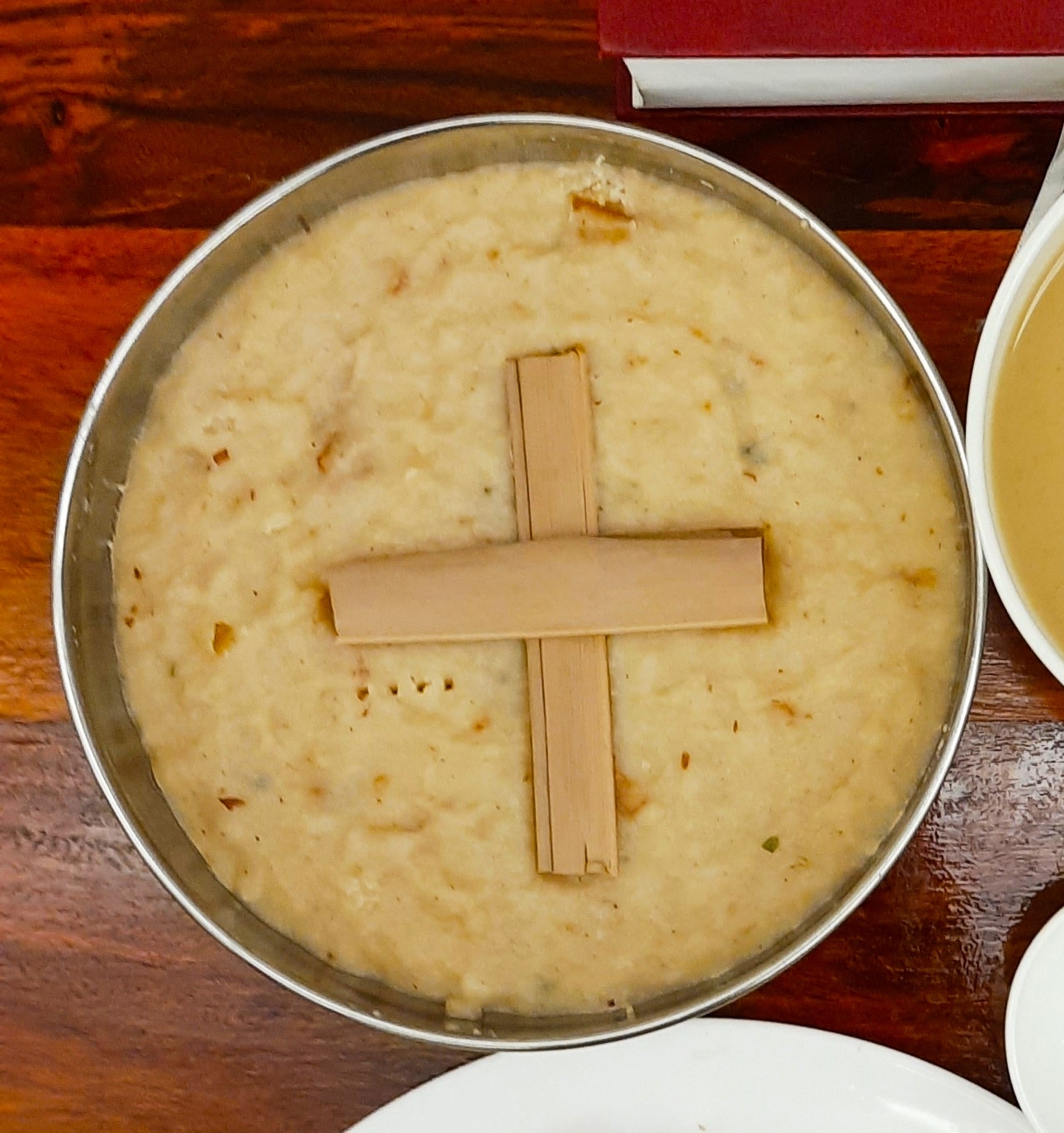
- Pesaha appam and Pesaha milk made during Holy Week by Christians of Kerala, India.
- Alternative names: Kurishappam
- Serving temperature: Dinner
- Main ingredients: Rice batter
- Variations: Palappam (fermented bread for festivities and other days)
- Other information: Cultural cuisine of the Nasrani

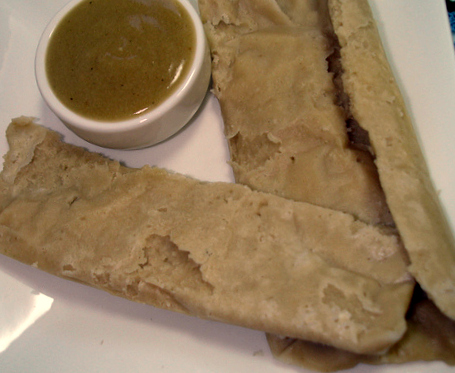
Pesaha Appam of another variant.

Pesaha appam or Kurisappam is a firm rice cake made by the Christians of Kerala, India, to be served on the night of Maundy Thursday (Pesaha). It is made from rice batter like palappam, but is not fermented with yeast in its preparation. A cross is made using the palm leaves from Palm Sunday, and placed in the middle of the batter.

== Background ==
The Pesaha celebration of Christians falls on Western Maundy Thursday and lasts for a single day. Traditionally, Pesaha appam is served in a ceremonial manner at night in Christian households across Kerala. The senior male of the family cuts the appam, dips it in paalukurukku (syrup) or Pesaha pal (coconut milk), and serves it to the other family members. The brown paalukurukku is made mainly using jaggery and coconut milk. The meal also includes small banana variants in Kerala such as poovan pazham or njalipoovan pazham. Some families have the custom of singing traditional Kerala Nasrani Christian songs during this meal.

The Pesaha appam is said to have been derived from traditional Jewish matza. Like matzo, it is prepared without yeast.

== Name ==
The cake is also called Indri appam or INRI appam, after INRI, the initials of the Latin inscription Iesus Nazarenus Rex Iudaeorum ("Jesus of Nazareth, King of the Jews") that the Gospels place on the cross of Jesus. Being unleavened, it echoes the unleavened bread of the Jewish Passover, which the Book of Exodus links to the Israelites leaving Egypt in haste, with no time for their dough to rise.

== See also ==
- List of Indian breads
