= Fitzbillies =

Bakery in Cambridge, England

Coordinates: 52°12′07″N 0°07′05″E

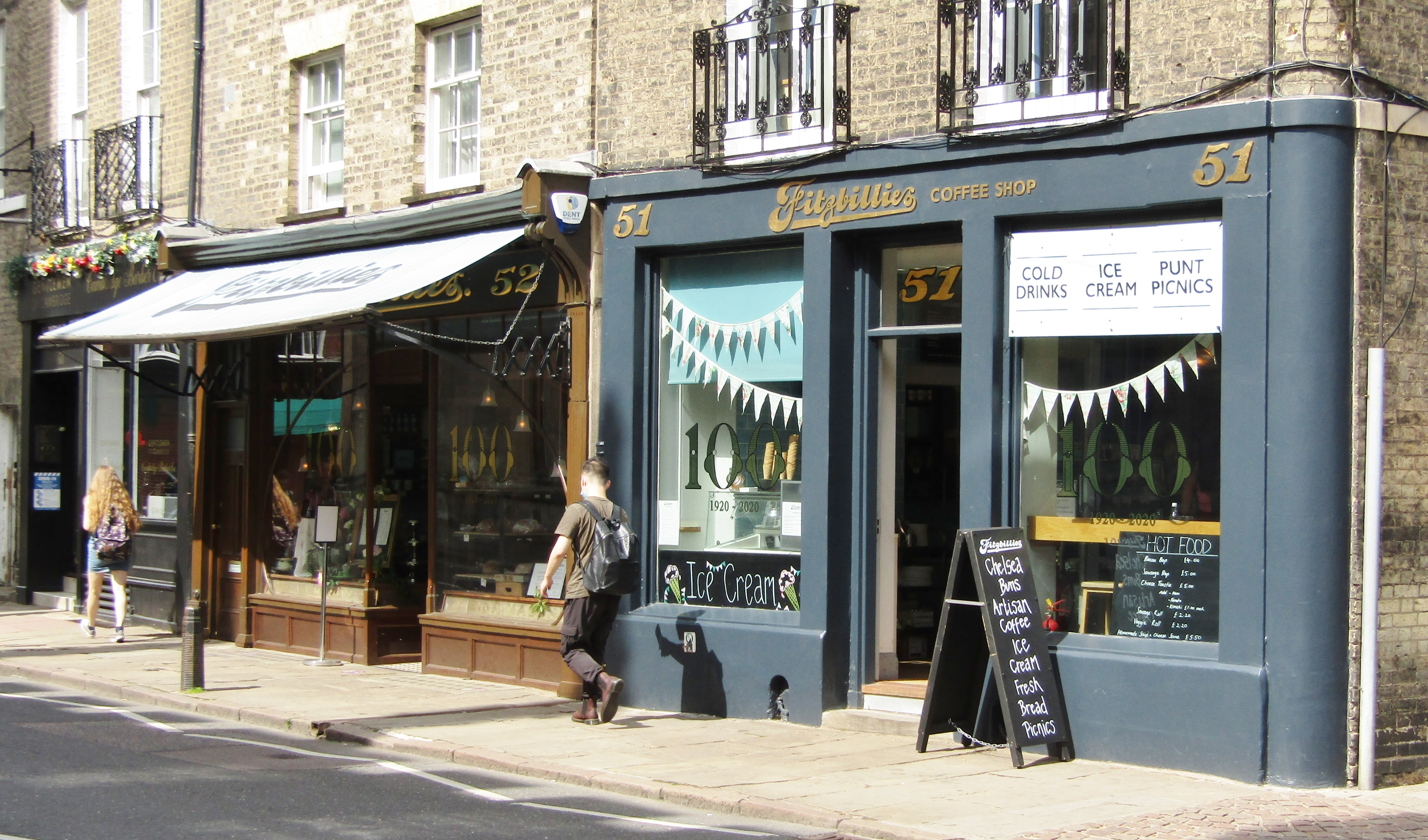
Fitzbillies on Trumpington Street, Cambridge

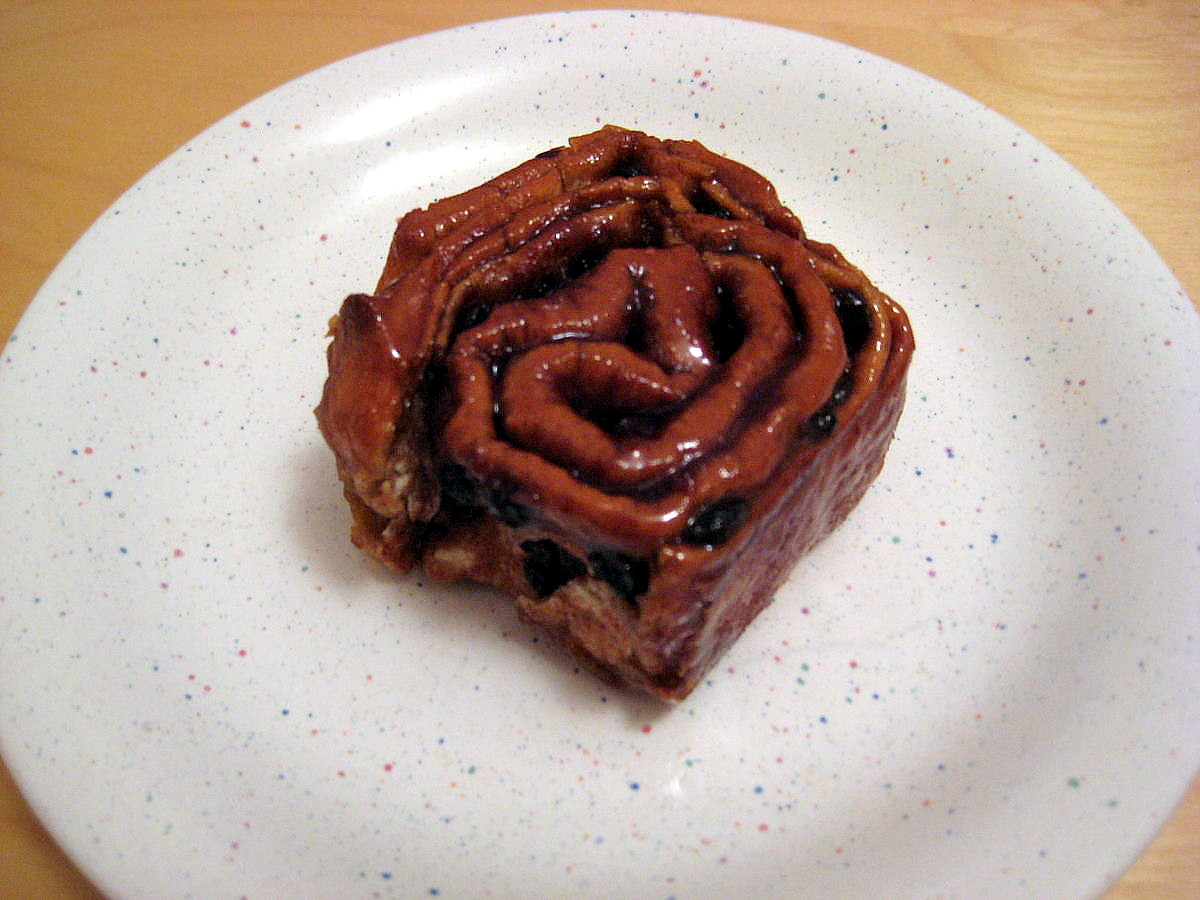
A Chelsea bun at Fitzbillies

Fitzbillies is a small chain of three bakery-cafes in Cambridge, England. The company is known for its Chelsea buns.

It was founded in November 1920 as an independent bakery on Trumpington Street, Cambridge, taking its name from its location near Fitzwilliam Museum.

Fitzbillies suffered from two bankruptcies, in 1980 and 2011, but in both cases recovered from the bankruptcy and resumed business. A fire in 1998 saw the bakery partially closed for two years.

Following the 2011 bankruptcy, a public appeal by broadcaster and Cambridge alumnus Stephen Fry encouraged restaurateur Tim Hayward to buy Fitzbillies and reopen it. Later Fitzbillies expanded to three locations, including Bridge Street (open 2016) and King's Parade (open 2023).
