= Couque suisse =

Belgian sweet pastry

- Type: Sweet roll
- Place of origin: Belgium

A couque suisse is a Belgian viennoiserie. It is a sweet roll, somewhat similar to a Danish pastry. Couques suisses are available internationally. They are also similar to Belgian buns.

They have been common street food for Belgium's white collar workers since 1900, mostly consumed as a lunchtime snack, either on the street or at no-frills pubs.
