= Chelsea bun =

English type of spiced bun

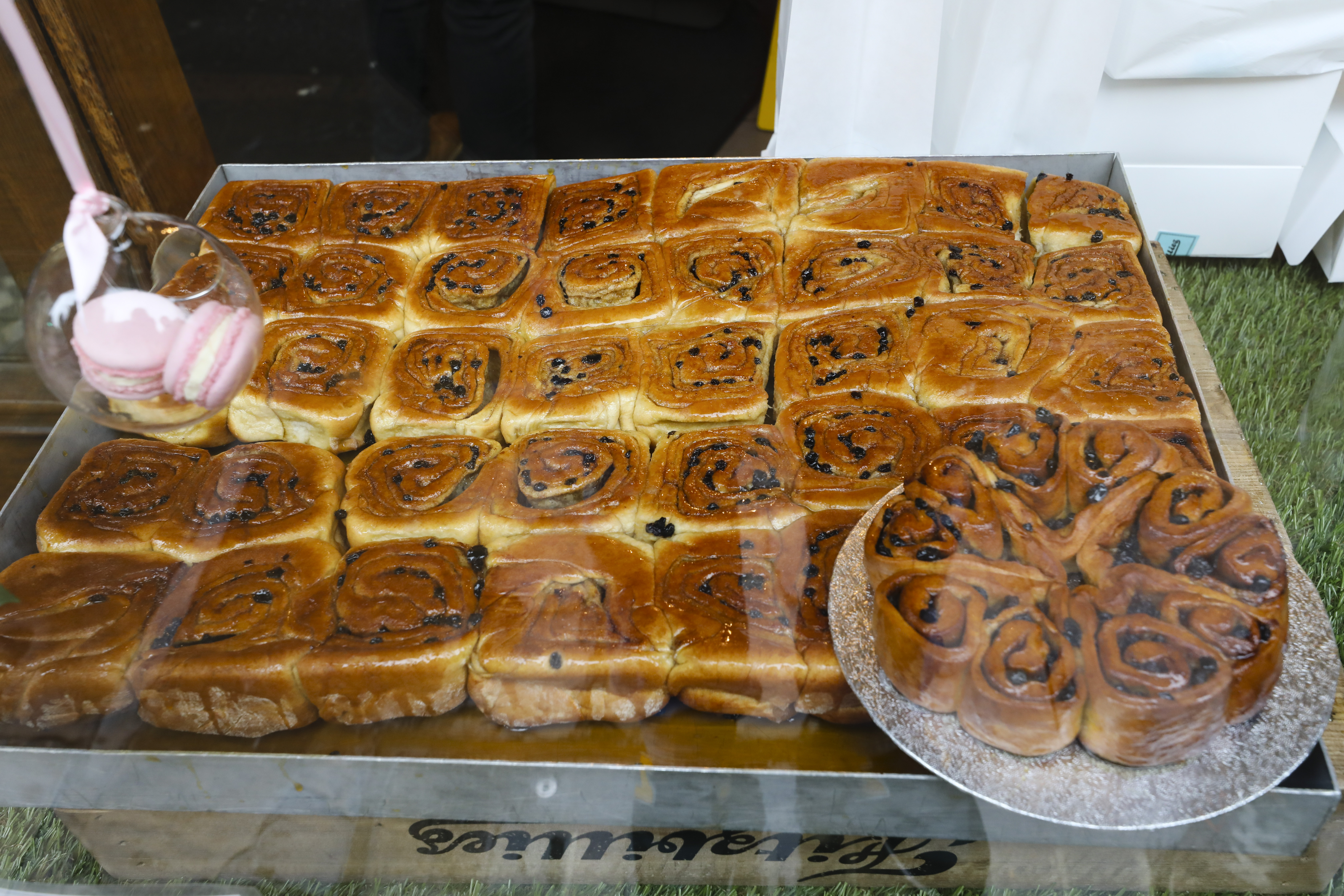
- A tray of Chelsea buns at Fitzbillies in Cambridge
- Type: Spiced bun
- Place of origin: United Kingdom
- Region or state: Chelsea
- Created by: Bun House
- Main ingredients: Yeast dough, lemon zest, cinnamon or other spices

The Chelsea bun is a type of spiced bun that was first baked in the 18th century at the Bun House in Chelsea, London, an establishment favoured by Hanoverian royalty accustomed to similar pastries in their native cuisine. The shop was demolished in 1839.

The bun is made of a rich yeast dough flavoured with lemon peel, cinnamon or mixed spice. The dough is rolled out, spread with a mixture of currants, brown sugar and butter, then formed into a square-sided log. The process of making this bun is very similar to that involved in producing the cinnamon roll. After being baked, traditionally the chelsea bun is glazed with syrup (or cold water and sugar). It is glazed while still hot so that the water evaporates and leaves a sticky sugar coating. Commercially made buns are sometimes topped with glace icing.

The oldest known reference to Chelsea buns was in 1711 by Jonathan Swift, but it is unclear whether the bun resembled the modern form of Chelsea bun or if it was a hot cross bun.

== See also ==
- List of British breads
- List of buns
- List of sweet breads
- Mohnstrudel, a similar European bread filled with poppy seeds or chopped nuts.
- Belgian bun, a similar British cake but covered in icing.
