= Fruit bun =

Sweet bread with fruit and spices

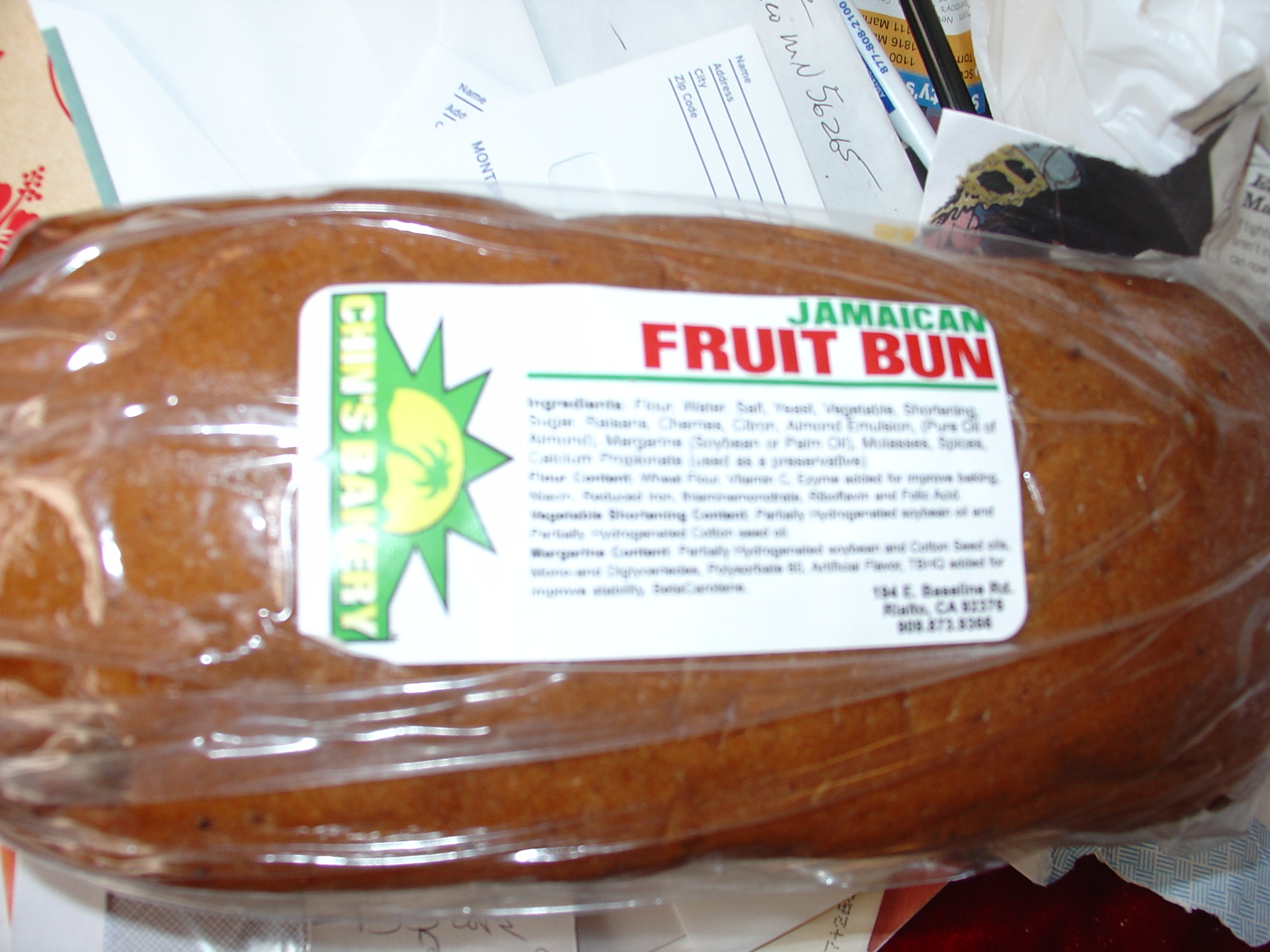
- A Jamaican fruit bun loaf of bread
- Type: Sweet roll
- Main ingredients: Fruit, fruit peel, spices; sometimes nuts
- Variations: Currant bun

Fruit buns are a type of sweet roll made with fruit, fruit peel, spices and sometimes nuts. They are a tradition in Britain and former British colonies including Jamaica, Australia, Singapore and India. They are made with fruit and fruit peel and are similar to Bath buns, which are sprinkled and cooked with sugar nibs. One variety is a currant bun.

== See also ==
- Hot cross bun
- Bath bun
- Sally Lunn bun
- Fruitcake
- List of buns
