= Funing big cake =

Type of cake found in Funing County, China

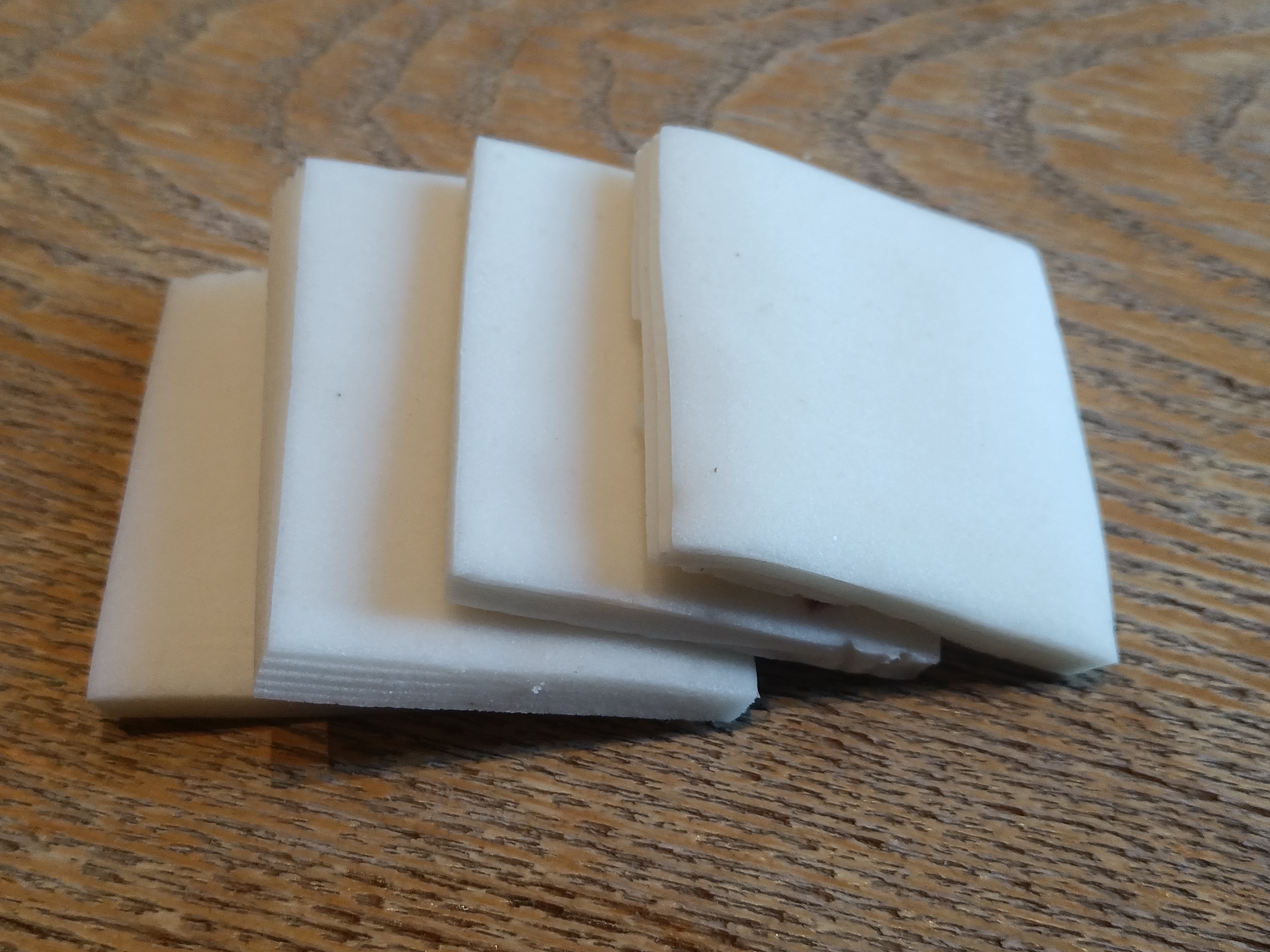
- Alternative names: Jade belt cake
- Type: Cake
- Place of origin: China
- Region or state: Funing County, Jiangsu province
- Main ingredients: sticky rice, refined lard or vegetable oil

Funing big cake
- Chinese: 阜宁大糕
Transcriptions

Funing big cake (Chinese: 阜宁大糕; pinyin: fù níng dà gāo) is a type of cake made from rice, found in Funing County in the Jiangsu province of China. It can be served as a tea cake or it can be fried.

== History ==
Funing big cake can be dated to 2,000 years ago. It is also known as jade belt cake. Each name has its own myth. One version is that this name is given by the Qianlong Emperor. After eating one slice, the emperor spoke highly of it and gave it this name. However, another version also spread widely. Many years ago, local officials took it as a tribute delivering it to the palace. Someone was promoted due to this and got a jade belt as an award. As a result, its name of jade belt cake became widely used.

== Ingredients ==
Its raw materials are traditionally sticky rice, white sugar and refined lard. Due to health concerns associated with lard consumption, sometimes vegetable oil is used instead of lard. Sometimes the cake also contains pine nuts, juglandis (walnuts), or other ingredients as garnishes.

== See also ==
- List of cakes
- List of Chinese desserts
- List of desserts
