= Sticky bun =

Type of dessert or breakfast sweet roll

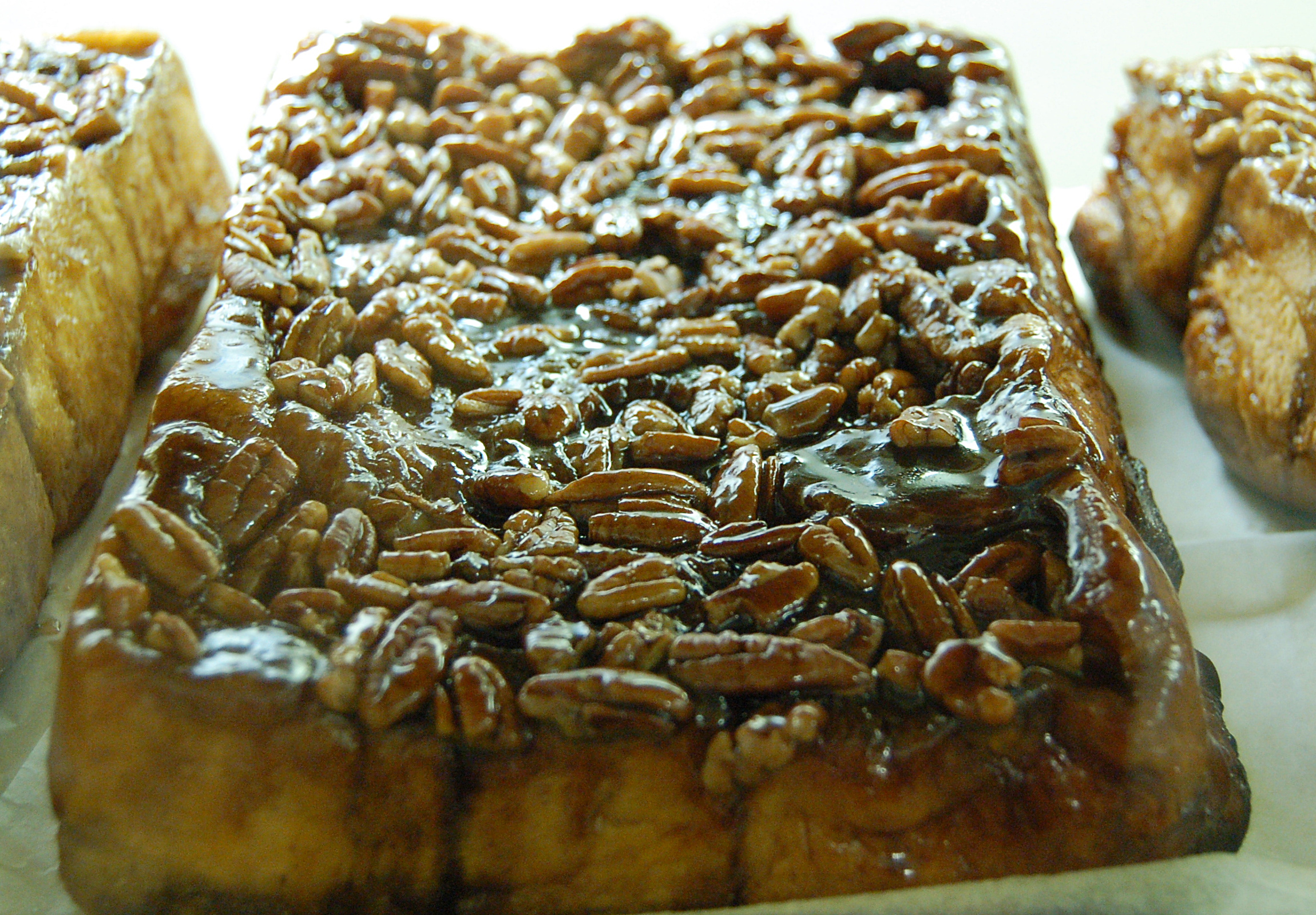
- A traditional sticky bun loaf
- Type: Sweet roll
- Main ingredients: Dough, brown sugar, honey

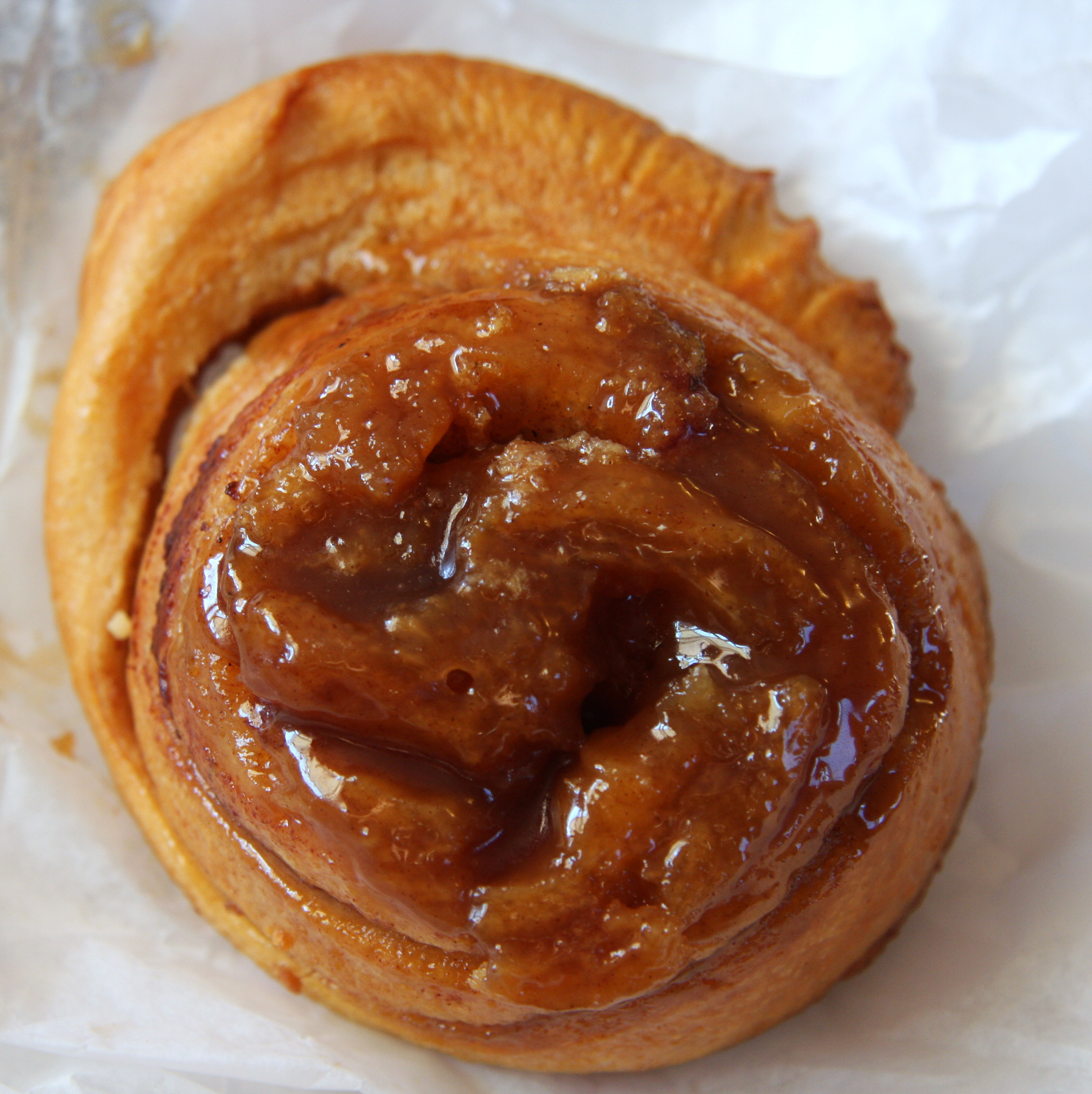
A caramel roll

Sticky buns are a type of dessert or breakfast sweet roll that generally consist of rolled pieces of leavened dough — sometimes containing brown sugar or cinnamon — compressed together to form a kind of flat loaf corresponding to the size of the pan in which they are to be baked. Before the dough is placed in the baking-pan, the latter is lined with the "sticky" ingredients, such as brown sugar or honey (or both), as well as nuts and raisins and perhaps more sugar and sometimes butter. After the buns are baked, they are inverted so that the pan lining then becomes a topping. Commercially produced sticky buns, however, are usually just baked in an aluminum loaf tin, which allows the topping to suffuse the buns, making them sticky throughout. The way the buns were baked allows them to more or less be pulled off as individual servings, although it is often a futile effort.

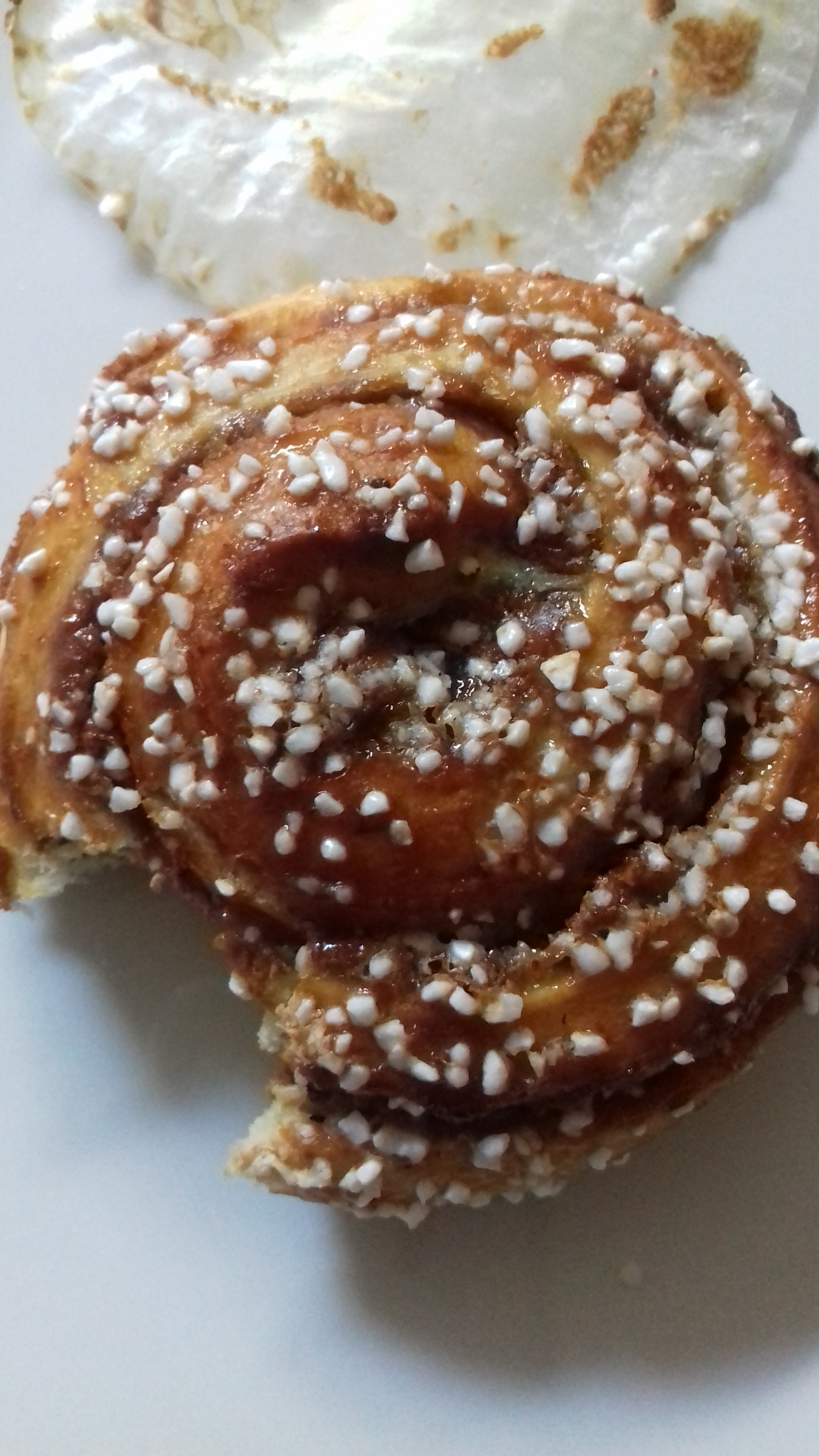
Swedish cinnamon bun

Sticky buns have been consumed since the Middle Ages, at which time cinnamon became more prominent.

Sticky buns also have a Germanic origin and were originally known as "Schnecken". The Pennsylvania Dutch introduced Schnecken in the United States. Wherever 18th-century German settlers (such as the Pennsylvania Dutch) went, sticky buns have remained long after many other cultural traits have disappeared.

In Venezuela, there is a very similar local version of them called golfeado. The main difference between them is the ground fresh cheese on top that gives the bun a very particular sweet-salty taste.

== See also ==
- Bun
- Cinnamon roll
- Belgian bun
- Iced bun
- List of buns
- List of sweet breads
- Monkey bread
