= Manchet =

Variety of white bread

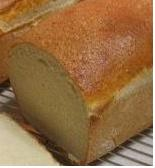
- Manchet loaf
- Type: bread
- Place of origin: Britain
- Region or state: France
- Main ingredients: flour
- Variations: Bath bun, Sally Lunn bun

Manchet, manchette or michette is a wheaten, yeast-leavened bread of very good quality, or a small flat circular loaf. It is a bread that was small enough to be held in the hand.

== History ==
The Oxford English Dictionary traces the use of the English word manchet back to about 1450 and equates this type of bread with paindemain.

One of the first recipes printed in English for manchet bread comes from the 1588 recipe book The Good Huswifes Handmaide by an unknown author. In it the author explains that the flour must be fine and have been boulted twice.

Florence White's classic English cuisine book Good Things in England, first published in 1932, contains several recipes for manchets. White gives five regional varieties of the bread and quotes from sources for the recipes. The first is from Gervase Markham in Nottinghamshire published in 1615 where White quotes an anonymous source that describes a manchet as 'Your best and principal bread'. Gervase Markham writes that the dough should be kneaded by hand and with the brake, and if no brake is available, wrapped in a cloth and trodden underfoot.

The Eltham Ordinance, a suggestion for the allowances of food at the Tudor court of Henry VIII and Catherine of Aragon, lists manchets for the "Queen's Maides" and other members of the royal household. This may suggest that in origin manchet was a luxurious bread containing ingredients that were available only to the wealthy. During the reign of Elizabeth I (r. 1558–1603) the most superior wheat for a manchet allegedly came from Heston, near Hounslow .

Breakfast in the household of Henry Percy, 9th Earl of Northumberland for the earl and his lady on a flesh day, according to the household accounts from 1564 to 1632, was "a loofe of bred in trenchors, 2 manchets, 1 quart bere, 1 quart wyne, a Chyne of Muton or Chyne of Beef Boilid". The two older sons had "2 loaf of household Breid, a Manchet, 1 Potell [two quarts] of Bere, a Chekynge [chicken] or ells 3 mutton Bonys boyled".

Florence White makes reference to three contemporary versions: the Cornish manchet, a version from the Isle of Wight, and a recipe from Sussex for "Lady Arundel's Manchet" which is notable for the inclusion of butter, eggs, and milk. The recipe for Lady Arundel's manchet was first published in 1653 in A True Gentlewoman's Delight, printed for the Countess of Kent.

Manchets crossed the Atlantic to Virginia with the early colonists. Manchets are little made today, with the traditional Bath bun and Sally Lunn bun amongst the best-known contemporary styles still made commercially. According to Elizabeth David, only the wealthy could have manchets for their breakfast or dinner, and these became the "ancestors" of eighteenth-century French rolls.

== In popular culture ==
In series 3 of the television series The Great British Bake-off, Cathryn Dresser from Sussex made Lady Arundel's manchets, serving them with an inner layer of cream and jam.

== See also ==
- List of British breads
- List of sweet breads
