= Hot cross bun =

Baked item for Easter

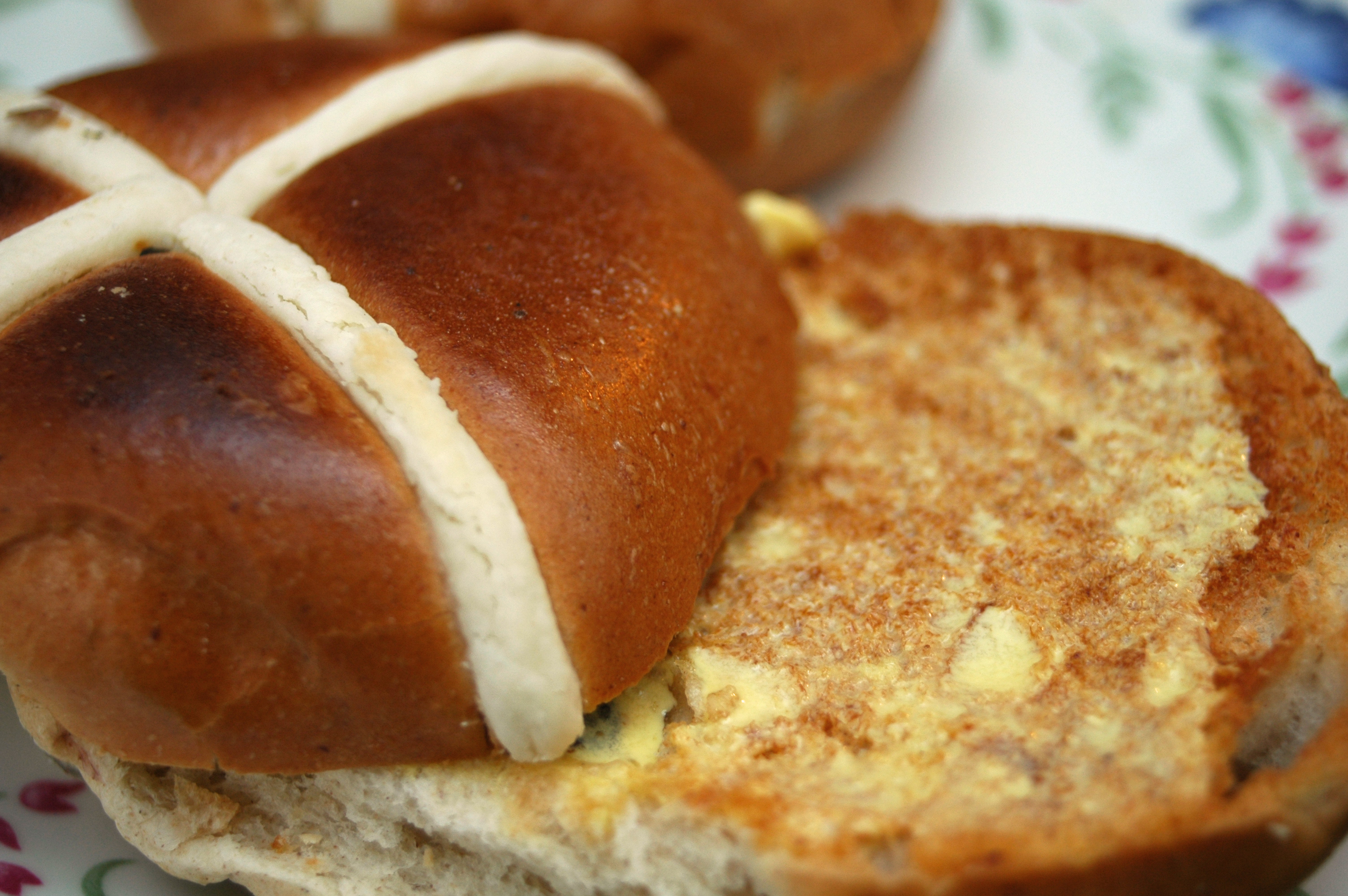
- Hot cross bun, with a piped cross made from flour paste, cut in two and toasted
- Type: Spiced bun
- Place of origin: England
- Main ingredients: Wheat flour, currants or raisins with spices

A hot cross bun is a spiced bun, usually containing small pieces of raisins and marked with a cross on the top, traditionally eaten on Good Friday in the United Kingdom and other Commonwealth countries. Hot Cross Bun Day is the 11th of September. They are available all year round in some countries, including the UK.

The bun marks the end of the season of Lent. Further, the different elements of the hot cross bun each have a specific meaning, such as the cross representing the crucifixion of Jesus and the spices inside signifying the spices used to embalm him.

== History ==
In the Christian tradition, buns with a cross on them are made and consumed after breaking the fast on Good Friday, along with "crying about 'Hot cross buns'", in order to commemorate the crucifixion of Jesus.

In 1592, during the reign of Elizabeth I of England, the London Clerk of Markets issued a decree forbidding the sale of spiced buns and other spiced breads except at burials, on Good Friday, or at Christmas. The punishment for transgressing the decree was forfeiture of all the forbidden product to the poor. As a result, hot cross buns at the time were primarily made in domestic kitchens. Further attempts to suppress the sale of these items outside of these holy days took place during the reign of James I of England (1603–1625).

The first definite record of hot cross buns comes from a London street cry: "Good Friday comes this month, the old woman runs. With one or two a penny hot cross buns", which appeared in Poor Robin's Almanac for 1733. The line "One a penny, two a penny, hot cross-buns" appears in the English nursery rhyme "Hot Cross Buns" published in the London Chronicle for 2–4 June 1767. Food historian Ivan Day states, "The buns were made in London during the 18th century. But when you start looking for records or recipes earlier than that, you hit nothing."

== Traditions ==
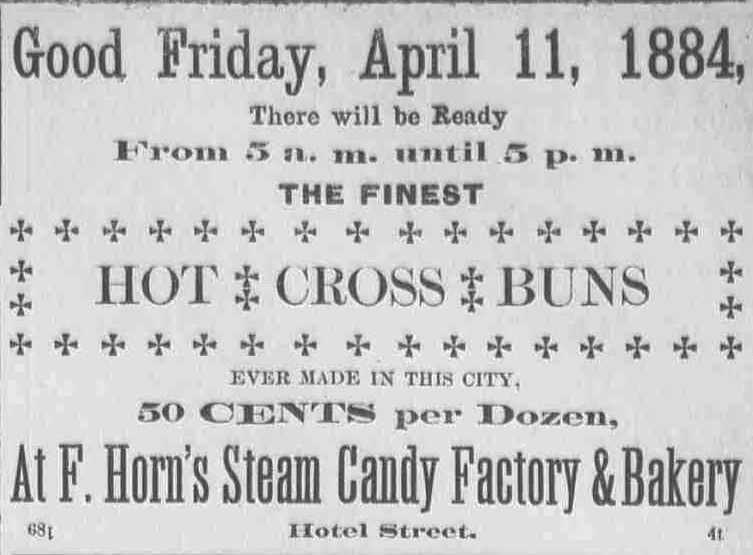
An 1884 advertisement announcing the sale of hot cross buns for Good Friday in a Hawaiian newspaper.

English folklore includes many superstitions surrounding hot cross buns. One is that if the bun was made from dough kneaded for the host and baked and served on Good Friday, it would not spoil or grow mouldy during the subsequent year. Much the same was claimed for sacrificial bread in Classical times before Christianity. Another belief encourages keeping such a bun for medicinal purposes. A piece of it given to someone who is ill is said to help them recover.

If taken on a sea voyage, hot cross buns are said to protect against shipwreck. If hung in the kitchen, they are said to protect against fire and ensure that all breads turn out perfectly. The hanging bun is replaced each year.

== Other versions ==
In the United Kingdom, the major supermarkets produce variations on the traditional recipe such as toffee, orange-cranberry, salted caramel and chocolate, and apple-cinnamon.

In Australia, recent variations of the hot cross bun by major supermarkets have included chocolate chip, sour cherry, burger sauce, Iced VoVo, Pizza Shapes, Vegemite and cheese, jalapeño and cheese, and others.

In Jamaica and some Commonwealth Caribbean islands, the hot cross bun has over time evolved into a spiced Easter bun with the addition of molasses, spices and a loaf shape. This bun is eaten with cheese in islands such as Jamaica and Guyana and served with beverages such as mauby or ginger beer.

In Slovakia and in the Czech Republic, mazanec is a similar cake or sweet bread eaten at Easter. It often has a cross marked on top.

== The cross ==
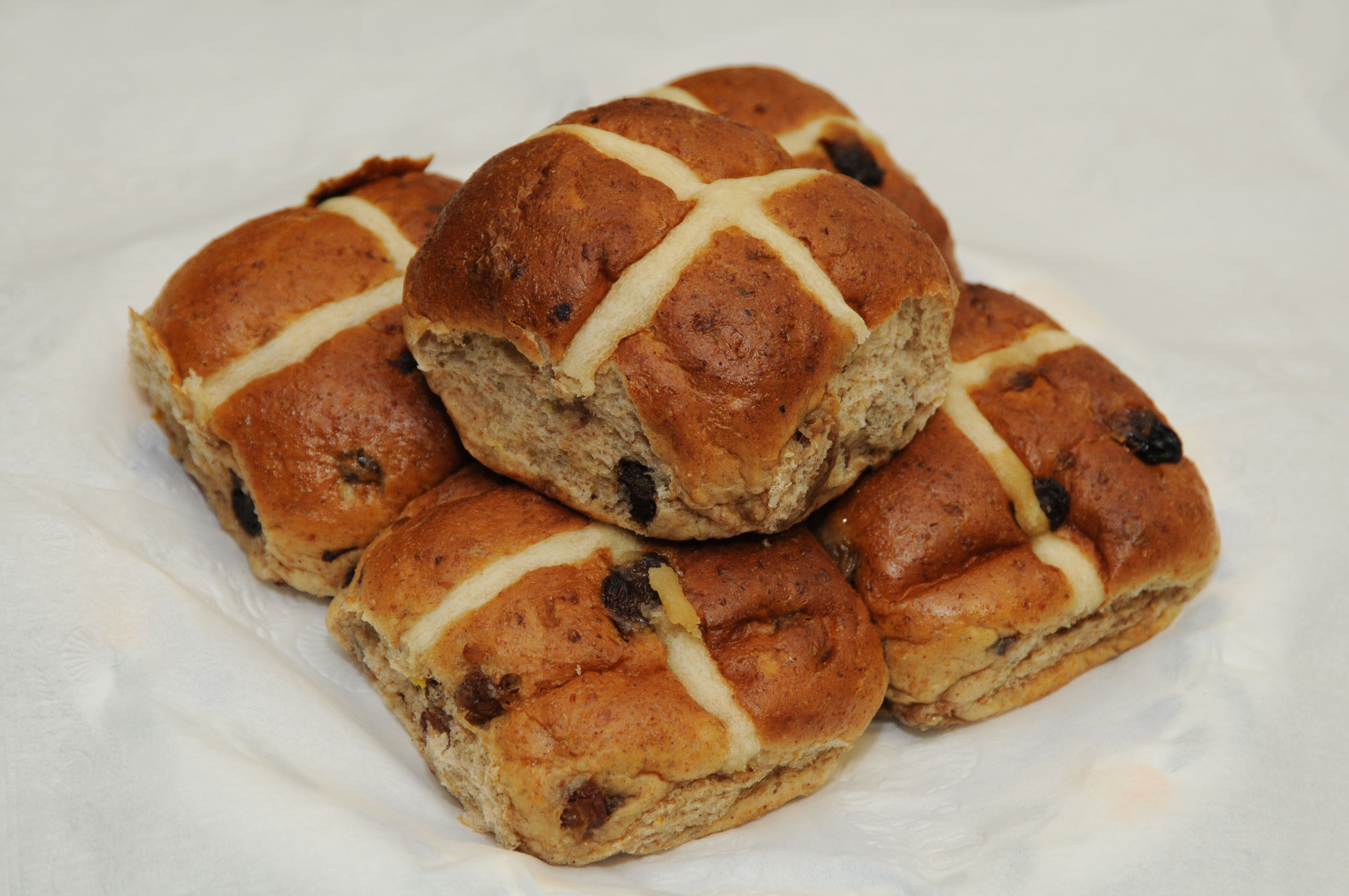
Five hot cross buns

The traditional method for making the cross on top of the bun is to use shortcrust pastry, though some 21st century recipes recommended a paste of flour and water.

== See also ==
- Pesaha appam – Indian rice cake
- Bath bun – Sweet bun topped with crushed sugar
- Fruit bun – Sweet bread with fruit and spices
- Sally Lunn bun – English sweet bun
- List of British breads
- List of bread rolls
- List of foods with religious symbolism
- Semla – Nordic filled breads
