= Spiced bun =

Sweet bun with spices

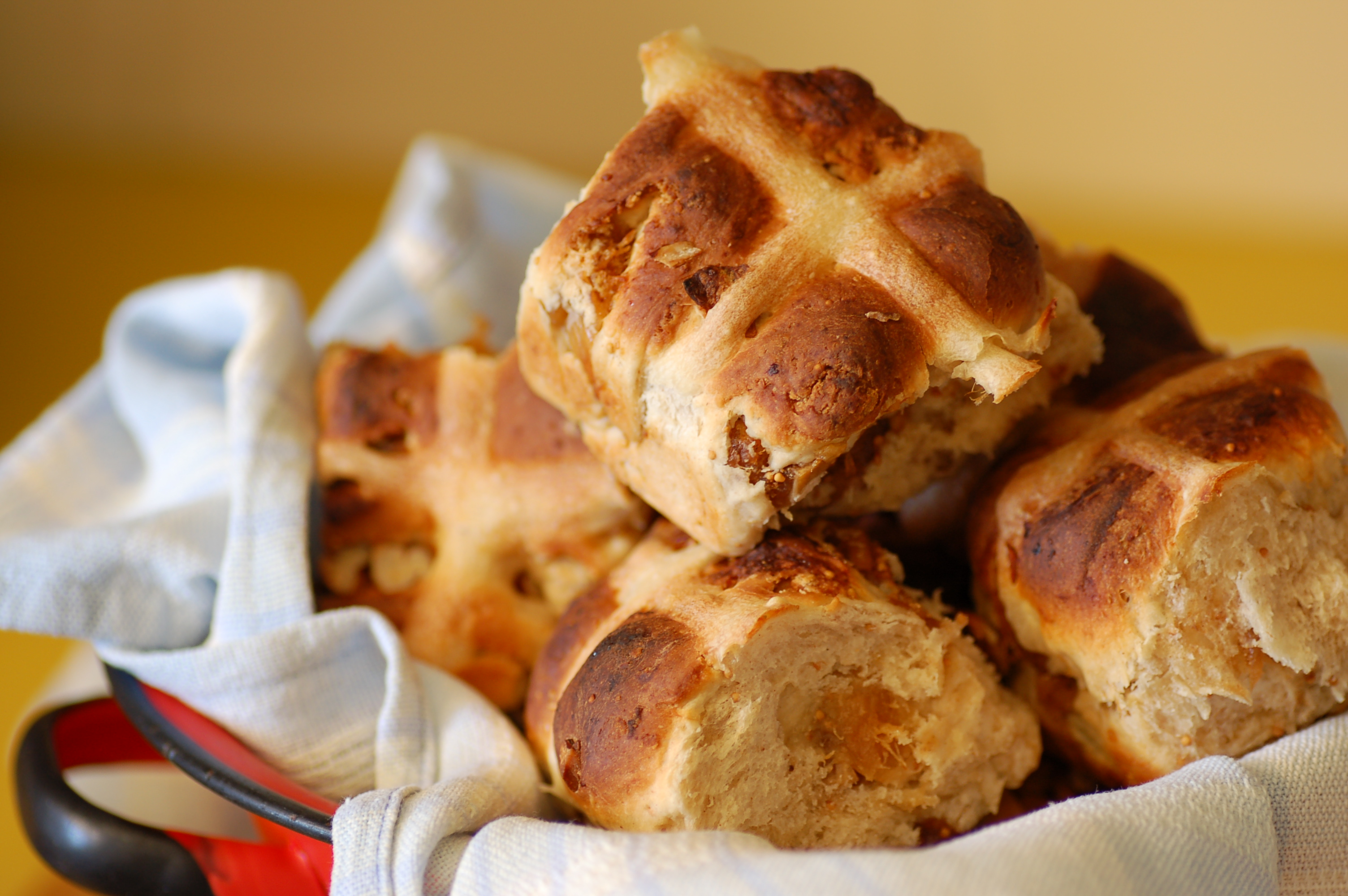
- Hot cross buns, one type of spiced bun
- Type: Sweet roll
- Main ingredients: Sweet roll, spices

A spiced bun is a sweet bun to which spices were added during the baking process. Common examples are the hot cross bun and the Jamaican spiced bun.

== Common spices ==
Spices used in the preparation of spiced buns include:

- cinnamon
- mace
- nutmeg
- coriander
- allspice
- saffron
- mixed spice - a non-standardised mixture of spices used in the preparation of many spicy foods.

== Types ==
Many local forms of the spiced bun exist, an example of which is the Cornish saffron bun.

The hot cross bun is probably the most well-known manifestation of the spiced bun, and a great tradition has grown up around it in England. Hot cross buns are traditionally baked on Good Friday, although they can often be purchased at other times of year. In Australia and New Zealand, the Boston bun is a larger variety of the spiced bun, topped with coconut icing.

The Jamaican spiced bun is shaped like a loaf of bread and is a dark brown colour. It is commonly eaten with cheese and is also eaten with butter or alone with a glass of milk. It is also popular in other Caribbean nations.

Bon bread, also called pambón or black bread, is a traditional bread from the Afro-Anglo-Saxon Caribbean, typical of the Caribbean coast of Nicaragua, Costa Rica and Panama, and the Colombian archipelago of San Andrés and Providencia. It is a dark spiced bread, derived from gingerbread of English origin. Bread bon derives from bun, a type of English bun characterized by its dark color, due to the addition of ginger. The origin of this bread can be traced back to the Middle Ages. During Elizabethan times, buns made with spices and eggs were cooked, to which, during Lent, raisins and corintas were added. After the Lutheran Reformation, this bread was consumed on Good Friday, with the custom of marking it with a cross before putting it in the oven, as a way to ward off evil spirits. In the 17th century, it became popular as a breakfast.

The English gingerbread recipe was learned by African slaves when they were brought by the British to the West Indies. In the Caribbean islands, ginger was replaced by sugar cane molasses, due to the abundance of sugar plantations. This molasses is what gives it the dark color.

== See also ==
- List of buns
