= Belgian bun =

Sweet bun with sultanas, topped with icing and half a glace cherry

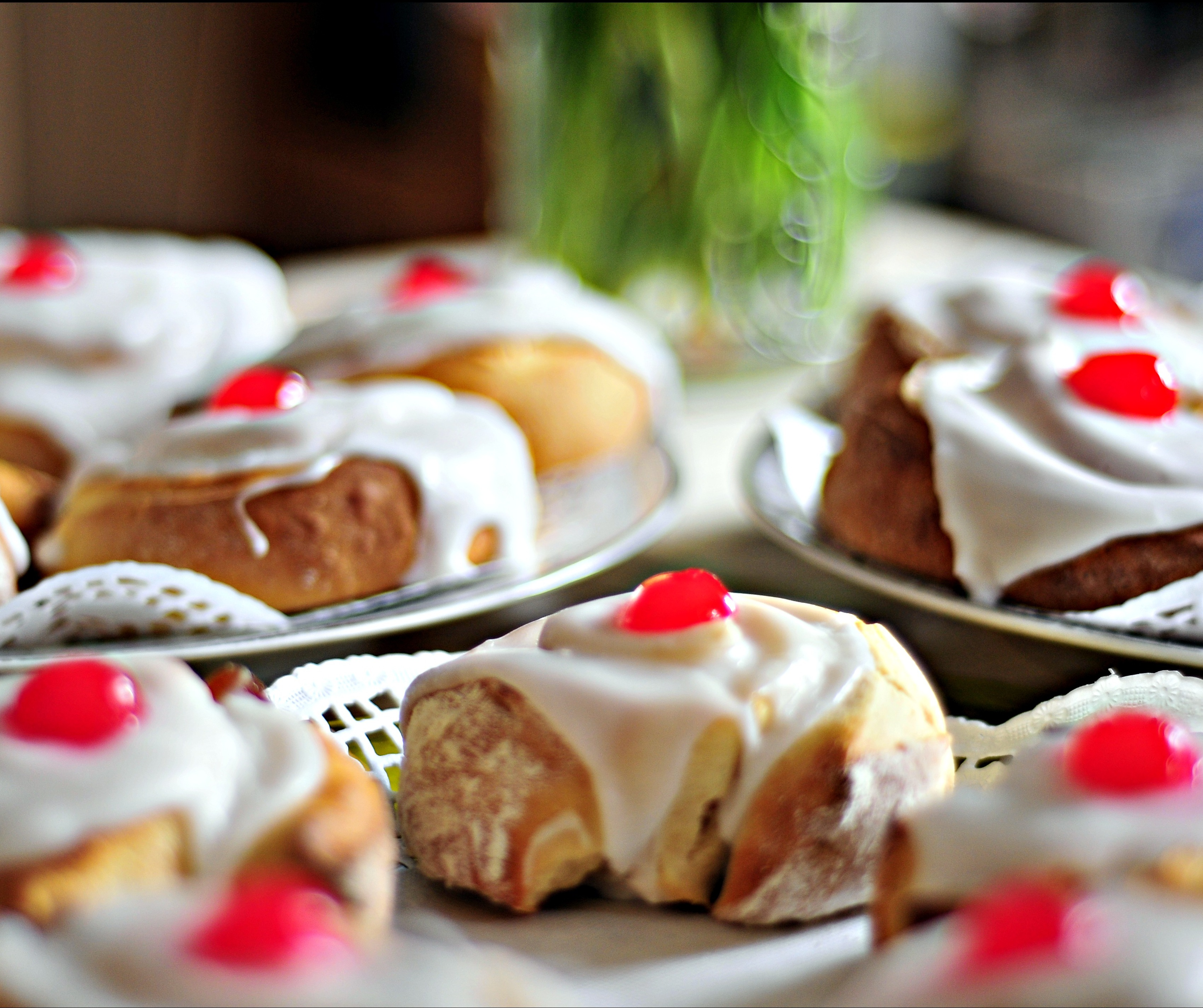
- Type: Sweet roll
- Place of origin: United Kingdom
- Main ingredients: sultanas, icing

A Belgian bun is a sweet bun containing sultanas and usually topped with glace icing and half a glace cherry. Some recipes also include lemon curd. There is no fixed recipe, and many bakeries use their own recipes.

The bun is round or square shaped, with rounded off edges, making it similar in appearance to a Chelsea bun. It is also sometimes served with cream.

No firm link has so far been established between the bun and Belgium; however, that country does produce as one of its specialties a very similar viennoiserie (though with less icing) known as a rozijnenkoek or couque suisse.

The world's biggest Belgian bun was made in 2018, to celebrate a new route to Antwerp from London Southend Airport, and weighed 17.1 kg (38 lb).

== See also ==
- List of buns
