= Saint Thomas Christian music =

Saint Thomas Christian music refers to the musical traditions of the Saint Thomas Christian community of Kerala, India. It is chiefly liturgical and is derived from ancient Syriac Christian music from the Middle East, with remarkably little influence from local Indian styles. Of particular significance is the prevalence of the organum singing style. As a result of the community's isolation and conservatism, these traditions may retain elements of the earliest forms of Early Christian music.

== History ==
The Saint Thomas Christians trace their origins to the evangelical activity of Thomas the Apostle in the 1st century. The community grew under the influence of migration from Syrians, members of the Church of the East. The community's modern musical traditions may be derived from this connection. Into the 20th century, Saint Thomas Christian liturgy was performed and sung in the Syriac language, though today this largely has been replaced with the local language, Malayalam. Due to the community's resistance to outside influence and isolation, the music of the Saint Thomas Christians may preserve elements of the earliest forms of Christian music.

Scholar Israel J. Ross compares Saint Thomas Christian music to that of the Jews in Kerala. Jewish music influenced the early Christian music ancestral to the Saint Thomas Christian forms, and Jews have lived in similar conditions to the Thomas Christians in Kerala for centuries. As such, Christian and Jewish music and culture in Kerala feature many parallels and similarities. For example, a Saint Thomas Christian blessing given by a dying father to his children is similar to the Jewish Amidah. These similarities may reflect a common origin in the ancient Middle East.

The Saint Thomas Christian father's blessing, as compared to the Jewish Amidah
Saint Thomas Christian blessing	Amidah
God gave his blessing to Abraham, Abraham gave that blessing to Isaac, Isaac gave that blessing to Jacob, Jacob ...to my forefathers, My forefathers...my parents, And my parents...to me, Now, dear son (daughter), I give that blessing to you.	Blessed art Thou, O Lord our God, and God of our fathers, God of Abraham, God of Isaac, and God of Jacob, the great, mighty and revered God...
Ross 1979

== Structure ==
Saint Thomas Christian music derives from archaic Syriac forms, with little discernible influence from Indian classical music or other local traditions. Liturgical music is performed in two modes: kadmoyo and hamisoyo. These are similar to the Arabic maqamat and may be derived from an ancient Syriac system that existed in the Middle East in the early centuries of Christianity, and which may be related to the system known as oktoechos. Intonation is similar to the Syriac standard, featuring no augmented second or microtonal alteration characteristic of Indian music.

The organum singing style is common in Saint Thomas Christian music. It appears in antiphons, responsories, and hymns. Ross notes that this is found among three other disparate and isolated cultures: the nearby Cochin Jews, the Yemenite Jews, and the Samaritans. Organum may be sung in either duplum or triplum. In the former it is sung in the fifth when the boys and men sing together with the cantus firmus in the upper voice, or in the fourth when the groups sing alone. In triplum it is sung in the fourth and octave.

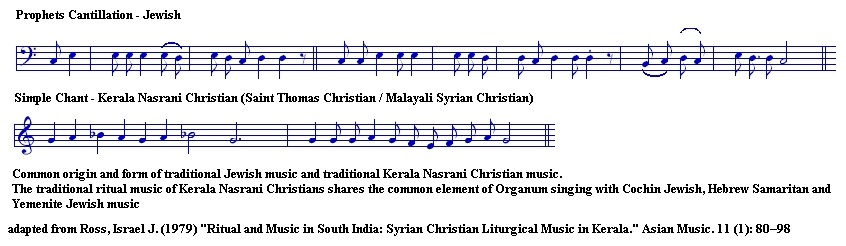

The Margam Kali is a traditional Saint Thomas Christian dance. The accompanying music is performed by a choir singing in Syriac chant, with a sleeyankolu (triangle) maintaining rhythm. Another traditional instrument is the violin or revekka.

== Chant accentuation ==
Traditional chant accentuation derives from the Syriac standard, which was instituted by the scholars known as the Masoretes in the Middle Ages. The form is similar to that codified by the Hebrew grammarians of Tiberias for Jewish cantillation of the Bible. It features dot notation above, below, and to the side of words in the text. The names of the notations are expressive, reflecting the style of Syriac Bible reading and chant in general.

== Thoma Parvam ==
One important Saint Thomas Christian song is the "Thoma Parvam", or "Song of Thomas". The song contains a colophon claiming it was first written in 1601 by a certain Maliekel Thoma Ramban, though the manuscripts are of a much later date. The words give an account of Thomas the Apostle's purported evangelical work in India in the 1st century.
