= Sweet roll =

Baked yeast-leavened dessert or breakfast

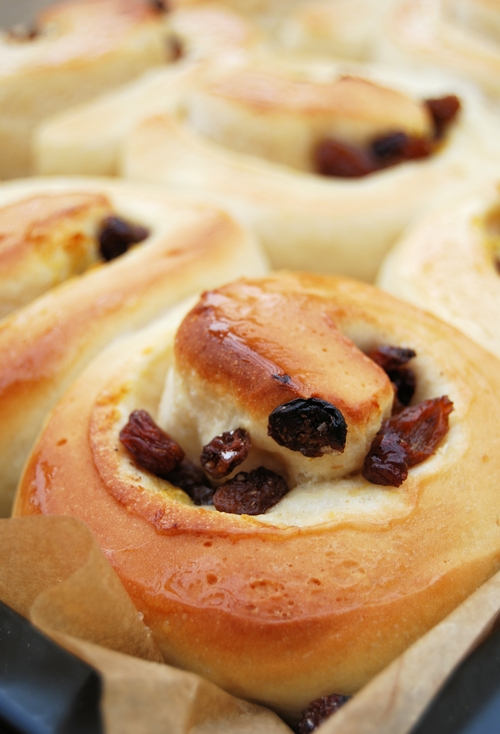
- A Chelsea bun, a type of spiced bun, a popular sweet roll from the United Kingdom
- Alternative names: Sweet bun
- Type: Sweet bread

A sweet roll or sweet bun refers to any of a number of sweet, baked, yeast-leavened breakfast, snack or dessert foods. They may contain spices, nuts, candied fruits, poppy seeds, etc., and are often glazed or topped with icing. Compared to regular bread dough, sweet roll dough is enriched with sugar, fat and eggs. They are often round, and are small enough to comprise a single serving. These differ from pastries, which are made from a paste-like dough; from cakes, which are typically unleavened or chemically leavened; and from doughnuts, which are deep fried.

Refrigerated ready-to-bake sweet roll dough is commercially available in grocery stores.

Sweet rolls are sometimes iced or decorated and/or contain a sweet filling, such as cinnamon, marzipan, or candied fruit.. Common variations include cinnamon rolls, sticky buns, and Belgian buns.

== Germany ==
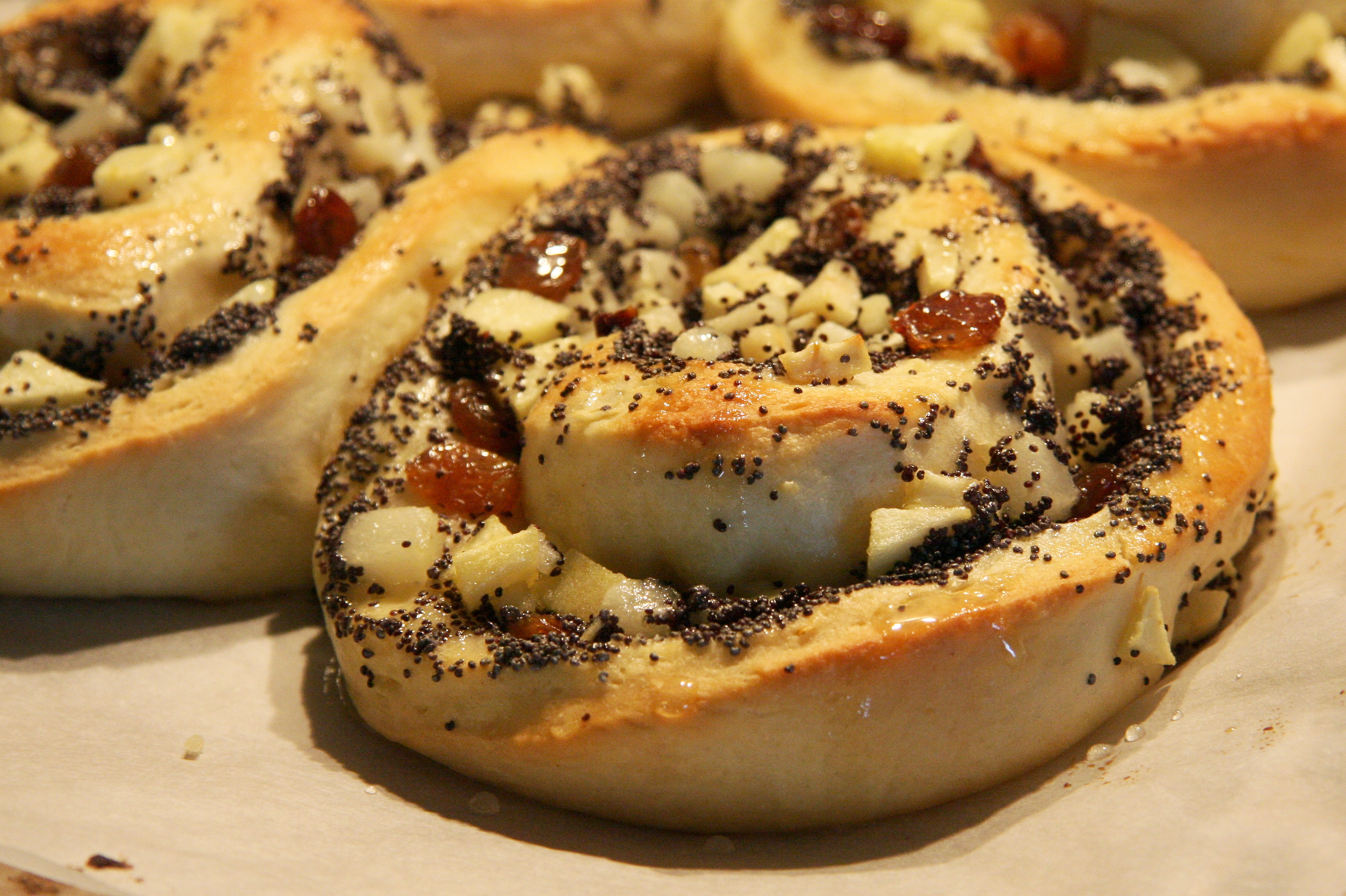
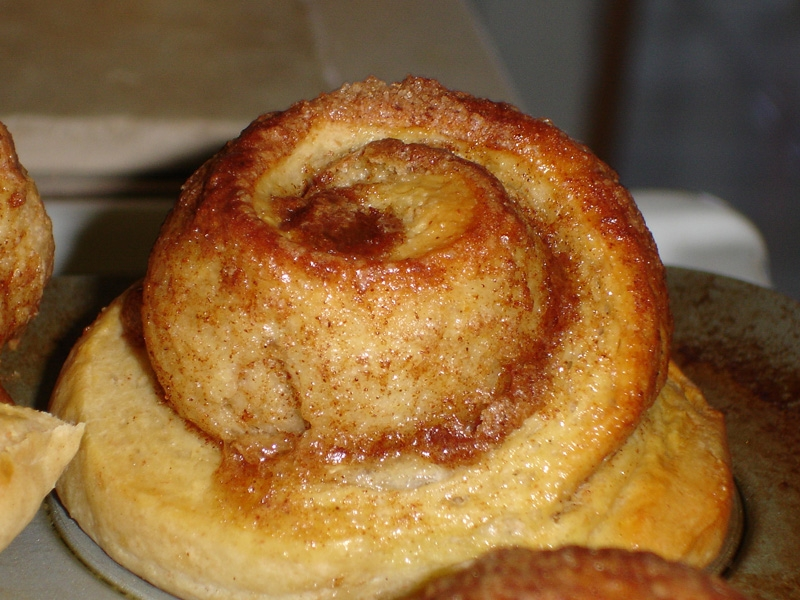
Examples of Schnecken

Schnecken are a type of sweet bun or roll of German origin. They typically contain raisins. The name Schnecken means snails in German and refers to the shape of the rolled dough. The bun is still common in Germany, Switzerland and Austria (in some regions as Schneckennudel), where the name is Schnecke (which is the German singular of Schnecken), and in other parts of northern Europe. They are more commonly known as pain au raisin in France. Popular variants are Nussschnecken (filled with nuts and often raisins as well), Mohnschnecken (with a poppyseed filling) and Zimtschnecken, which are quite similar to cinnamon rolls and Chelsea buns.

== Poland ==
In the Polish language, word for a sweet bun is drożdżówka or słodka bułka, the word for sweet bun with blueberries is jagodzianka, the word for a sweet roll with cinnamon (cinnamon roll) is cynamonka, the word for a sweet bun with strawberries is truskawianka, and the word for sweet bun with raspberries is malinianka. Sweet buns are popular type of pastry in Poland, especially for a second breakfast.

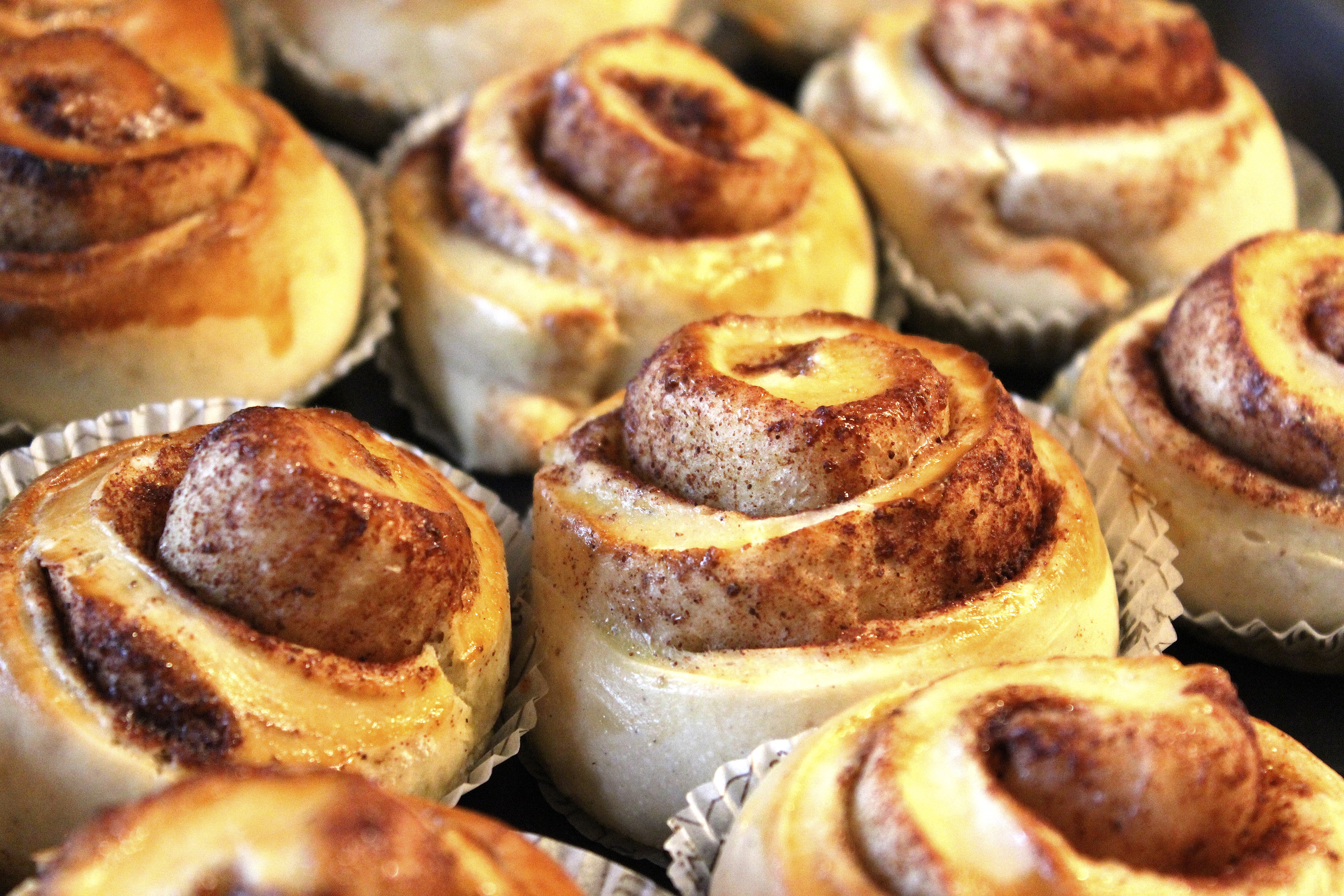
Swedish cinnamon rolls

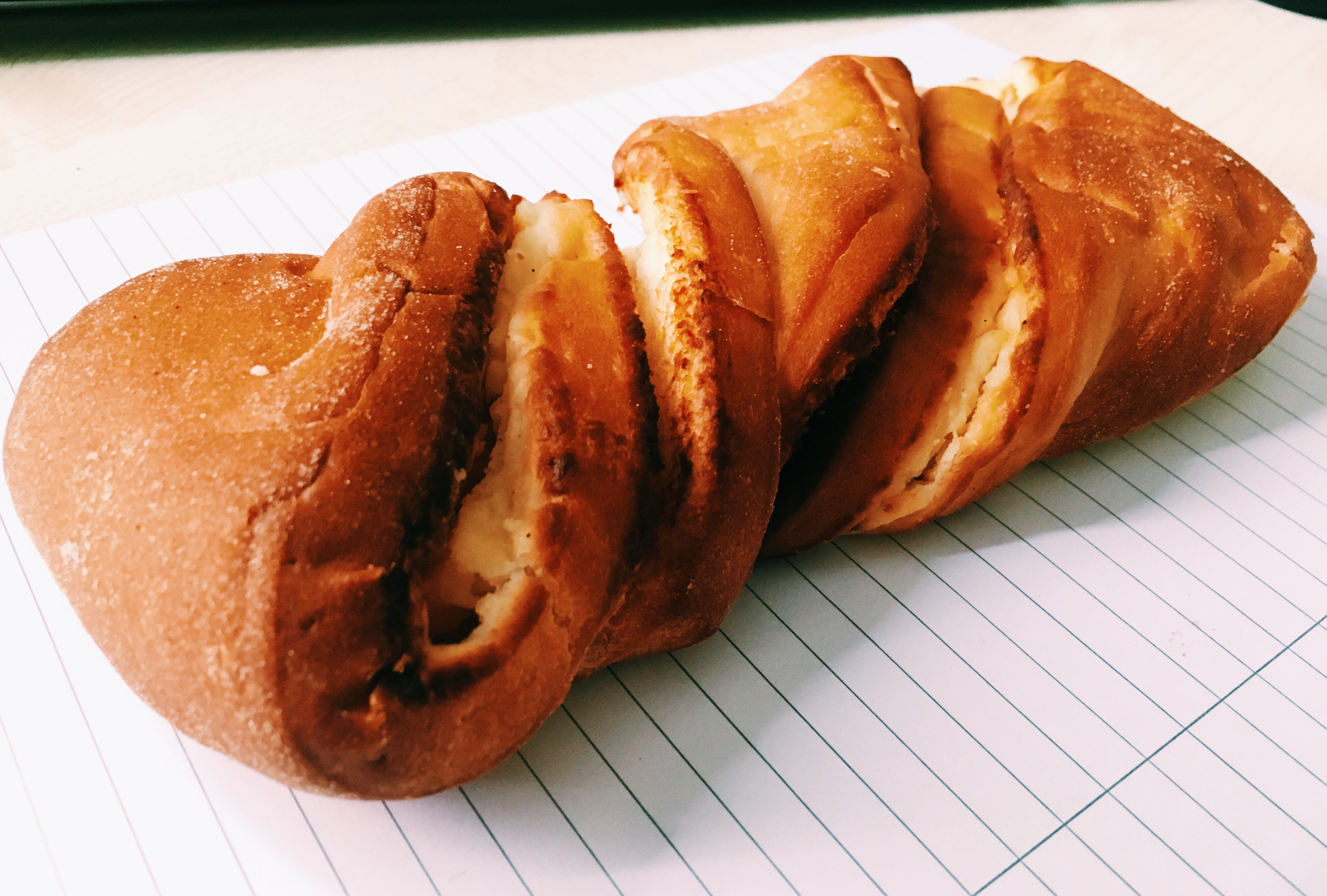
Polish warkocz z serem

== See also ==
- Cinnamon roll
- Sticky bun
- Belgian bun
- Anpan
- Corone
- Melonpan
- List of sweet breads
