= Broodje gezond =

Sandwich from the Netherlands

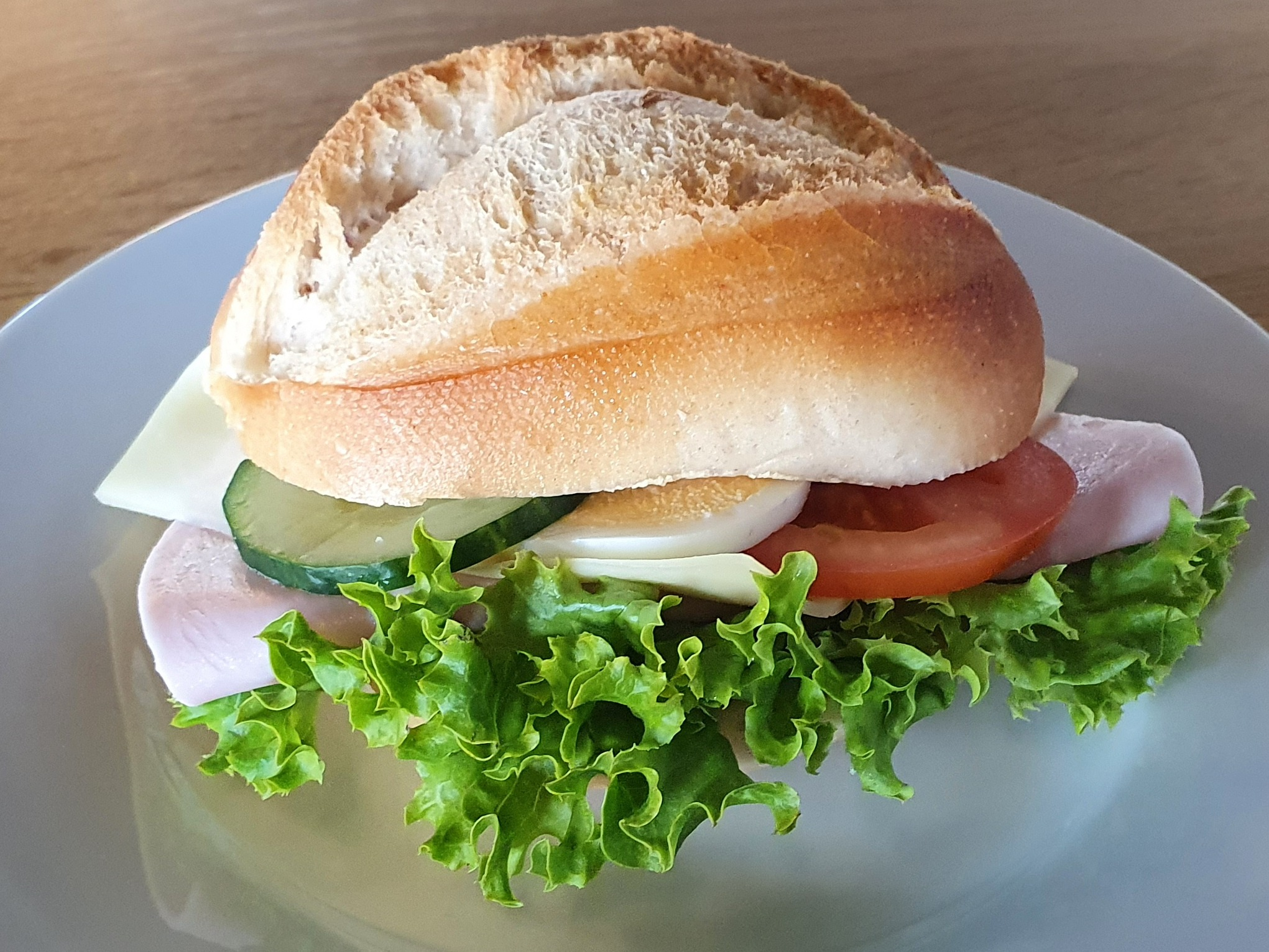
- Broodje gezond
- Type: Sandwich
- Course: Lunch
- Place of origin: The Netherlands
- Main ingredients: bread, cheese, ham, sliced boiled egg, vegetables, mayonnaise
- Variations: numerous

A broodje gezond (meaning "healthy sandwich") is a Dutch sandwich. The sandwich is often a piece of baguette, a white roll, or a pistolet. Toppings include, for example, cheese, ham, a boiled egg in slices, vegetables such as lettuce, arugula, tomato, pepper and/or cucumber. The sandwich is dressed with mayonnaise or a yogurt-based sauce. Due to the high levels of fat and salt and the low levels of vitamins, the term 'healthy' in the name is questionable.

It is commonly found in Dutch canteens, takeaway centers, or lunchrooms. There is no exact recipe.

This is an example of a term in the Dutch language where the adjective follows the noun, where usually the adjective precedes the noun.
