= Bart Chabot =

Dutch writer and poet

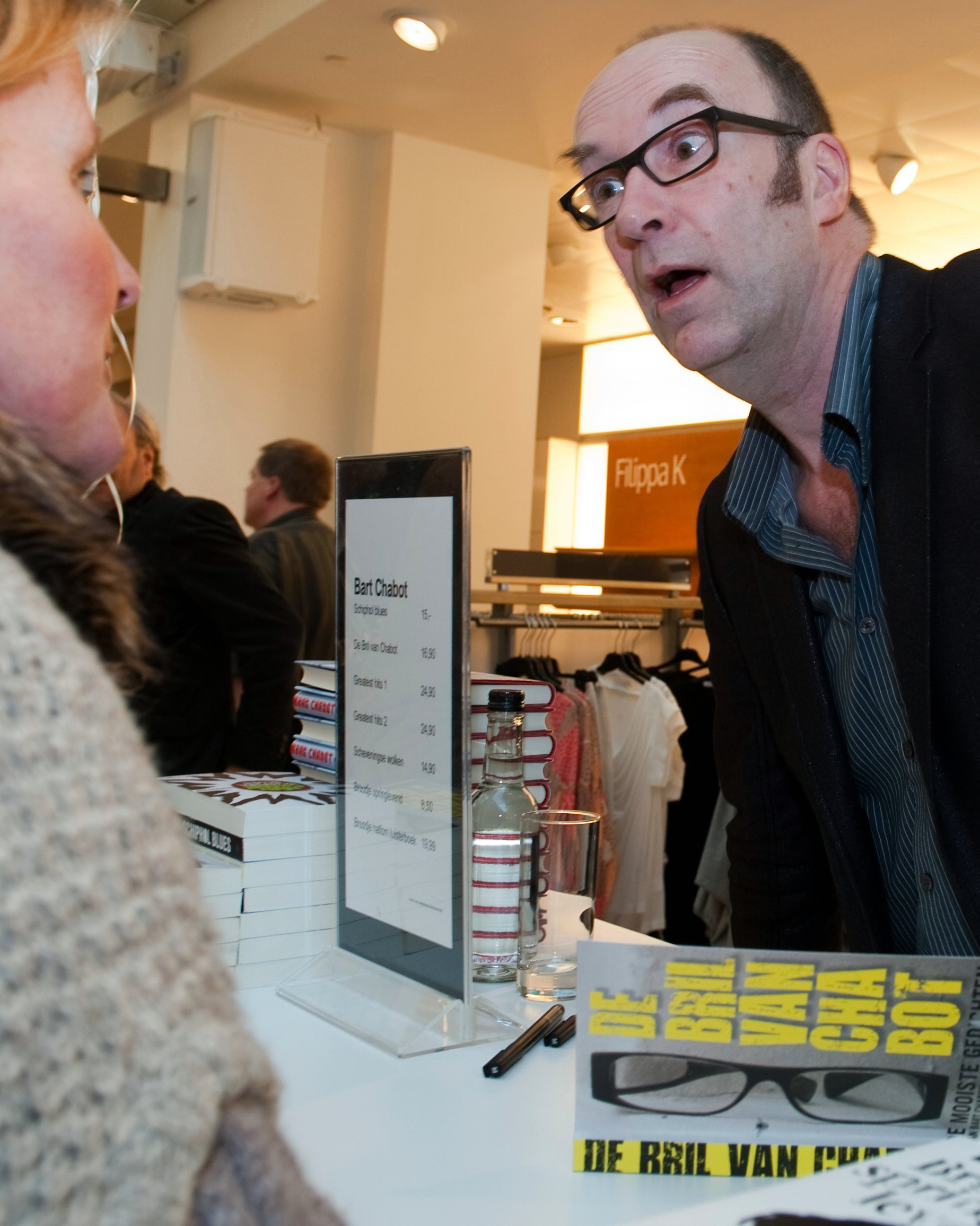
- Bart Chabot (2010)
- Born: Bartholomeus Antonius Wilhelmus Chabot; 26 September 1954 (age 71); The Hague, Netherlands
- Occupations: Poet and writer
- Notable work: Broodje Gezond (1996)

Bart Chabot (born 26 September 1954) is a Dutch writer and poet.

== Biography ==
Chabot went to the University of Leiden to study Dutch language and literature. During that period, he befriended the artists and drug users Jules Deelder and Herman Brood. Chabot's parents thoroughly disapproved. Soon after, Chabot decided to abandon his studies. In 1979, he made his debut as a poet with Als u zó gaat beginnen followed by Popcorn in 1981. Chabot did not want to cater to the world of literary critics, and attempted to write poetry everybody could understand with references to McDonalds, supermarkets, and rock-and-roll. Of his 1993 poetry collection Genadebrood, a reviewer in World Literature Today noted Chabot's cynical philosophy and commented on the depressing nature of many of the poems.

In 1996, Chabot wrote his first biography called Broodje gezond (Healthy sandwich) about Herman Brood. The book became a bestseller selling 50,000 copies by 2003, and received sequels as Broodje halfom (2001), Brood en spelen (2002) en Broodje springlevend (2003). In 2007, Chabot received the Johnny van Doorn Prize for literature. The biography even received critical acclaim from Arjan Peters of de Volkskrant for showing the degeneration of the elderly rock and roll singer while keeping a good sense of humour. The critic did show his prejudice for having to write about a common subject.

In 2014, Chabot composed the Grand Dictation of the Dutch Language which was an annual spelling contest organised by De Morgen, de Volkskrant and NTR. Chabot was a prominent participant in the previous editions of the spelling contest, and wanted to make it more accessible to normal people using familiar words. In 2020, Chabot published Mijn vaders hand, about his youth. Hebban expected a gloomy book, but Chabot's cynical irony managed to make them laugh once in a while. Hebban did question the commercial motivation of a television personality writing about his youth. Carel Peeters of Vrij Nederland observed that Chabot is always somewhere else, and that triggered him to go beyond acceptable and normal patterns.

Chabot is also a columnist for Oor and Playboy, and a television personality making frequent appearances on Pauw & Witteman and Barend & Van Dorp.

In 1989, Chabot embarked on a theatre tour with Remco Campert and Jan Mulder. In 1999 he decided to go on the road again this time with Jules Deelder and Herman Brood.

In autumn 2006, Chabot participated in the television program De Slimste Mens, which aimed to find the smartest person in a group of celebrities. Chabot won.

== Family ==
Bart Chabot married Yolanda in 1987. The couple has four sons whom he taught to write. "Writing starts with empathy, you don't put yourself in the centre, but the world around you," according to Bart. The writing muse got passed on, and Sebastiaan and Splinter are columnists in their own right. Splinter had even gone beyond that, and has, after graduating from the University of Amsterdam, become a television presenter for NPO 3.

== Works ==
Title	Publisher	Year	Isbn
Als u zó gaat beginnen	Meulenhoff	1979	ISBN 9070247097
Popcorn	De Bezige Bij	1981	ISBN 9023445694
Captain America	De Bezige Bij	1982	ISBN 9023445805
!Stand	De Bezige Bij	1985	ISBN 9023446208
Babylon Hotel	De Bezige Bij	1988	ISBN 9023430905
Duingheest : novellen	De Bezige Bij	1990	ISBN 9023431677
Genadebrood	De Bezige Bij	1993	ISBN 902344714X
De kootjesblues	Nijgh & Van Ditmar	2000	ISBN 9038813996
Broodje gezond	Nijgh & Van Ditmar	2001	ISBN 9038814070
Broodje halfom	Nijgh & Van Ditmar	2001	ISBN 9038814046
Brood en spelen	Nijgh & Van Ditmar	2002	ISBN 9038814089
Broodje springlevend	Nijgh & Van Ditmar	2003	ISBN 9038814135
Zand erover	Nijgh & Van Ditmar	2003	ISBN 903881416X
Greatest Hits #1	De Bezige Bij	2004	ISBN 9789023454922
Elvistranen	Nijgh & Van Ditmar	2004	ISBN 9038814194
Fort Knox	Nijgh & Van Ditmar	2005	ISBN 9038814364
Broodje halfom	Nijgh & Van Ditmar	2006	ISBN 9038814402
McPain	Nijgh & Van Ditmar	2007	ISBN 9789038814506
Anna's hoeve	Nijgh & Van Ditmar	2007	ISBN 9789038890029
Cadillac boogie	Nijgh & Van Ditmar	2007	ISBN 9789038890012
Dracula's ontbijt	Nijgh & Van Ditmar	2007	ISBN 9789038890036
De Bril van Chabot	De Bezige Bij	2008	ISBN 9789023437093
Scheveningse wolken	De Bezige Bij	2009	ISBN 9789023455103
Greatest Hits #2	De Bezige Bij	2009	ISBN 9789023441335
Schiphol blues	De Bezige Bij	2009	ISBN 9789023438472
De Patatbalie	De Bezige Bij	2010	ISBN 9789023463214
Up on the Hilton roof	De Bezige Bij	2011	ISBN 9789023459026
Diepere lagen	De Bezige Bij	2011	ISBN 9789023465621
Triggerhappy	De Bezige Bij	2013	ISBN 9789023473589
Zestig	De Bezige Bij	2014	ISBN 9789023487944
Easy Street	De Bezige Bij	2016	ISBN 9789023498414
Bananenrepubliek	De Bezige Bij	2016	ISBN 9789023494812
