= Bread roll =

Small loaf of bread

Roll
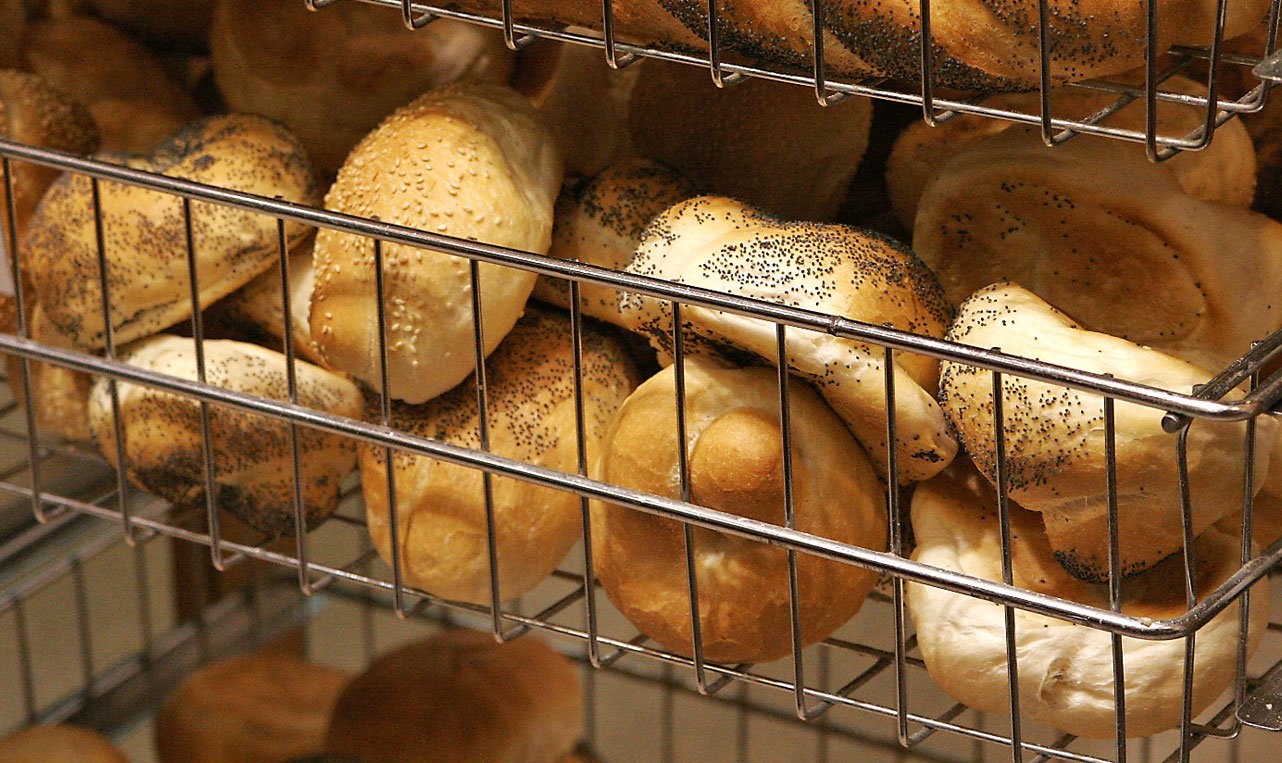
- Bread rolls at a German bakery
- Type: Bread
- Course: Side dish

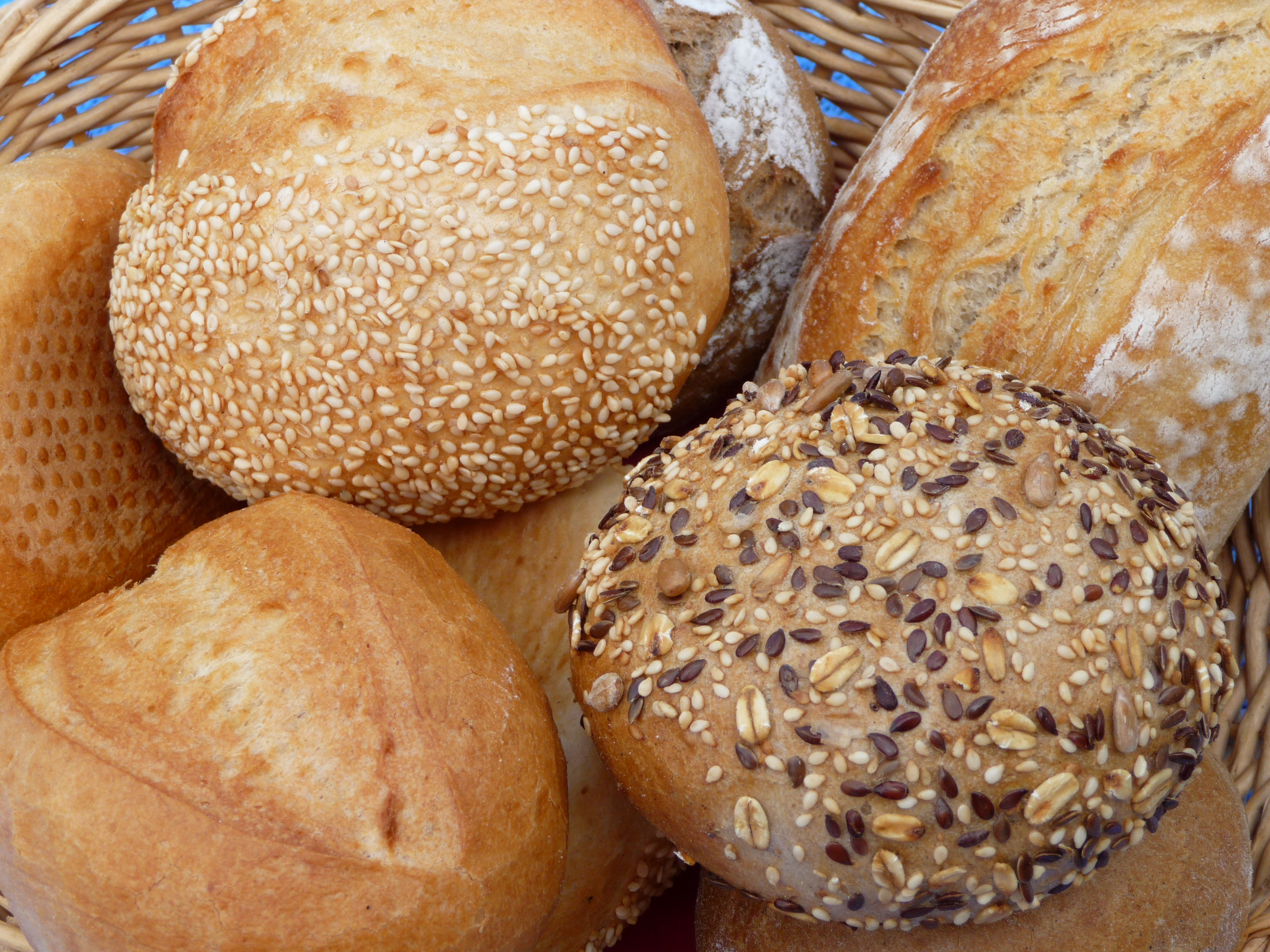
Assortment of different German style bread rolls

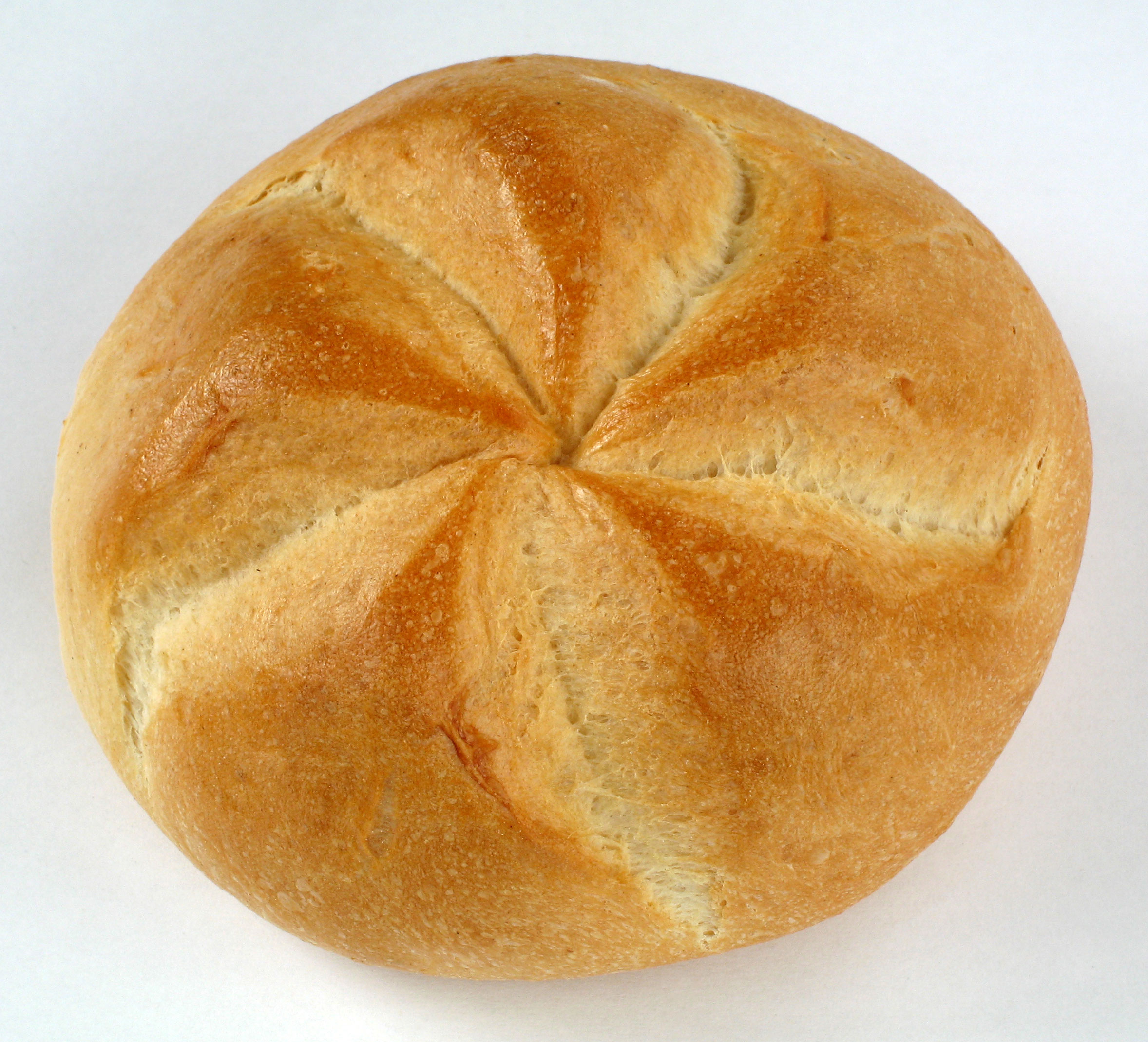
Typical Austrian bread roll, called "Kaisersemmel"

A bread roll is a small, oblong (or round, triangular or rhomboid) individual loaf of bread, usually served with a meal and eaten plain or with butter. Rolls can be served whole or cut and filled to make a sandwich.

== Regional variations ==
=== Europe ===
Rolls are common as bread throughout Europe, under many names, including local and dialectal ones, often diminutives of "bread".

Rolls range from white rolls made with wheat flour, to dark rolls containing mostly rye flour. Many variants include spices, such as coriander and cumin, or nuts. Also common are bread rolls containing or garnished with whole seeds such as sesame, poppy, pumpkin or sunflower.

French rolls are various bread rolls with a baguette-like crust.

In Germany, rolls are Brötchen; in Switzerland, Brötli. Other German names include Rundstück ("round piece") in Hamburg and Schleswig-Holstein; Weckerl or more specific Semmel in Austria, Saxony and southern Bavaria; Weck and Weckle in much of Baden-Württemberg, Franconia and Saarland; Schrippe in Berlin and parts of Brandenburg. Some of these names are used in other European languages as well, for example as zsemle in Hungarian, or rundstykker ("round pieces") in Danish and Norwegian. In the Netherlands they are called broodje. The Doppelweck or Doppelbrötchen is a type of bread roll originating from the Saarland consisting of two rolls joined together side-by-side before baking. Similarly, the Röggelchen of the Rhineland is a double rye roll. A lye roll is a roll-shaped pretzel.

The Italian diminutive panino means both the roll and a sandwich made from a roll. The Kaisersemmel reappears in Italy as the Michetta or Rosetta. In Swedish, a bread roll is a (frukost) bulle '(breakfast) bun', franskbrödbulle 'French bread bun' or simply fralla 'bun', and is eaten with butter and a topping (marmalade, cheese, ham, salami) for special weekend breakfasts. In Ticino, Switzerland, pane ticinese is made to separate into rolls.

Carcaça and papo-seco are two traditional Portuguese breads.

On the Spanish island of Mallorca, the llonguet is also known as panet francès, meaning 'small French bread' or 'French bread roll' in Catalan.

Lagana is the traditional Greek flatbread baked exclusively on Clean Monday (Kathara Deftera).

There are many regional varieties of bread rolls in the United Kingdom: roll, bap, barm cake, batch, breadcake, bun, cob, teacake and muffin.

In Ireland, the blaa is a specialty of County Kilkenny.

=== Arab world ===
Bread rolls are popular in the Arab world and come in many varieties and names, "French-like" bread rolls exist in many forms.

Eish fino is a baguette-like bread roll that is popular in Egypt. It is also known as Samouli bread (Arabic: صامولي). "Samoon" bread (Arabic: سمون, not to be confused with samoon bread) is used in the Arab world for a variety of medium to high rising breads, like burger buns. Other names for or varieties of bread rolls include hamam bread (Arabic: حمام, romanized: ḥamām), popular in Jordan.

Bread rolls are consumed in large quantities around the region, and are considered everyday items, to the extent that the price of some varieties of bread rolls is subsidized in some countries, like Jordan, Egypt, and Syria.

=== Asia ===
In Hong Kong and Macau, dyun faat baau (短法包, literally "short French bread" or "short baguette"), also known as the zyu zai baau (豬仔包, "piggy bun"), is used to make pork chop buns.

=== India ===
Fried in butter and served with a mashed vegetable curry, bread rolls (pav) are a key component of the popular Mumbai street snack pav bhaji.

=== Latin America ===
Across Latin America, the terms pan francés (Spanish) or pão francês (Portuguese), both meaning "French bread", refer to various baguette-like bread rolls made with wheat flour, salt, water and yeast.

==== Argentina, Paraguay, and Uruguay ====
In Argentina, Paraguay, and Uruguay, pan felipe (Felipe bread) is a commonly eaten French bread roll.

In Uruguay, a denser version is known as pan marsellés (Marseilles bread). The Marseille bread called pan marsellés in Uruguay is different from the Brazilian pão francês. The Brazilian type is less dense and lighter and crispier. However, the Uruguayan version is made with a denser bread dough, resulting in a harder bread (similar to Italian bread), with the crust covered in maize flour before baking.

==== Bolivia, Chile, and Peru ====
In Bolivia and Chile, the marraqueta is sometimes called pan francés. In Peru, the term pan francés (or sometimes called pan francés peruano) is different from the marraqueta.

==== Brazil ====
The most popular bread in Brazil is the light and crispy pão francês. Pão francês is known by several names throughout Brazil, such as cacetinho, pãozinho (little bread), pão de trigo (wheat bread), pão de sal (salt bread), pão de água (water bread), pão aguado (watery bread), careca, and pão Jacó (Jacó bread). It is commonly found in delis and bakeries throughout Brazil.

==== Mexico and Central America ====
In the region of Comarca Lagunera in northeastern Mexico, pan francés (or sometimes called pan francés lagunero) is an important part of daily dining.

In other parts of Mexico and Central America, the word pan francés is used to refer to bolillo.

=== United States ===
The Parker House roll is a soft, sweet roll invented in Boston in the 1870s.

== Gallery ==
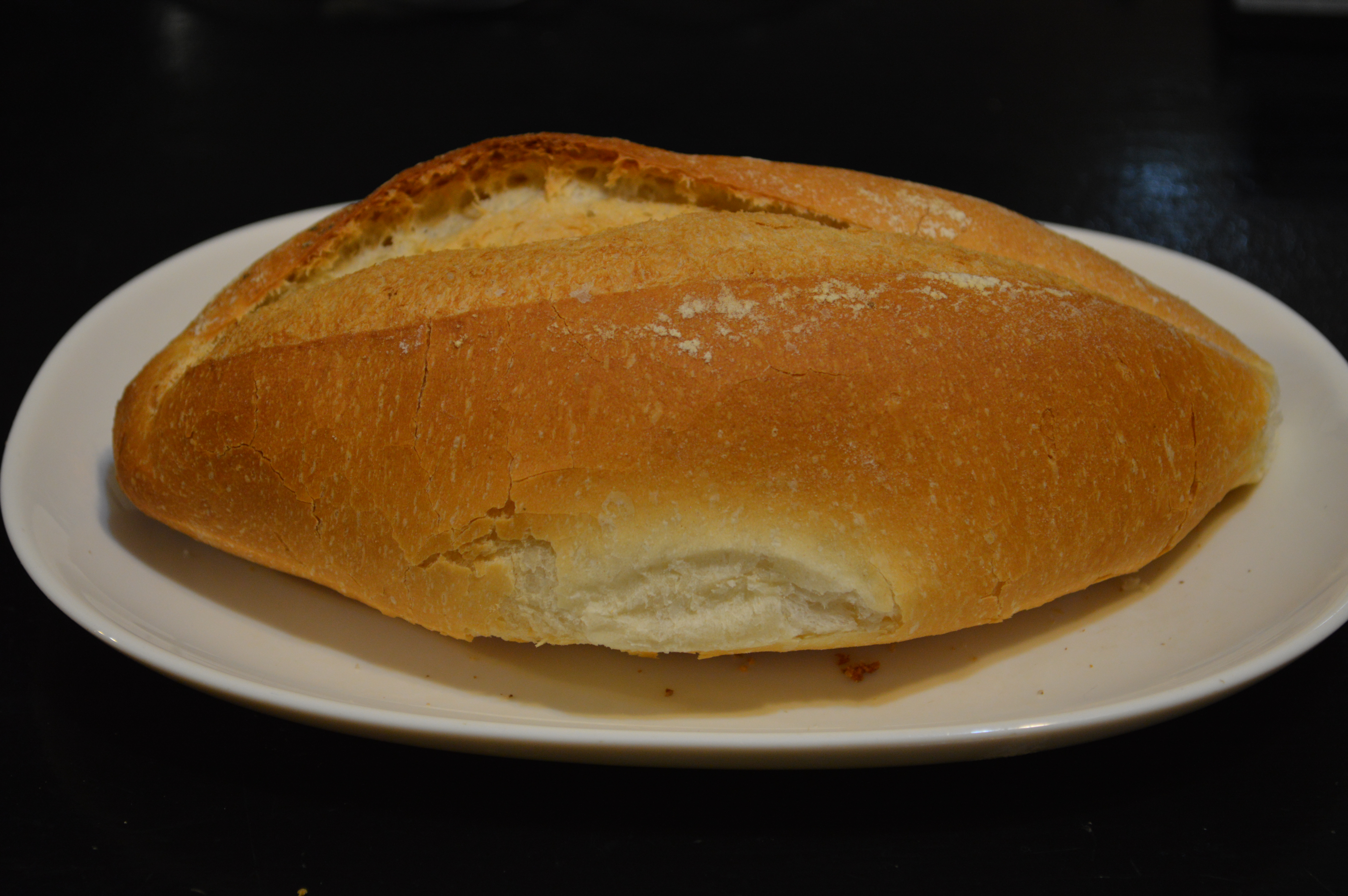
A bolillo (Mexico)

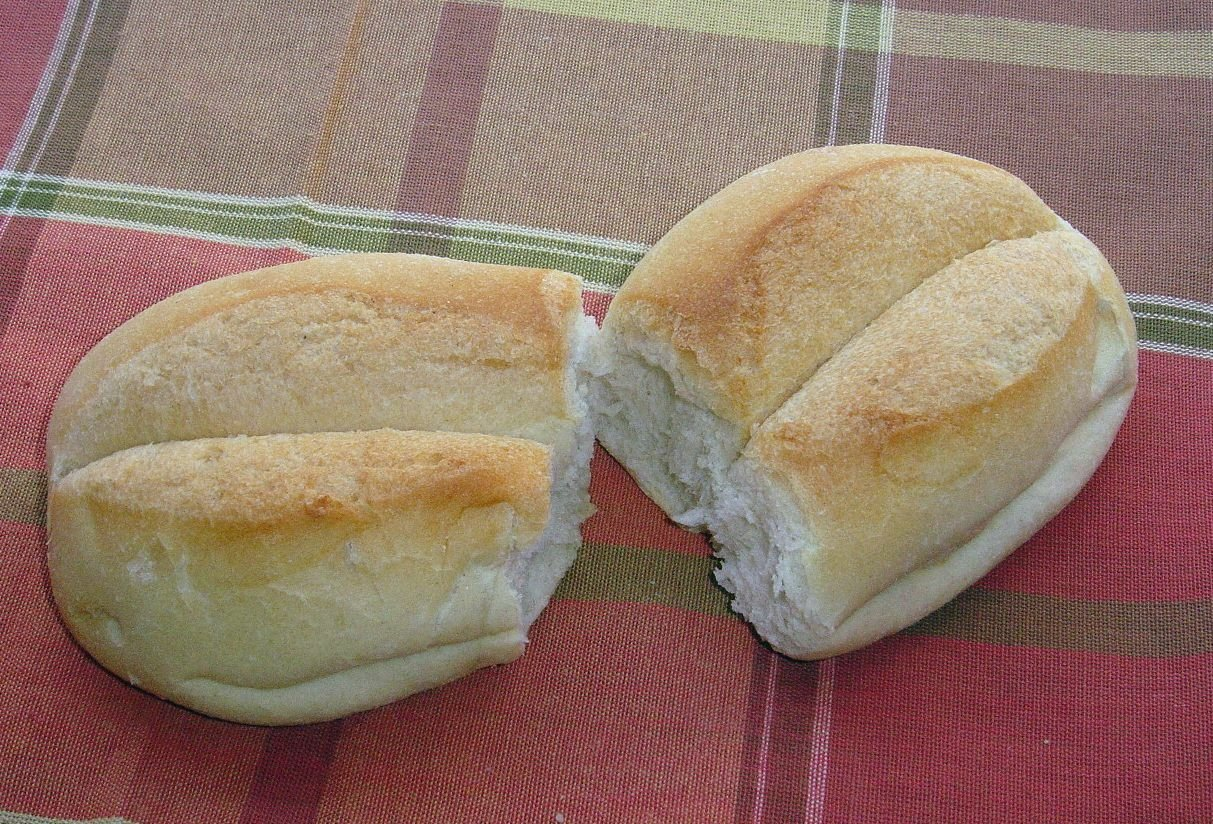
A marraqueta (Chile)

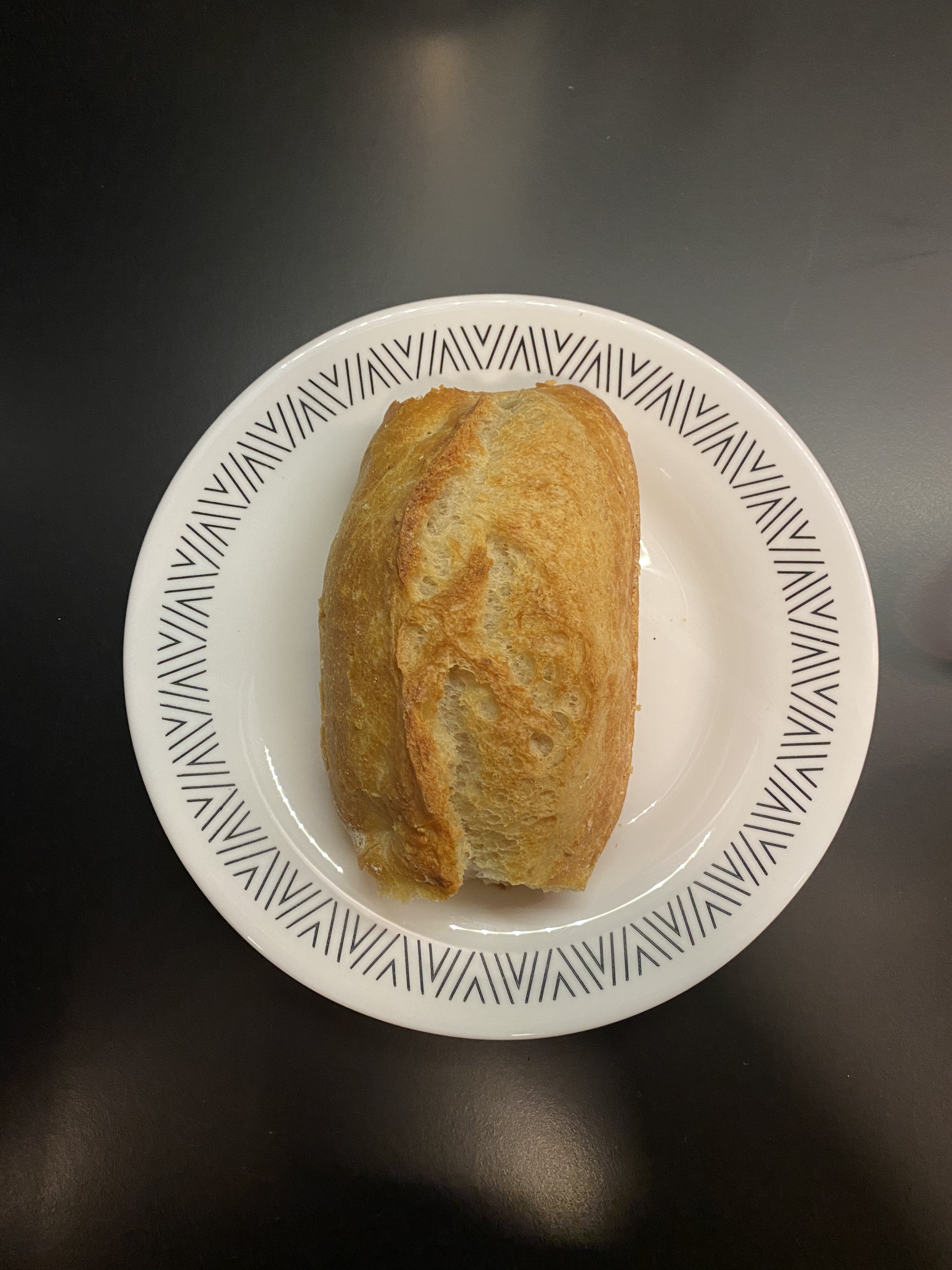
A marraqueta paceña (Bolivia)

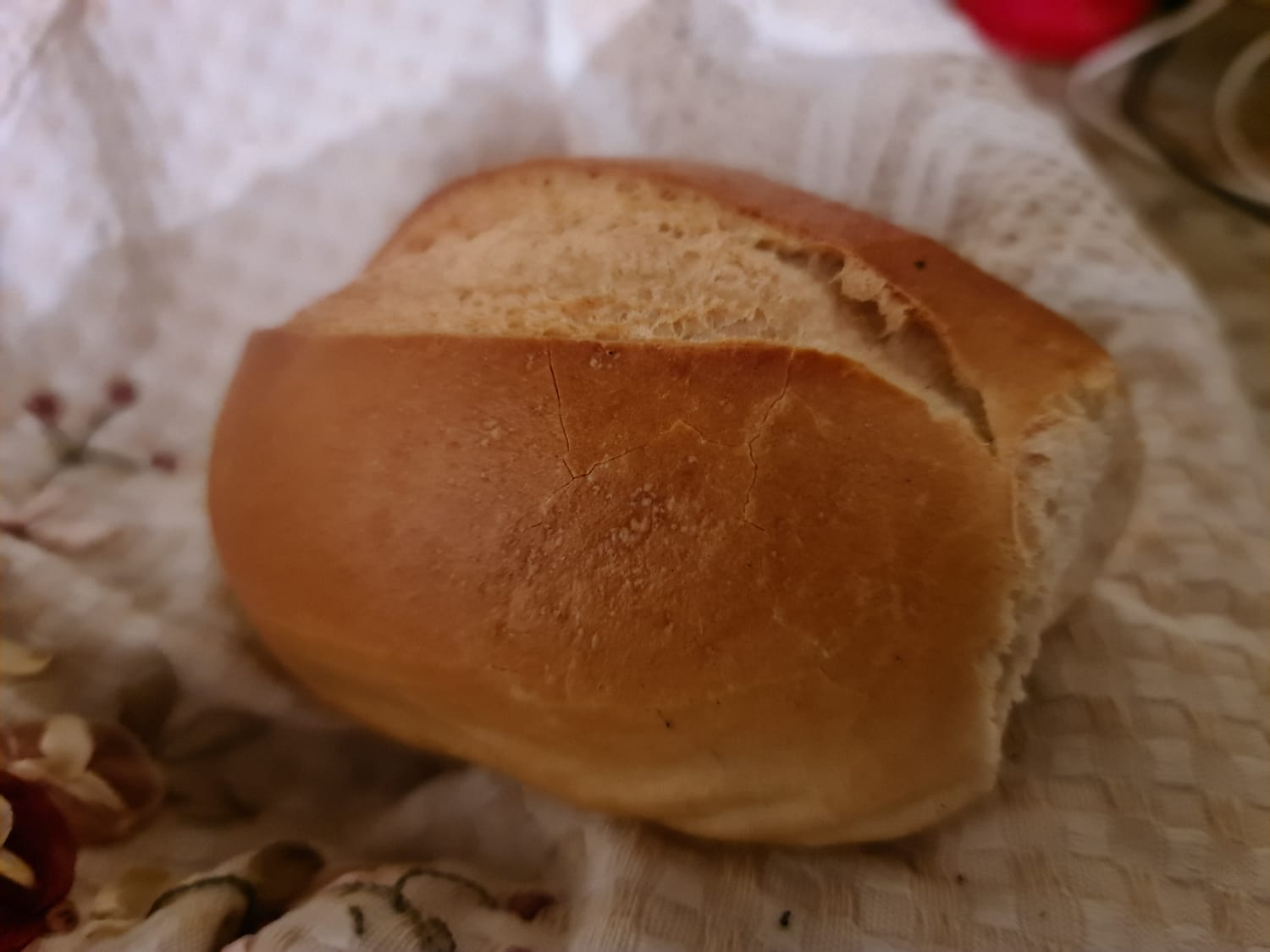
A pan felipe (Uruguay)

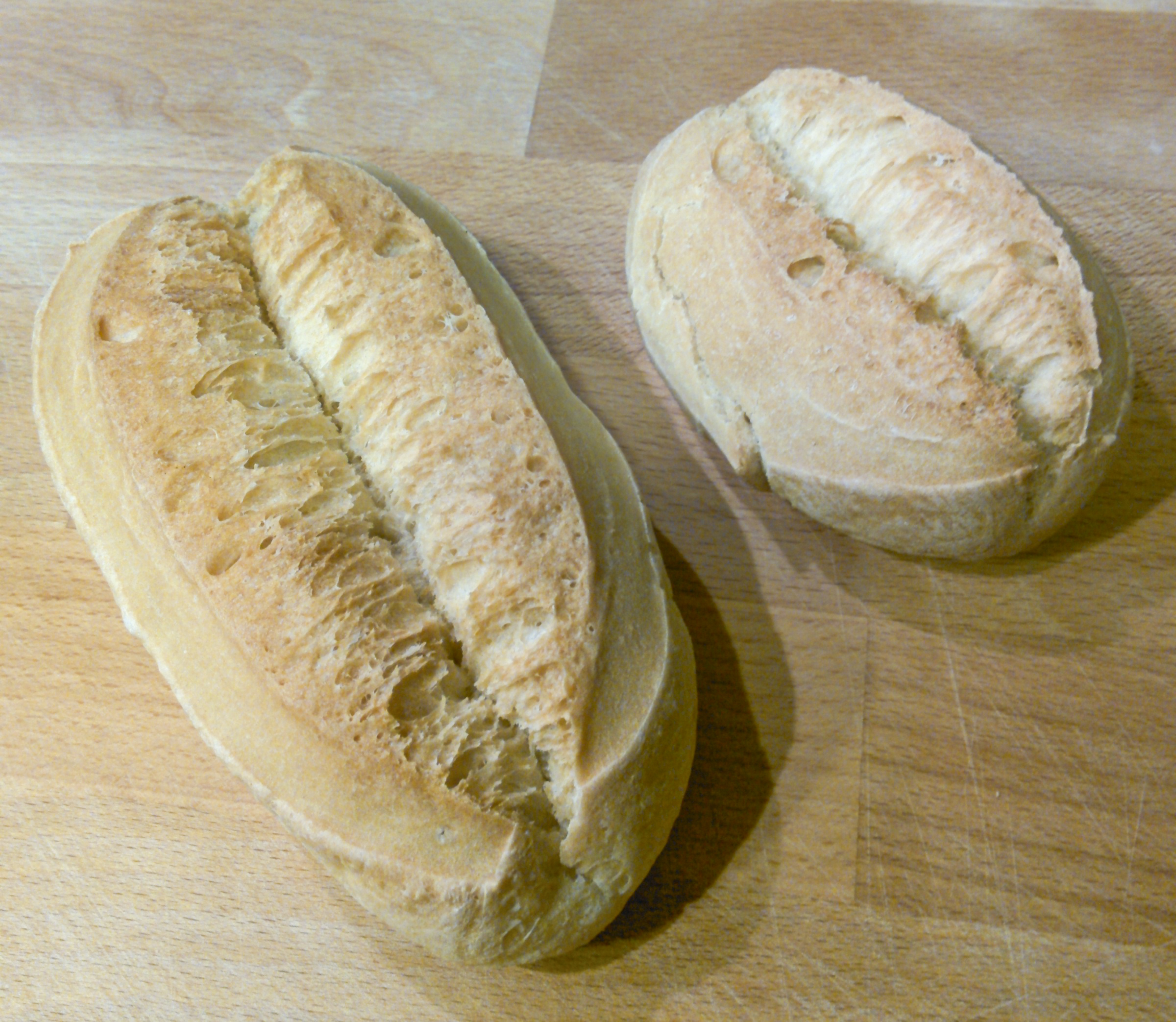
Llonguets (Mallorca)

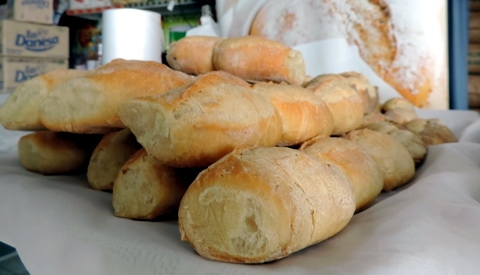
Marraquetas tacneñas (Peru)

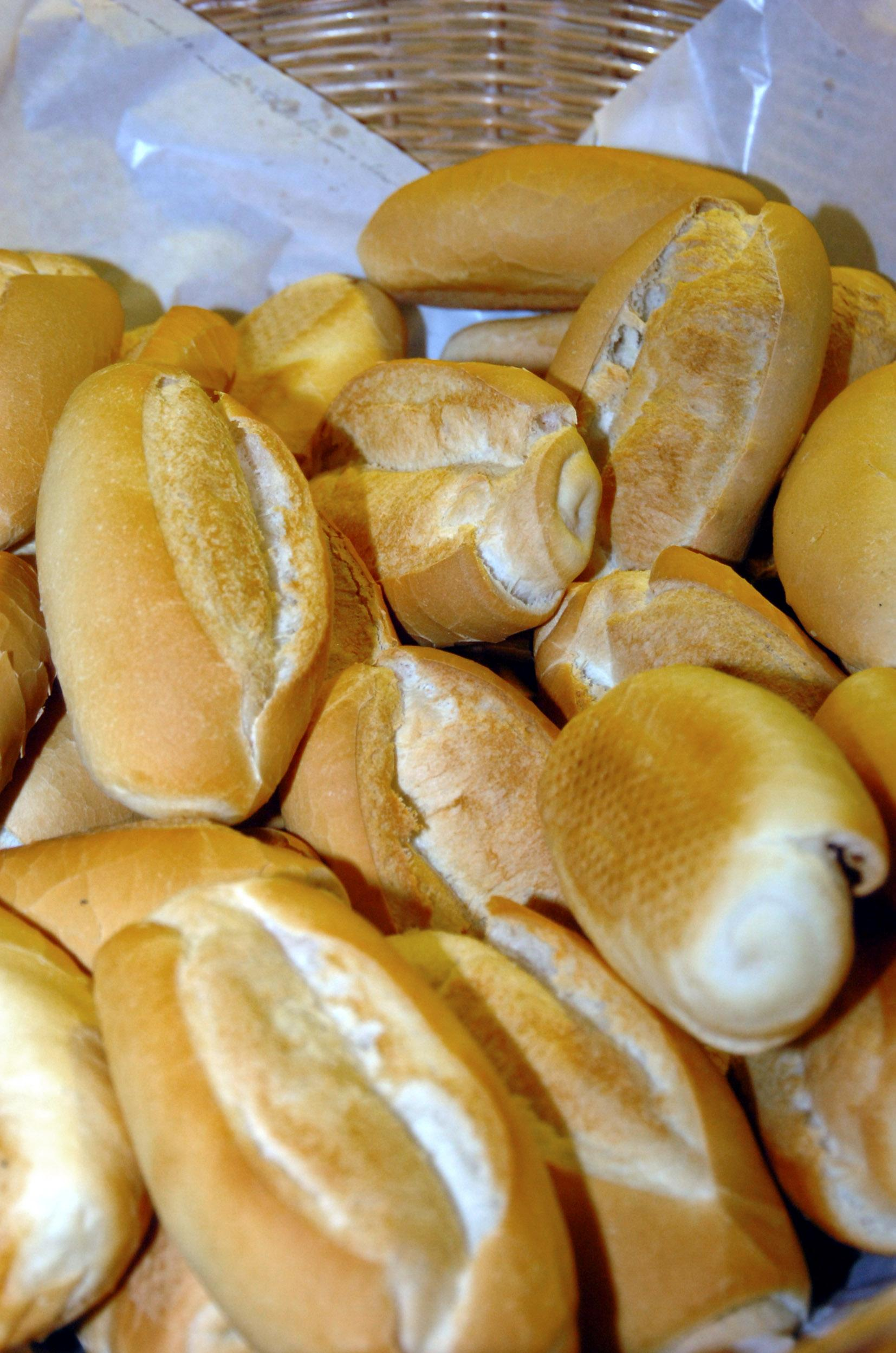
Pães franceses (Brazil)

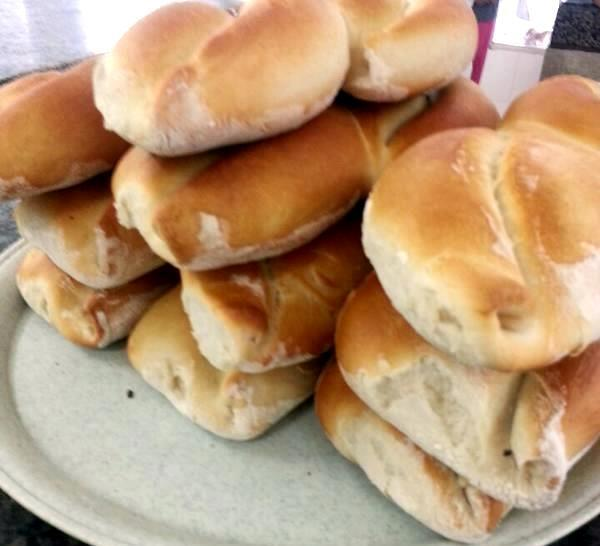
Panes franceses (Mexico)

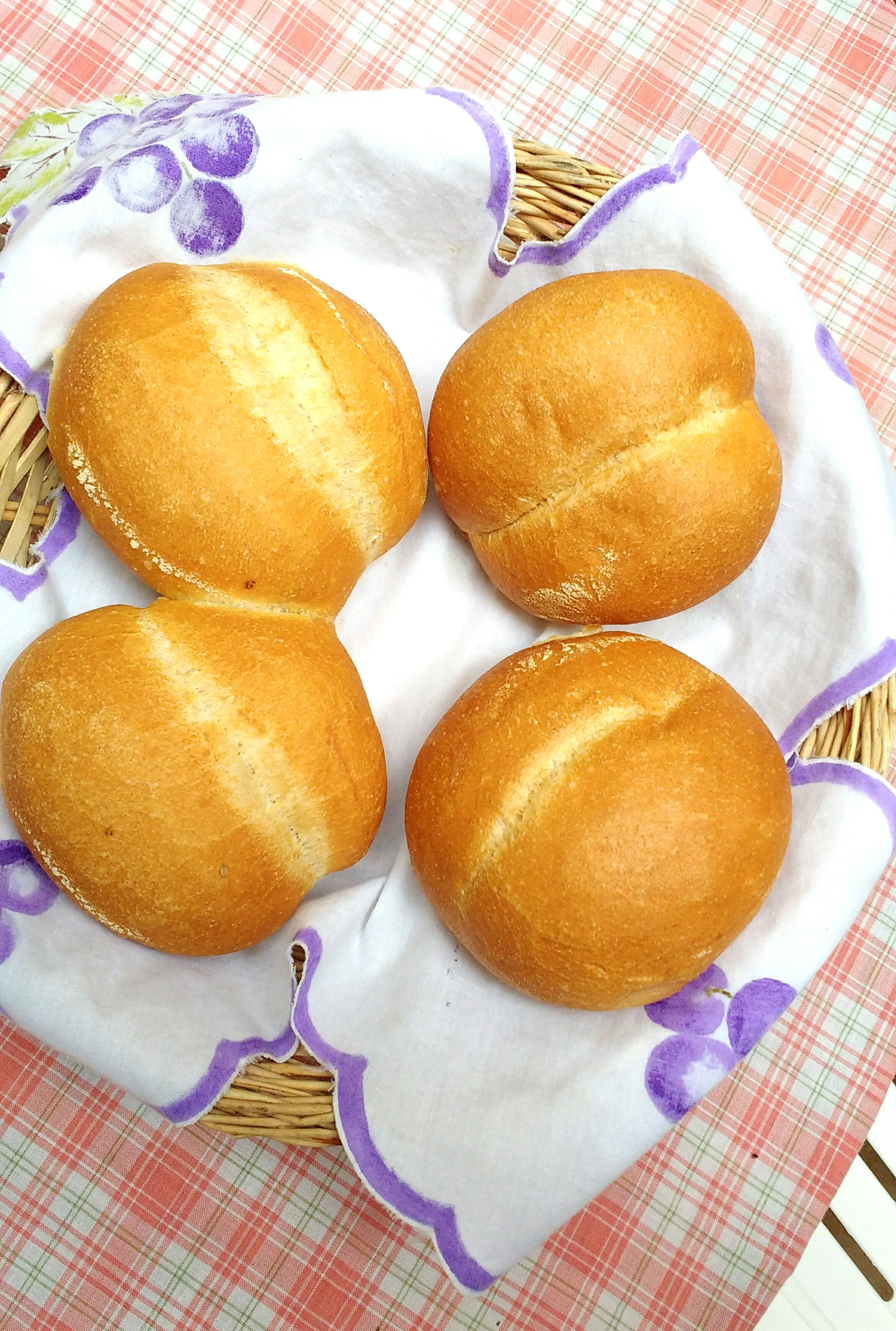
Panes franceses (Peru)

Panes marselleses (Uruguay)

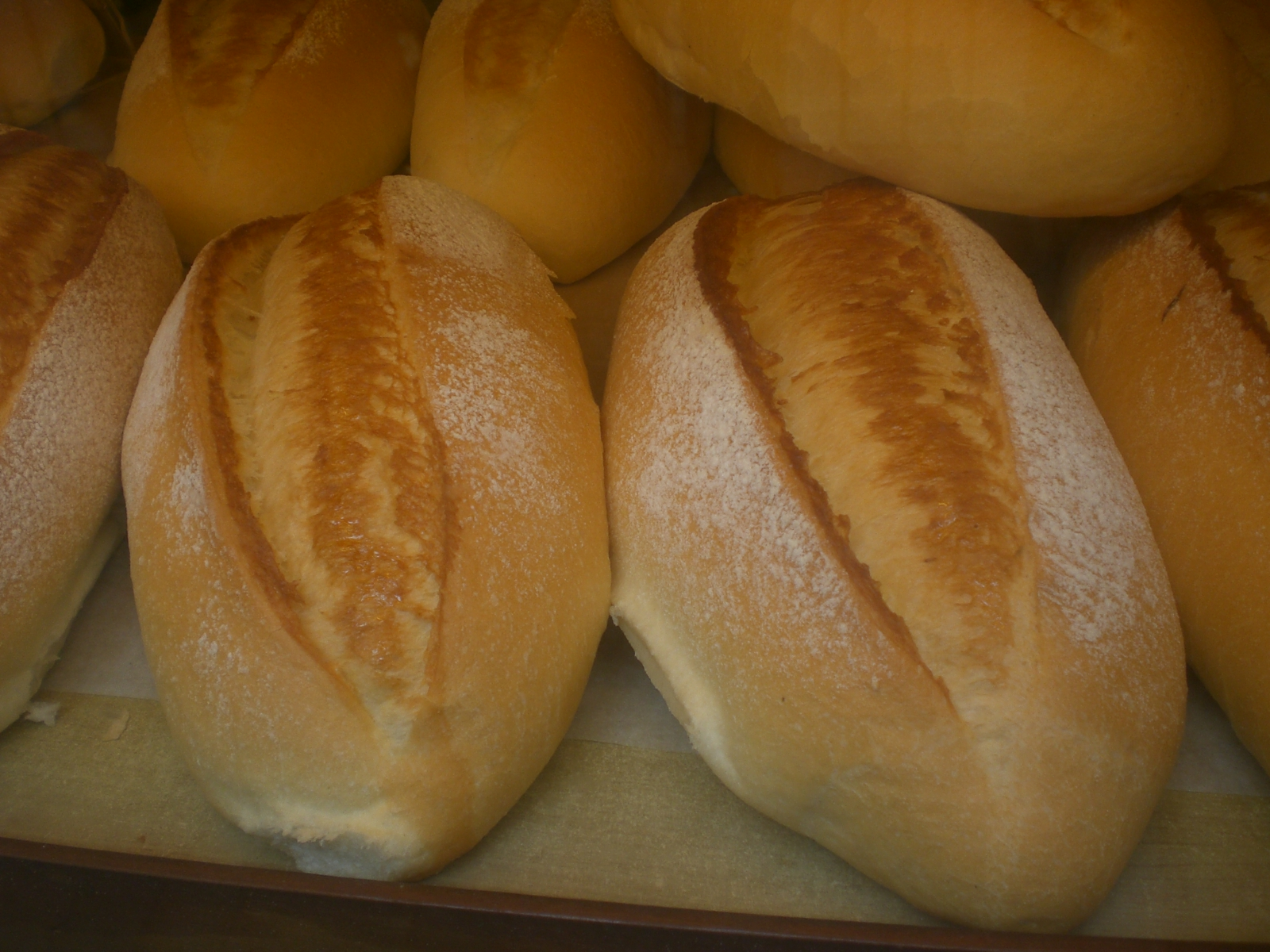
Piggy buns (Hong Kong)

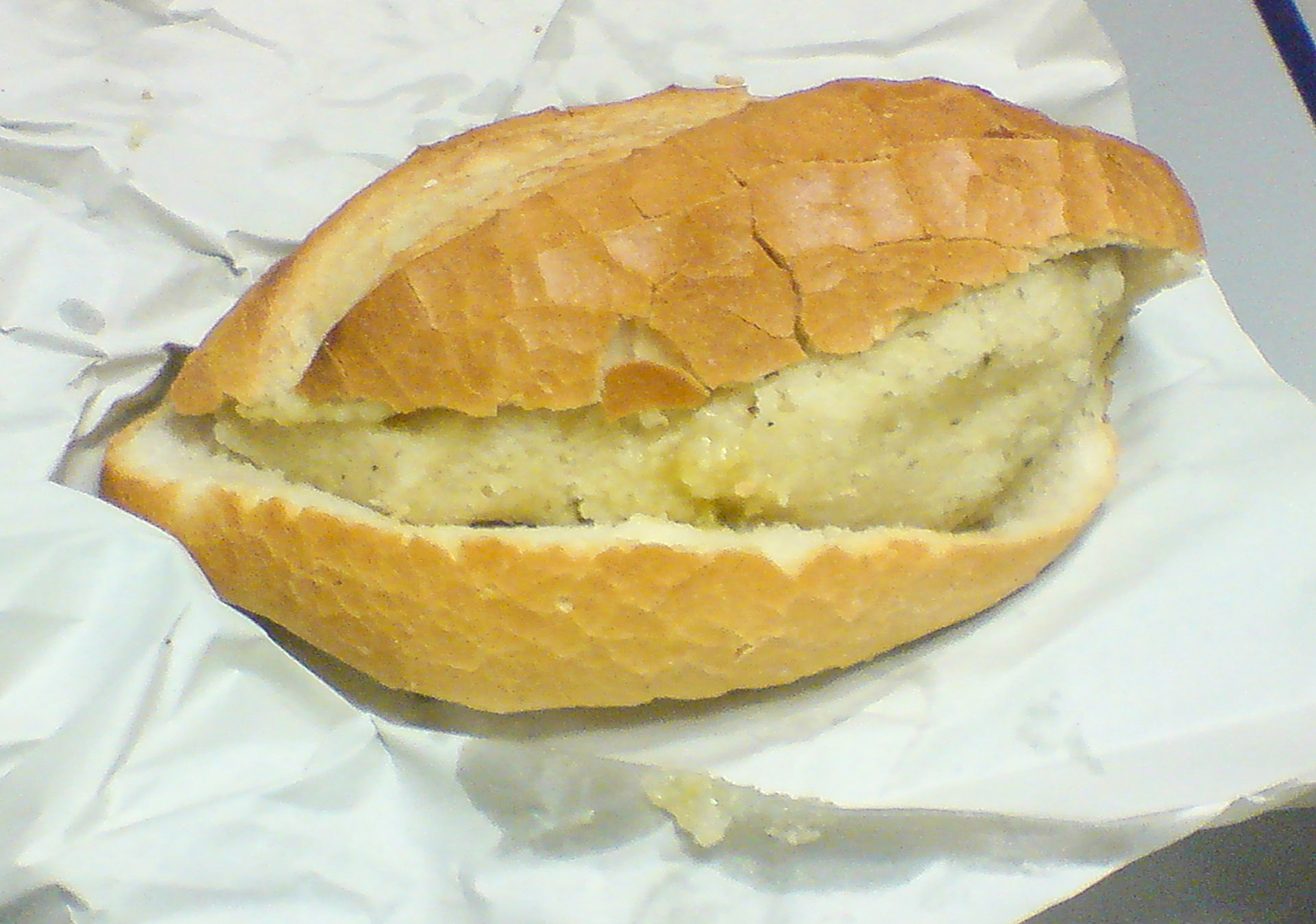
A guajolota

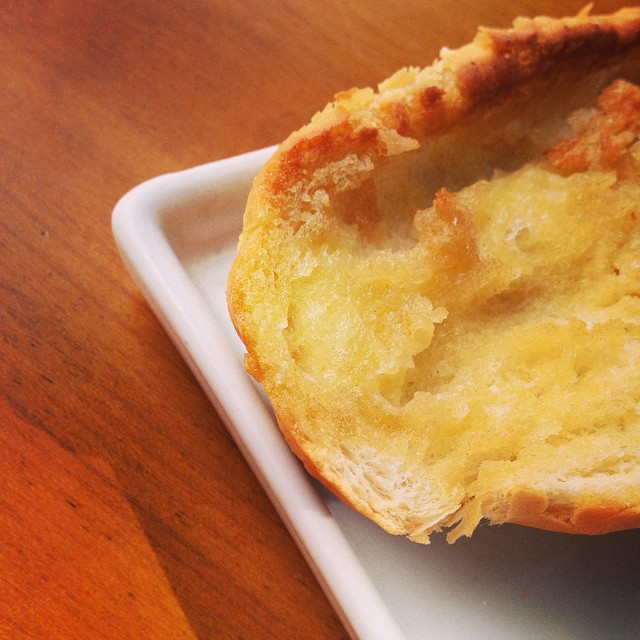
A pão na chapa

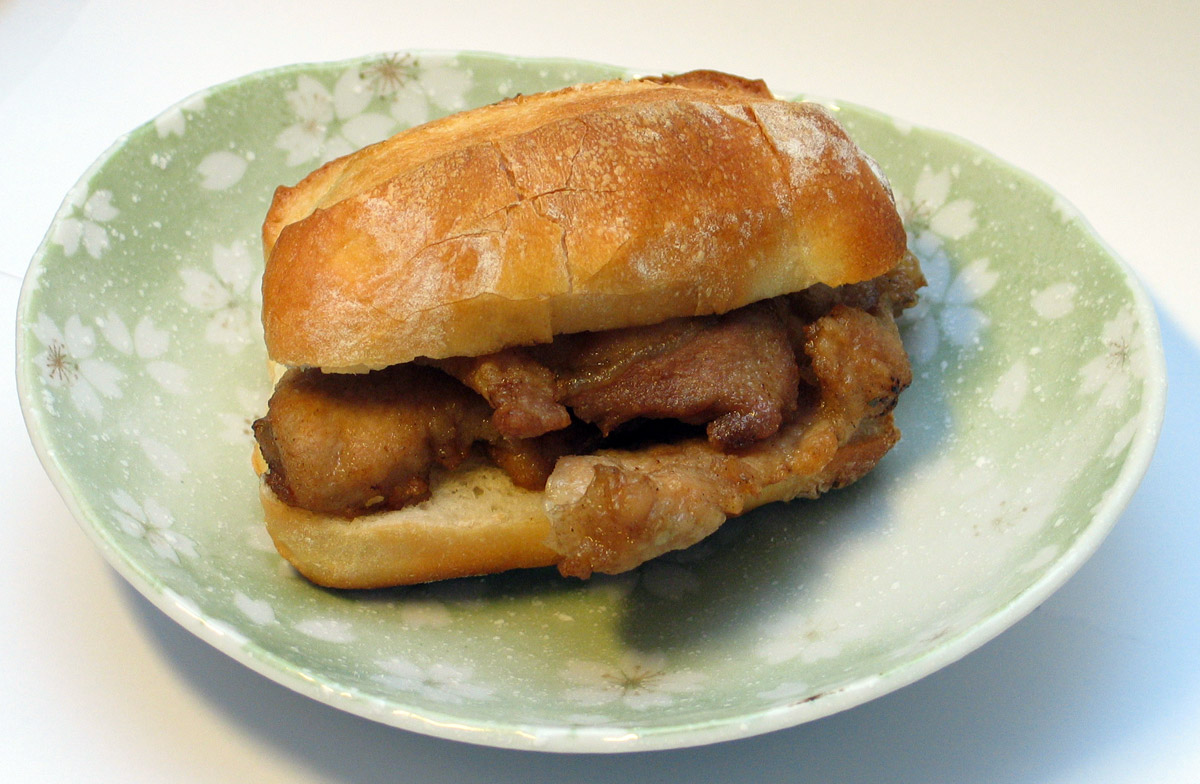
A pork chop bun

== See also ==
- List of bread rolls
- Bagel
- Bánh mì
- Boule (bread)
- Breakfast roll
- Chicken fillet roll
- Croissant
- Hoagie roll
- List of baked goods
- List of breads
- List of bread dishes
- List of buns
- Ovelgönne bread roll
- Pistolet
- Scuffler
