= Röggelchen =

Double bread roll made with rye flour

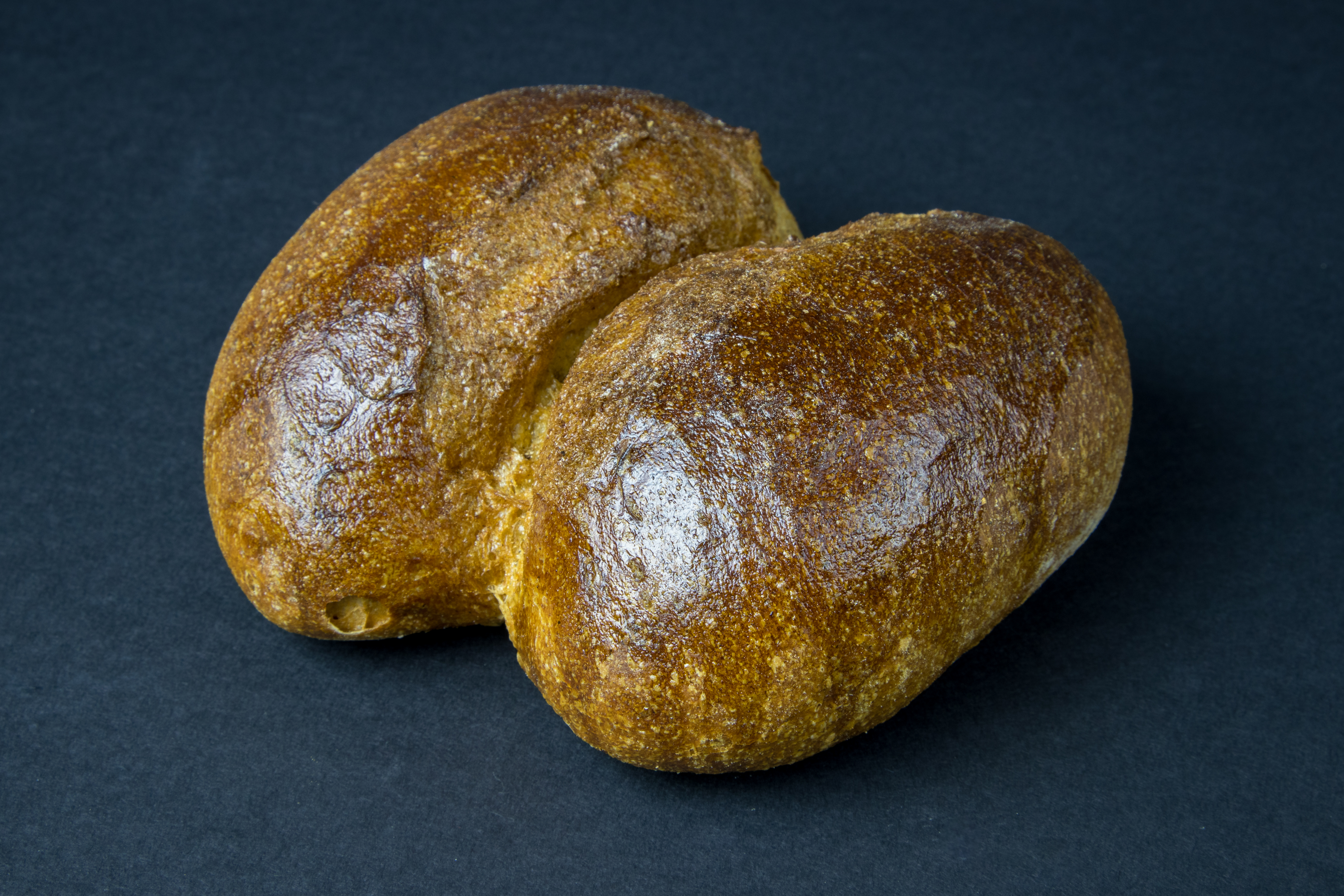
Röggelchen

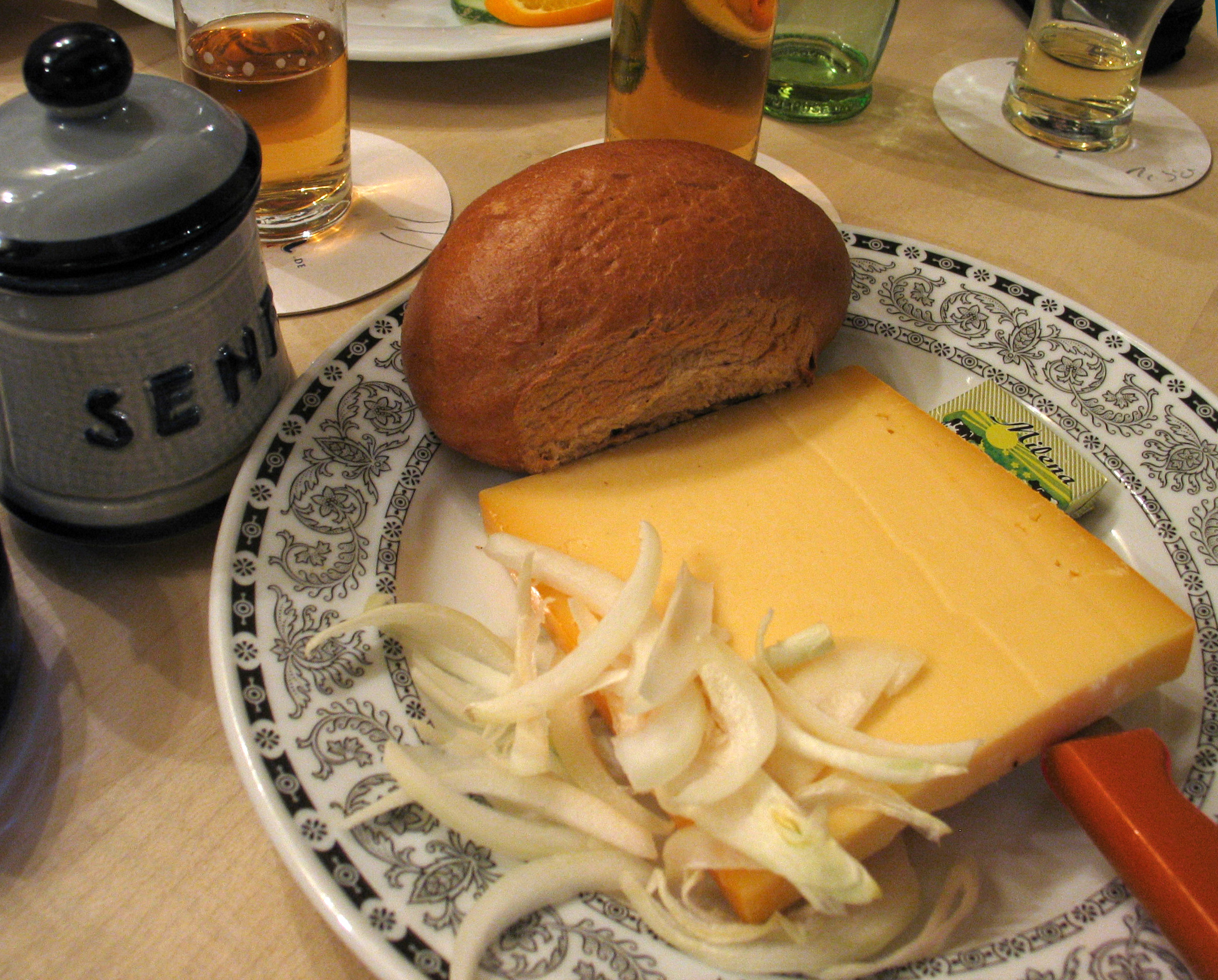
Halve Hahn (Röggelchen with medium-old Gouda cheese, Onions and Mustard)

Röggelchen (of German Roggen for rye) is a small double bread roll made from two pieces of dough. Röggelchen are a common speciality in the Rhineland and in eastern Belgium.

The rye content must be at least 50% of the flour. The rye dough consists of a bread roll dough to which rye flour or sourdough is added.

Röggelchen are usually offered for sale in pairs. They are baked in a pair and then broken in two, so that the contact point is open. The rustic bread roll is baked vigorously, which makes the browning very dark. It is quite common for the tan to turn black.

Cologne's speciality Halve Hahn is prepared with Röggelchen. The Röggelchen is often eaten with a glass of Altbier or a glass of Kölsch.
