= Marraqueta =

Bolivian and Chilean bread roll

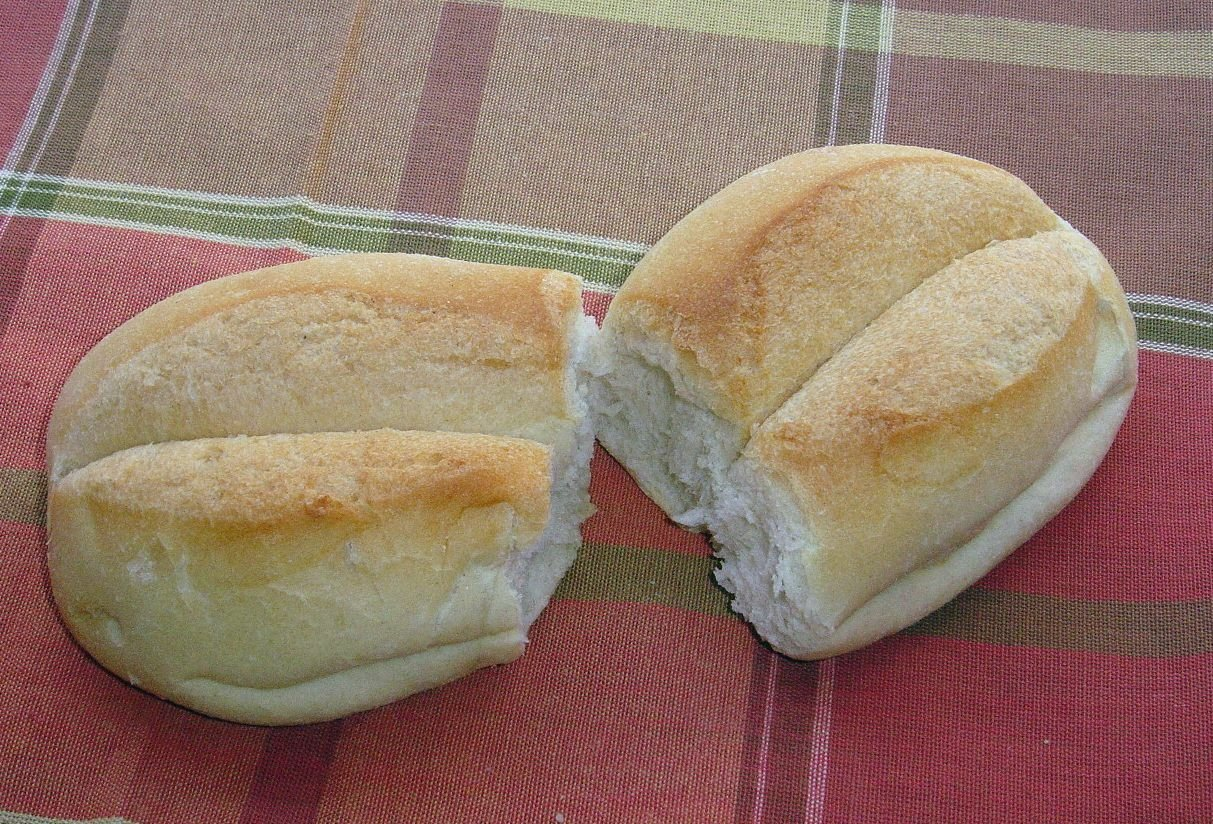
- Chilean marraqueta
- Alternative names: marraqueta; (See below)
- Type: Bread roll
- Place of origin: Chile. Distribution: South America; Bolivia; Chile
- Associated cuisine: Chile, Bolivia
- Main ingredients: Wheat flour, salt, water, leavening agent
- Food energy (per 100 g serving): 267 kcal (1,120 kJ)

A marraqueta (also known by other names) is a bread roll made with wheat flour, salt, water and yeast.

This type of roll has a crusty exterior. In Chile, the bread dates to the 1800s. It is served for breakfast, lunch, and dinner and is the most common bread found in Bolivian bakeries.

In 2024, marraqueta was listed as the third best bread in the world by Taste Atlas.

== Regional varieties ==
=== Bolivia ===
The Bolivian marraqueta is consumed mostly in the metropolitan area of La Paz and El Alto. It is prepared in common ovens between midnight and dawn to be sold fresh and crunchy by vendors in the morning.

The marraqueta of La Paz, also known as marraqueta paceña, was declared cultural patrimony in 2006.

=== Chile ===
In Chile, marraqueta is a staple food eaten at every meal. Marraqueta is the most widely consumed bread in Chile and is used as toast, in sandwiches and as a binder for certain recipes such as pastel de carne (meatloaf). It is widely considered a national staple food and important to Chilean national identity. The bread is often consumed for breakfast topped with mashed avocado. The crust is considered the essential element of the bread; when used for sandwiches, the inner dough (the miga) is often scooped out and discarded, leaving the crust to be filled.

It is also called pan batido (whipped bread) or pan francés (French bread) depending on the region. The Chilean marraqueta is created by butting two rolls up against one another and slicing through both almost deeply enough to form four rolls, then baking.

Chilean marraqueta bread can be divided into four pieces with the hands. It does not contain fat and the proofing process takes longer than other breads. The unusual form of the four buns allows it to be divided very easily.

Many historians agree that the marraqueta originated in Valparaíso, Chile, in the late 19th and early 20th centuries, when major Chilean ports such as Valparaíso and Talcahuano received thousands of European immigrants. The story goes the bread was invented by two French baker brothers in Valparaíso whose last name was Teran-Marraquett, and the bread went on to become very popular among Chileans in a very short time. This story would explain both the marraqueta and pan francés names. In Valparaíso itself, somewhat confusingly, marraqueta means the four small rolls while half of this is called pan batido, the use of which is a shibboleth of the Port of Valparaíso (but is ignored by national supermarket chains). There is no clear agreement on what is considered one unit of marraqueta and while some bakers claim is the four pieces of bread, some others claim that a unit is only half (so they say that the four pieces are two marraquetas).

An alternative theory of the bread's origin was proposed by French naturalist and botanist Claude Gay, who suggested that marraqueta was first eaten in Chile in the 19th century.

=== Peru ===
In Peru, the bread called pan francés (sometimes pan francés peruano) is different from the marraqueta.

== Gallery ==
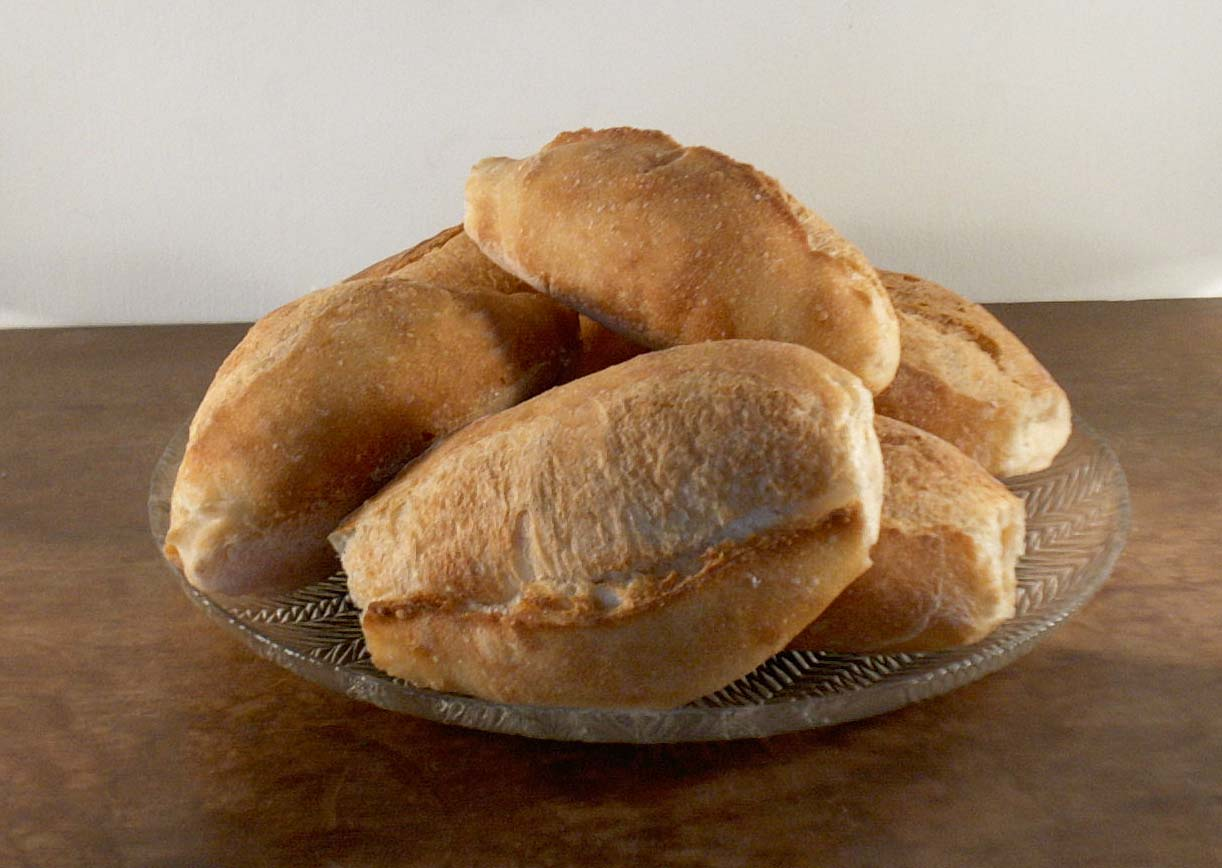
Marraqueta paceña (La Paz-style marraqueta)

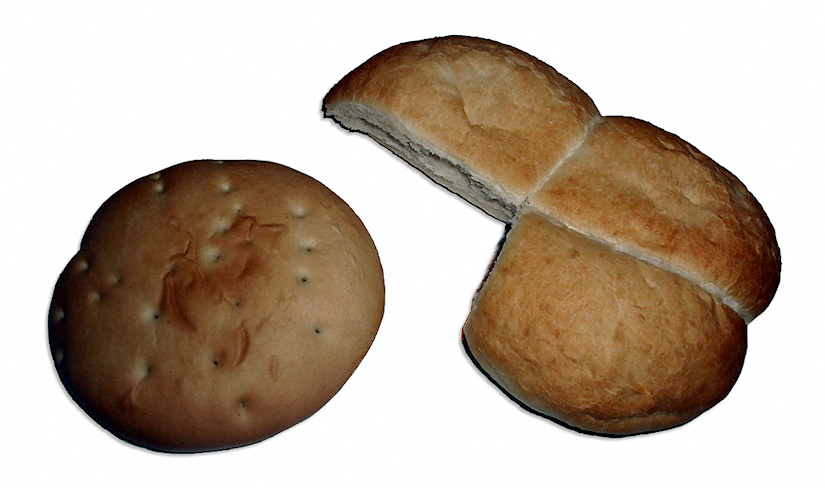
Chilean marraqueta

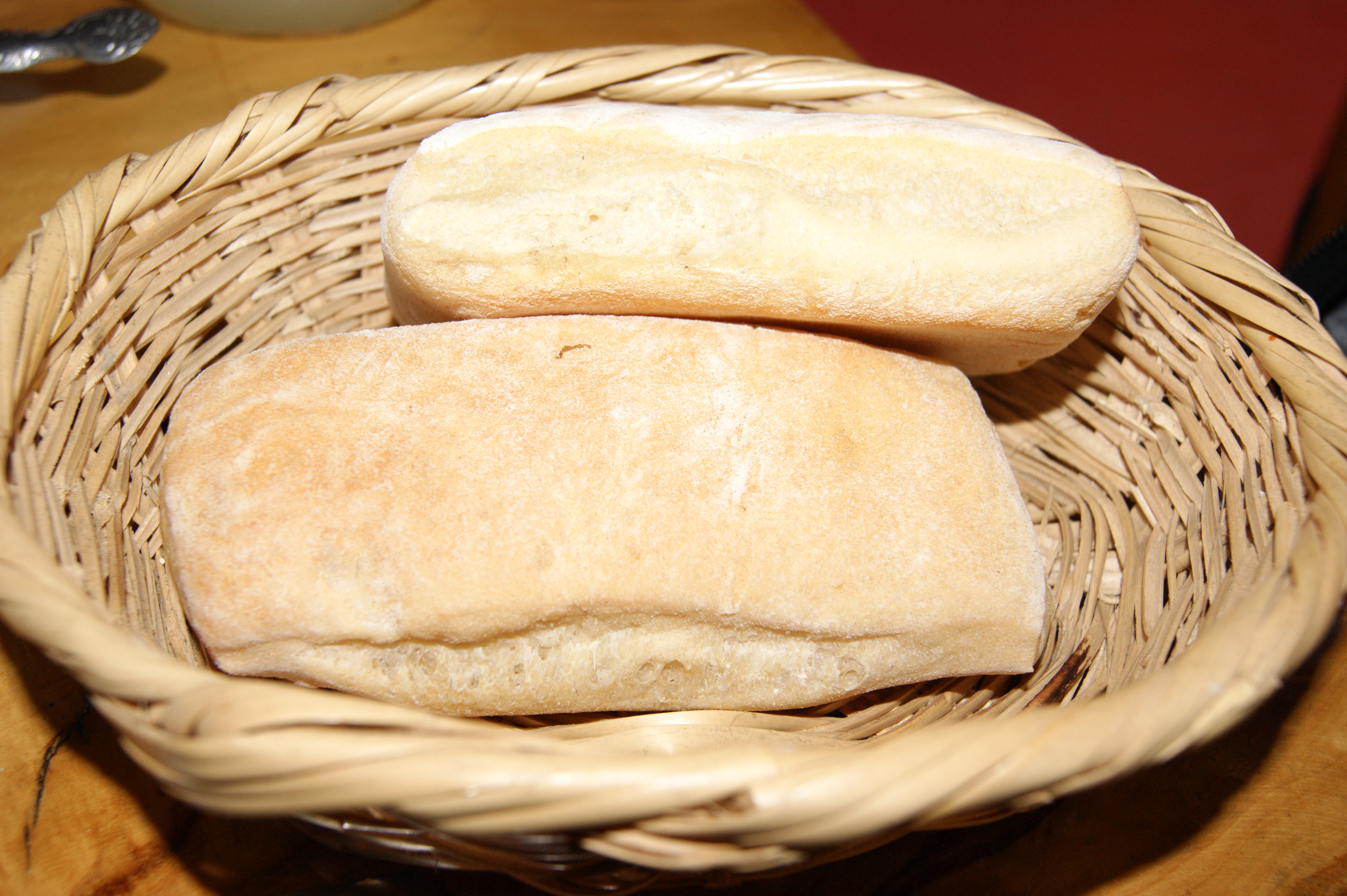
Marraqueta tacneña (Tacna-style marraqueta)

== See also ==
- French roll
- Pão francês
- List of breads
