= Pistolet (bread) =

Belgian round bun

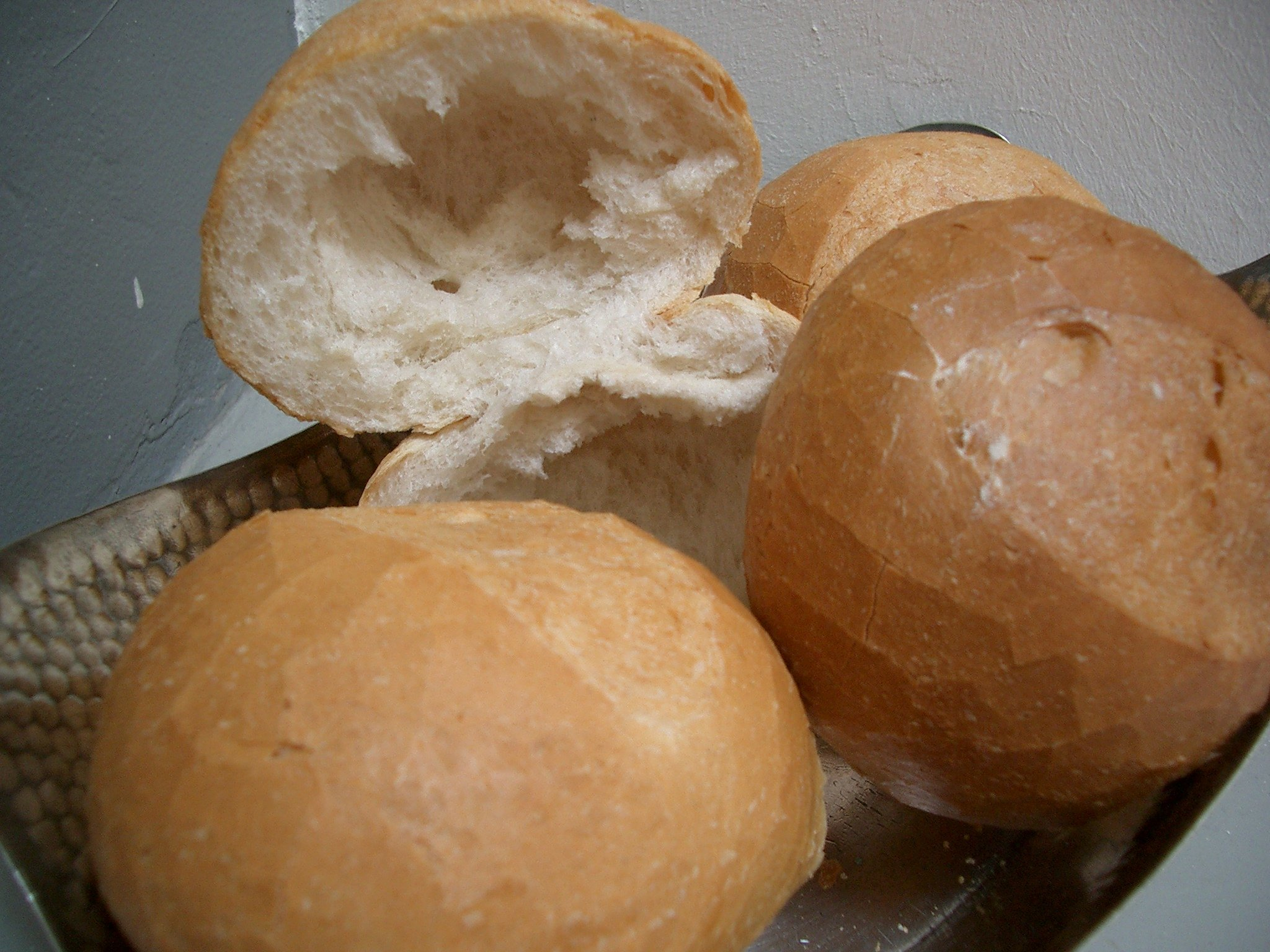
Pistolets.

The pistolet (literally "little pistol") is a typical Belgian variety of bread consisting of a small and round bread roll.

The crust is usually hard and crispy, while the inside of the roll is soft.

To make the bread roll, the dough must rise for 12 hours, and is also manipulated with a small stick. The bread should be light, airy and delicate on the inside, with a crisp crust. The pistolet roll is filled with a typical selection of meats, cheeses and condiments, which may include: cervelas sausages, boudin sausages, Ardennes ham, the Plattekaas cheese of Walschot, Ghent mustard, pickles, mayonnaise, local shrimp, farm butter, Red Flanders beef, kipkap (a kind of head pressed jelly), potjesvlees (meat in gelatin), Pipe d’Ardennes sausages, Bloempanch (black sausage obtained from pig blood), Herve raw milk cheese, and more. It might also be eaten with butter and jam for weekend breakfasts.

While most people in Belgium are familiar with this puffy roll with a slit down the middle and characteristic crisp crust, the truth is that it did not always have this form. The pistolet evolved over several centuries.

In 1852, French poet Gérard de Nerval extolled the pistolet roll of Brussels in his writing. Today, however, while similar breads can be found commonly, only a few bakers in Brussels still make the pistolet according to tradition, with the long rising time and filled with local ingredients.

== Etymology ==
There are many ideas about the origin of the name of this product. One is that it derives from the Latin pistor meaning "miller", which by semantic shift in the Middle Ages came to mean "baker". The diminutive pistolet indicates the product of the baker. Others argue that the name comes from the fact that these rolls, subject to a high taxation in the 17th century, cost almost a "pistol" (a form of currency at the time), and were so nicknamed pistooltje. This is thought unlikely, however, as a pistol was equal to ten or eleven livre, which would have been a very high price for bread.

According to Maurice Piron, a philologist from Liège, the common connection between the pistolet as a weapon, currency and bread is the concept of smallness.

== See also ==
- French roll
- List of bread rolls
