= Pane ticinese =

Swiss white bread

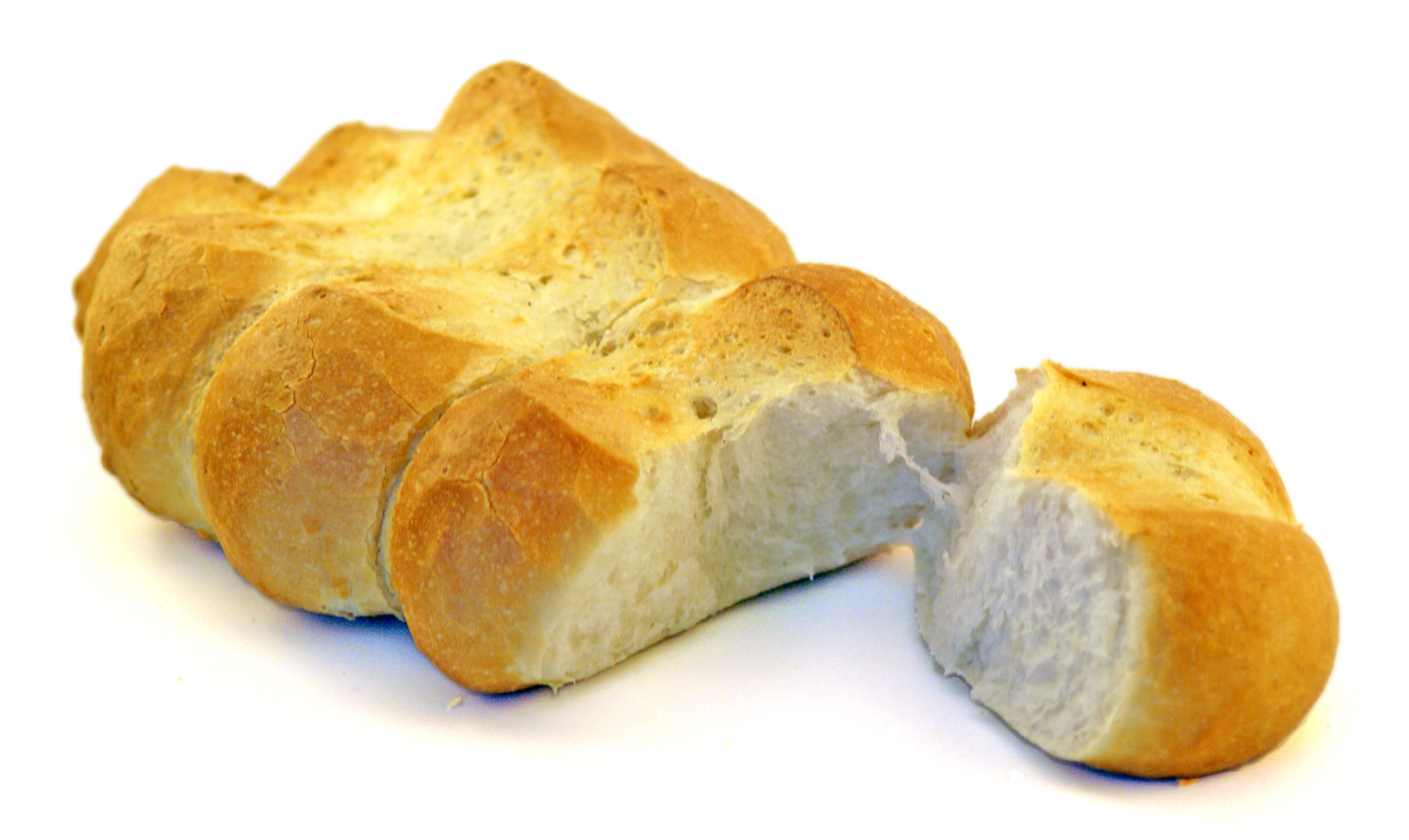
- Type: Bread
- Place of origin: Switzerland
- Region or state: Ticino
- Main ingredients: White flour, water, biga, salt, oil

The pane ticinese (Italian pronunciation: [ˈpane titʃiˈneze]) is a white bread traditionally made in the Swiss canton of Ticino, but also available in the rest of Switzerland, where it is known as "Bread of Ticino" (German: Tessinerbrot [tɛˈsiːnɐˌbʁoːt], French: pain tessinois [pɛ̃ tɛsinwa]). In Ticino, it is referred to by a number of names specific to the region, including pane riga, reale or lireta.

The bread is distinguishable by its shape—it is composed of several small loaves or rolls made to be broken off by hand—and by the addition of oil to the dough, which makes the bread particularly soft.

== History ==
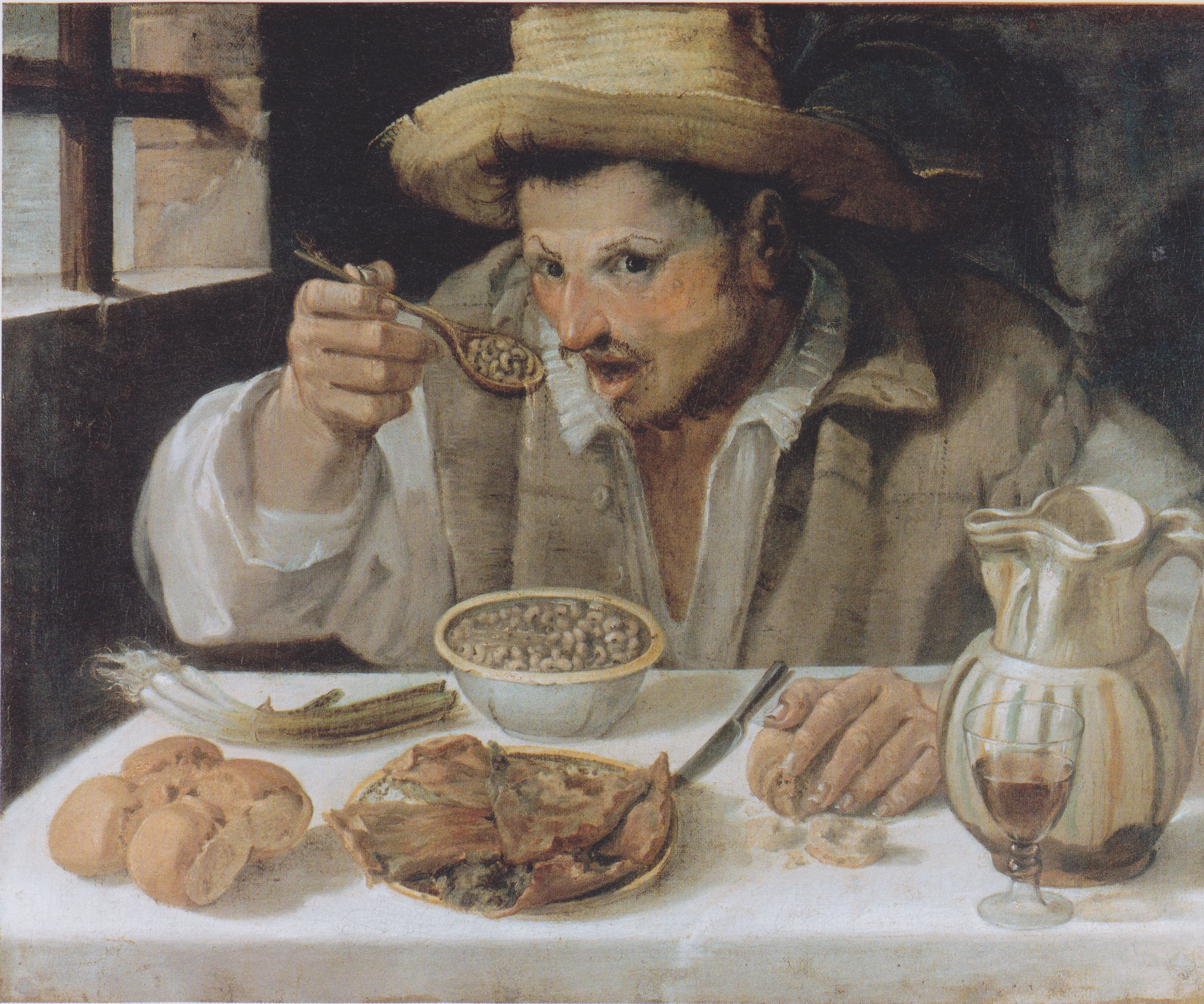
A similar bread depicted in The Beaneater by Annibale Carracci, 1584.

Up until the early 20th century, pane ticinese and other white breads were luxury foods that most Ticinesi could not afford; bread made from rye or chestnut flour was the usual fare in the Ticino mountain villages.

The 1930s book Atlas of Swiss Folklore notes that the white bread made in the Ticino is distinguished from other breads by its Reihenform, or sequential form: it is composed of a number of small loaves attached to each other that are intended to be broken off by hand. One of its names in a local dialect, riia pan ("bread in a line") reflects this shape. This shape of bread was originally brought to Ticino from Italy, where it has been known for a long time. A 1584 painting by the Italian artist Annibale Carracci depicts a man eating at a table and, to his right, a bread very similar to pane ticinese.

According to the Atlas of Swiss Folklore, the Pane ticinese of that time weighed 1 kilogram (2 lb) and was composed of eight loaves; it was sold whole or in parts (one half, a quarter, one eighth or one sixteenth), which were easily produced by breaking individual loaves off the bread.

The bread was made popular in the rest of Switzerland in the 1950s by the Swiss Bakers' Association, whose professional school at Richemont in Lucerne developed a range of specialty breads based on the baking traditions of each canton.

== Preparation ==
Pane ticinese is made of a dough of water, white flour, biga (a mixture of flour, yeast and water), salt, and (in the contemporary recipe only) some oil, such as olive oil. After being kneaded, the dough is divided into round pieces of about 2 kg, which are left to rise for a few minutes before being re-kneaded, flattened and formed into small individual loaves, or michette (plural of michetta). Each michetta is shaped by hand into an oval shape of about 10 cm in length, and attached to other michette to form a complete loaf.

After being brushed with egg, the loaves are again allowed to rise until their volume has doubled, then baked for about 20 to 25 minutes at a temperature of 190 °C (374 °F), until the crust is a golden brown.

== Use ==
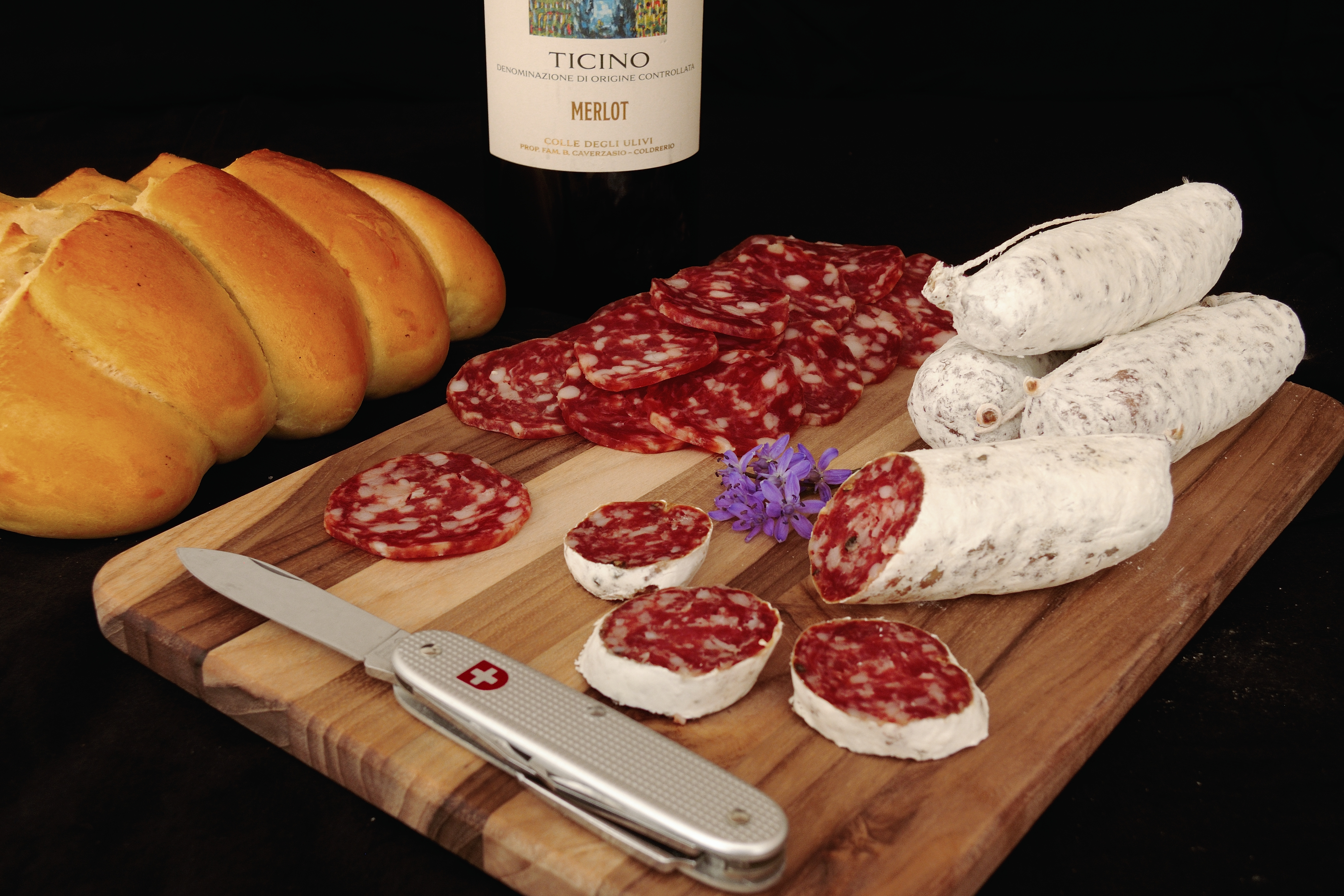
With Salame ticinese

Pane ticinese is enjoyed as a bread for everyday use. Available in most Swiss bakeries and supermarkets, it is typically sold as a composite loaf of four to six pieces weighing 250 grams, with an overall length of 20 to 25 centimeters. When stale, it is used in Ticino to make torta leventinese, a form of bread pudding.

== Bibliography ==
- Gemnetti, Giacomo, Villaggi di Leventina, Società ticinese di scienze naturali, Bellinzona, 1939.
- Tomarkin, Percin, Intorno al problema del pane, Arti grafiche Grassi e Co., Bellinzona, 1935.
- Solci, Guglielmo, Storia sociale dell'alimentazione in Ticino, Masco Consult, Lugano, 1995.
- Bolla, Ines, Donne ticinesi: rievocazioni, La Scuola, Bellinzona, 1928.
- Beretta, Gaetano, Pane e panificazione nella storia: schizzo storico, Tip. Leins e Vescovi, Bellinzona, 1951.
- Bolla, Guido, Aspetti di vita Montana, Tipografia ed., Lugano, 1935.
- Lucchini, Mario, Alimentazione nella Leventina dell'Ottocento, 1992, n° 82.
- La panetteria svizzera, Lucerna, Scuola professionale Richemont, 1983.

== See also ==
- Culinary Heritage of Switzerland
