= List of Icelandic desserts =

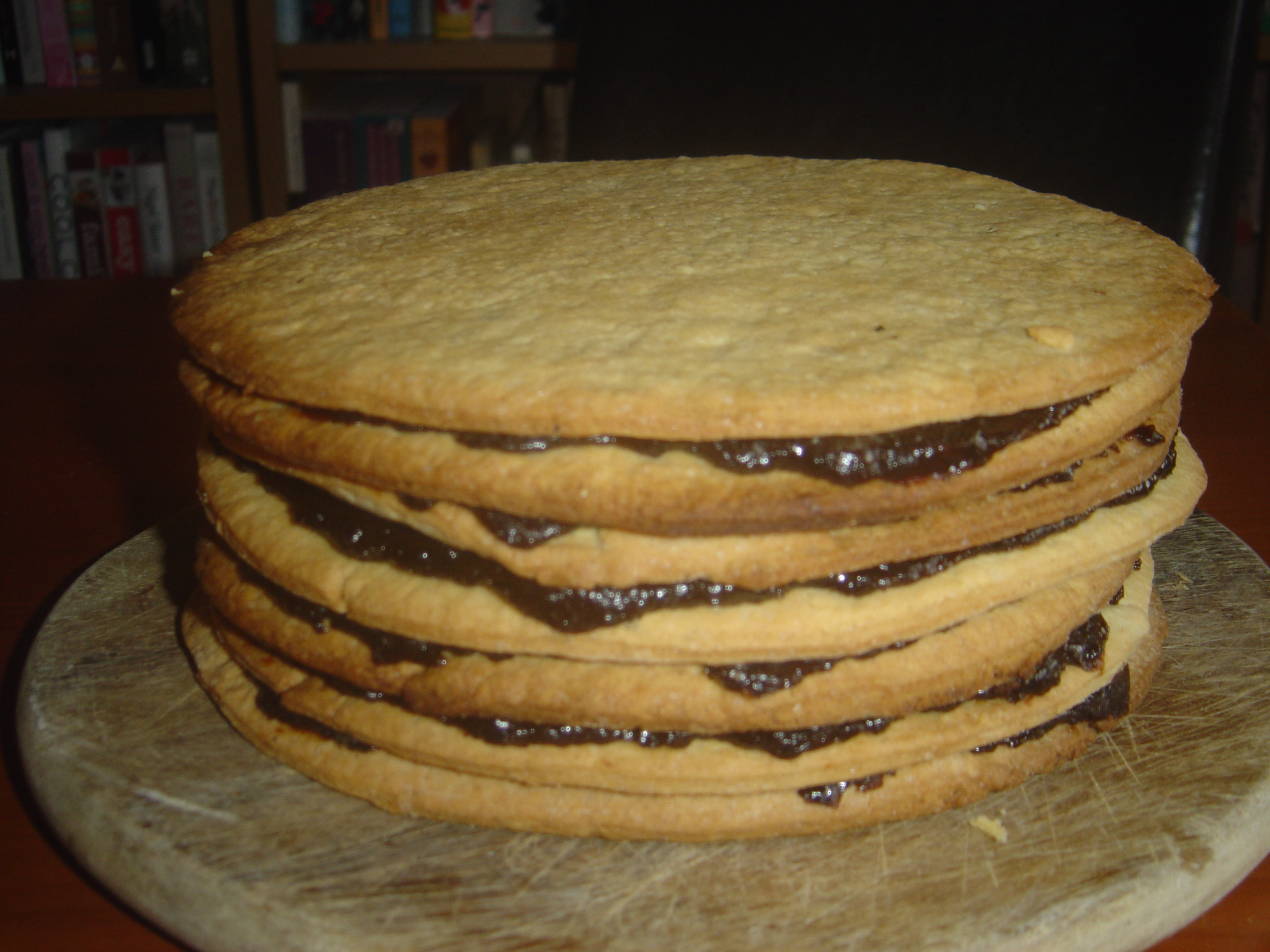
Vínarterta, an Icelandic layer cake featuring plums and cream

This is a list of notable Icelandic sweets and desserts. The cuisine of Iceland refers to food preparation originating from Iceland or having played a great historic part in Icelandic cuisine. Iceland also shares many dishes and influences with surrounding Scandinavian countries, such as Norway, Sweden, and Denmark.

== Characteristics ==
Due to Nordic settlements in Iceland during the 9th century, Scandinavia has a heavy influence in Icelandic cuisine. The earliest published Icelandic cookbooks were collections of Danish recipes brought by Danish bakers and traders—many of which still hold up in Icelandic dining today.

The climate of Iceland is harsh and frigid, therefore the culture relies heavily on animal products rather than large-scale crop farming. This is reflected in their desserts, as most dishes, such as skyr and súkkulaði, feature a dairy component. This is also reflected in the fruits used in dessert preparation, as only fruits that can grow in such a climate can be featured, such as crowberries, blueberries, and rhubarb. While cereals and grains are used in dishes, they are mainly created using imported grains, and therefore have become more popular as trade in Iceland has improved.

== Icelandic desserts ==
Name	Image	Description
Kleina		Sweetened fried rolls cut into a trapezoidal shape using a kleinujárn
Ástarpungar		Translates to "love balls"—fried dough balls filled with raisins and cardamom
Hjónabandsæla		Lattice pastry interwoven with a thick, blueberry paste
Aðalbláber og Rjómi		Blueberries with cream and sugar
Nammi		Bulk confectionary, otherwise known as pick n' mix
Ís		Icelandic ice cream, usually served in different flavors
Bragðarefur		Mixture of ice cream and multiple toppings
Snúður		Cinnamon roll topped with melted chocolate
Skúffukaka		Thin chocolate cake topped with melted chocolate and shredded coconut
Randalín		Layer cake with different portions of sponge cake, icing, and jam
Vínarterta		A type of randalin with layers of plums
Laufabrauð		Thin fried pastry with cut designs
Jólagrautur		Rice pudding topped with raisins, cinnamon, and sugar, typically served during Christmas
Piparkökur		Glazed ginger cookies
Icelandic cheescake		Cheesecake made with skyr
Lakkrístoppar		Meringue cookies filled with chocolate and liquorice
Hjónabandssæla (Marriage Cake)		Cake made with base of oatmeal and flour, filled with rhubarb jam
Möndlukaka		Almond cake with strawberry jam
Ábrystir		Cream pudding made from colostrum
Kakósúpa		Chocolate soup made from milk, dark chocolate, cinnamon, and potato scratch, served warm
Rúlluterta		a rolled cake filled with buttercream
Pönnukökur		Crépe-like pancakes dusted with sugar
Vínarbrauð		Long, flaky pastry, occasionally iced or topped with nuts

== Gallery ==
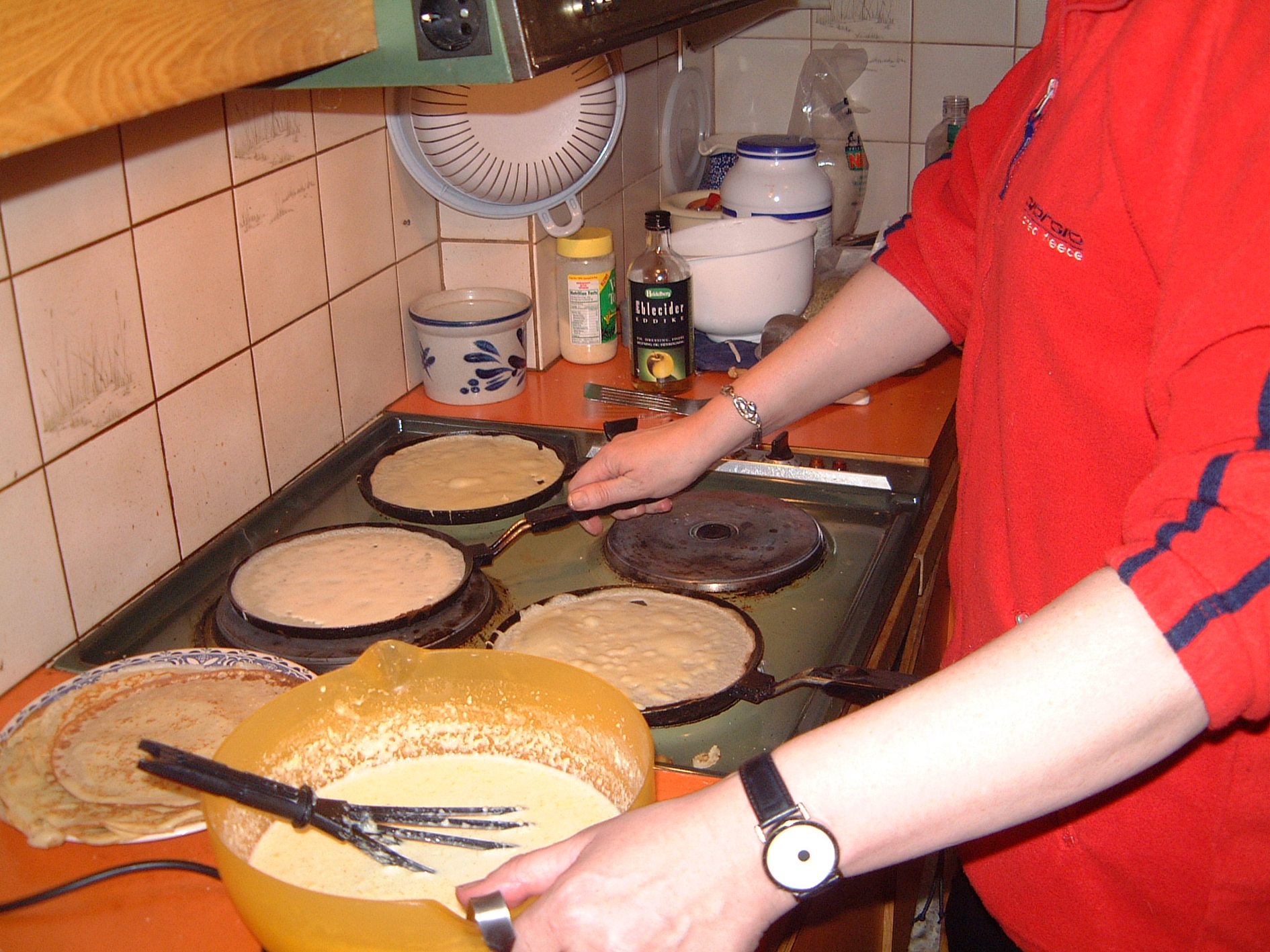
Preparing pönnukökur

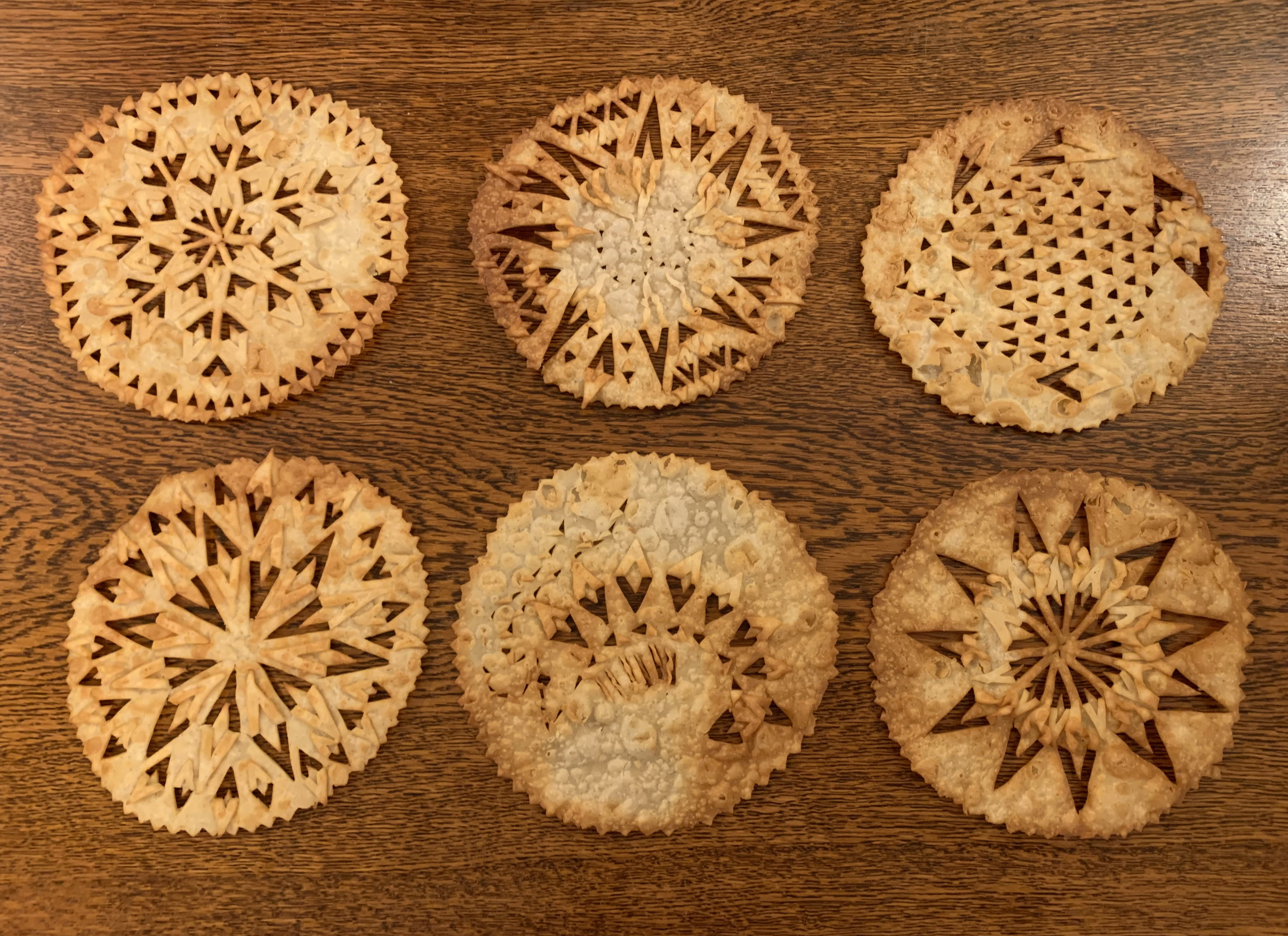
Different laufabrauð designs

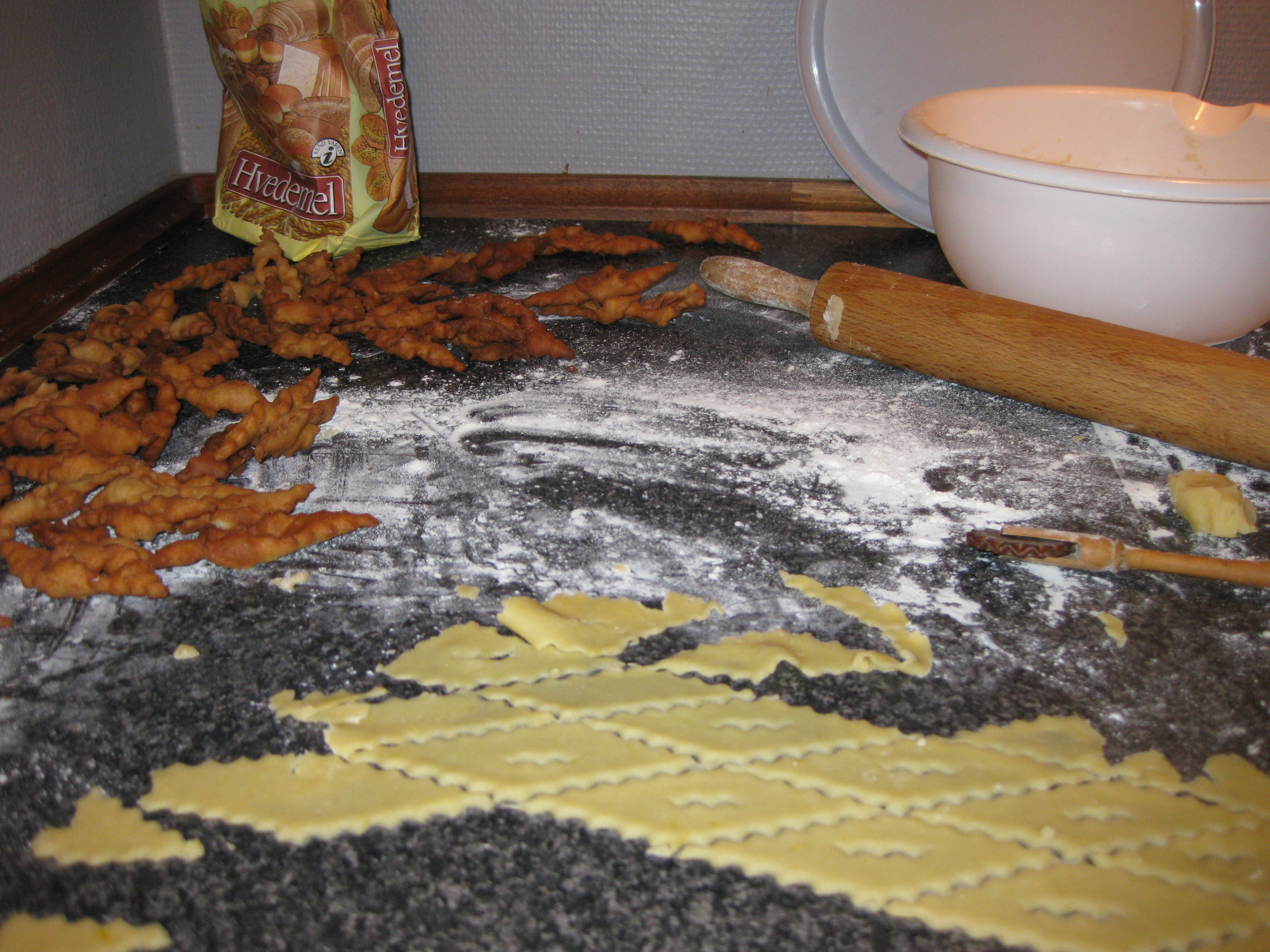
Preparation of kleina

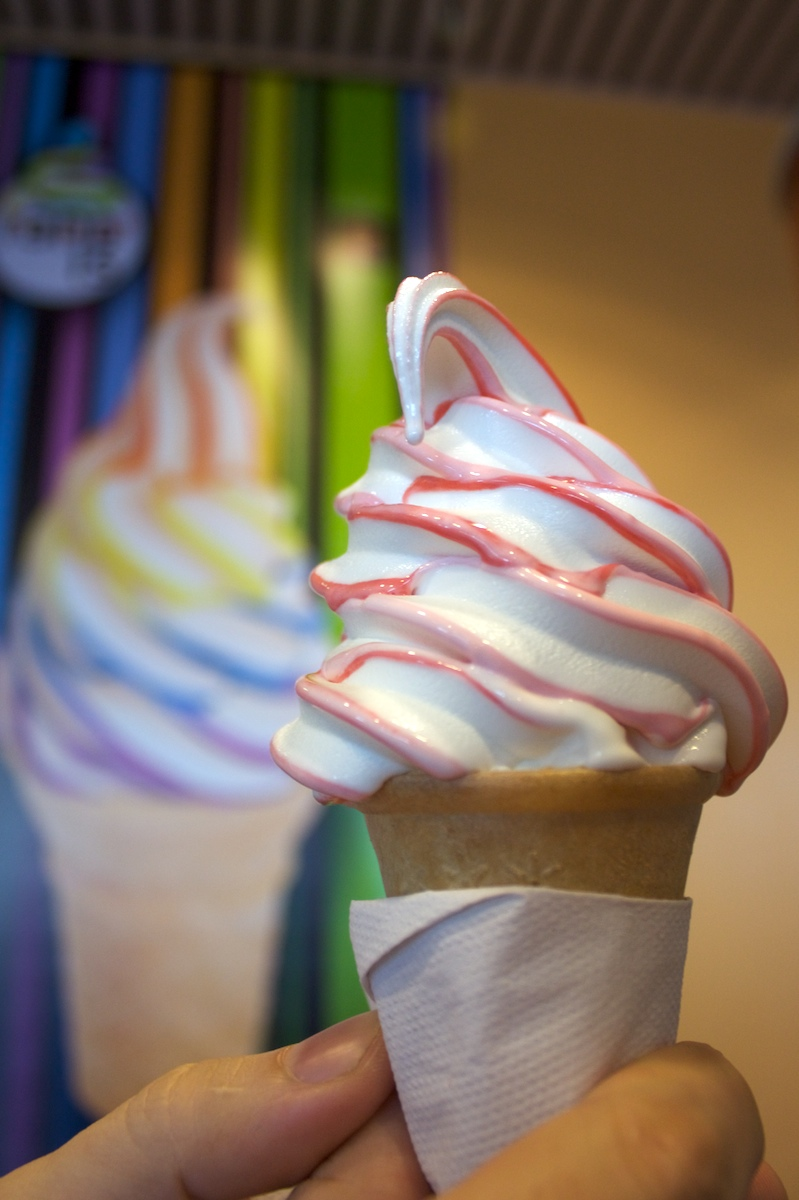
Ice cream served in a cone

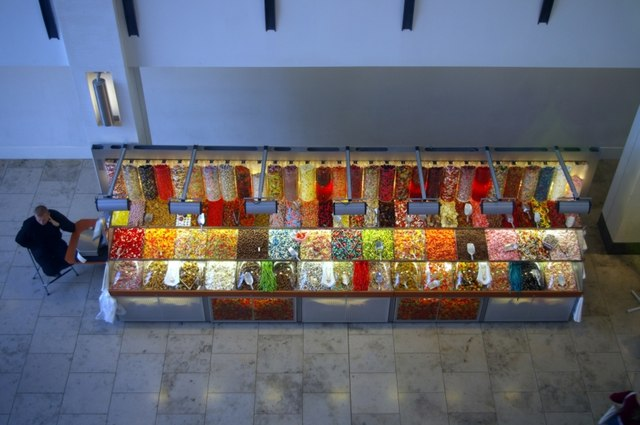
Pick N' Mix stall

== See also ==
- Icelandic cuisine
- List of desserts
