= Icelandic cuisine =

Culinary tradition

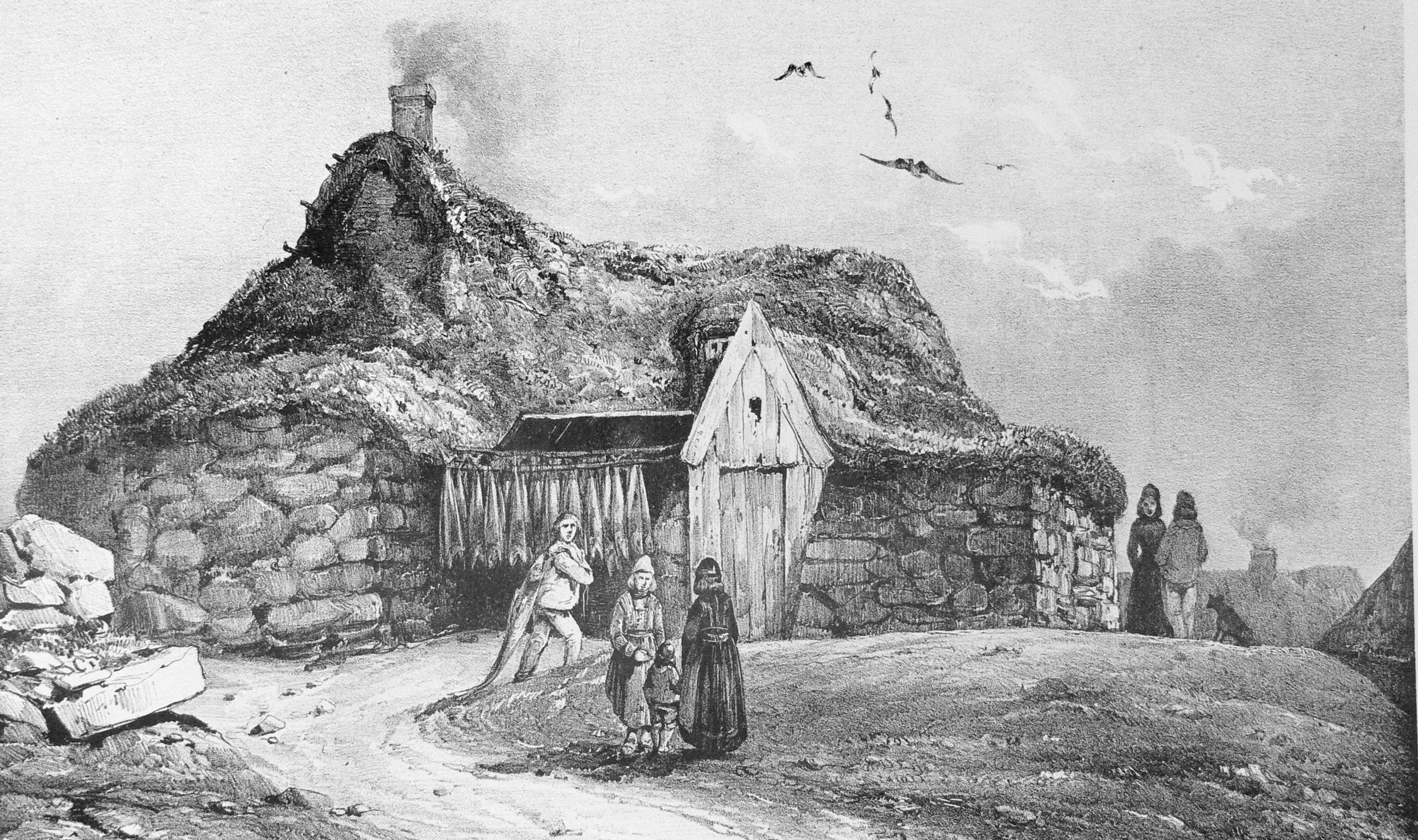
A fisherman's hut in Reykjavík in 1835 with fish hung outside for drying. Wind-dried fish remains popular in Iceland.

The cuisine of Iceland has a long history. Important parts of Icelandic cuisine are lamb, dairy, and fish, the latter because Iceland has traditionally been inhabited only near its coastline. Common foods in Iceland include skyr, hangikjöt (smoked lamb), kleinur, laufabrauð, and bollur. Þorramatur is a traditional buffet served at midwinter festivals called Þorrablót; it includes a selection of traditionally cured meat and fish products served with rúgbrauð (dense dark and sweet rye bread) and brennivín (an Icelandic akvavit). The flavors of this traditional country food originate in its preservation methods: pickling in fermented whey or brine, drying, and smoking.

Modern Icelandic chefs usually emphasise the quality of available ingredients rather than age-old cooking traditions and methods. Numerous restaurants in Iceland specialise in seafood. At the annual Food and Fun chef's competition (held since 2004), competitors create innovative dishes with fresh ingredients produced in Iceland. Points of pride are the quality of the lamb meat, seafood, and, more recently, skyr. Other local ingredients include seabirds and waterfowl (including their eggs), salmon and trout, crowberry, blueberry, rhubarb, Iceland moss, wild mushrooms, wild thyme, lovage, angelica, and dried seaweed, as well as a wide array of dairy products.

Because of the history of settlement in a harsh climate, animal products dominate Icelandic cuisine. Popular taste has been developing, however, to become closer to the European norm. As an example, consumption of vegetables has greatly increased in recent decades while consumption of fish has diminished, yet is still far higher than any other developed country at about quadruple the average.

== History ==
The roots of Icelandic cuisine are to be found in the traditions of Scandinavian cuisine, as Icelandic culture, from its settlement in the 9th century onwards, is a distinctly Nordic culture with a traditional economy based on subsistence farming. Several events in the history of Iceland were of special significance for its cuisine. With Christianisation in 1000 came the tradition of fasting and a ban on horse meat consumption. More significantly in terms of farming and food supply was the onset of the Little Ice Age in the 14th century. Farmers were not able to grow barley anymore and had to rely on imports for any kind of cereal grains. The cooling of the climate also led to important changes in housing and heating: the longhouse of the early settlers, with its spacious hall, was replaced by the Icelandic turf houses with many smaller rooms, including a proper kitchen. This type of dwelling was used well into the 20th century.

Historians often use the Reformation beginning in 1517 as the transition between the Middle Ages and the early modern period in Icelandic history. Farming in Iceland continued with traditional practices from the 14th century to the late 18th century, when reforms were made due to the influence of the Enlightenment. A trade monopoly instituted by the Danish king in 1602 had a certain effect on culinary traditions. But the cuisine of Denmark had the most influence in the 19th century and the beginning of the 20th, when the country had close relations with Iceland. In the early 20th century, an economic boom based on commercial fishing and processing resulted in a slow transition from traditional dairy and meat-based foods to consumption of fish and root vegetables. Preserved foods began to be replaced with greater emphasis on fresh ingredients.

=== Medieval Iceland ===
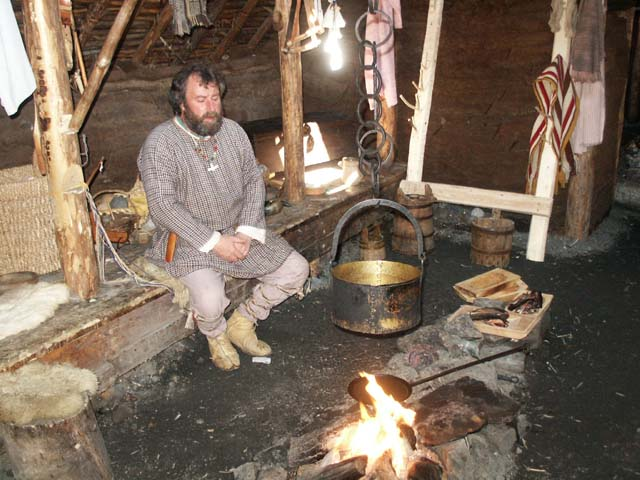
Interior of a recreated medieval longhouse at L'Anse aux Meadows in Newfoundland

When Iceland was settled by immigrants from Scandinavia and Viking colonies in the British Isles, they brought their farming methods and food traditions of the Norse world. Research indicates that the climate of Iceland was much milder during the Middle Ages than it is now, and sources tell of cultivation of barley and oats. Most of this would have been consumed as porridge or gruel or used for making beer. Cattle was the dominant farm animal, but farms also raised poultry, pigs, goats, horses and sheep. The poultry, horse, sheep and goat stocks first brought to Iceland have since developed in isolation, unaffected by modern selective breeding. Therefore, they are sometimes called the "settlement breed" or "viking breed".

==== Preservation methods ====
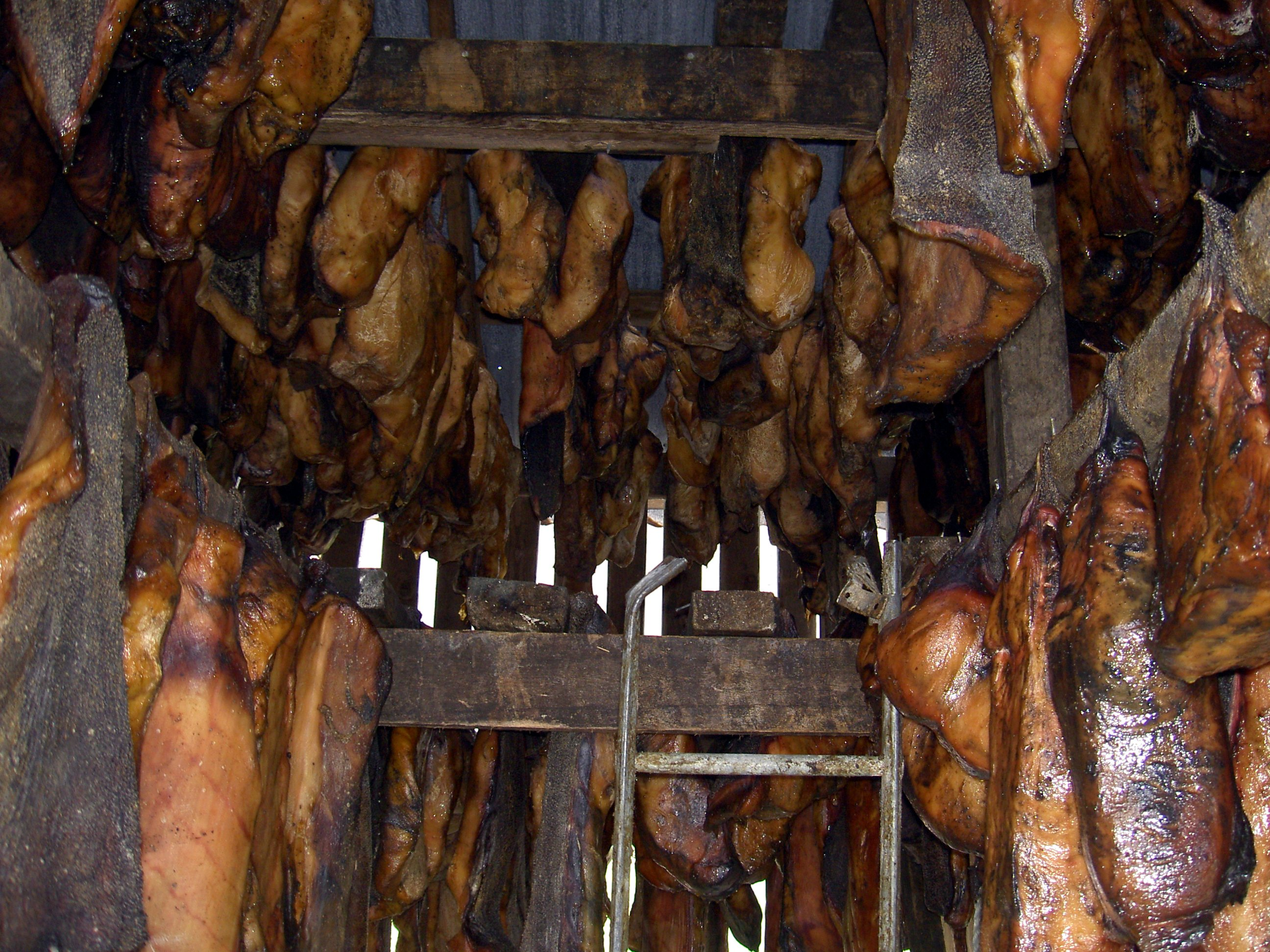
Fermented shark, hákarl, is an example of a culinary tradition that has continued from the settlement of Iceland in the 9th century to this day.

Fish was stored in salt, and before the Black Death, Iceland exported stockfish to the fish market in Bergen. However, salt seems to have been less abundant in Iceland than in Norway. Saltmaking, which was mostly done by boiling sea water or burning seaweed, gradually disappeared when overgrazing caused a shortage of firewood in most parts of the country in the 14th century. Instead of curing with salt, the people of Iceland began to preserve meat in fermented whey. This method was also known from Norway but acquired little significance there.

Archeological digs in medieval farms have revealed large round holes in storage rooms where the barrel containing the lactic acid was kept. Two medieval stories tell of men who saved their lives in a burning house by staying submerged inside the acid barrel. Medieval Icelanders used fermentation for preserving both fish and meat, a method that greatly alters the taste of the food, making it similar to very strong cheese. Fermentation is still used to cure shark (see hákarl), skate and herring. Fermented eggs are a regional delicacy, rarely found nowadays. Smoking and drying meat and fish was also practiced, although the drying of meat was seen as something of a last resort.

==== Cheese ====
Cheese was made from goat and sheep milk as well as cow milk. Skyr, a soft yogurt-like cheese eaten with spoons, was originally a tradition brought to Iceland from Norway. It has survived only in Iceland. The whey left over when making skyr was made to go sour and used for storing meat. It is likely that the predominance of skyr in Icelandic cuisine caused the disappearance of other cheesemaking traditions in the modern era, until industrial cheesemaking started in the first half of the 20th century. Cheesemaking was part of seter-farming (seljabúskapur), living in mountain huts in the highlands in late spring. Here farmers could separate the kids and lambs from their mothers in order to milk the adults. They often made cheese while still in the highlands. Flavors would reflect the new grasses.

==== Cooking and meals ====
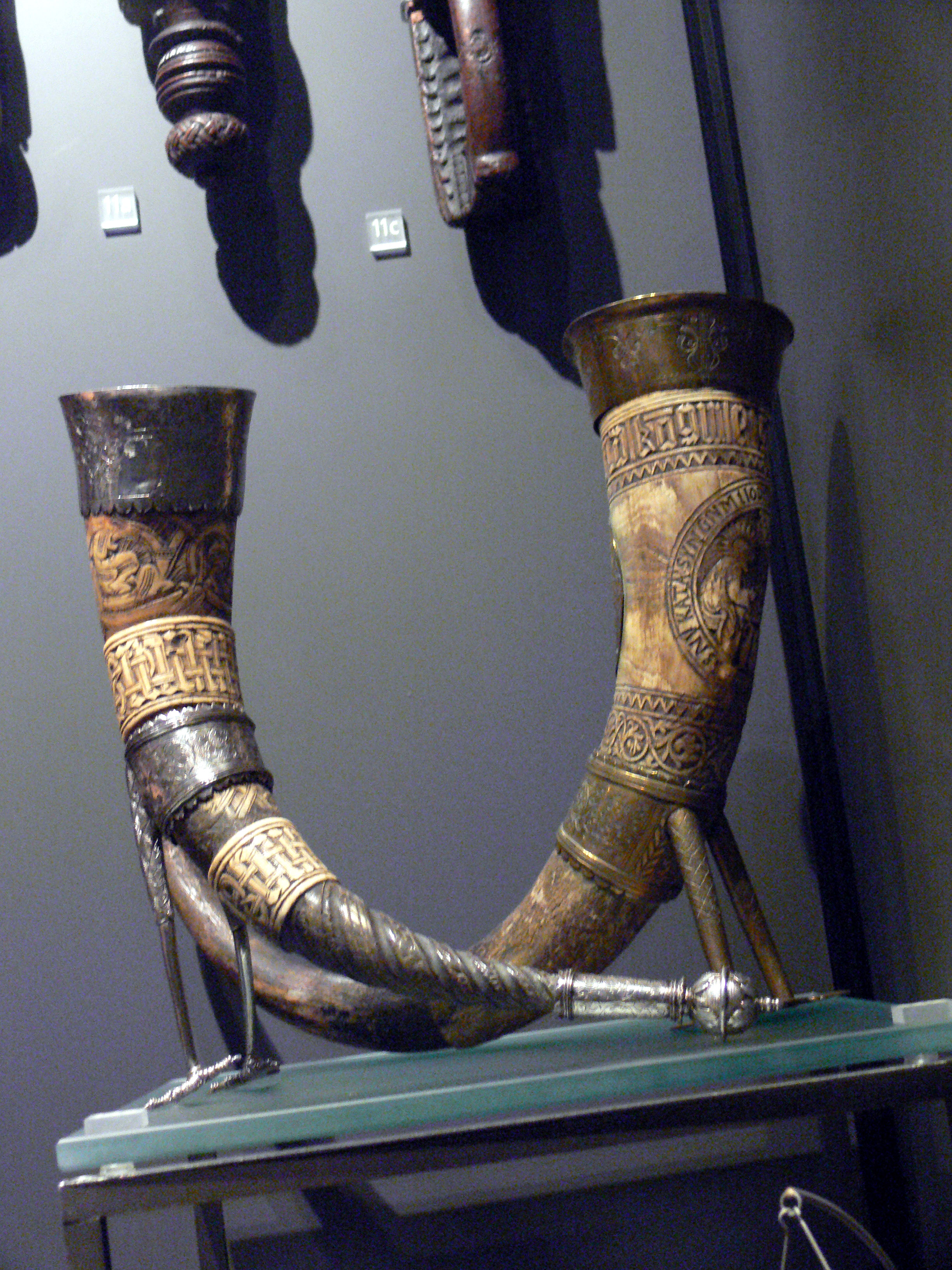
Two Icelandic drinking horns from around 1600 in the Danish National Museum

The longhouses of the first settlers usually included a long fire in the center to warm the house. Around it, holes were dug in the floor to be used as earth ovens for baking bread and cooking meat. Women would place dough or meat in the hole along with hot embers from the fire, and cover it tightly for the time needed. They boiled liquids in wooden staved churns by putting hot stones from the fire directly into the liquid (a practice that continued to the modern age). Low stone hearths surrounded the fire, but mostly the cooking was done on the floor.

In the 14th century, Icelandic turf houses were developed and gradually replaced the longhouses. They had a kitchen with a raised stone hearth for cooking called hlóðir. The cooling of the climate during the Little Ice Age made it impossible to grow barley, and sheep replaced the more expensive cattle as predominant livestock. Iceland became dependent on imports for all cereals. Due to a shortage of firewood, the people turned to peat, dung, and dried heather for fuels.

In medieval Iceland the people ate two meals during the day, the lunch or dagverður at noon, and supper or náttverður at the end of the day. Food was eaten from bowls. Wooden staved tankards with a hinged lid were used for drinking. Later these were developed into bulging casks, called askar, used for serving food. The upper class used elaborately carved drinking horns on special occasions. Spoons were the most common eating utensil, made of horn or bone, and often decorated with carvings. Except for feasts, for which tables would be laid, people ate their food from their laps, while sitting on their beds, which lined the outer wall of the house. In addition to processing crops and meats and cooking, the farmer's wife apportioned the food among the family and friends. In richer households this role was entrusted to a special butler called a bryti.

=== Early modern period ===
Icelandic subsistence farming from the Middle Ages well into the 20th century was restricted by the short production period (summer) compared to the long cold period. Apart from occasional game, the food produced in the three months of summer (including preserving meats and cheeses) had to suffice for nine months of winter. Researchers have estimated that, based on these methods of subsistence, Iceland could support a population of around 60,000. For centuries, farming methods changed very little, and fishing was done by men using hooks and lines from rowboats constructed from driftwood. Farmers also owned the boats, so fishing was limited to periods when the farmhands were not needed for farm work. Fish was not just a food, but a trade good, and it was exchanged for products brought by foreign merchant ships. The people were dependent on trade for cereals, such as rye and oats, transported to Iceland by Danish merchants. Until the 19th century, the vast majority of Icelandic farmers were tenant farmers on land owned by the Icelandic landowner elite, the Catholic church, or (especially after the confiscation of church lands during the Reformation) the king of Denmark. Tenant farmers used surplus fish, tallow, and butter to pay the landowner his dues.

Considerable regional variation in subsistence farming developed according to whether people lived close to the ocean or inland. Also, in the north of the country, the main fishing period coincided with the haymaking period in the autumn. This resulted in underdevelopment of fishing because labor was devoted to haymaking. In the South, by contrast, the main fishing period was from February to July. Some historians have described Icelandic society as a highly conservative farming society. Because of the demand for farmhands in the short summers, tenant farmers and landowners opposed the formation of fishing villages. Fishing was considered risky compared to farming, and the Alþingi passed many resolutions restricting or forbidding landless tenants from living in coastal villages to pursue fishing.

==== Foreign trade ====
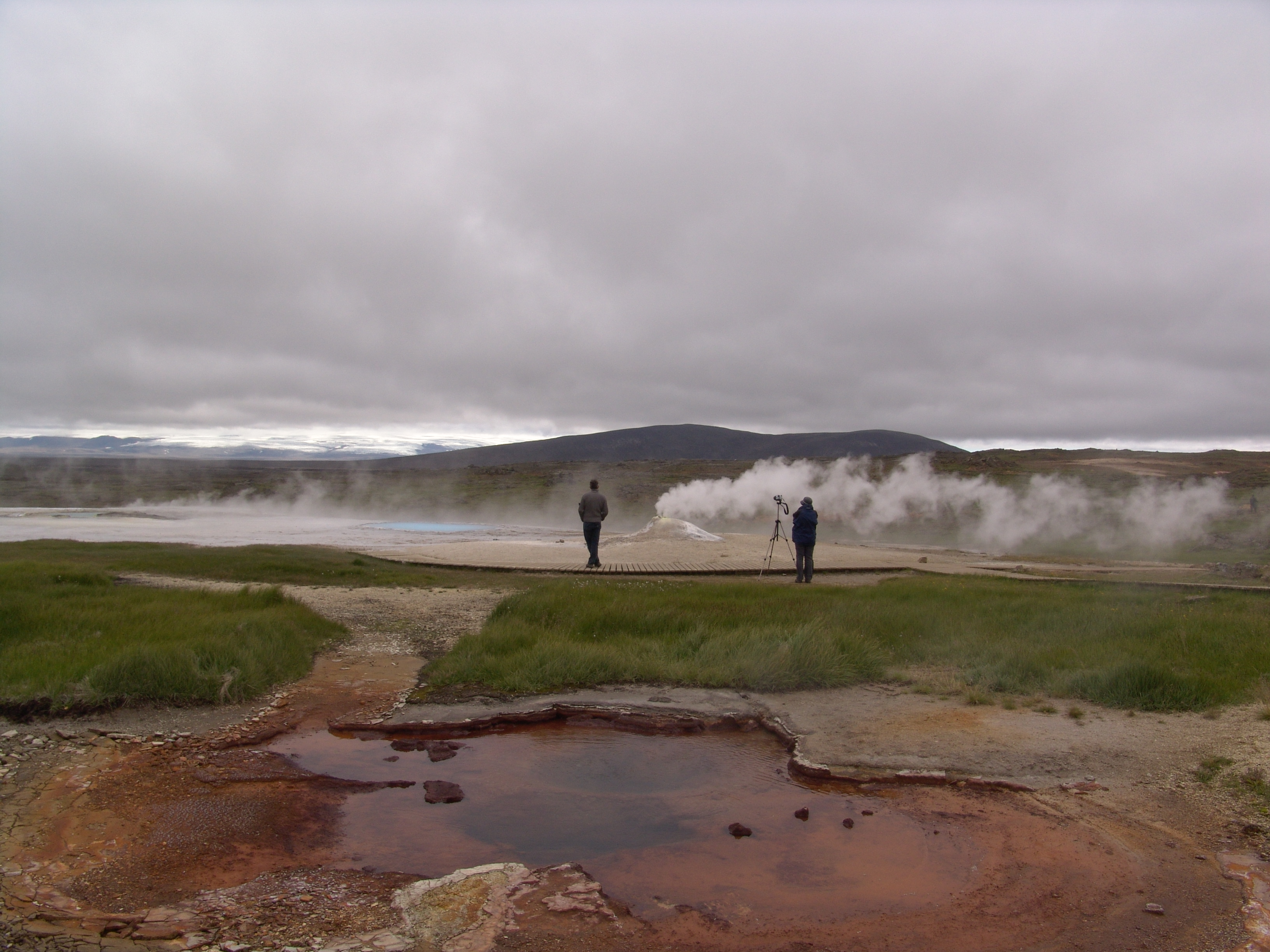
Cooking eggs and small game and even baking in hot springs is a peculiar feature of Icelandic cuisine.

Given the dominance of subsistence farming in Iceland, there was a lack of specialisation and commerce among farms. As testified in some of the Icelandic sagas, domestic trade seems to have been suspect as a type of usury from the age of settlement. Trade with foreign merchant ships was lively, however, and vital for the economy, especially for cereals and honey, alcohol, and (later) tobacco. Fishing ships from the coastal areas of Europe stopped for provisions in Icelandic harbors and traded what they had with the local people. This would include stale beer, salted pork, biscuits, and chewing tobacco, sold for knitted wool mittens, blankets, etc. Merchant ships put in occasionally from Holland, Germany, England, Scotland, Ireland, France and Spain, to sell their products, mainly for stockfish. A ship is prominently displayed in the royal seal of Iceland.

In 1602 the Danish king, worried about the activities of English and German ships in what he considered to be territorial waters, instituted a trade monopoly in Iceland, restricting commerce to Danish merchants. They were required to regularly send merchant ships to Iceland carrying trade goods needed by the country. While illegal trade flourished in the 17th century, from 1685 the government instituted stricter measures to enforce the monopoly. It flourished until 1787. As a result, Iceland farmers grew a type of rye predominant in Denmark, and brennivín, an akvavit produced from rye, was introduced. These products displaced other cereals and beer.

==== Cereals ====
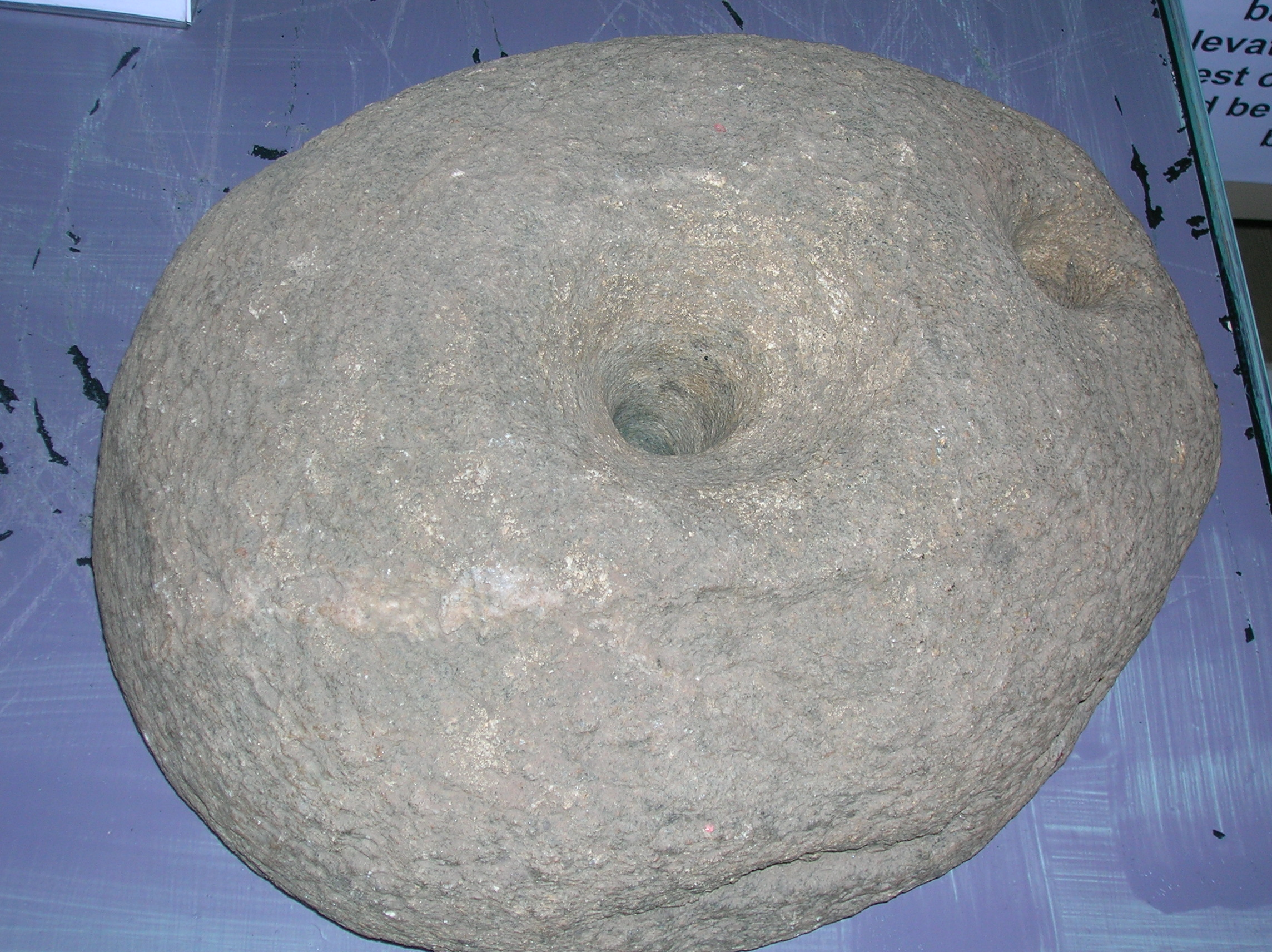
A quern-stone from Scotland. Similar stones were used in Iceland for grinding corn into flour.

Different types of bread were considered a luxury among common people, although they were not uncommon. Corn bought from the merchant would be ground using a quern-stone (called kvarnarsteinn in Icelandic) and supplemented with dried dulse (seaweed) and lichens. Sometimes it was boiled in milk and served as a thin porridge. The porridge could be mixed with skyr to form skyrhræringur. The most common type of bread was a pot bread called rúgbrauð, a dark and dense rye bread, reminiscent of the German pumpernickel and the Danish rugbrød, only moister. This could also be baked by burying the dough in special wooden casks in the ground close to a hot spring and picking it up the next day. Bread baked in this manner has a slightly sulphuric taste. Dried fish with butter was served with all meals of the day, serving the same purpose as the "daily bread" in Europe.

==== Cooking and meals ====
From the 14th century, food was prepared in the kitchen on a raised stone hlóðir or hearth. Hooks were placed above in order to hold the pots at the desired height above the fire. Ovens were rare, as these required much firewood for heating. Baking, roasting and boiling were all done in cast iron pots, usually imported.

The two meals of the medieval period were replaced by three meals in the early modern period; the breakfast (morgunskattur) at around ten o'clock, lunch (nónmatur) at around three or four in the afternoon, and supper (kvöldskattur) at the end of the day. In the Icelandic turf houses people ate sitting on their beds, which lined the room. Food was served in askar, low and bulging wooden staved casks with a hinged lid and two handles, often decorated. Spoon food was served from the cask, and dry food placed on the open lid. Each household member had a personal askur for eating from and was responsible for keeping it clean.

=== Modernity ===
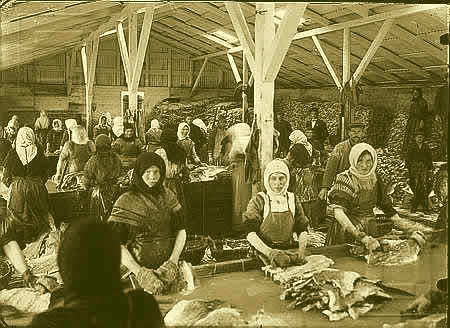
Women producing stockfish for export in Reykjavík in the 1910s.

Móðuharðindin, arguably the greatest natural disaster to have hit Iceland after its settlement, took place in 1783. Ten years earlier, a ban on Danish merchants residing in Iceland had been lifted and five years later the trade monopoly was ended. Some of the Danish merchants became residents, and some Icelanders became merchants themselves.

During the Napoleonic Wars (1803–1815), there was a shortage of trade goods as merchant ships were diverted by war. Forced into self-reliance, Icelanders began to emphasize production and consumption of local vegetables raised during the short growing season. In the 19th century, nationalism and schools for women were influential in formalising traditional methods and shaping modern Icelandic cuisine.

==== Danish influence ====
The first written cookbooks to be published in Icelandic were collections of Danish recipes published in the 18th century. They were intended to introduce the upper-class cuisine from Denmark-Norway to their peers in Iceland. The recipes sometimes had a "commoner version", using less expensive ingredients for farmhands and maids. The cuisine of Denmark influenced Iceland well before that through trade.

In addition, Danish merchants who settled in Iceland, after the ban was lifted in 1770, often ran large households characterised by a mixture of Danish and Icelandic customs. Reykjavík, which developed as village by the end of the 18th century, began to grow and became a center of a melting pot of Icelandic and Danish culinary traditions. Fishing villages formed in the 19th century, many located by the trading harbours, which previously had featured little more than a natural harbour and a locked warehouse nearby. The Danish influence was most pronounced in pastry-making, as there were few native traditions in this craft. Ethnic Danish bakers began to operate around the start of the 20th century in both Reykjavík and Akureyri. Some Danish pastry-making traditions have survived longer in Iceland than in Denmark.

==== Vegetables ====
In the late 17th century, some farmers cultivated the first vegetable gardens, but growing vegetables did not become common until the early 19th century, when the Napoleonic Wars resulted in the merchant ships staying away. Resident Danes, who brought the tradition of vegetable gardens with them, were usually the first to start growing vegetables. Common early garden vegetables included hardy varieties of cabbage, turnip, rutabaga, and potato. They were generally prepared in Iceland as boiled accompaniments to meats and fish, and sometimes mashed with butter.

==== Girls' schools ====
In the first half of the 20th century, many home economics schools, intended as secondary education for girls, were instituted around Iceland. Within these schools, during a time of nationalistic fervor, many Icelandic culinary traditions were formalised and written down by the pupils. They were published in large recipe compendia a few years later. Later emphasis on food hygiene and the use of fresh ingredients was a novelty in a country where culinary traditions had been based on preserving food for long-term use.

The modern economy began to expand, based on commercial export of seafood. The modern generation rejected many traditional foods, embracing the concepts of "freshness" and "purity" associated with ingredients from the sea, especially when marketed abroad. During the urbanisation boom of the late 1940s, many Icelanders formed regional associations in Reykjavík. As fraternites, they revived some old culinary and other rural traditions. These associations organised midwinter festivals, where they started serving "Icelandic food", traditional country foods served in a buffet. This was later called Þorramatur.

==== The cooperatives ====
In the beginning of the 20th century, farmers living near the towns would sell their products to shops and directly to households, often under a subscription contract. (This is similar to the concept of community-supported agriculture in some United States cities since the late 20th century.) To deal with the Great Depression in 1930, the Icelandic government instituted state monopolies on various imports, including vegetables. They granted the regional farmers' cooperatives, most of them founded around the start of the 20th century, a monopoly on dairy and meat production for the consumer market. This meant that smaller private producers were out of business.

The large cooperatives were believed able to implement economies of scale in agricultural production. They invested in production facilities meeting modern standards of food hygiene. These cooperatives still dominate agricultural production in Iceland and are almost unchallenged. They pioneered new cheesemaking techniques based on popular European varieties of Gouda, blue cheese, Camembert, and others. Cheesemaking (apart from skyr) had been nearly extinct in Iceland since the 18th century. The cooperatives have driven product development, especially in dairy products. For instance, they market whey-based sweet drinks and variations of traditional products. One of these is "Skyr.is", a creamier, sweeter skyr, which has boosted the popularity of this age-old staple.

==== Fishing ====
Fishing on an industrial scale with trawlers started before World War I. Fresh fish became a cheap commodity in Iceland and a staple in the cuisine of fishing villages around the country. Until around 1990, studies showed that Icelanders were consuming much more fish per capita than any other European nation. Since then, however, steeply rising fish prices have caused a decline in consumption.

== Types of food ==
=== Fish ===
Icelanders consume fish caught in the waters of the North Atlantic Ocean. Fresh fish can be had all year round. Icelanders eat mostly haddock, plaice, halibut, herring, and shrimp.

==== Hákarl ====
Hákarl (meaning 'shark' in Icelandic) is putrescent shark meat which has been preserved. It is part of the þorramatur, the traditional seasonal Icelandic foods. It is often accompanied by brennivín, a local schnapps.

=== Meat ===
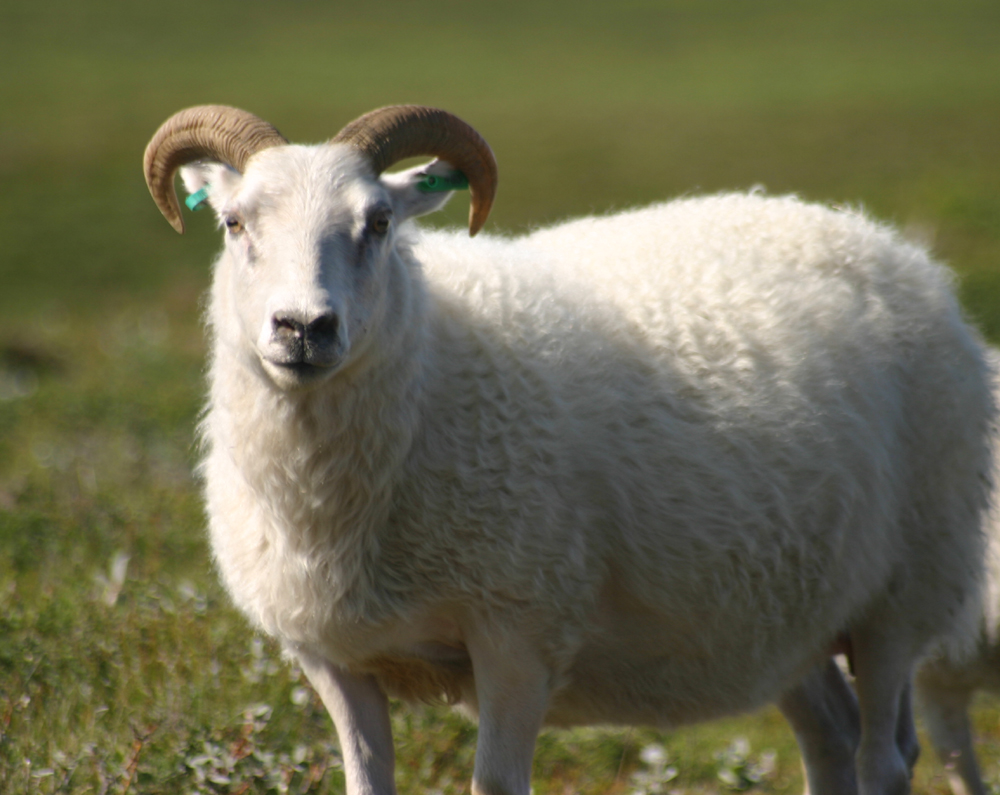
An Icelandic sheep.

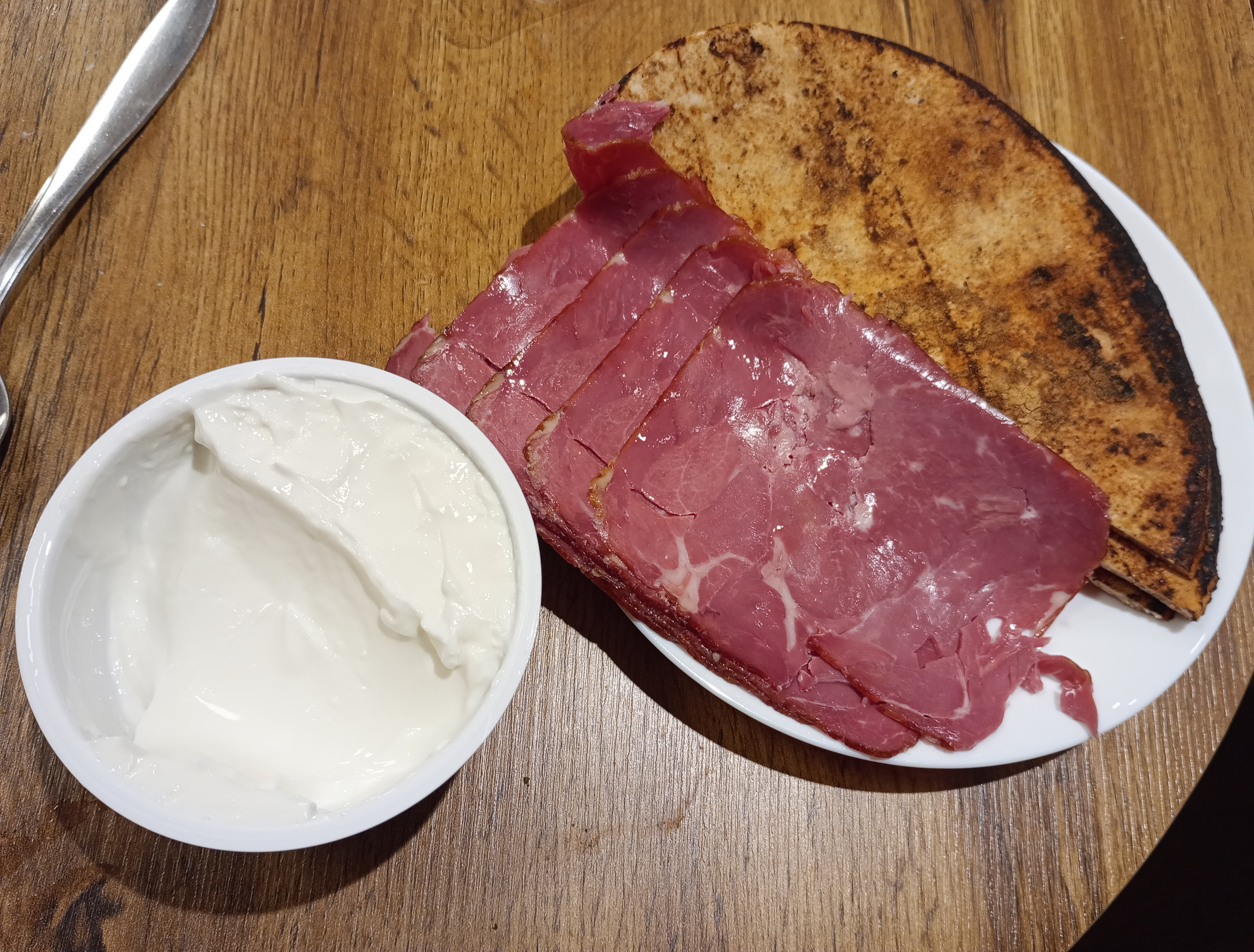
Sliced hangikjöt (smoked mutton) with flatkaka (rye flatbread) and skyr

Traditionally, domestic sheep, the most common farm animal in Iceland, was the primary source of meat. Sheep were also used for their milk and wool, and were worth more alive than dead. When a sheep was slaughtered (usually the young rams and infertile ewes), most or all of the carcass was used for making food, which was carefully preserved and consumed. Traditionally lambs are slaughtered in the autumn, when they are more than three months old and have reached a weight of almost 20 kg. After Christianisation, horses were eaten only as a last resort. After the middle of the 18th century, attitudes changed. Horse meat, usually salted and served boiled or in bjúgu, a form of smoked sausage, has been common in Iceland since the 19th century.

Icelandic beef is usually of top quality with good marbling due to the cold climate. Icelandic cattle are grass-fed and raised without growth hormones and drugs. However, the lack of tradition for eating beef has resulted in sales of lower quality meat, forcing buyers to be careful.

==== Game ====
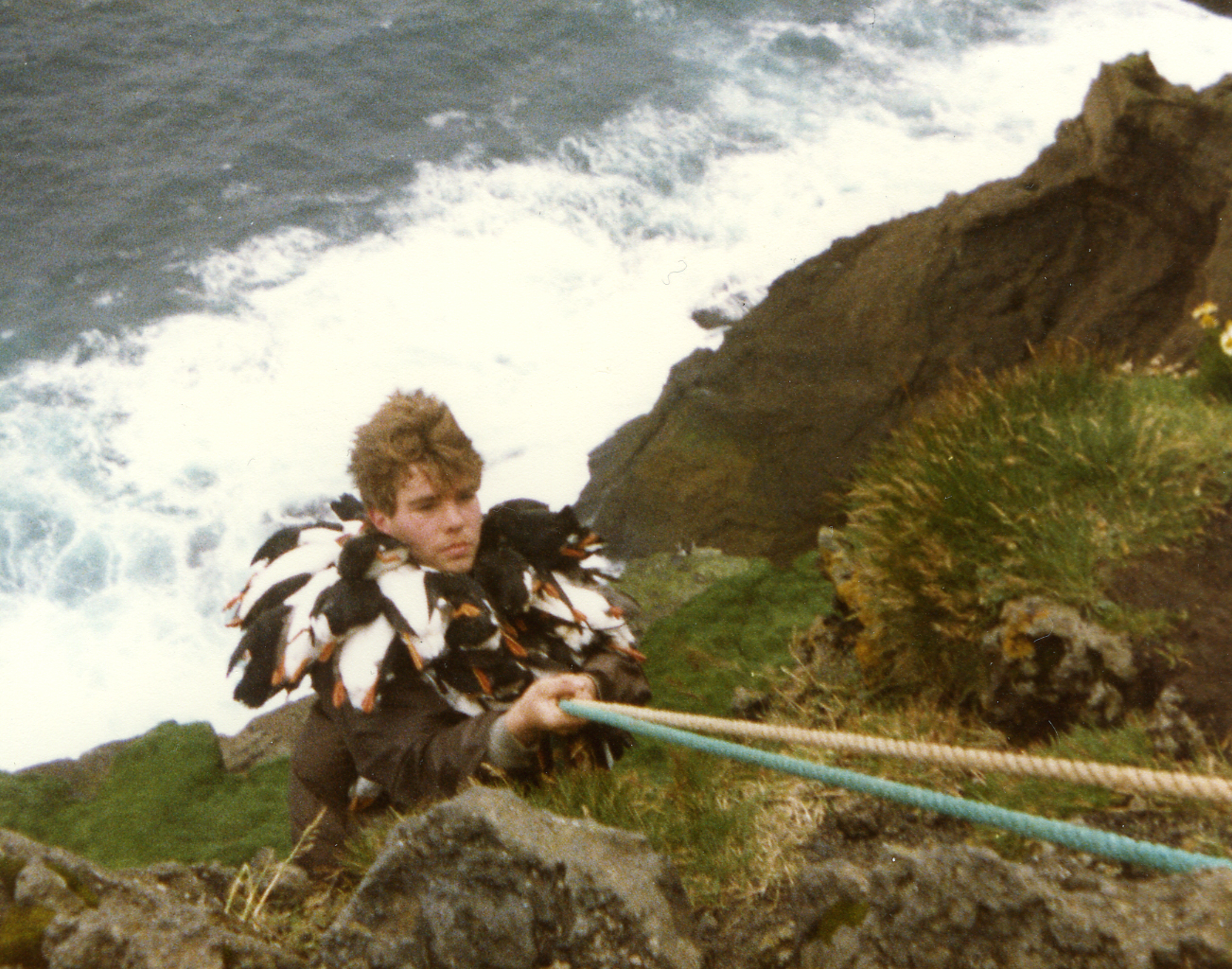
A puffin hunter in Vestmannaeyjar.

Small game in Iceland consists mostly of seabirds (puffin, cormorant and great black-backed gull) and waterfowl (mallard, greylag goose and pink-footed goose). The meat of some seabirds contains fish oil. It is placed in a bowl of milk overnight to extract the oil before cooking. Ptarmigan is also found in Iceland, but hunting of them has been banned because of dramatically declining stocks since the late 20th century. Ptarmigan, served with a creamy sauce and jam, has been a traditional Christmas main course in many Icelandic households.

Seal hunting, especially the more common harbor seal, was common everywhere farmers had access to seal breeding grounds. Seal was considered an important commodity. Whereas mutton was almost never eaten fresh, seal meat was usually eaten immediately, washed in seawater, or conserved for a short time in brine. Seal meat is not commonly eaten anymore and is rarely found in stores.

Systematic whaling was not possible in Iceland until the late 19th century, due to the lack of ocean-going ships. Small whales were hunted close to the shore with the small rowboats used for fishing. Beached whales were also eaten. The Icelandic word for beached whale, hvalreki, is still used to mean a stroke of good luck. When Iceland started commercial whaling (mostly minke whales) in the early 20th century, whale meat became popular as a low-priced red meat. It can be prepared in much the same manner as the more expensive beef. When Iceland withdrew from the International Whaling Commission in 1992, commercial whaling stopped. Some whale meat was still sold in specialised stores, coming from small whales that had beached or been accidentally caught in nets. In 2002 Iceland rejoined the IWC, and commercial whaling recommenced in 2006. Whale meat is commonly available again, although the price has gone up due to the cost of whaling.

Reindeer were introduced in Iceland in the late 18th century and live wild on the moorlands in the eastern farthing. A small number are killed by hunters each autumn. Their meat is sold in stores and prepared in restaurants most of the year. Reindeer meat is considered a special delicacy and is usually very expensive.

==== Limits on meat imports ====
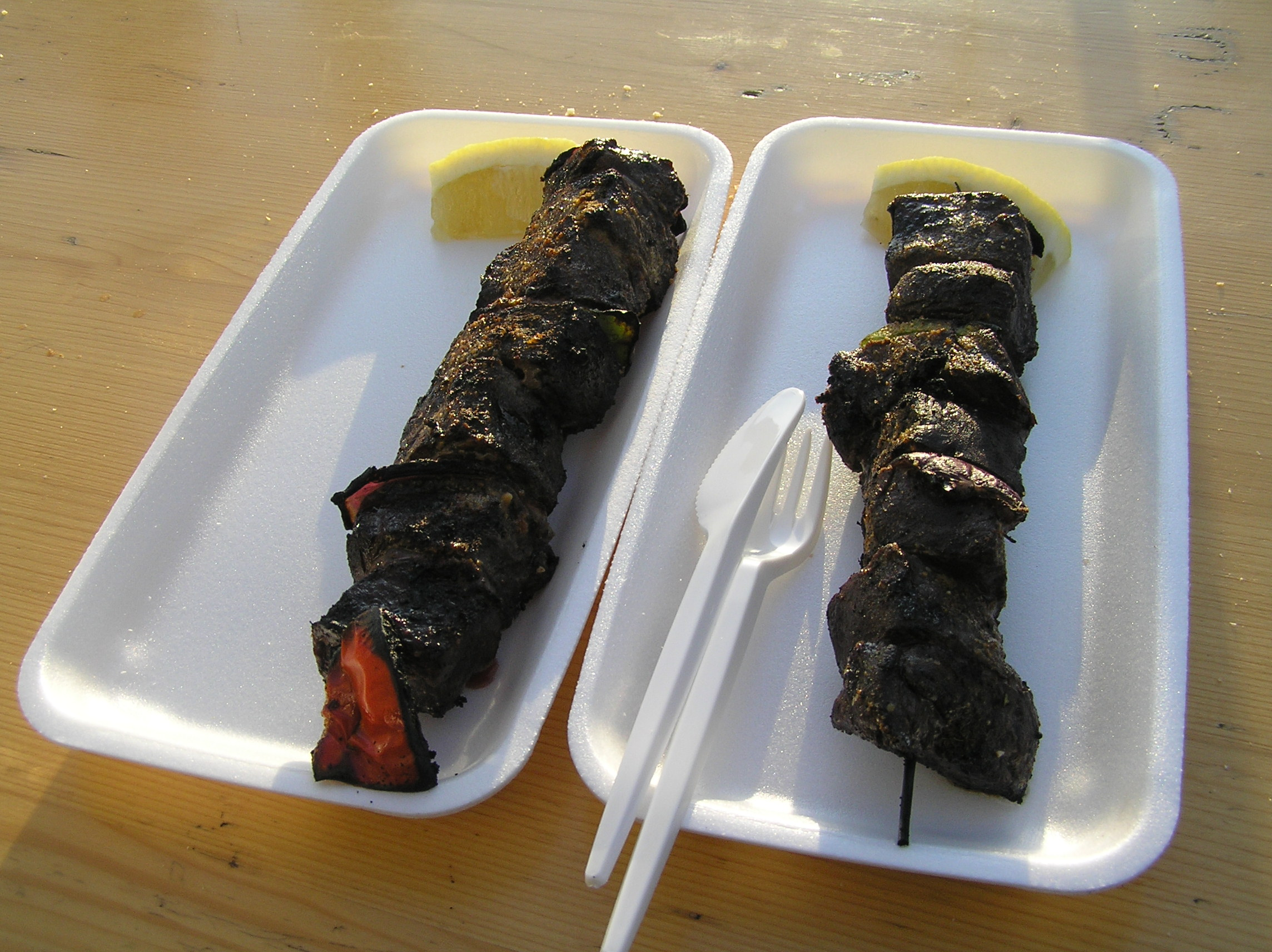
Minke whale on a stick, at the Sea Baron restaurant in Reykjavik Harbour area, Iceland

Importing raw meat to Iceland is strictly regulated and dependent on specific licenses issued to importers. The government has feared contamination. Due to Iceland's isolation, most of the stocks of domestic animals raised in Iceland have no resistance to some diseases common in neighboring countries. For this reason, tourists are banned from bringing in even cured ham or sausage with them; these are confiscated by customs officers.

=== Dairy products ===
Dairy products are very important to Icelanders. The average Icelander consumes about 400 litres (100 US gallons) of dairy products in one year.

=== Fruits and vegetables ===
Vegetable production and consumption is steadily growing, with production going from around 8,000 tonnes in 1977 to almost 30,000 tonnes in 2007. The cold climate reduces the need for farmers to use pesticides. Vegetables such as rutabaga, cabbage and turnips are usually started in greenhouses in the early spring, and tomatoes and cucumbers are entirely produced indoors. Iceland relies on imports for almost any type of sweet fruit except for berries. Since the early 20th century, it has again been possible to grow barley for human consumption in a few places, for the first time since the Middle Ages.

=== Bread and pastry ===
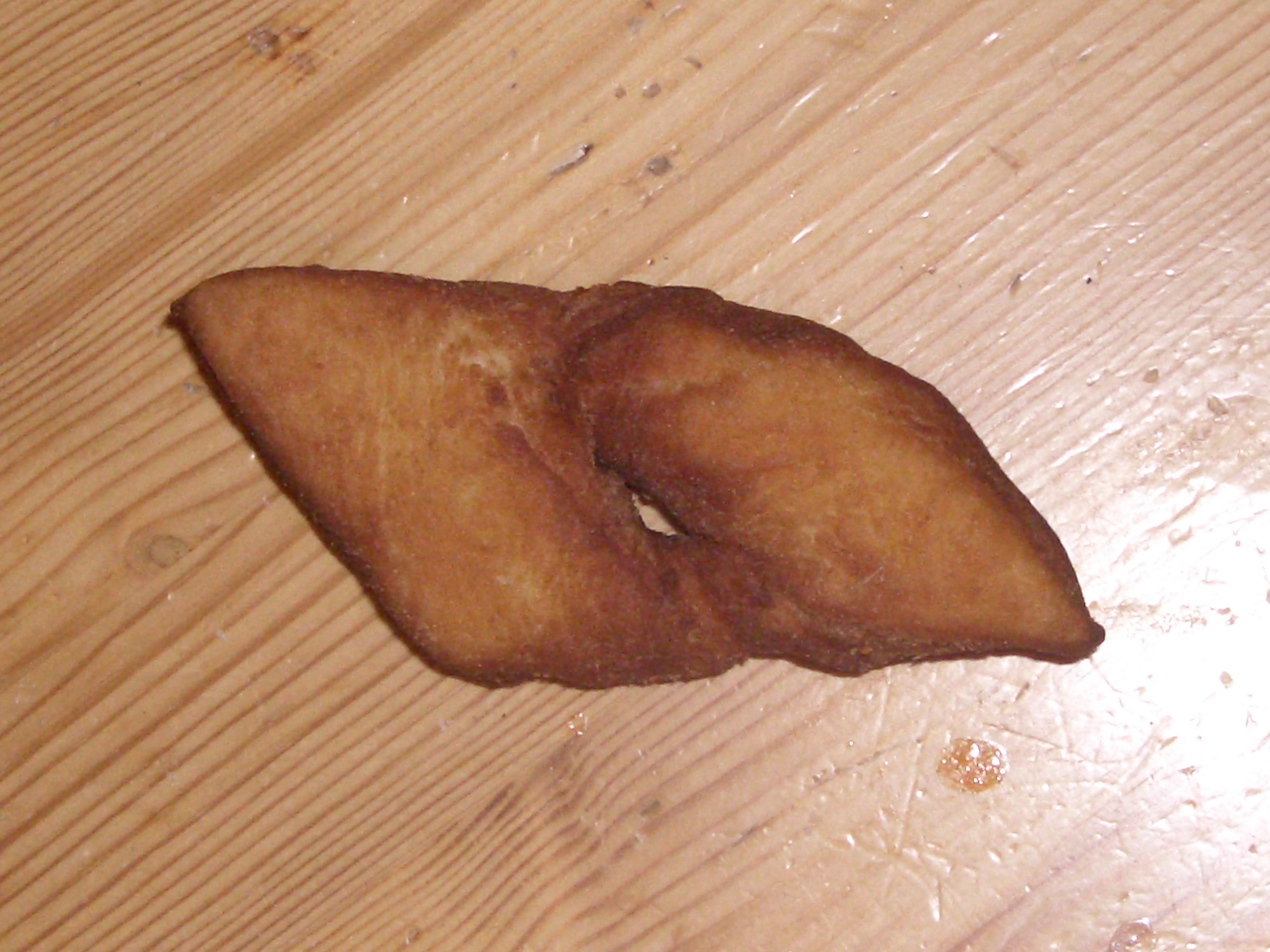
Kleina

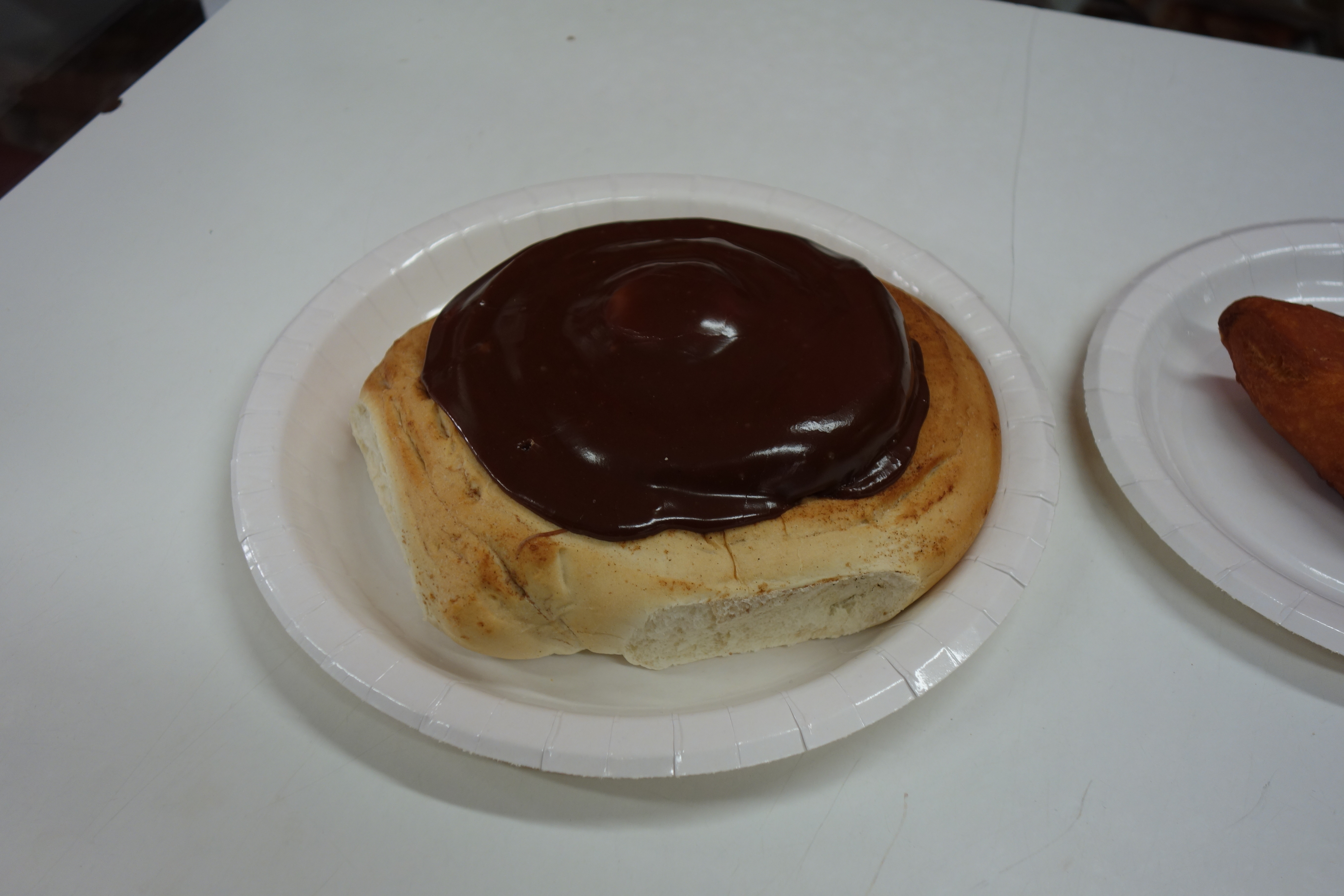
Snúður

Modern Icelandic bakeries offer a wide variety of breads and pastry. The first professional bakers in Iceland were Danish and this is still reflected in the professional traditions of Icelandic bakers. Long-time local favorites include snúður, a type of cinnamon roll, usually topped with glaze or melted chocolate, and skúffukaka, a single-layer chocolate cake baked in a roasting pan, covered with chocolate glaze and sprinkled with ground coconut.

A variety of layer cake called randalín, randabrauð or simply lagkaka has been popular in Iceland since the 19th century. These come in many varieties that all have in common five layers of 1/2-inch-thick (13 mm) cake alternated with layers of fruit preserve, jam or icing. One version called vínarterta, popular in the late 19th century, with layers of prunes, became a part of the culinary tradition of Icelandic immigrants in the U.S. and Canada.

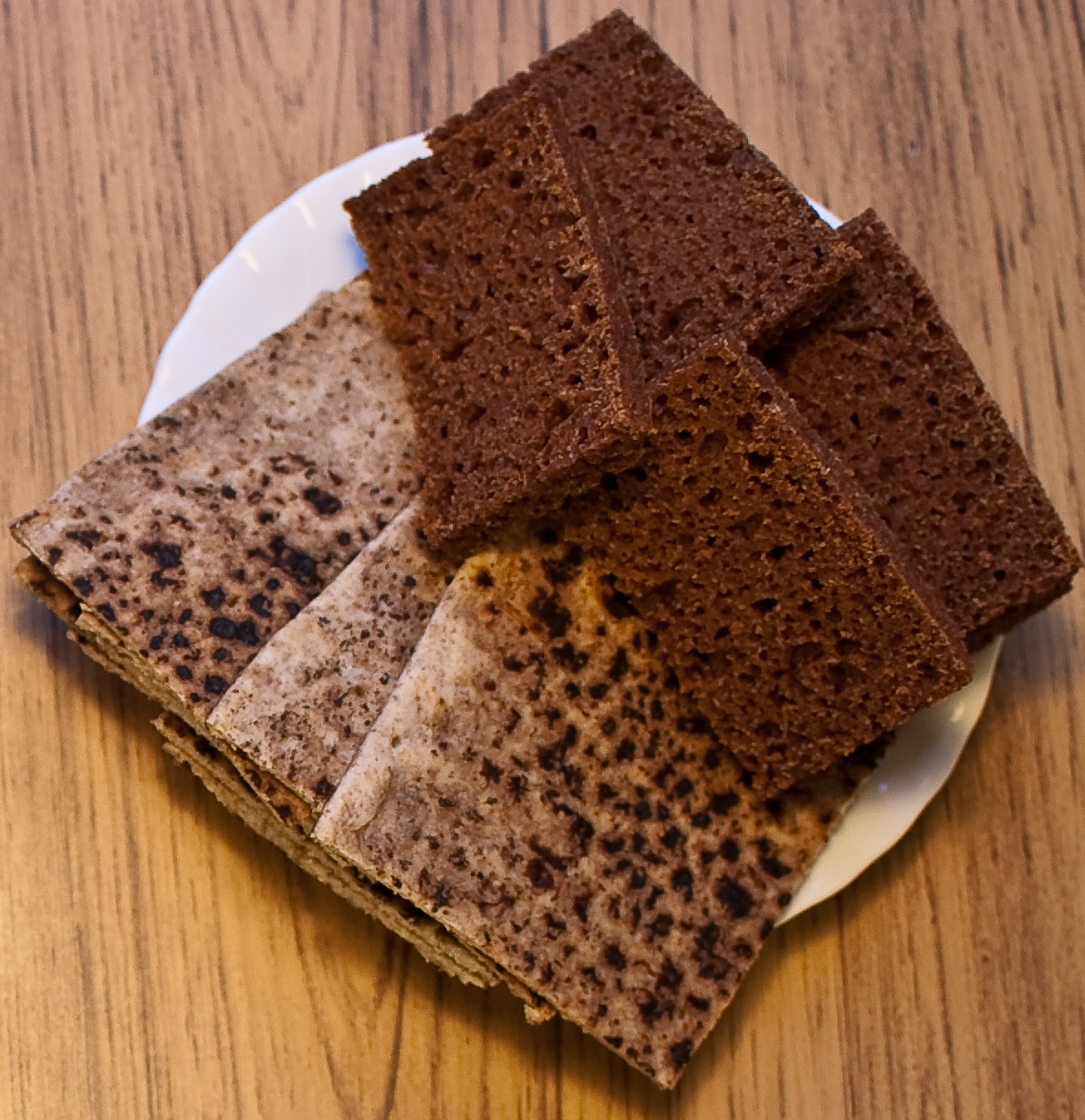
Rúgbrauð (top right) and flatbrauð (bottom left)

Traditional breads, still popular in Iceland, include rúgbrauð, a dense, dark and moist rye bread, traditionally baked in pots or special boxes used for baking in holes dug near hot springs, and flatkaka, a soft brown rye flatbread. A common way of serving hangikjöt is in thin slices on flatkaka. Other breads include skonsur which are soft breads, and Westfjord Wheatcakes (Vestfirskar hveitikökur).

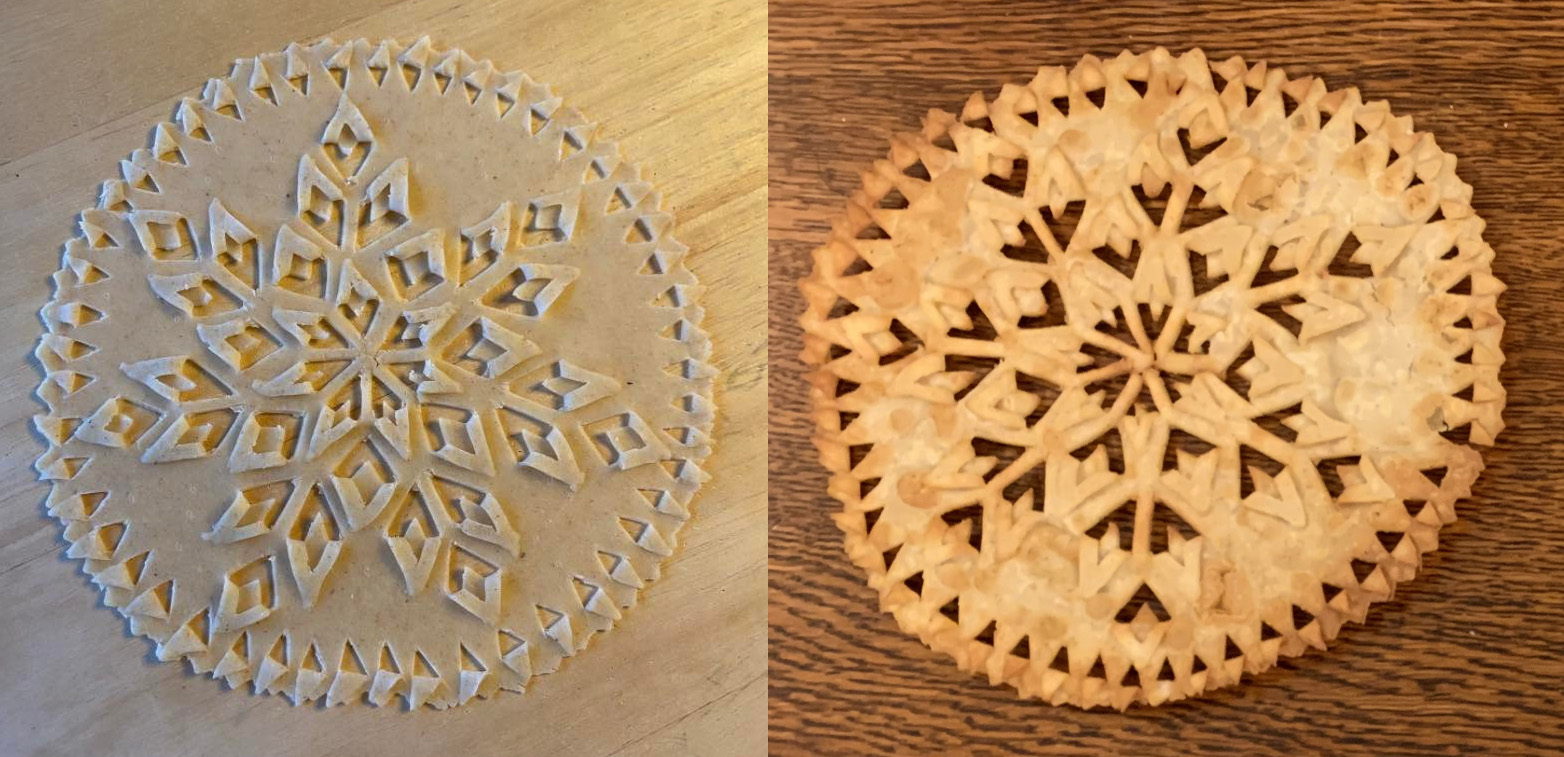
Laufabrauð

Traditional pastries include kleina, a small fried dough bun where the dough is flattened and cut into small trapezoids with a special cutting wheel (kleinujárn), a slit cut in the middle and then one end pulled through the slit to form a "knot". This is then deep-fried in oil. Laufabrauð (lit. "leafbread"), a very thin wafer, with patterns cut into it with a sharp knife and ridged cutting wheels and fried crisp in oil, is a traditional Christmas food, sometimes served with hangikjöt.

== Feasts ==
=== Christmas dishes ===
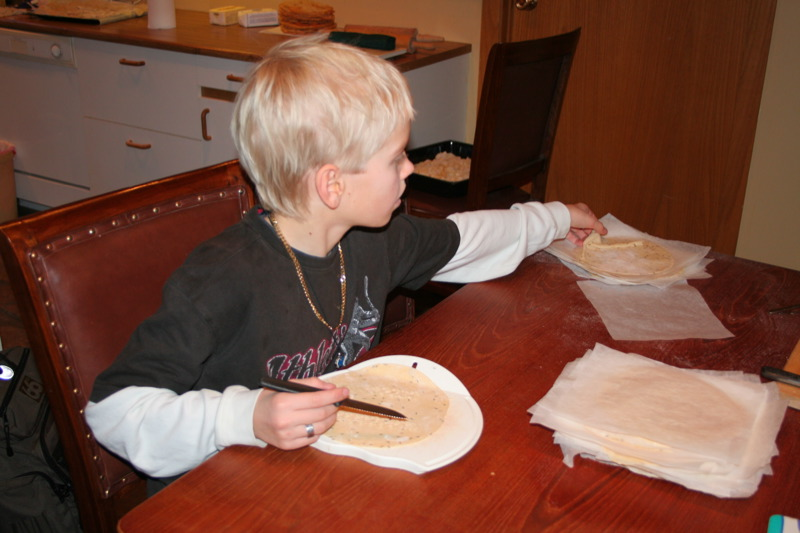
Decorating laufabrauð (leaf bread) is a Christmas tradition in many Icelandic homes.

In Iceland the Christmas dinner is traditionally served on Christmas Eve. Traditional main courses are hangikjöt (smoked lamb), hamborgarhryggur (salted pork rib) and various types of game, especially ptarmigan stew, puffin (sometimes lightly smoked) and roast greylag goose where these are available. These are usually accompanied by a béchamel or mushroom sauce, boiled potatoes and peas, pickled beetroot or red cabbage and jam. A traditional dessert is rice pudding with raisins, topped with ground cinnamon and sugar called jólagrautur ("Yule pudding").

On 23 December (mass of Saint Thorlak) there is a tradition (originally from the Westfjords) to serve fermented skate with melted tallow and boiled potatoes. Boiling the Christmas hangikjöt the day after serving the skate is said to dispel the strong smell which otherwise tends to linger around the house for days.

In the weeks before Christmas many households bake a variety of cookies to keep in store for friends and family throughout the holidays. These include piparkökur, a type of ginger biscuits often decorated with colored glaze. Laufabrauð is also fried some days before Christmas and decorating it is for many an occasion for holding a family gathering.

=== Þorramatur ===
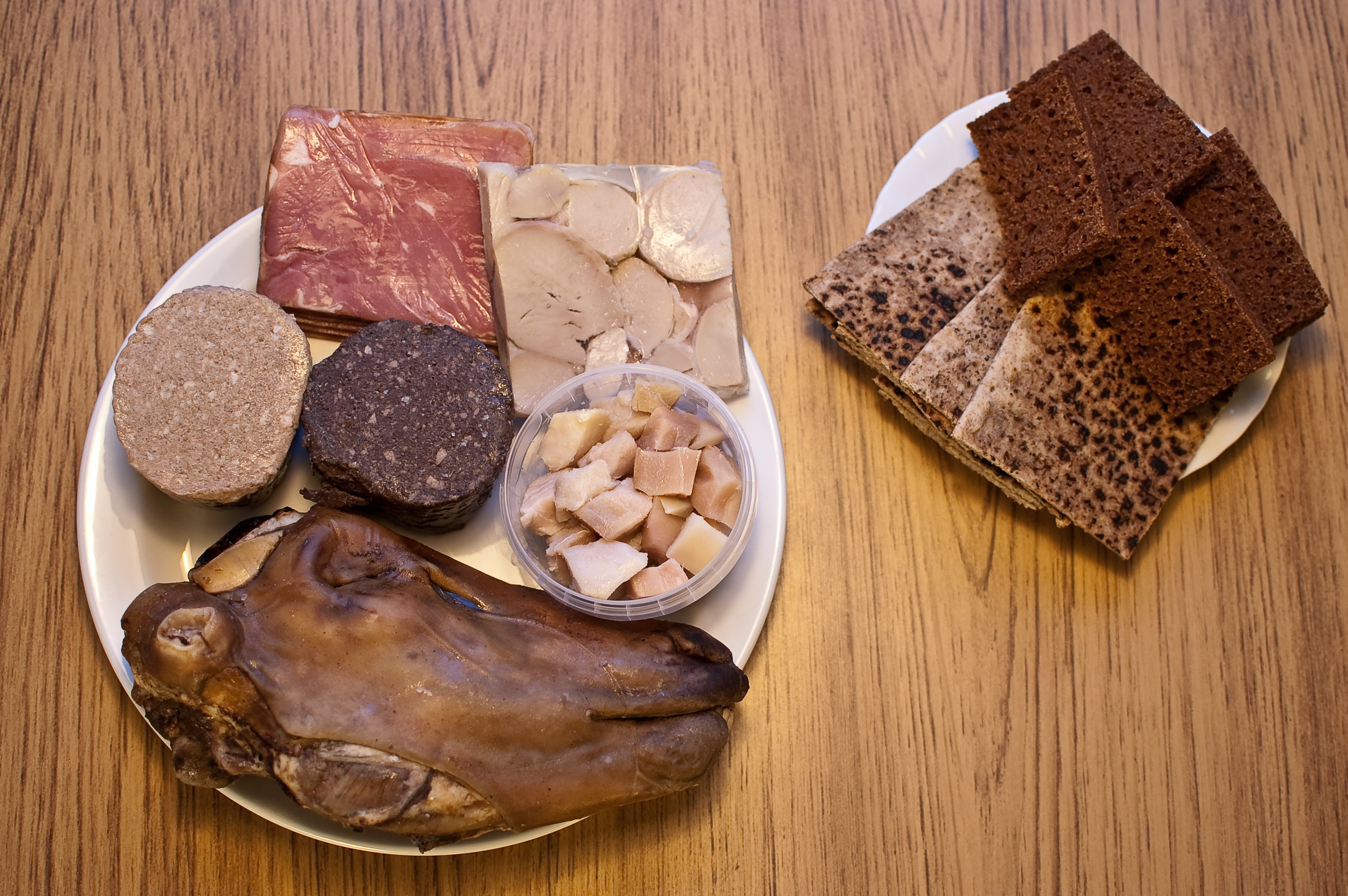
A typical Þorramatur assortment.

The concept of Þorramatur was invented by a restaurant in Reykjavík in 1958 when they started advertising a platter with a selection of traditional country food linking it to the tradition of Þorrablót popular since the late 19th century. The idea became very popular and for older generations the taste of the food will have brought back fond memories of growing up or spending summers in the countryside before World War II and the urbanisation boom. In recent years, however, þorramatur has come to represent the supposed strangeness and peculiarity of traditional Icelandic food, overlooking the fact that many commonplace foods are also traditional though not generally thought of as part of the þorramatur category.

=== Birthdays, weddings, baptisms and confirmations ===
These are the various occasions for inviting the extended family to a lunch or "afternoon tea" called kaffi in Icelandic, as filter coffee is usually served rather than tea. Traditional dishes include the kransakaka of Danish origin and various types of brauðterta, similar to the Swedish smörgåstårta with filling of e.g. shrimp, smoked salmon or hangikjöt and liberal amounts of mayonnaise between layers of white bread. Also popular for large family gatherings are various types of sponge cake, topped with fresh or canned fruit, whipped cream, marzipan and meringue. This tradition is satirised in an often-quoted passage from Halldór Laxness's novel, Under the Glacier, where the character Hnallþóra insists on serving multiple sorts of sumptuous cake for the bishop's emissary at all meals. Her name has become a byword for this type of cake.

== See also ==
- List of restaurants in Iceland
- Te & Kaffi
