= Iceland (disambiguation) =

Iceland is an island country in the Arctic and Atlantic oceans.

Iceland may also refer to:

- Iceland (film), 1942 American musical set in Iceland
- "Iceland" (song), 2016, by French DJ Petit Biscuit
- Iceland (supermarket), British supermarket chain
- Reuben Iceland (1884–1955), American poet

== See also ==
- Iceland boreal birch forests and alpine tundra, ecoregion of Iceland
- Icelandic (disambiguation)
- Icelander (disambiguation)
- Island (disambiguation)
- Islandia (disambiguation)
- Ireland (disambiguation)
