= Ice island =

Ice island may refer to:

- Iceberg, particularly a tabular iceberg
- Pobeda Ice Island, a periodic island formed when a tabular iceberg runs aground
- Ice Island, a fictional setting from the video game Kirby: Squeak Squad

== See also ==
- Iceland (disambiguation)
