= Icelandic =

Icelandic refers to anything of, from, or related to Iceland and may refer to:

- Icelandic people
- Icelandic language
- Icelandic orthography
- Icelandic cuisine

== See also ==
- Icelander (disambiguation)
- Icelandic Airlines, a predecessor of Icelandair
- Icelandic horse, a breed of domestic horse
- Icelandic sheep, a breed of domestic sheep
- Icelandic Sheepdog, a breed of domestic dog
- Icelandic cattle, a breed of cattle
- Icelandic chicken, a breed of chicken
