= Hangikjöt =

Icelandic smoked meat dish traditional for Christmas

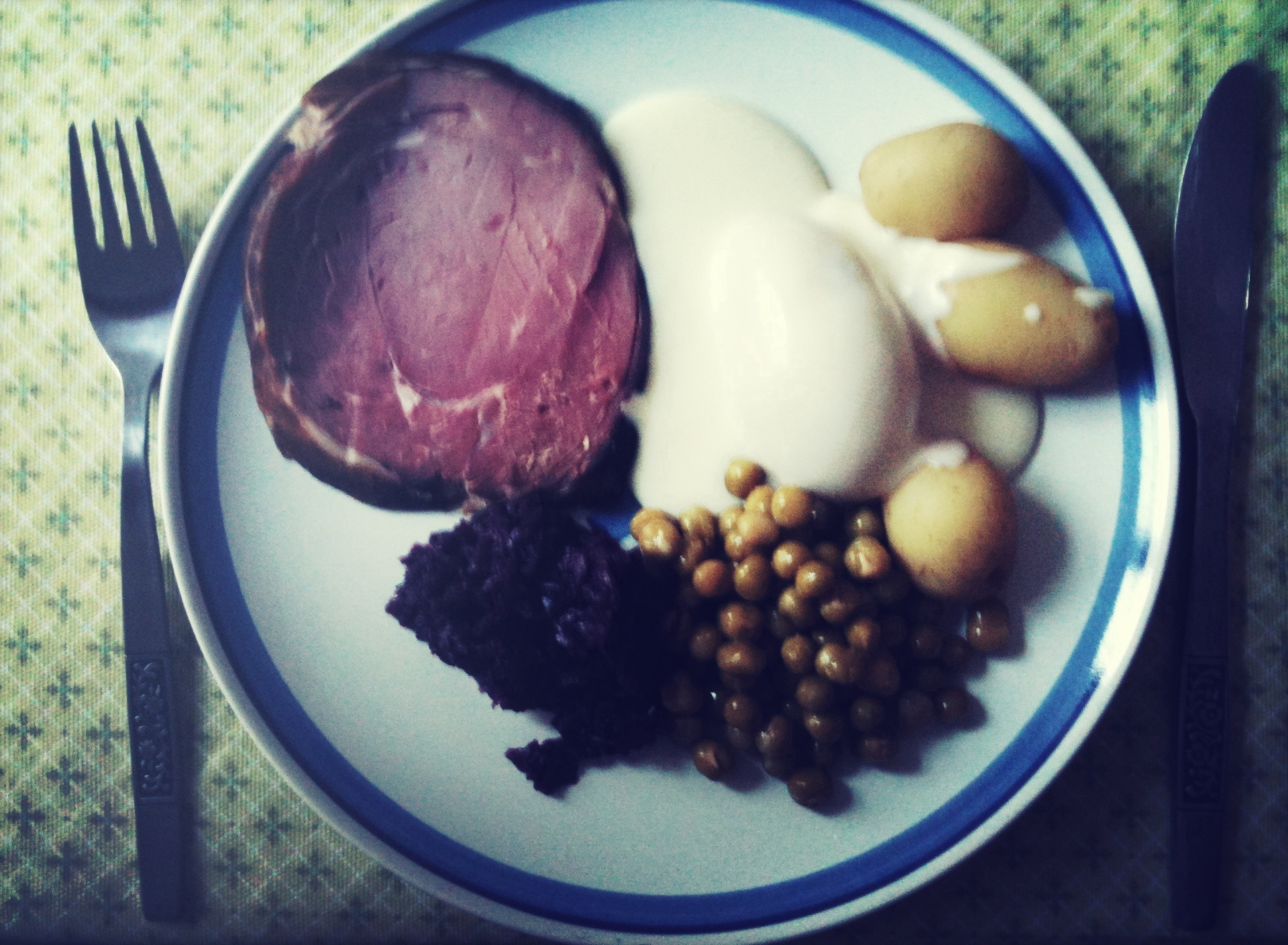
Hangikjöt with potatoes in béchamel sauce and green peas

Hangikjöt (Icelandic pronunciation: [ˈhauɲcɪˌcʰœːt]; lit. "hung meat") is a traditional festive food in Iceland, served at Christmas.

== Etymology and history ==
This Icelandic smoked lamb, mutton, or horse meat is usually boiled and served either hot or cold in slices, traditionally with potatoes in béchamel sauce and green peas, or in thin slices on bread such as flatkaka or rúgbrauð or laufabrauð. It takes its name from the old tradition of smoking food in order to preserve it by hanging it from the rafters of a smoking shed.

Sometimes, bits of string are present in the meat, having been tied around the meat to compress it and hold it together as it is being smoked; the strings are not eaten.

There are several types of hangikjöt. The meat can come from various parts of the sheep, but the most common is the hind legs. A whole leg on the bone, with an adequate layer of fat, is by many considered the best of all, although others prefer the convenience of a boned roll of meat or want most of the fat trimmed off.

== Commercial form ==
In recent years other types have become available, such as tvíreykt ("twice smoked") hangikjöt, i.e. lamb or mutton that has been smoked for a longer period of time and is more like the old country hangikjöt which often hung high above the kitchen fire for many months. This is usually served raw in thin slices, sometimes in a manner similar to the Italian prosciutto, with melon. Modern commercial hangikjöt is usually fairly lightly smoked. The two main types are either smoked with Icelandic birch or with dried sheep dung.

A recent survey established that around 90% of all Icelanders eat hangikjöt at least once over the holidays.

Smoked mutton is known as macon in the UK, but is not common.

== See also ==
- List of lamb dishes
- List of smoked foods
