= Flatkaka =

Icelandic rye flatbread

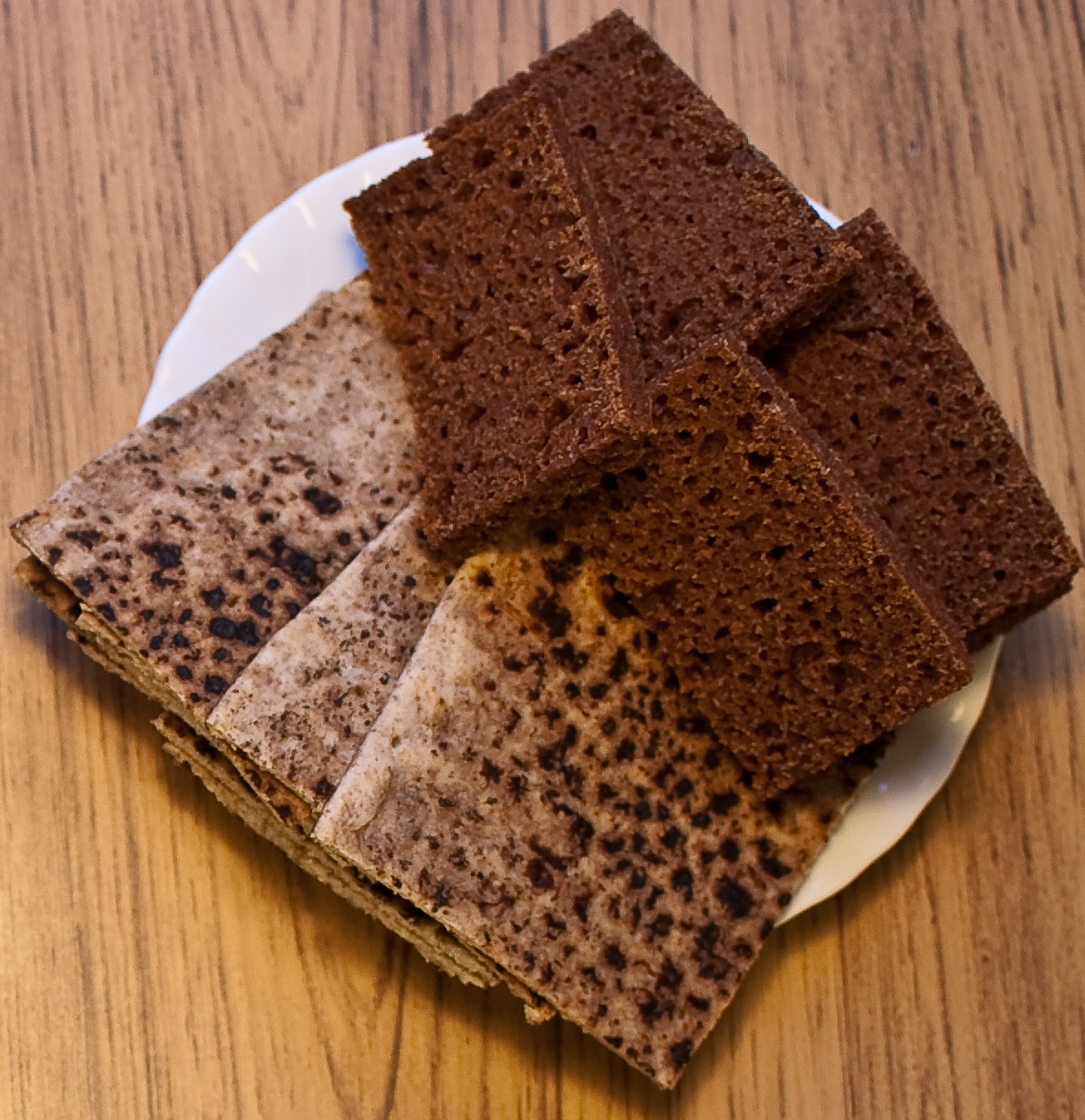
- rúgbrauð (top right) and flatbrauð (bottom left)
- Type: Flatbread
- Place of origin: Iceland
- Main ingredients: Rye flour

Flatkaka (Icelandic pronunciation: [ˈflaːtˌkʰaːka], lit. "flat cake") or flatbrauð (Icelandic pronunciation: [-ˌprœyːθ], lit. "flat bread") is an Icelandic unleavened rye flatbread. Flatkaka is soft, round, thin and dark with a characteristic pattern from the pan.

Traditionally, flatkaka was baked on hot stones or straight on the embers of the fire, later on small but heavy cast iron frying pans, and today, when making flatkaka at home, people sometimes bake them directly on an electric hot plate to get the desired result. There usually is a difference between home-made flatkaka and the varieties sold in stores, the latter being somewhat thicker and dryer because of added wheat flour.

It is assumed that the Icelandic tradition of baking flatbread goes back to the settlement of Iceland in the 9th century. Historically, Iceland moss (Cetraria islandica) was sometimes used as a supplement due to lack of grain on the island.

Flatkaka is usually served cut into halves or quarters, with a topping of butter or mutton pâté, with hangikjöt, smoked salmon or even pickled herring.

== See also ==
- Rye bread
- Rúgbrauð
- List of breads
