= Rúgbrauð =

Icelandic rye bread

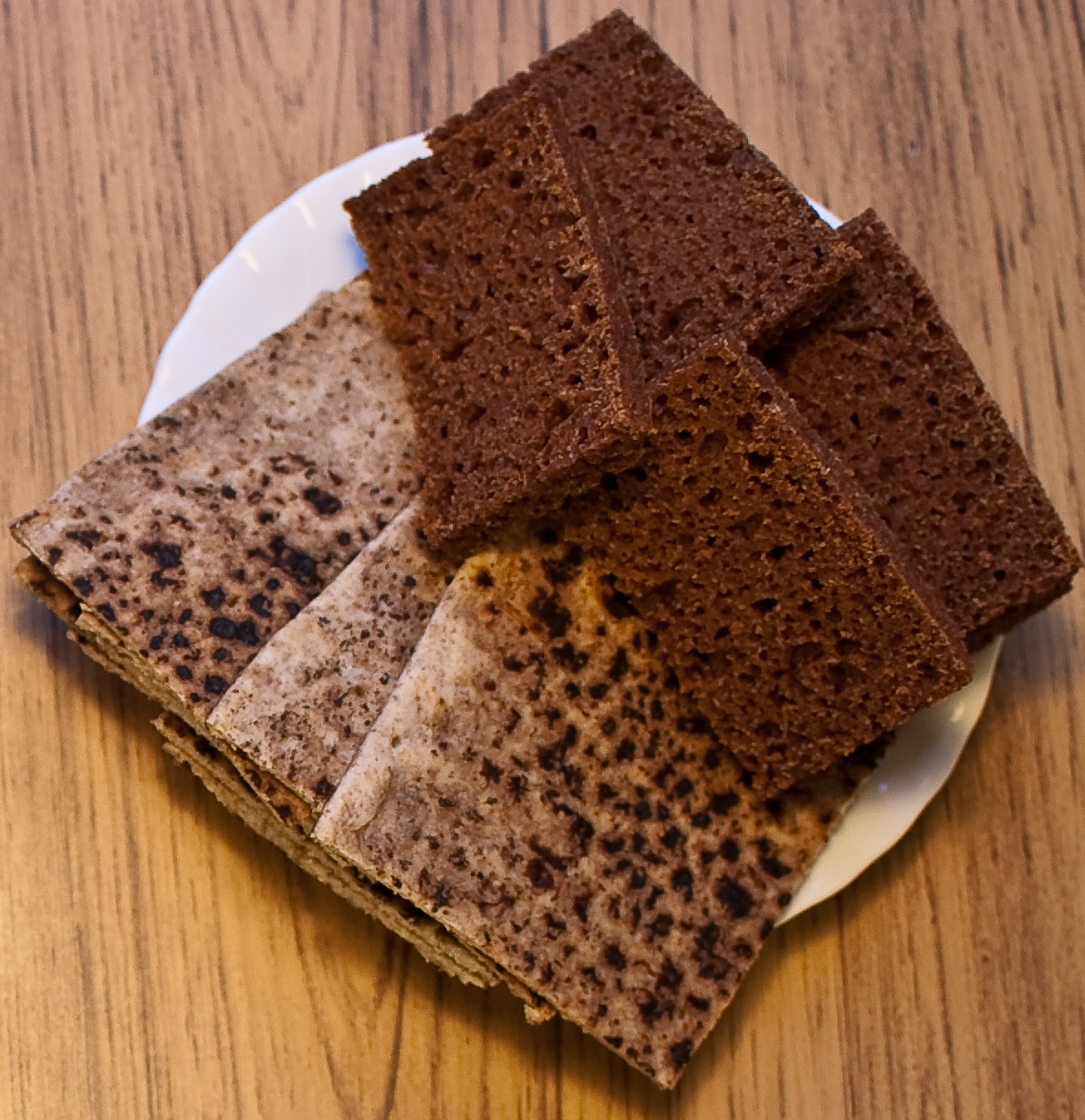
- rúgbrauð (top right) and flatbrauð (bottom left)
- Alternative names: þrumari
- Type: Rye bread
- Place of origin: Iceland
- Region or state: Iceland

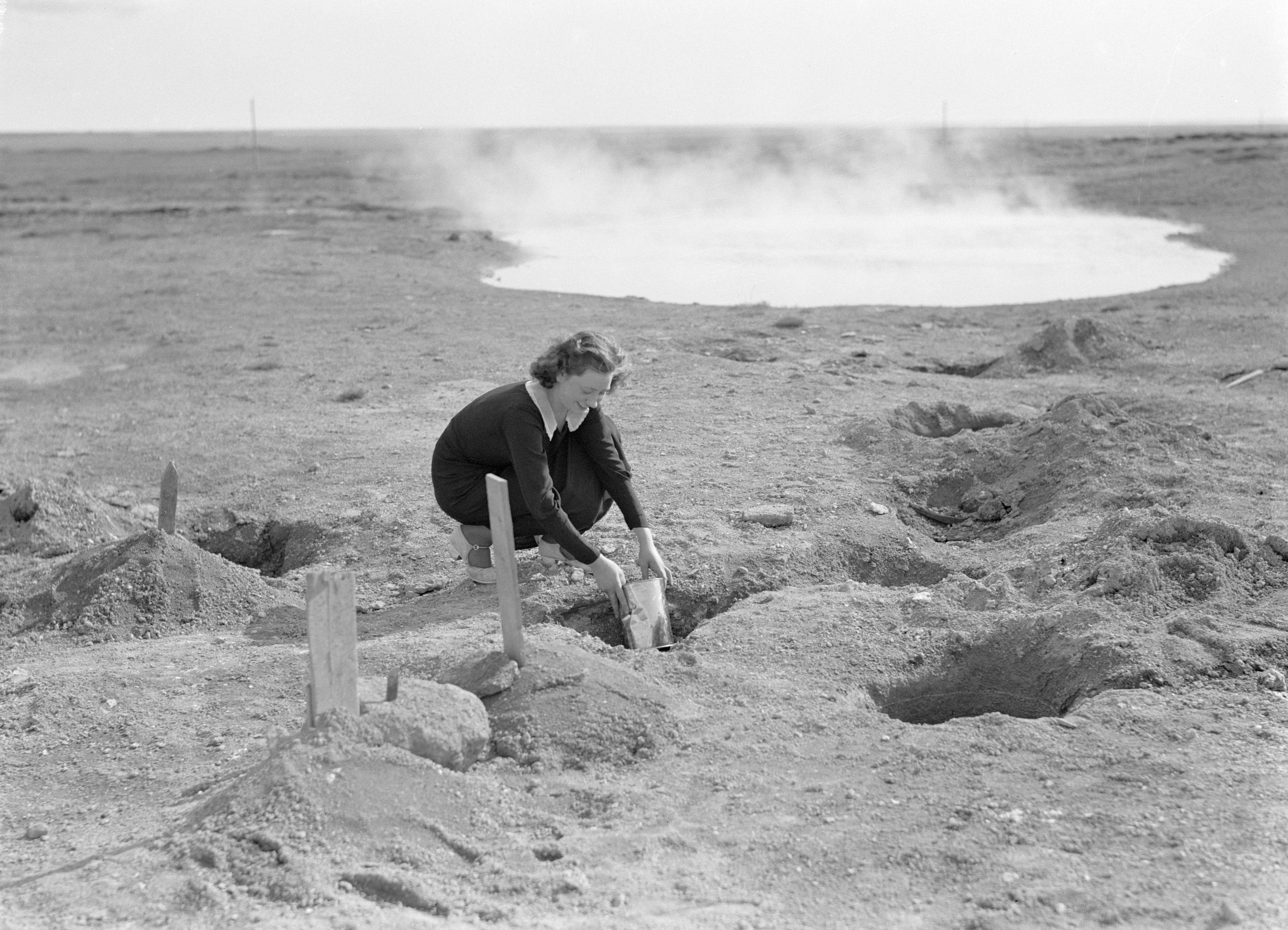
Baking bread in the hot sand at Laugarvatn

Rúgbrauð (Icelandic pronunciation: [ˈruː(ɣ)ˌprœyːθ], lit. 'rye bread') is an Icelandic straight rye bread. It is traditionally baked in a pot or steamed in special wooden casks by burying it in the ground near a geyser, in which case it is known as hverabrauð [ˈkʰvɛːraˌprœyːθ] or "hot-spring-bread". Modern rúgbrauð is usually made in a square baking pan. The bread is crustless, dark and very dense, usually rather sweet, and keeps for a long time. It is often served with butter, mutton pâté, hangikjöt (smoked lamb), or pickled herring. Dry rúgbrauð would be ground and mixed with buttermilk to form a kind of porridge. Stale rúgbrauð is often soaked, then made into brauðsúpa ([ˈprœyːðˌsuːpa], "bread soup") – that is, simmered with raisins and flavorings (usually lemon) and served hot with whipped cream as a dessert.

Excessive consumption of this bread is said to cause flatulence, earning it its nickname þrumari, which roughly translates as "thunderbread" or "thunderer".

There are, however, varieties of the traditional rye bread with wheat and whole grain added to make it less dense, but also called rúgbrauð. These varieties tend to be less heavy than the traditional straight rye variety and more similar to the modern Danish rugbrød or German pumpernickel.

Rye, produced in Denmark and exported to Iceland, became the predominant cereal in Icelandic cuisine in the early modern period after a trade monopoly was instituted by the king of Denmark in 1602, remaining in effect until 1786.

In September 2022, American seismologist Julian Lozos attempted to bake rúgbrauð in his car during a heatwave in the San Fernando Valley. Whilst unsuccessful, Lozos' attempt was covered in the Icelandic press and earned him an interview with Ryan Seacrest.

== See also ==
- Rye bread
- Rugbrød
- Ruisleipä
- Pumpernickel
