= Icelandic turf house =

House type

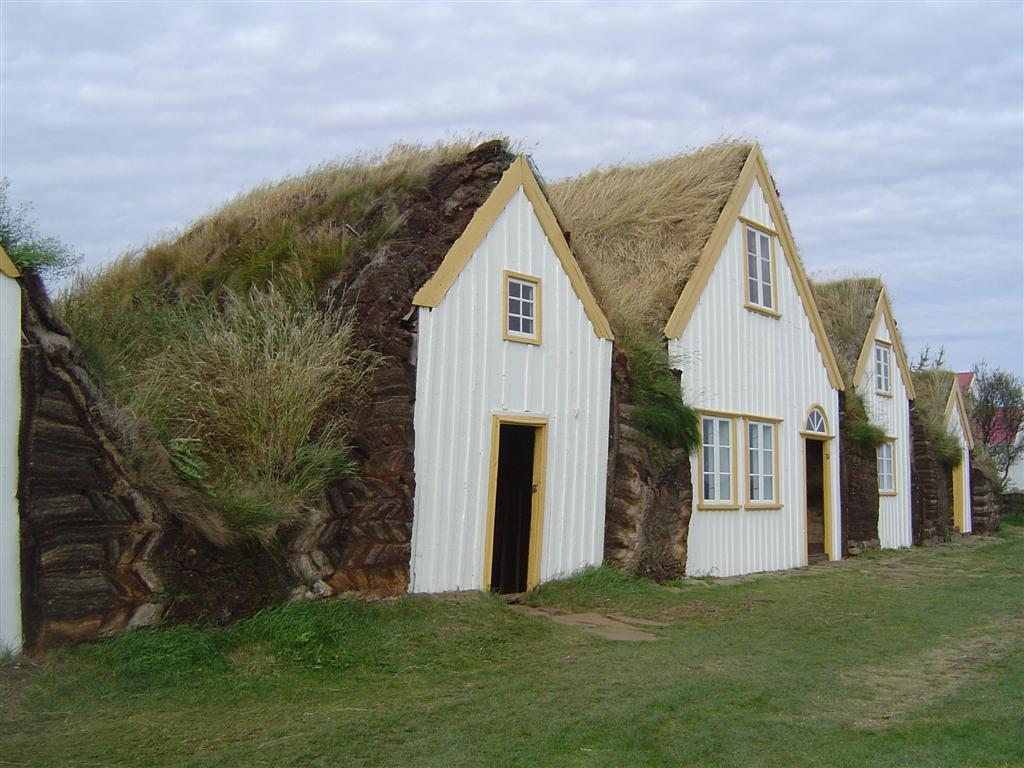
Turf houses of the burstabær style in Glaumbær

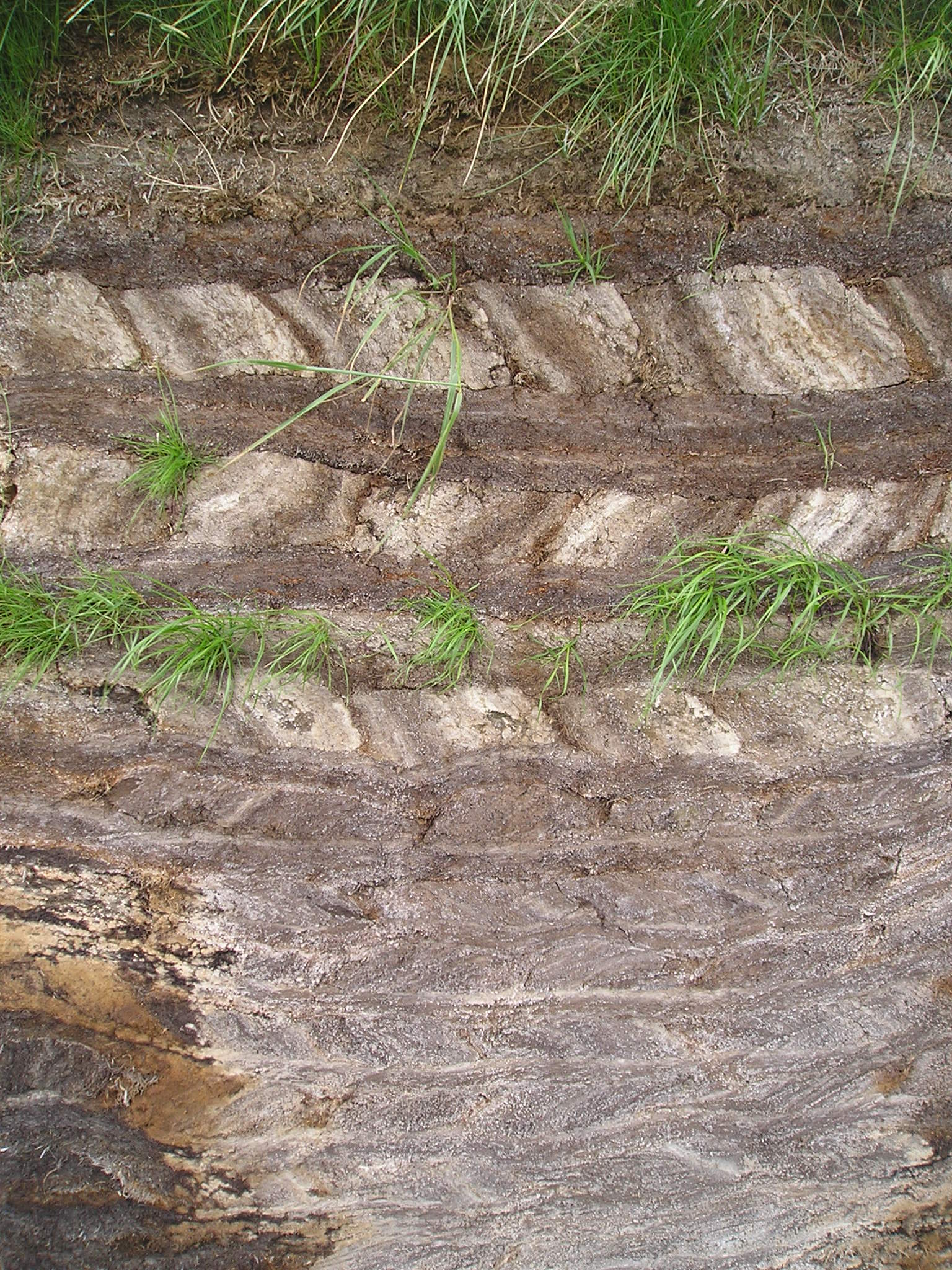
Peat wall, Glaumbær, Iceland

Icelandic turf houses (Icelandic: torfbæir [ˈtʰɔrvˌpaijɪr̥]) are timber structures with turf walls and turf as a cover for the roof. Turf houses have been constructed since Iceland was settled in the 9th century. Turf houses were the product of a difficult climate, offering superior insulation compared to buildings solely made of wood or stone, and the relative difficulty in obtaining other construction materials in sufficient quantities.

30% of Iceland was forested when it was settled, mostly with birch. Oak was the preferred timber for building Norse halls in Scandinavia, but native birch had to serve as the primary framing material on the remote island. However, Iceland did have a large amount of turf that was suitable for construction. Some structures in Norway had turf roofs, so the notion of using this as a building material would not have been alien to many settlers.

== Construction ==
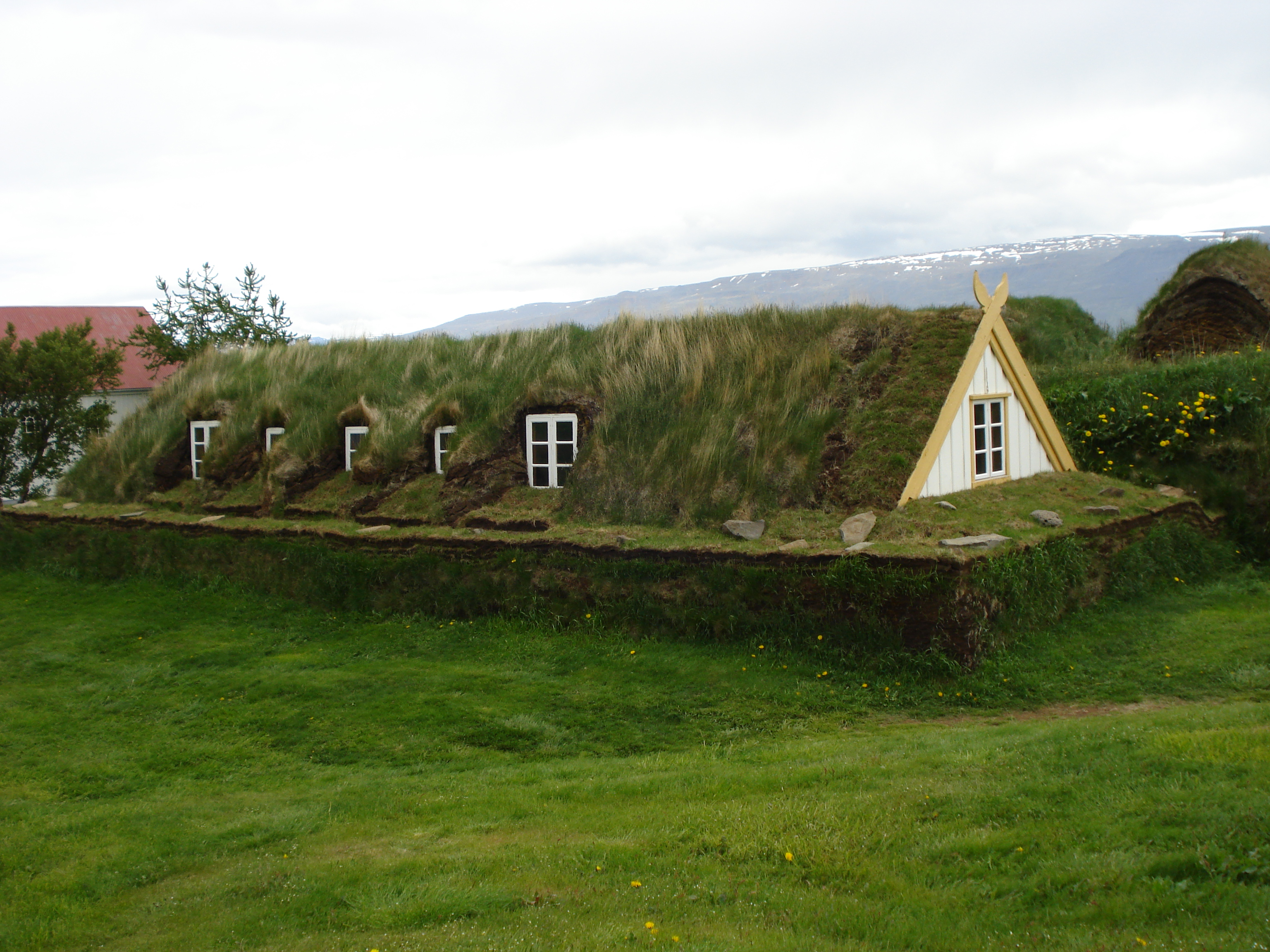
Turf roof of a house in Glaumbær, Iceland

The common Icelandic turf house has a large foundation made of flat stones; upon this is a wooden frame to hold the load of the turf. The turf is fitted around the frame in blocks, often with a second layer, or in the more fashionable herringbone pattern.

Traditionally, the only external wood is the doorway, which would often be decorative; the doorway would lead into the hall which would commonly have a great fire. The floor of a turf house could be covered with wood, stone or earth depending on the purpose of the building.

== Evolution ==
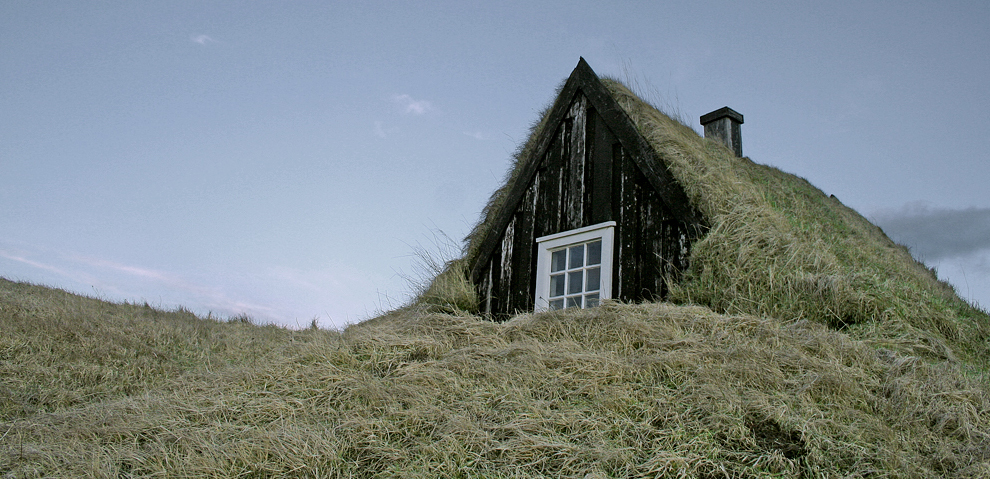
Turf house with a wooden gafli in Iceland.

Icelandic architecture changed in many ways in more than 1,000 years after the turf houses were being constructed. The first evolutionary step happened in the 14th century, when the Viking-style longhouses were gradually abandoned and replaced with many small and specialized interconnected buildings. Then in the late 18th century a new style started to gain momentum, the burstabær, with its wooden ends or gaflar. This is the most commonly depicted version of the Icelandic turf houses and many such survived well into the 20th century. This style was then slowly replaced with the urban building style of wooden house clothed in corrugated iron, which in turn was replaced with the earthquake-resistant reinforced concrete building.

== See also ==
- Sod house
- Earth lodge
- Earth shelter – House partially or entirely surrounded by earth
