= Vínarterta =

Icelandic confection

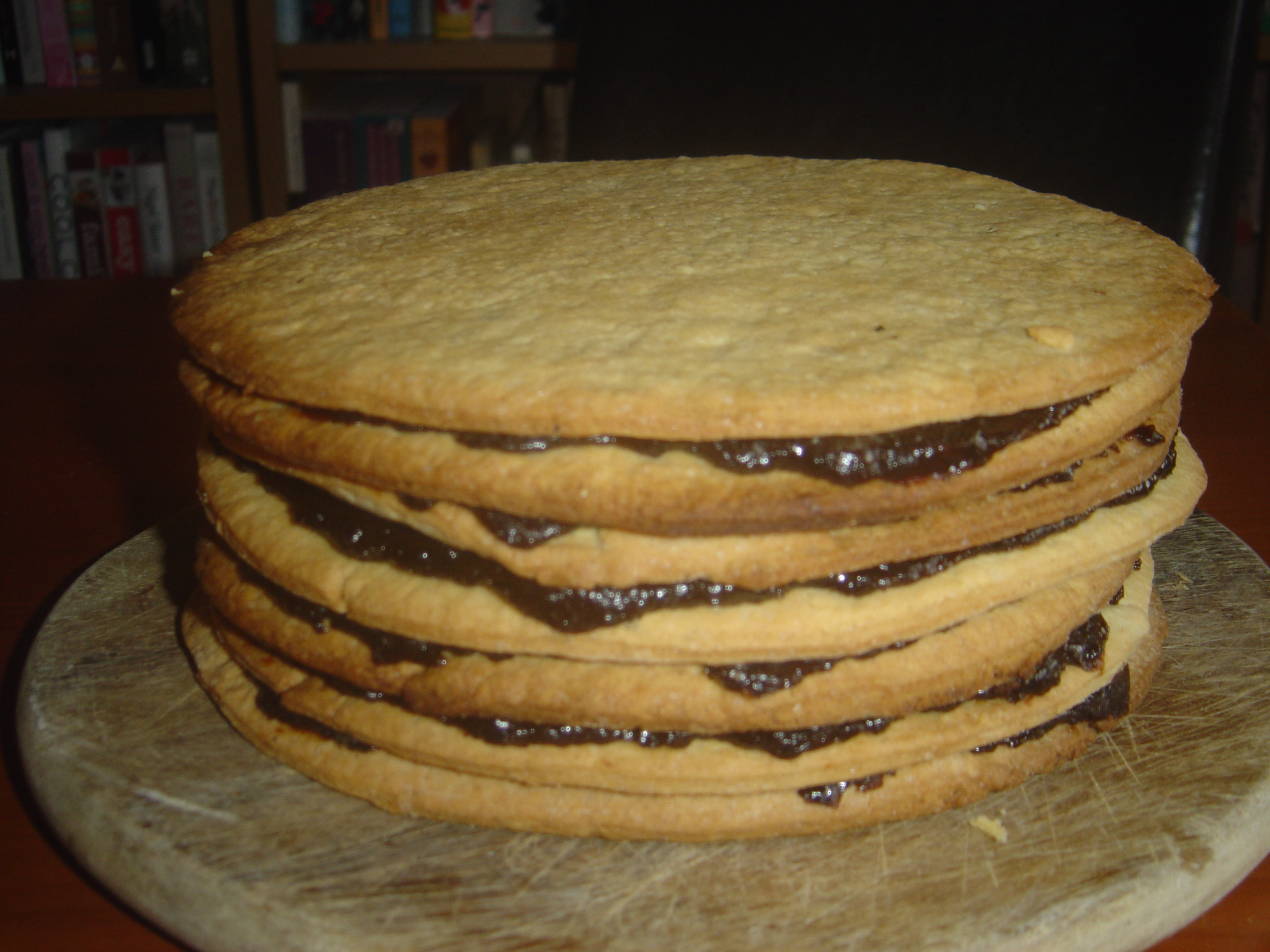
- Alternative names: Randalín
- Type: Cake
- Course: Dessert
- Place of origin: Iceland
- Main ingredients: shortbread, prunes

Vínarterta (Icelandic pronunciation: [ˈviːnarˌtʰɛr̥ta], "Vienna torte") or Randalín, is a dessert originating in 19th century Iceland, now popular among the descendants of Icelandic migrants to North America. Most vínarterta are multi-layered cakes made from alternating layers of almond and/or cardamom-flavoured biscuit or shortbread and dried prunes or sometimes plum jam, the filling sometimes including spices such as cinnamon, vanilla, cloves, and cardamom.

The cake is typically served in rectangular slices with coffee. It is served during Christmas and celebration events such as weddings or funerals.

== Variations ==
Other fillings can be strawberry, rhubarb, or apricot. Although apricot and rhubarb are less well known as fillings, they are traditional going back to the 19th century.

Vínarterta can be iced with bourbon or vodka flavored sugar glaze, however some recipes strictly reject the use of liquor, sometimes as a result of strong first wave feminist and temperance sentiment amongst earlier generations of Icelandic women.

== History ==
The cake's history was the subject of a book chapter by historian L.K. Bertram who argues that Icelandic "Vienna torte" came to Iceland from Vienna through Denmark, likely arriving on the far northern island in a Danish cookbook or through a baker connected to Copenhagen sometime after 1793, but it's a debatable issue. Icelandic bakers then revised the recipe to adapt to limited access to imported goods, resulting in a recipe that focused on dried plums, which were more cost effective and could withstand the long trip to Iceland. This recipe was brought to Manitoba by Icelandic immigrants to Canada, many of whom initially settled at New Iceland, but can be found throughout Icelandic settlements and households in North America, including the American midwest and the Pacific coast.

The cake is now better-known in the Icelandic communities in Canada and the United States than it is in Iceland.

== See also ==
- Icelandic cuisine
- List of cakes
