= Islandia =

Islandia may refer to:

- Islandia, the Latin name for Iceland
- Islandia, a 1942 novel by Austin Tappan Wright
- Islandia, a 1983 video game by Julian Gollop
- Islandia, Florida, a community in the United States
- Islandia, New York, a village in the United States
- Principality of Islandia, a micronation which claims territory in Belize
