= Icelander =

Icelander may refer to:

- Icelanders, people from the country of Iceland
- Icelander (novel), by Dustin Long, published in 2006 by McSweeney's
- Íslendingur (ship), a replica Viking ship whose name means Icelander

== See also ==
- Icelandic (disambiguation)
