= Te & Kaffi =

Icelandic coffee company

- Native name: Te og Kaffi
- Industry: Coffee shop
- Founded: April 28, 1984; 41 years ago
- Founders: Berglind Guðbrandsdóttir; Sigmundur Dýrfjörð
- Headquarters: Stapahraun 4, Hafnarfjörður, Iceland
- Number of locations: 14
- Products: Coffee beverages; Smoothies; Tea; Baked goods; Sandwiches
- Website: www.teogkaffi.is

Te & Kaffi is an Icelandic coffee company and coffeehouse chain. Established in 1984 by Berglind Guðbrandsdóttir and Sigmundur Dýrfjörð, Te & Kaffi operates Iceland's biggest coffee roastery, a chain of 9 coffeehouses and a wholesale business focusing on coffee, loose-leaf tea and other related products.
