= Laufabrauð =

Icelandic bread associated with Christmas

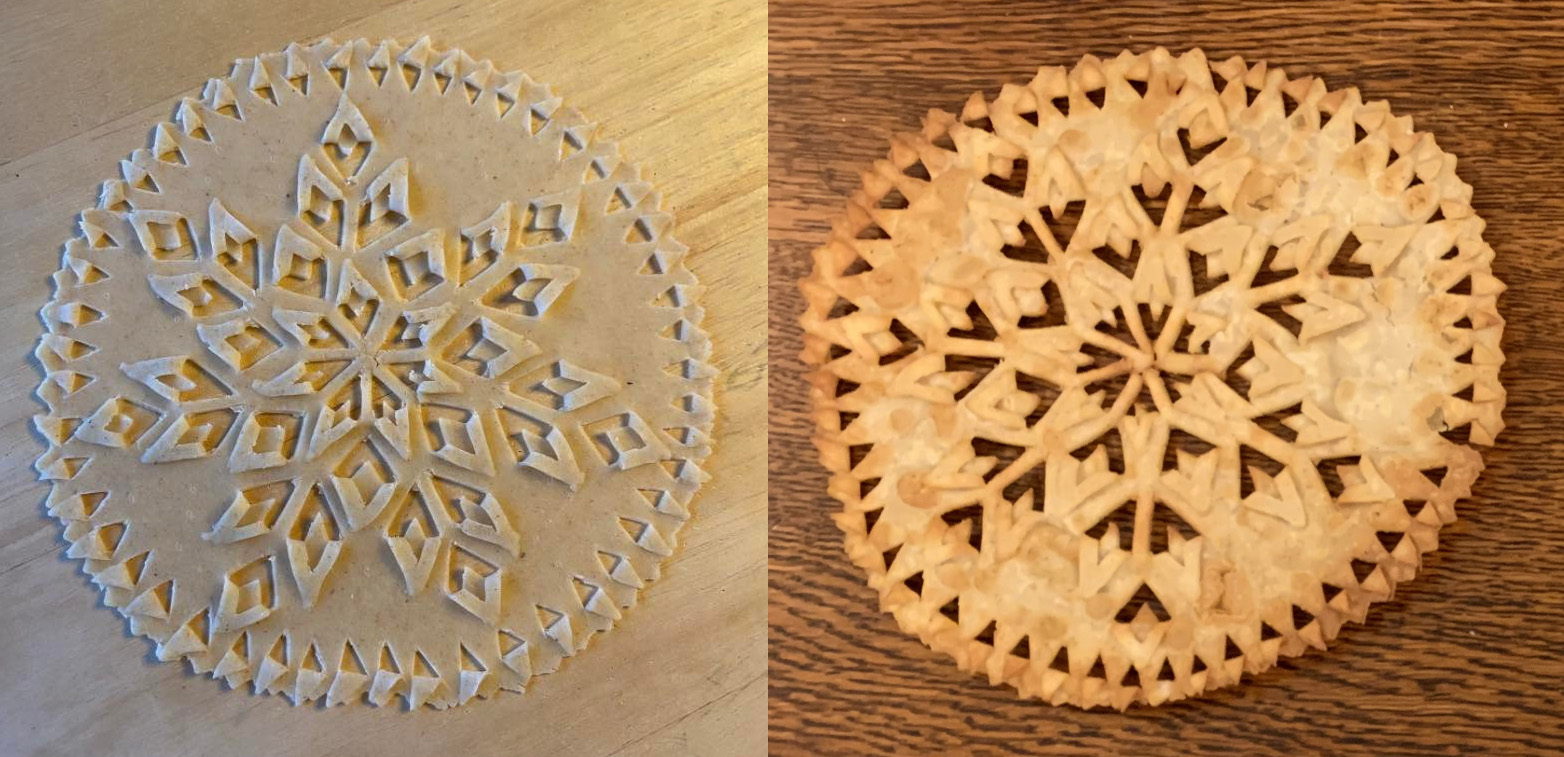
- Before and after frying. A design based on the typical "V"-like flaps, although here the flaps do not overlap.
- Type: Flatbread
- Place of origin: Iceland

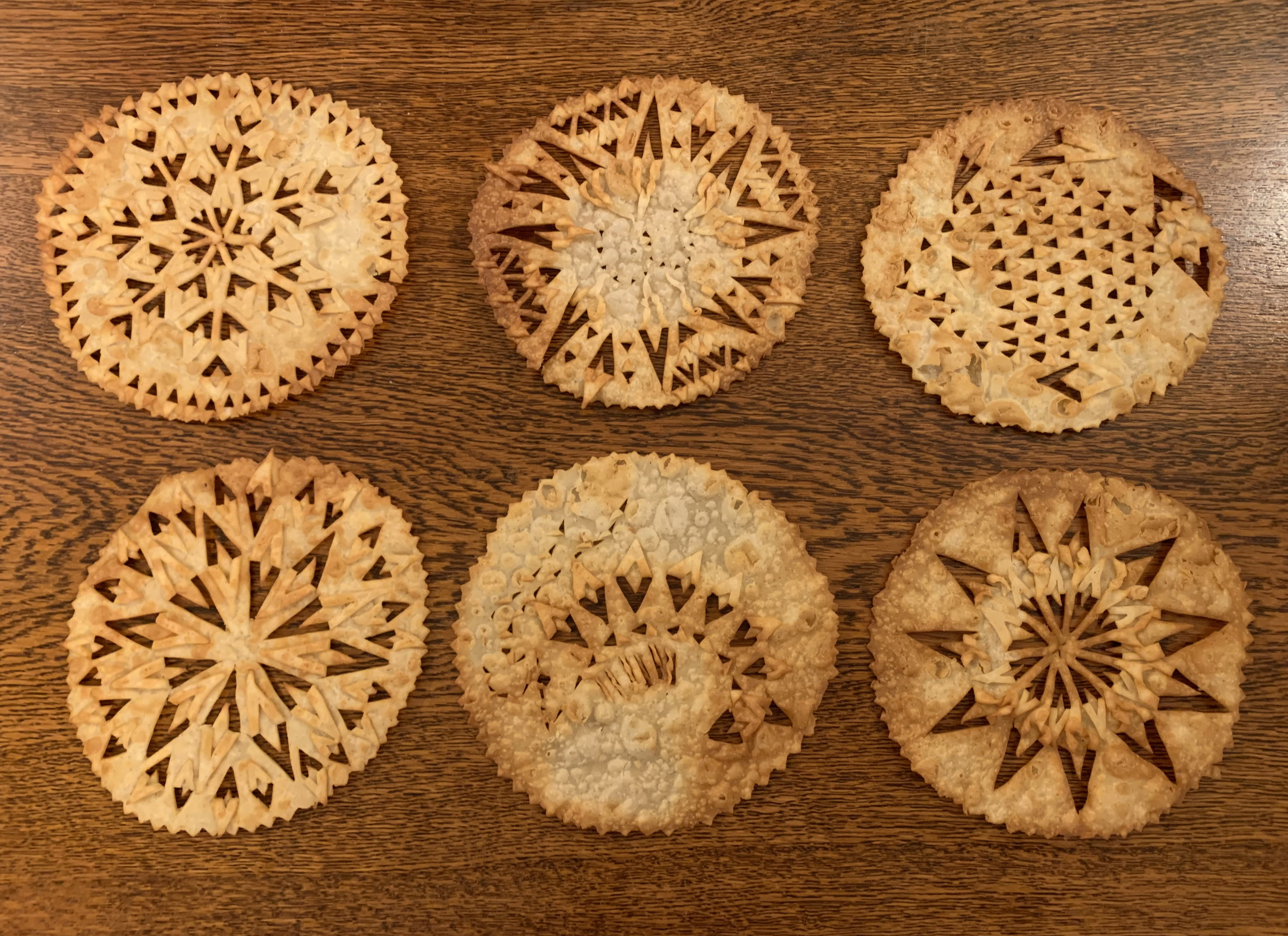
Various intricate designs

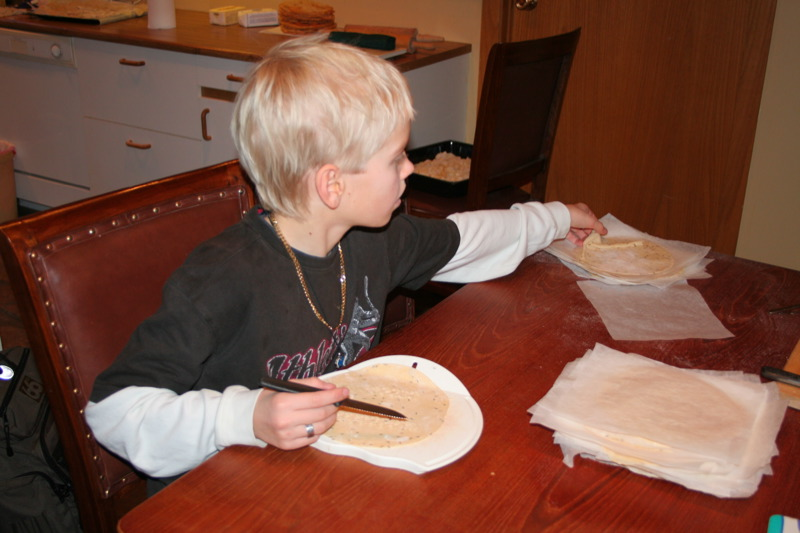
Child decorating laufabrauð before frying

Laufabrauð (Icelandic pronunciation: [ˈlœyːvaˌprœyːθ], "leaf-bread"; sometimes also called "snowflake-bread" in English) is a traditional kind of Icelandic bread that is almost exclusively eaten in the Christmas season. Originating from northern Iceland but now eaten throughout the country, it consists of round, very thin flat cakes with a diameter of about 15 to 20 cm (6 to 8 inches), decorated with leaf-like, geometric patterns and fried briefly in hot tallow or oil.

Laufabrauð can be bought in bakeries or made at home, either with ready-made dough or from scratch; patterns are either cut by hand or created using a heavy brass roller, the laufabrauðsjárn ([ˈlœyːvaˌprœyðsˌjau(r)tn̥], "leaf-bread iron"). The most common pattern consists of rows of "V"-like flaps; each flap overlaps with the next one to form a braid-like design. The rows can then form a larger pattern, such as a snowflake or a letter.

Leaf-bread making at home is usually a family undertaking and often an essential part of the Christmas preparations, where several generations gather and take part in the decorating.
