= Slátur =

Icelandic food

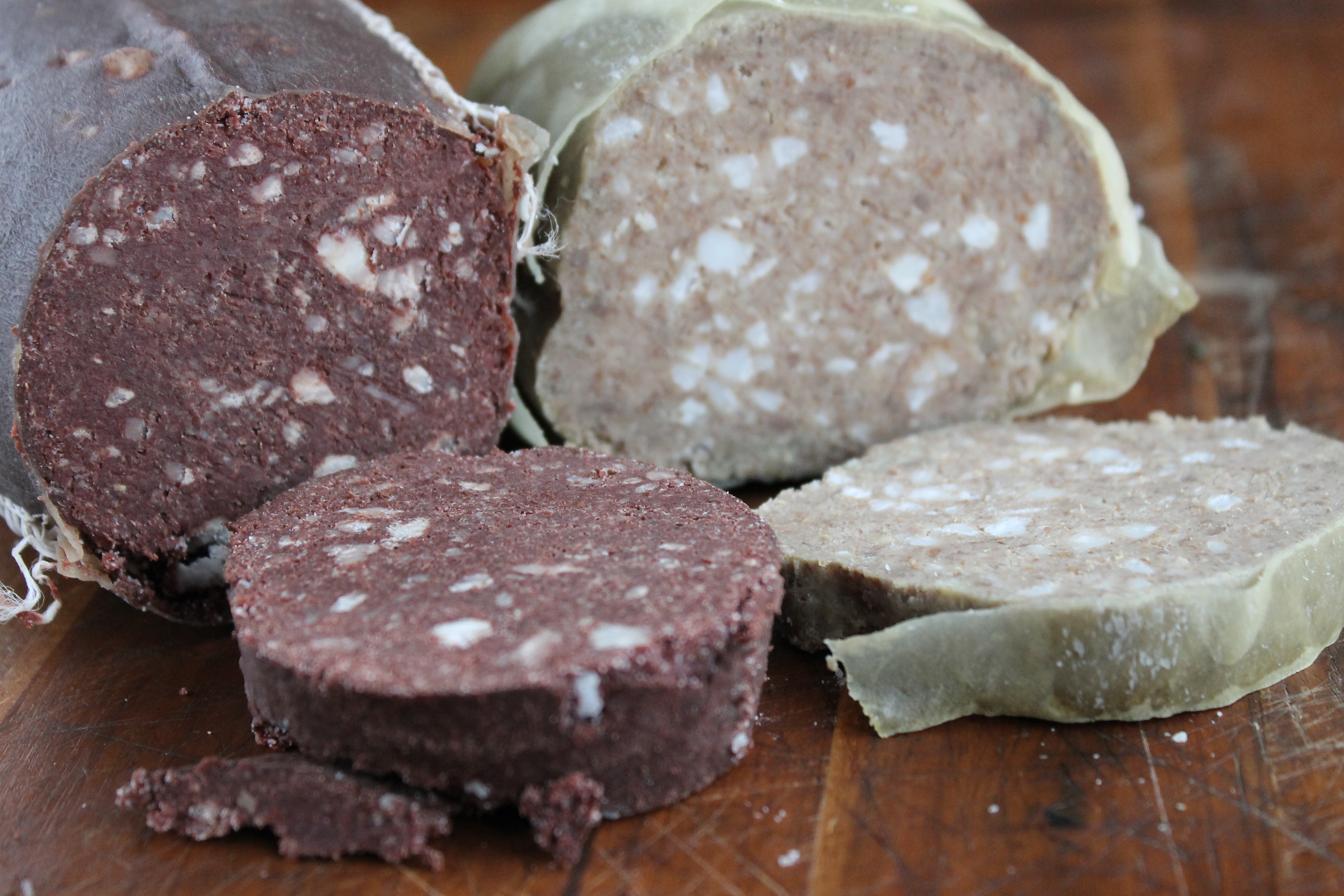
Slátur

Slátur (Icelandic pronunciation: [ˈstlauːtʏr̥], "slaughter") is an Icelandic food made from the innards of sheep. There are two types of slátur; blóðmör (Icelandic) or "blood pudding" and lifrarpylsa ("liver sausage"). The first is similar to Irish and British black pudding, although it does not contain the spices used in British and Irish cuisine. They are also much smoother in texture.

== Ingredients ==
Ingredients for slátur are sheep's blood, chopped or minced sheep's fat, rye flour, oatmeal, flour and salt.

== About ==
Both blood pudding and liver sausage are prepared in a similar fashion. Pouches are cut and sewn from the stomach, as in traditional haggis, or artificial non-edible pouches can be used. They are filled with a mixture of sliced/minced fat (mör) or suet, flour (rye and oats), rolled oats and either blood or finely-minced liver (sometimes kidney is also blended in). The pouches are sewn shut after filling, then they are slow boiled for 2–3 hours. Slátur may be eaten hot or cold and sometimes it is pickled in whey.

Blood pudding has been made using sheep's blood in Iceland since ancient times and similar recipes exist in many countries, using pig's blood instead. In previous centuries moss was used instead of imported flour. Liver pudding seems to have come into being at a much later stage; references to it appear during the mid-19th century.

Offal is food of the autumn, prepared at the traditional slaughter time. Right up until the mid 20th century slátur was made in every home in Iceland. Many families made slátur together as a common activity. After the economic crash in autumn 2008, there appears to have been a considerable increase in slátur sales, as slátur is cheap food. Prepared and cooked offal, both blood and liver pudding, is available in stores all year round but many people consider it largely as þorramatur, at the festival of Þorrablót, celebrated in January and February each year. Slátur is presented alongside other savoury and sour dishes at this time of year, including hákarl.

Blood pudding is sometimes served with cinnamon and sugar, or sometimes with raisins. When it is served hot is usually eaten with mashed or boiled potatoes and swede/yellow turnip. It can also be cut it into slices and fried in a pan. Liver pudding is also eaten hot with potatoes. Pickled or cold new blood pudding and liver pudding are commonly cut into slices and served with porridge or a type of rice pudding called hrísgrjónagrautur.

== Notes ==
- Hallgerður Gísladóttir. Íslensk matarhefð, by Mál og menning (language and Culture Publishing), 1999
