= Library Connect =

Newsletter operated by Elsevier

Library Connect Newsletter
- Categories: Academic, medical, government and corporate librarians
- Frequency: Monthly
- Format: Electronic
- Circulation: Close to 20,000
- Publisher: Elsevier
- Website: libraryconnect.elsevier.com
- ISSN: 1549-3725

Library Connect is a program offered by Elsevier that provides resources and information for librarians in the academic, medical, corporate, and government sectors. The program includes a newsletter, webinars, symposiums, and social media channels with a focus on library practices, issues, trends, and events. Additionally, it promotes Elsevier's products and services.

== Newsletter circulation and content ==
Library Connect Newsletter began publishing in 2003. Until late 2013, the free print newsletter was published three times a year. In 2014, it became a monthly electronic newsletter. The newsletter has approximately 20,000 subscribers (primarily librarians) across 140 countries.

The newsletter accepts article proposals on its website and solicits content from librarians and information industry professionals. Its content and infographics are often shared by librarians and information specialists on blogs, news sites, listservs, and social media.

== Library Connect events ==
Each year, Elsevier collaborates with libraries in various countries to coordinate Library Connect events, including seminars, webcasts, and symposia. In 2012, there were events in 20 countries. The events usually cover emerging trends and best practices within the library community, such as e-books, mobile services, and library marketing. Many Library Connect presentations can be accessed online.

In addition, Library Connect sponsors the Digital Libraries Symposium at the American Library Association midwinter meeting each year. Topics have included mobile technologies and how they affect academic libraries, the new role and image of academic libraries, and next-gen librarians.

In 2013, they began a webinar program.
