= Kiviak =

Little auks fermented in a sealskin, a traditional Greenlandic food

- Alternative names: Kiviaq
- Region or state: Greenland
- Main ingredients: Little auk

Kiviak or kiviaq is a traditional wintertime Inuit food from Greenland that is made of little auks (Alle alle), a type of seabird, fermented in a seal skin.

Making kiviak has traditionally been a community effort in Inughuit culture. Up to 500 whole auks are packed into the seal skin, beaks and feathers included. As much air as possible is removed from the seal skin before it is sewn up and sealed with seal fat, which repels flies. It is then hidden in a heap of stones, with a large rock placed on top to keep the air out. Over the course of three months, the birds ferment, and are then eaten during the Arctic winter, particularly on birthdays and weddings.

The process was featured in the third episode of BBC's Human Planet in 2011.

The anaerobic nature of the fermentation is conducive to botulism. Polar explorer Knud Rasmussen's death is attributed to food poisoning by kiviaq. In August 2013 several people died in Siorapaluk from eating kiviak that was made from eider rather than auk. Eider does not ferment as well as auk, and those who ate it contracted botulism.

== See also ==
- Surströmming – Swedish fermented Baltic Sea herring
- Hákarl – National dish of Iceland consisting of fermented shark
- Igunaq – Method of preparing meat
- Delicacy – Food item considered highly desirable in certain cultures
- List of fermented foods - Food items that are produced by fermentation
