= Svið =

Icelandic dish made from sheep's head

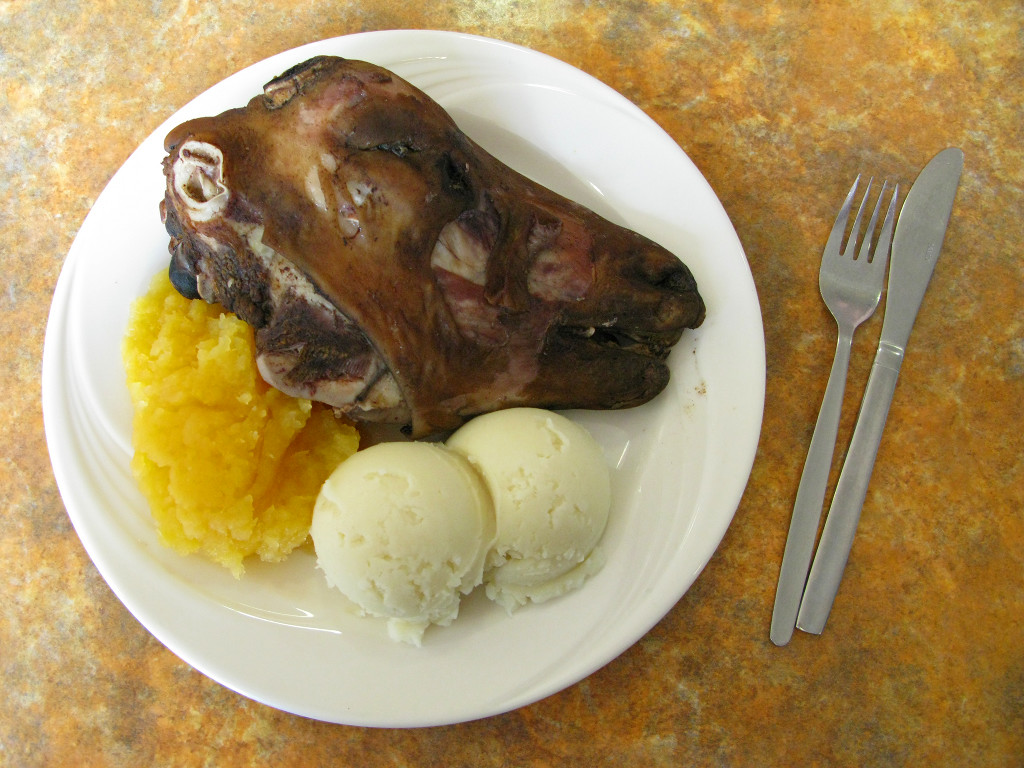
Svið served with mashed potatoes and swede in Reykjavík.

Svið (Icelandic pronunciation: [ˈsvɪːð]; transliterated as svid or svith) is a traditional Icelandic dish consisting of a sheep's head cut in half, singed to remove the fur, and boiled with the brain removed, sometimes cured in lactic acid.

Svið originally arose at a time when people could not afford to let any part of a slaughtered animal go to waste. It is part of þorramatur, a selection of various traditional Icelandic food that is served as a buffet, particularly at the Þorrablót mid-winter festival. It is used as the basis for sviðasulta (head cheese or brawn, made from bits of svið pressed into gelatinous loaves pickled in whey). Similar dishes can also be found in other Western Nordic countries, such as smalahove in Norway and seyðarhøvd on the Faroe Islands.

When eating svið, the ears are sometimes considered taboo due to the superstitious belief that when they (bearing the mark of the animal's owner) are removed, the eater will be accused of theft. It is sometimes held that if the little bone underneath the tongue is not broken, a child that cannot yet speak will remain silent forever. Many Icelanders consider the eye to be the best part of the head.

Lara Weber, writing in the Chicago Tribune, described her experience of eating svið in a 1995 article on Icelandic cuisine:

Never did I expect to taste such a barbaric dish as a sheep's head. But a decade later there it was on my plate, looking up at me with a sorrowful glaze in its eyes. I pulled the jaw apart and stabbed a clump of meat with my fork. When in Iceland... And it wasn't bad. Really. The cheek, where most of the meat is found, was tender and rather tasty. Dipped in a little rhubarb jelly, it was even better. Just beware of the eyes. Those baby blues are considered a delicacy. Well, really, it's the entire eye socket that some Icelanders find so appetizing, with or without the actual eyeball included. So plop that hunk of meat into your mouth and try to think about something else. Anything else.

== Preparation ==
Svið is prepared by first burning off the hair, then cleaning the head under running cold water while paying special attention to the eyes and ears. The head must then be sawn in half lengthwise and the brain removed; if it is frozen first, this is less messy. The brains can be cooked with the skin. When it is ready for cooking, it is put into a cooking pot, sprinkled with coarse salt and partly covered with water. When the water boils, the scum is skimmed off. The head can then be cooked covered for 60 to 90 minutes, until the flesh is cooked through but before it has begun to separate from the bone. It can then be served immediately, hot, or can be left to cool down so that it can be served cold.

== See also ==
- Beshbarmak
- Kale Pache
- Smalahove
- Powsowdie
- List of lamb dishes
