= Þorramatur =

Selection of traditional Icelandic food

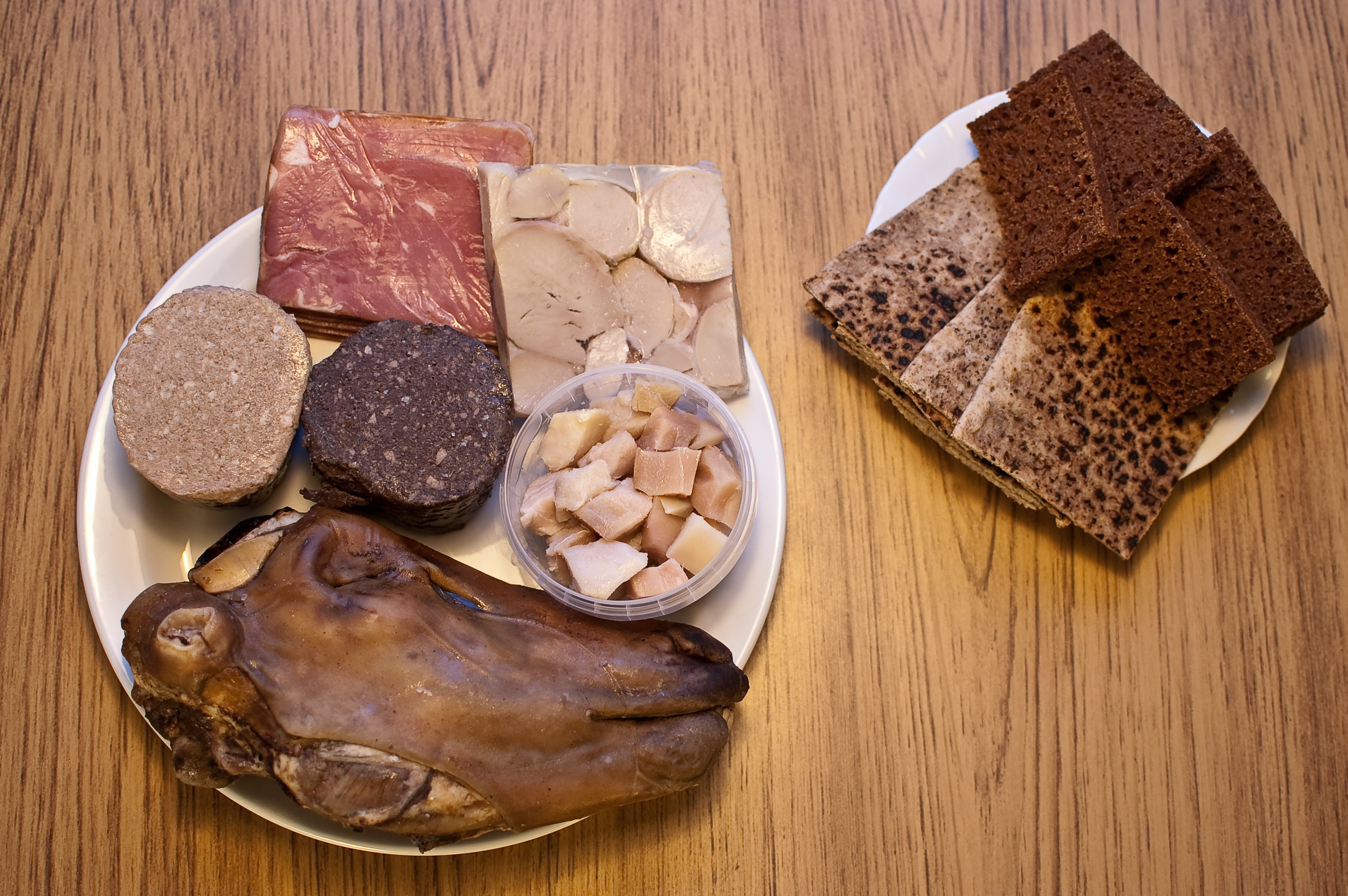
Left (from top to bottom, left to right): Hangikjöt, Hrútspungar, Lifrarpylsa, Blóðmör, Hákarl, Svið. Right: Rúgbrauð (dark brown in color), Flatbrauð

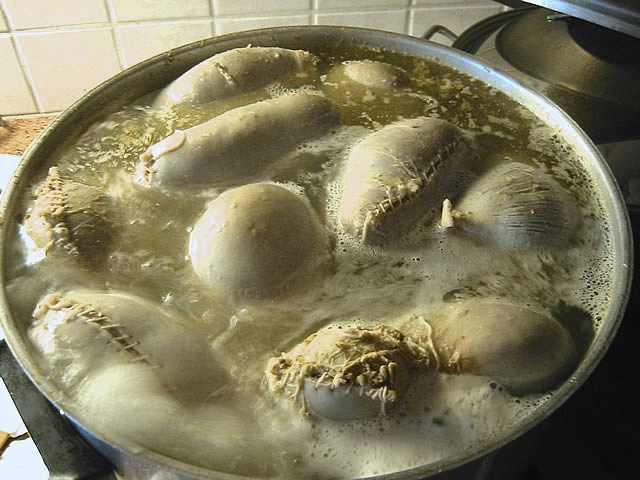
Lifrarpylsa: liver sausage, cooking in a pot

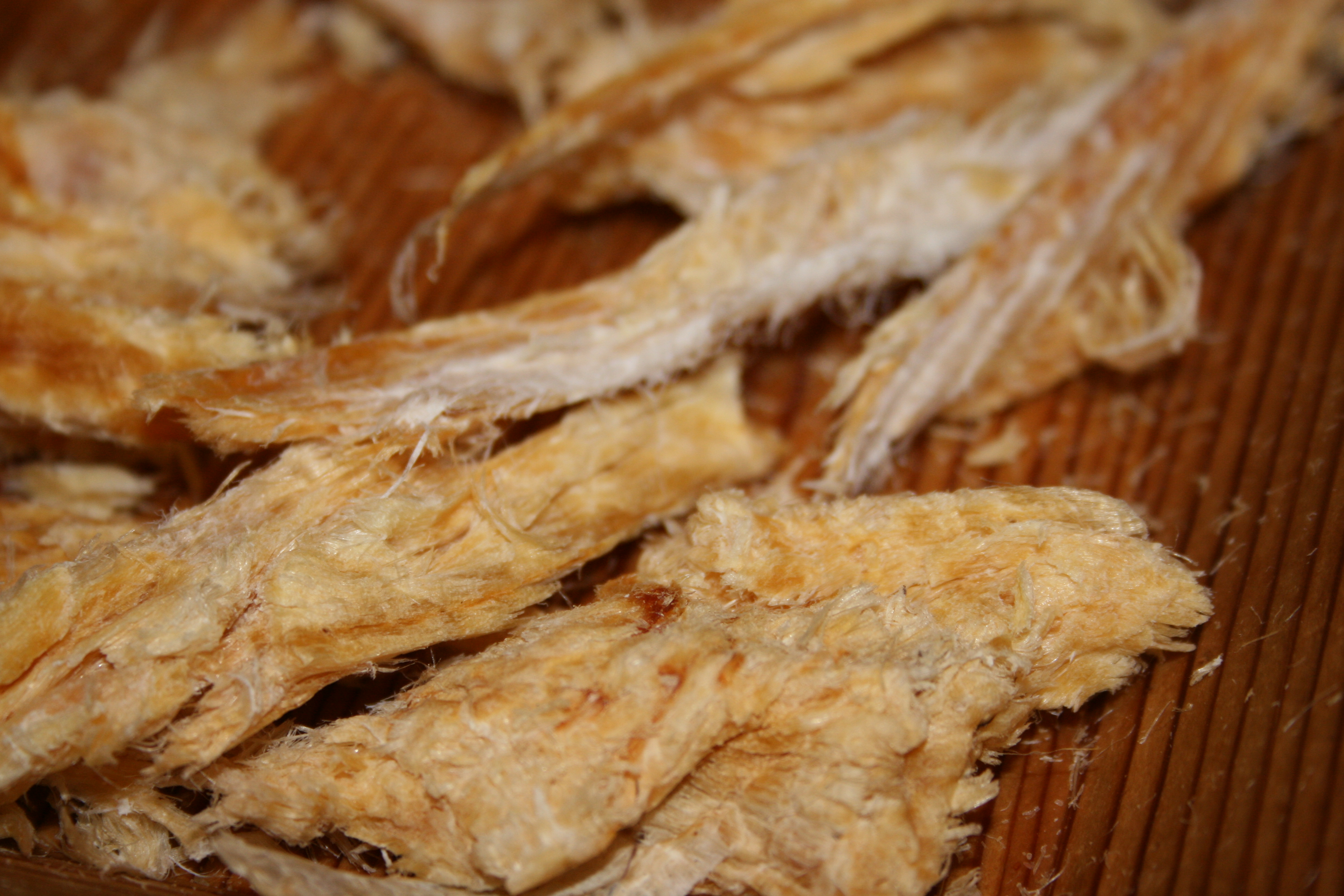
Harðfiskur: wind-dried fish

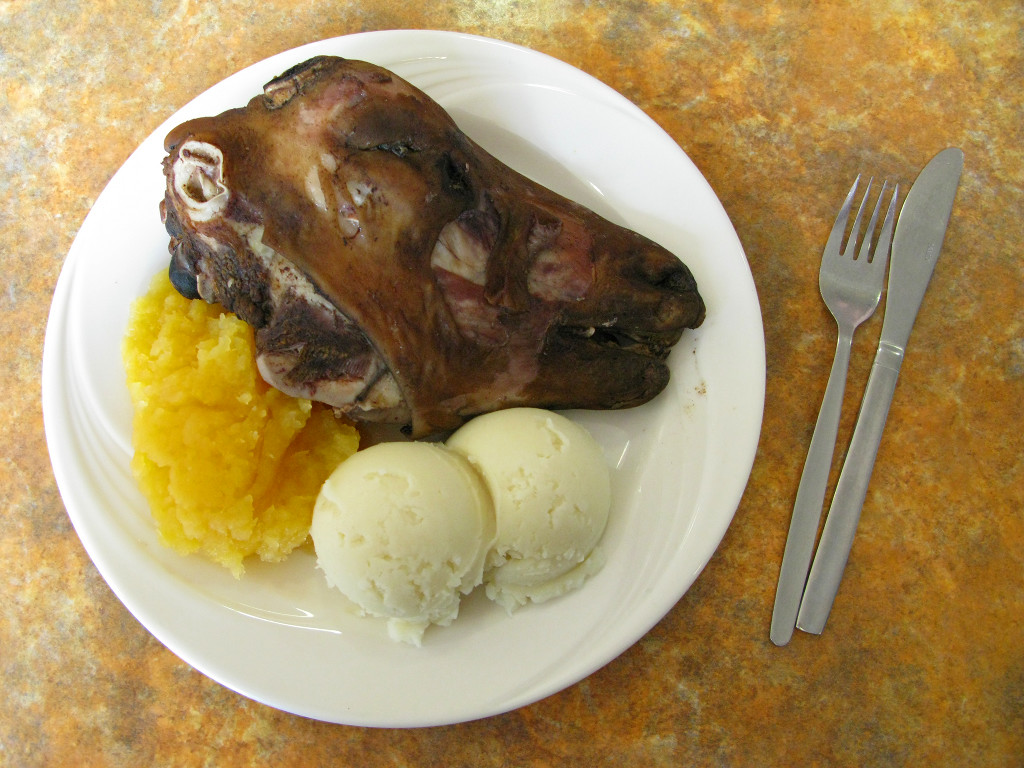
Svið: boiled sheep's head, served here with mashed potatoes and mashed turnips

Þorramatur (Icelandic pronunciation: [ˈθɔrːaˌmaːtʏr̥]; transliterated as thorramatur; lit. 'food of Þorri') is a selection of Icelandic foods, mostly cooked meat and fish products, which are served with a dense rye bread called rúgbrauð, butter and the Icelandic spirit brennivín. Þorramatur is consumed most often between January and March, especially during the mid-winter feast of Þorrablót (Thorrablot).

== History ==
Þorramatur is an example of an invented tradition that first emerged with the midwinter festivals of regional associations of migrants who had moved from the Icelandic countryside to Reykjavík during the urbanisation boom of the post-World War II era. These festivals were very popular in the 1950s and 1960s and some of them are still held every year, although their impact on Reykjavík nightlife has greatly diminished. Sometimes at these events there would be served "Icelandic food" or "Icelandic food by ancient custom". This was usually a buffet of country food, often particular to the region in question and quite familiar to the people attending, but which had become rare on the tables of ordinary city-dwelling Icelanders by the middle of the 20th century.

The idea of connecting this kind of buffet to the month of Þorri and the Þorrablót festivals, which had been held by many student associations since the late 19th century, came from the restaurant Naustið in Reykjavík. In 1958 the restaurant started advertising Þorramatur, which is the first mention of the word in Icelandic texts. The food was served in large wooden troughs, containing enough food for four people, which were copies of old troughs that could be seen at the National Museum of Iceland. The idea, according to the restaurant owner, was to give people who were not members of a regional association the opportunity to taste traditional country food. It was also an attempt to generate business in an otherwise rather dull season for restaurants. The attempt was successful, as the idea immediately caught on and boosted the popularity of Naustið, even though it was quickly copied by other restaurants. Very soon, many of the regional and student associations which organised annual Þorrablót festivals started serving Þorramatur buffets at their events.

Þorramatur has undergone many changes since the 1950s. The great midwinter festivals of associations in Reykjavík have been supplemented by many smaller ones and nowadays even informal family gatherings can be called Þorrablót, which has come to be defined by the serving of Þorramatur, i.e. the consumption of Þorramatur is a necessary and sufficient condition for any kind of party to be called "Þorrablót". Originally, this led to the standardisation of the buffet around a few foods mass-produced by large meat-production houses for the Þorrablót season, whereas previously the food was obtained locally. Not least, Þorrablót festivals have become one of the high points of the year in the countryside and villages around Iceland in the last three decades. Being thus exported from the city to the countryside, the buffet has again come to reflect regional culture and traditions.

Þorramatur has also changed to reflect changing tastes. The traditional method of storing meat by submerging it in fermented whey, which gives the food a characteristic sour taste, is unfamiliar to most generations of Icelanders alive today and therefore a Þorramatur buffet usually has a choice between sour and nonsour pieces of the same food, served on separate trays as the acid readily contaminates food with which it comes into contact. However, some of the food, for example the rams' testicles, has to be cured by the acid before serving. A number of foods have been added to the buffet that have never gone out of fashion in Icelandic cuisine, such as smoked lamb, fermented shark and dried fish, which are still commonly consumed in all seasons. Þorramatur also may include some novelties, traditional food that was strictly regional and even rare as such, and unfamiliar even to the older generation. Examples include seals' flippers, known only from the Breiðafjörður area, which is sometimes, albeit rarely, served as part of Þorramatur.

== Dishes ==
Þorramatur consists of many different foods, including:

- Kæstur hákarl, fermented Greenland shark.
- Súrsaðir hrútspungar, the testicles of rams pressed in blocks, boiled and cured in lactic acid.
- Svið, singed and boiled sheep's heads, sometimes cured in lactic acid.
- Sviðasulta, head cheese or brawn made from svið, sometimes cured in lactic acid.
- Lifrarpylsa (liver sausage), a pudding made from liver and suet of sheep kneaded with rye flour and oats.
- Blóðmör (blood-suet; also known as slátur lit. 'slaughter'), a type of blood pudding made from lamb's blood and suet kneaded with rye flour and oats.
- Harðfiskur, wind-dried fish (often cod, haddock or seawolf), served with butter.
- Rúgbrauð (rye bread), traditional Icelandic rye bread.
- Hangikjöt, (hung meat), smoked and boiled lamb or mutton, sometimes also eaten raw.
- Lundabaggi, sheep's loins wrapped in the meat from the sides, pressed and cured in lactic acid.
- Selshreifar, seal's flippers cured in lactic acid.
- Súr Hvalur, whale blubber pickled in sour milk.
- Rófustappa, mashed turnips.

During the month of þorri, þorri buffets are quite popular in Iceland where many restaurants in Reykjavík and elsewhere serve þorramatur, sometimes on wooden platters, called trog (trough). At these gatherings, Icelandic Brennivín is often consumed in copious amounts. Plastic trays with a selection of þorri delicacies can also be found in supermarkets during midwinter.
