= Lutefisk =

Nordic dried fish dish

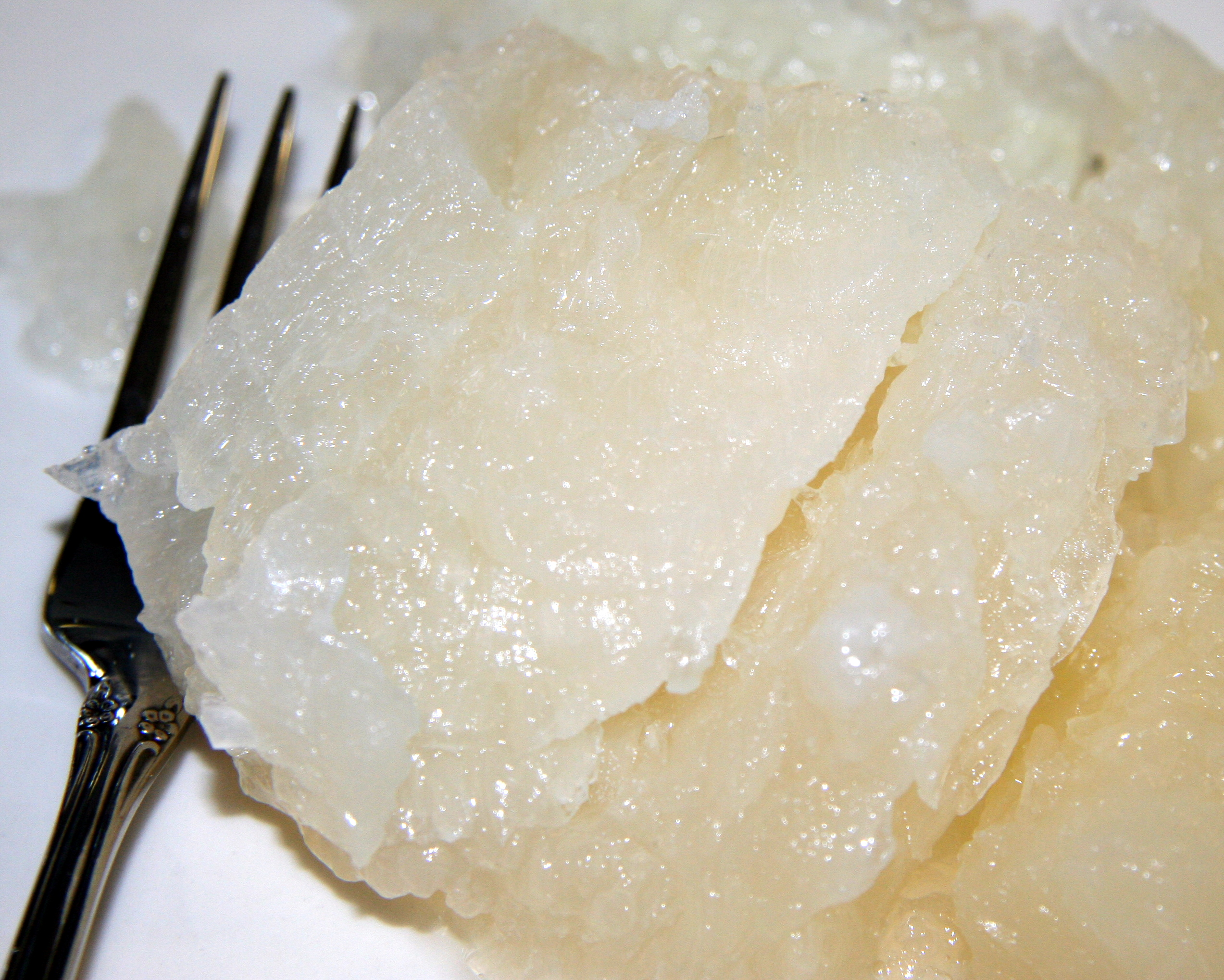
Lutefisk prepared to eat

Lutefisk (Norwegian, pronounced [ˈlʉ̂ːtfɛsk] in Northern and parts of Central Norway, [ˈlʉ̂ːtəˌfɪsk] in Southern Norway; Swedish: lutfisk [ˈlʉ̂ːtfɪsk]; Finnish: lipeäkala [ˈlipeæˌkɑlɑ]; literally "lye fish") is dried whitefish, usually cod, but sometimes ling or burbot, cured in lye. It is made from aged stockfish (air-dried whitefish), or dried and salted cod. The fish takes a gelatinous texture after being rehydrated for days prior to eating.

Lutefisk is prepared as a seafood dish of several Nordic countries. It is traditionally part of the Christmas feasts Norwegian julebord, Swedish julbord, and Finnish joulupöytä.

== Origin ==
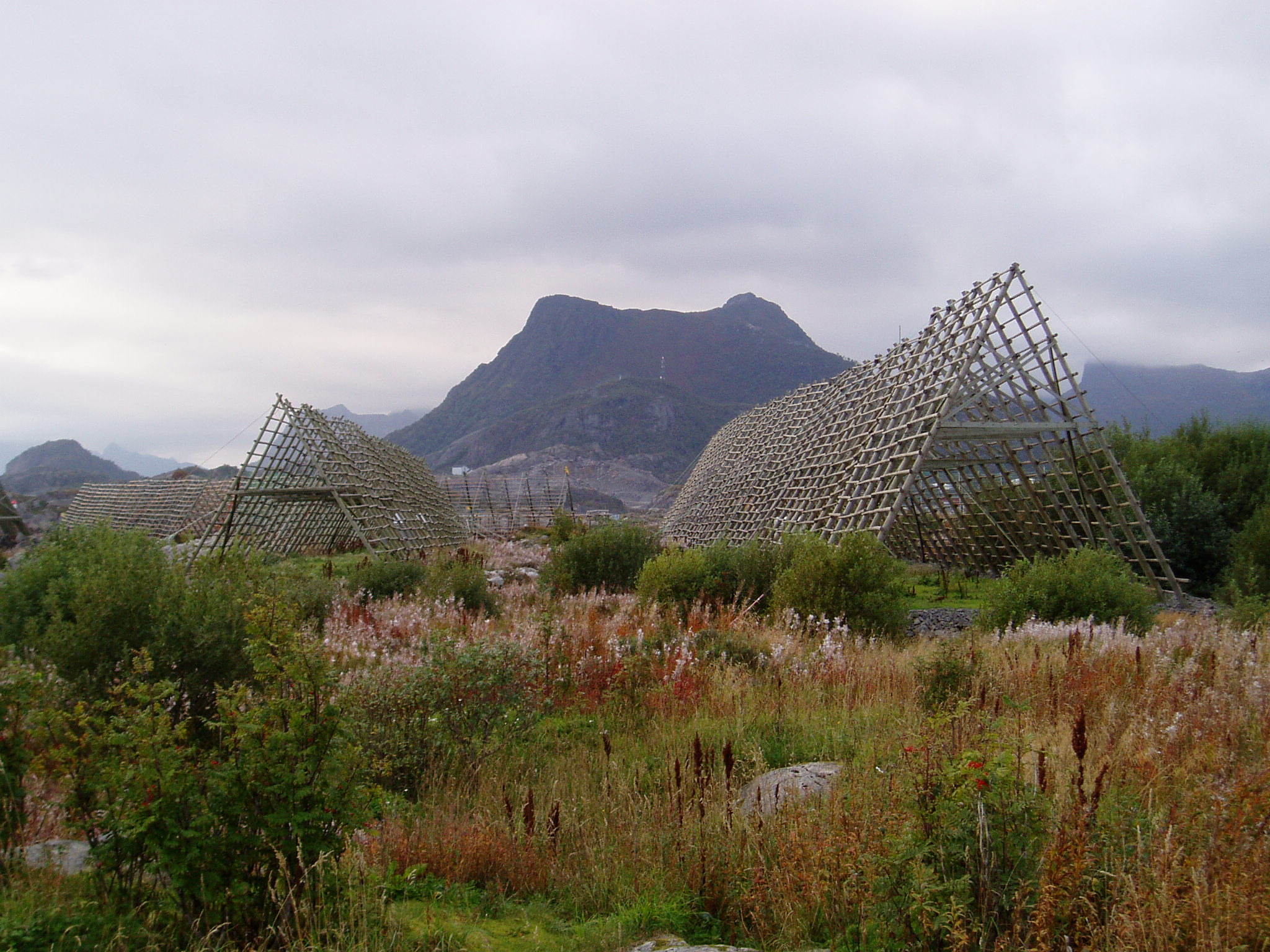
Racks for drying fish in Svolvær, Norway

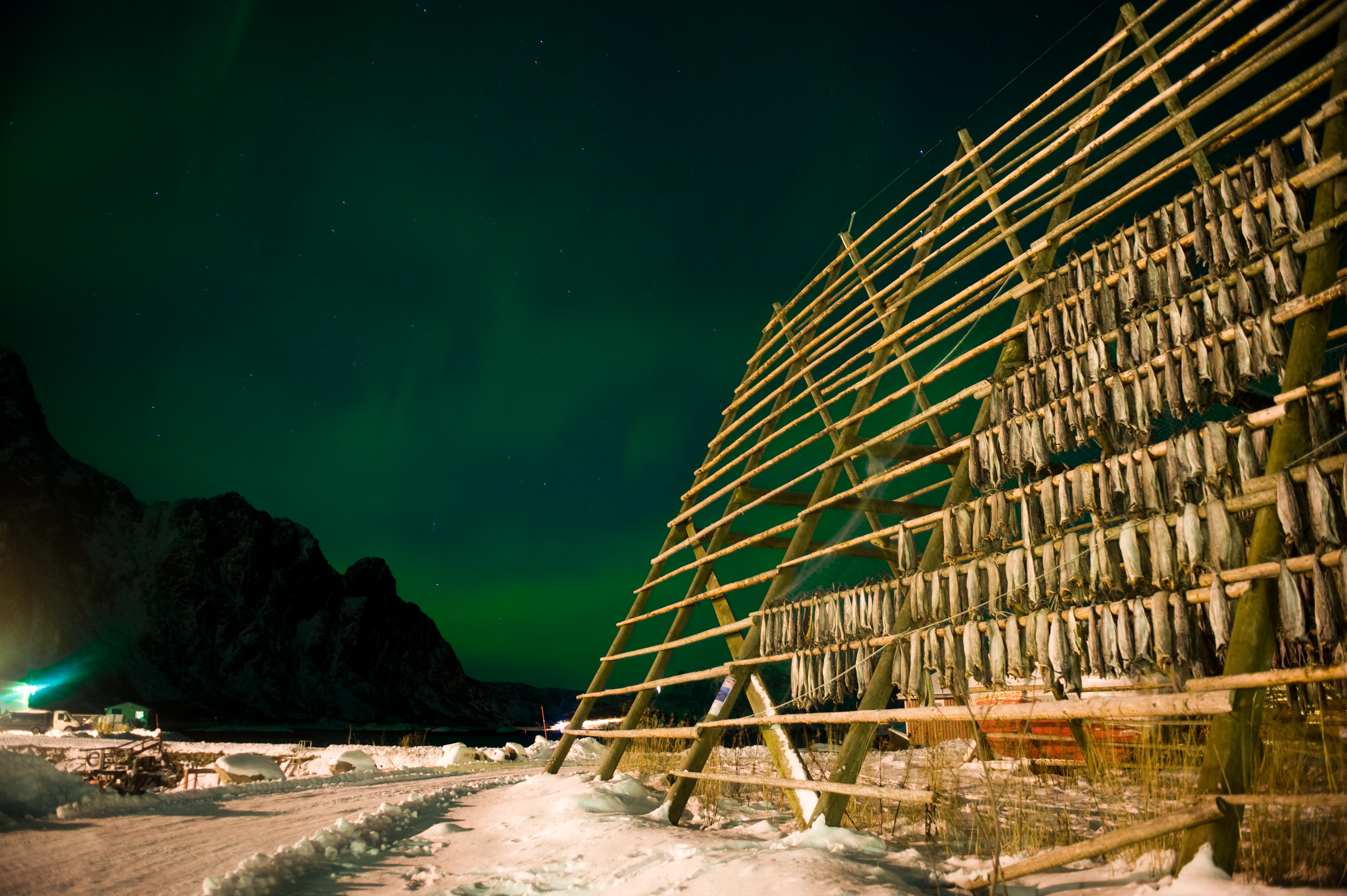
Fish drying in Svolvær, Norway

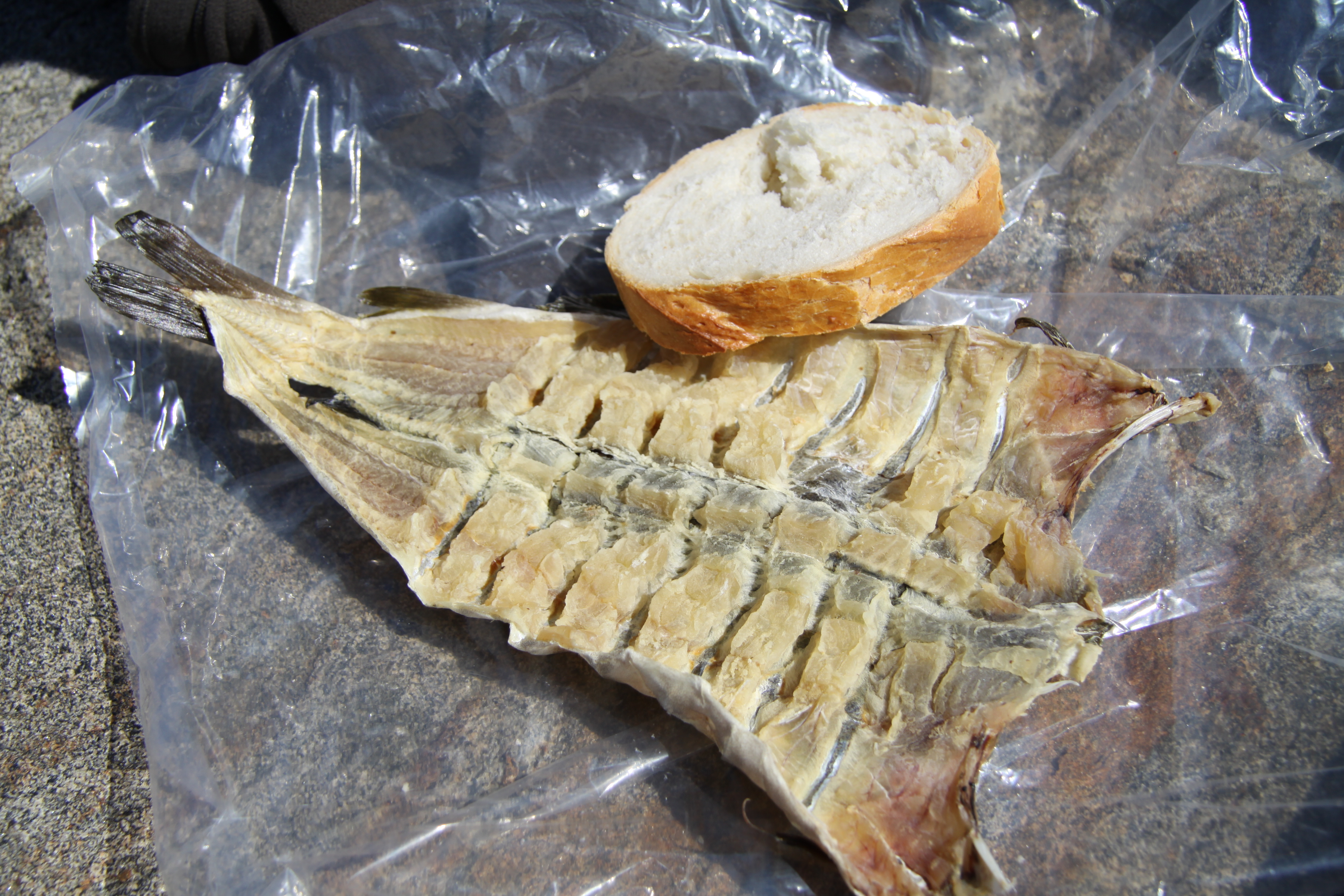
Dried fish

Preserved fish provided protein for generations in a part of the world with a strong fishing tradition. It is not known when people first started treating dried fish with lye. The reason was probably that the lack of major salt deposits in the area favored the drying process for the preservation of whitefish, a process known for millennia.

Stockfish is very nutrient-rich and was consumed domestically, although it was during the boom in the stockfish trade in the late Middle Ages that it became accessible throughout Scandinavia as well as the rest of Europe. Higher-quality stockfish would be soaked in water, then boiled and eaten with melted butter. Lower-quality fish would be harder and require longer boiling, using more fuel; it has been suggested that adding ash from beech or birch to the boiling water would break down the protein chains and speed up the process. The introduction of lye in the preparation process might therefore have been incidental.

== Preparation ==
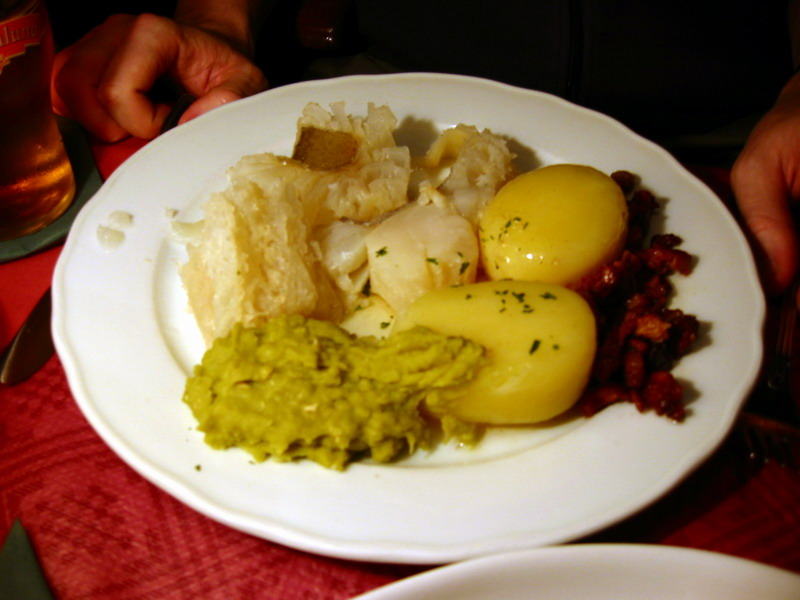
Lutefisk (on the upper left side of the plate) served in a Norwegian restaurant with potatoes, mashed peas, and bacon.

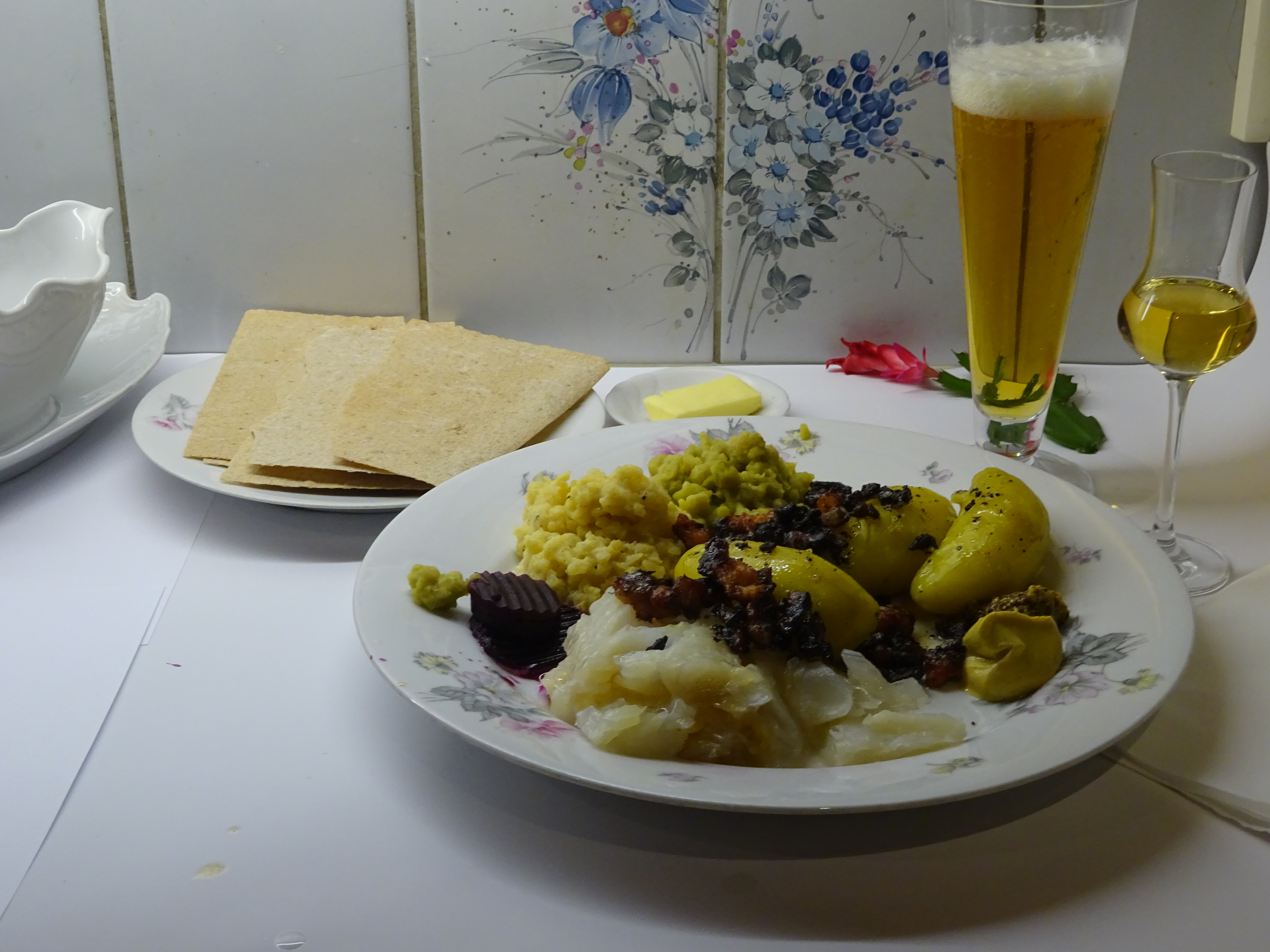
Lutefisk ready to eat.

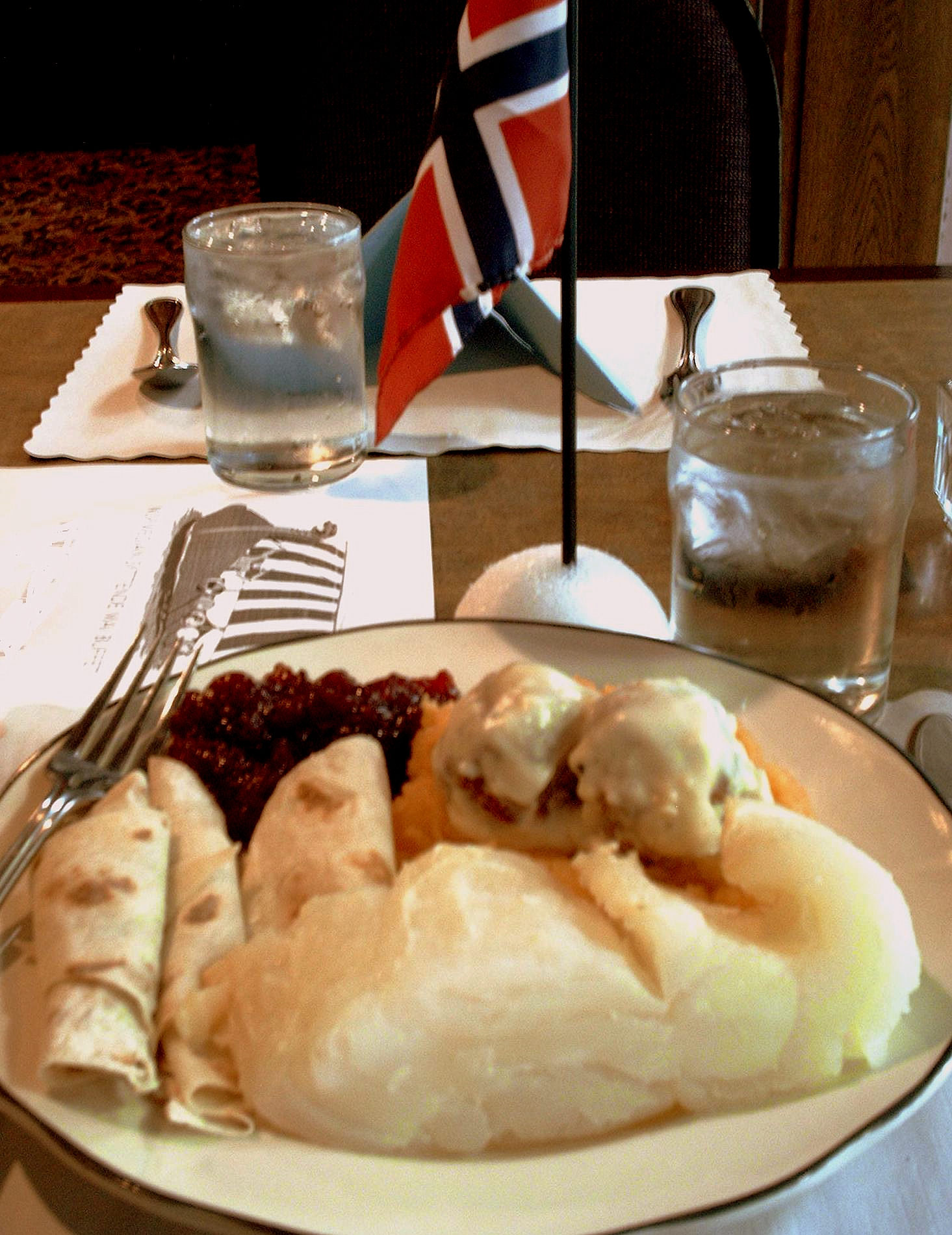
Norwegian Constitution Day dinner in Minnesota, US with lutefisk, lefse, and meatballs (Norwegian: kjøttkaker.

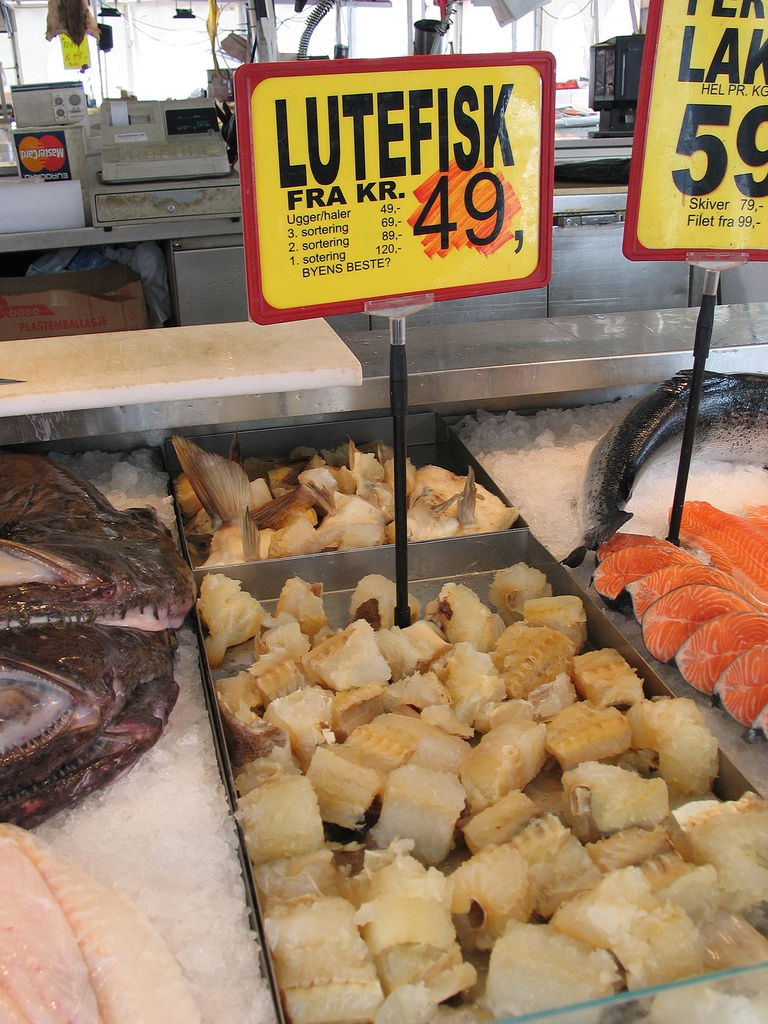
Lutefisk for sale in a Norwegian market.

The first step in preserving is soaking the fish for five to six days, with the water changed daily. The saturated lutefisk is then soaked in an unchanged solution of cold water and lye for an additional two days. The fish swells during this soaking, and its protein content decreases by more than 50 percent, producing a jelly-like consistency.

When this treatment is finished, the fish is saturated with lye and inedible, with a pH of 11–12.

To make the fish edible, a final treatment of another four to six days of soaking in cold water changed daily is needed. The lutefisk is then ready to be cooked.

== Cooking ==
After the preparation, the lutefisk is saturated with water and must therefore be cooked extremely carefully so that it does not fall to pieces.

To create a firm consistency in lutefisk, it is common to spread a layer of salt over the fish about half an hour before it is cooked, to leach some of the water out of the fish meat. The salt must be rinsed off before cooking. Prepared in this way, lutefisk ends up having a non jelly-like consistency, quite similar to that of freshly boiled cod.

Lutefisk does not need additional water for cooking; it is sufficient to place it in a pan, salt it, seal the lid tightly, and let it steam on a very low heat for 20–25 minutes. An alternative is to wrap it in aluminium foil and bake at 225 °C (435 °F) for 40–50 minutes. Another option is to parboil lutefisk, wrapped in cheesecloth, until tender. Lutefisk can also be boiled in water, or cooked in a microwave oven. The typical microwave cooking time for a whole fish, supplied as a package of two sides, is 8 to 10 minutes at high power in a covered dish, depending upon oven power.

== Eating ==
Lutefisk is traditionally served with boiled potatoes, mashed green peas, melted butter and small pieces of fried bacon.

In Norway, Sweden and Finland, lutefisk is a part of the Christmas tradition and is mostly eaten with boiled potatoes, green peas and white sauce. Regional variations include a sprinkle of freshly ground allspice or black pepper and the addition of coarsely ground mustard in the white sauce (in Scania). In parts of Jämtland it is served on flatbread with whey cheese.

In the United States, lutefisk is often served with a variety of side dishes, including bacon, peas, pea stew, potatoes, lefse, gravy, mashed rutabaga, white sauce, melted or clarified butter, syrup, and geitost, or "old" cheese (gammelost). It is sometimes eaten with meatballs, which is not traditional in Scandinavia. Side dishes vary greatly from family to family and region to region, and can be a source of jovial contention when eaters of different traditions of lutefisk dine together.

The taste of well-prepared lutefisk is very mild, and the white sauce is often spiced with pepper or other strong-tasting spices. In Minnesota and Wisconsin, this method (seasoned with allspice) is common among Swedish-Americans, while Norwegian-Americans often prefer to eat it unseasoned with melted butter or cream sauce.

== Modern consumption ==
Lutefisk as a Christmas season meal has gained attention in Norway over the past 20 years. The Norwegian Seafood Export Council indicated sales of lutefisk to restaurants and catering companies in Norway increased by 72% between 2005 and 2008. A 2005 survey found 20% of Norwegians ate lutefisk during the Christmas holiday season, although only 3% would consider it for their Christmas dinner.

Madison, Minnesota, US has dubbed itself the "lutefisk capital of the world" as well as claiming the largest per capita consumption of lutefisk in Minnesota. St. Olaf College in Northfield, Minnesota serves lutefisk during their Christmas Festival concerts.

Lutefisk is eaten in Canada, which has a relatively large population of Scandinavian heritage particularly in the traditionally agricultural, western inland provinces. As of 2016, there were about 463,000 Norwegian Canadians, 350,000 Swedish Canadians, 207,000 Danish Canadians and 143,000 Finnish Canadians. Organizations such as the Sons of Norway hold annual lutefisk dinners. Lutefisk is sometimes available in specialty stores and supermarkets where there are large Scandinavian populations. Kingman, Alberta proclaims itself on its greeting sign to be the "Lutefisk capital of Alberta."

== Folklore ==
An article in Smithsonian magazine quotes some oft-rendered tall tales regarding the origins of the dish:

A legend has it that Viking fishermen hung their cod to dry on tall birch racks. When some neighboring Vikings attacked, they burned the racks of fish, but a rainstorm blew in from the North Sea, dousing the fire. The remaining fish soaked in a puddle of rainwater and birch ash for months before some hungry Vikings discovered the cod, reconstituted it and had a feast.

Jokes and humor about lutefisk have been cited as prevalent among Scandinavian-Americans, such as "I have tried lutefisk twice, once going down, and another time coming back up."

The Season 3 King of the Hill episode "Revenge of the Lutefisk" features a plot where a new minister, Karen Stroup (Mary Tyler Moore), brings a dish of lutefisk to church to share a "Minnesotan tradition" in Texas. Bobby Hill secretly eats all the lutefisk, then has bad diarrhea in the church bathroom the next morning. To hide the smell, he lights a match and tosses the match in the garbage, thus accidentally burning the church down, which Stroup perceives as arson and a hate crime.

== Spellings ==
- Danish: ludfisk or ludefisk
- Norwegian: lutefisk (earlier ludefisk spelling still sometimes used in English) or lutfisk
- Swedish: lutfisk
- Finnish: lipeäkala or livekala
- Northern Sami: lovttaguolli

== See also ==
- Bacalhau – Type of Portuguese cod dish: Portuguese dish also made of reconstituted dried fish.
- Baccalà, also known as clipfish – Preserved fish
- Fish and brewis – Canadian dish
- Hákarl – National dish of Iceland consisting of fermented shark
- Surströmming – Swedish fermented Baltic Sea herring
- Þorramatur – Selection of traditional Icelandic food

== Other sources ==
- Gary Legwold (1996) The Last Word on Lutefisk: True Tales of Cod and Tradition (Conrad Henry PR) ISBN 9780965202701
- Mark Kurlansky Walker (1998) Cod: A Biography of the Fish That Changed the World (Penguin Books) ISBN 978-0140275018
