= Brännvin =

Nordic style distilled liquor

Brännvin

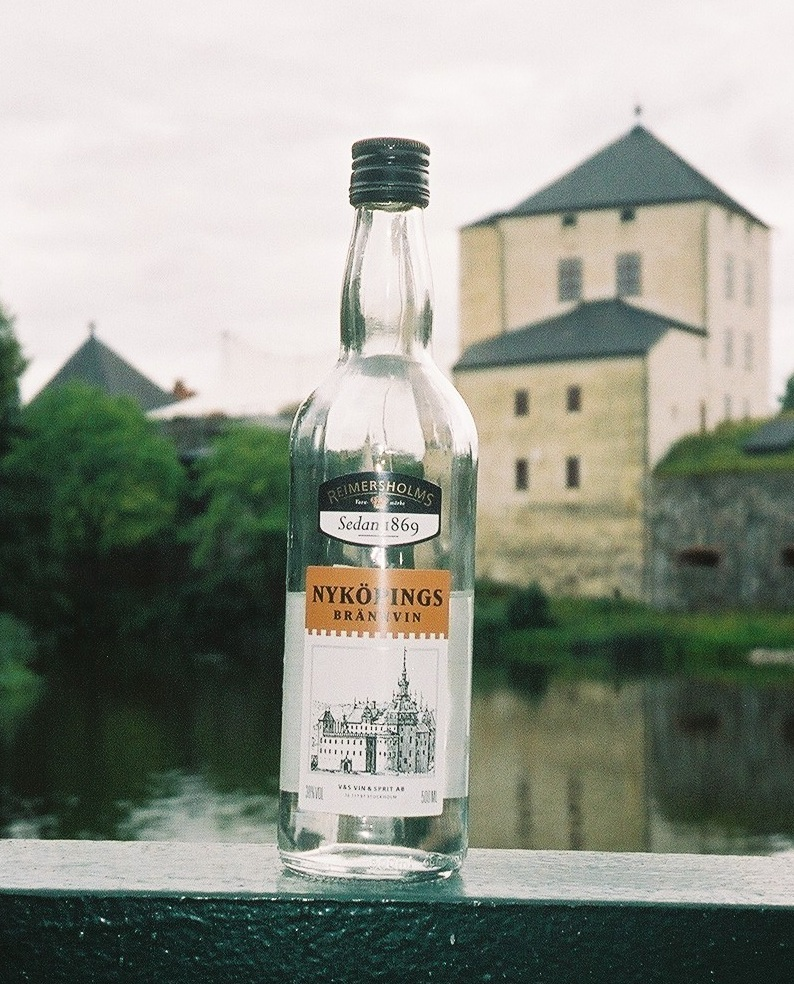
A bottle of brännvin

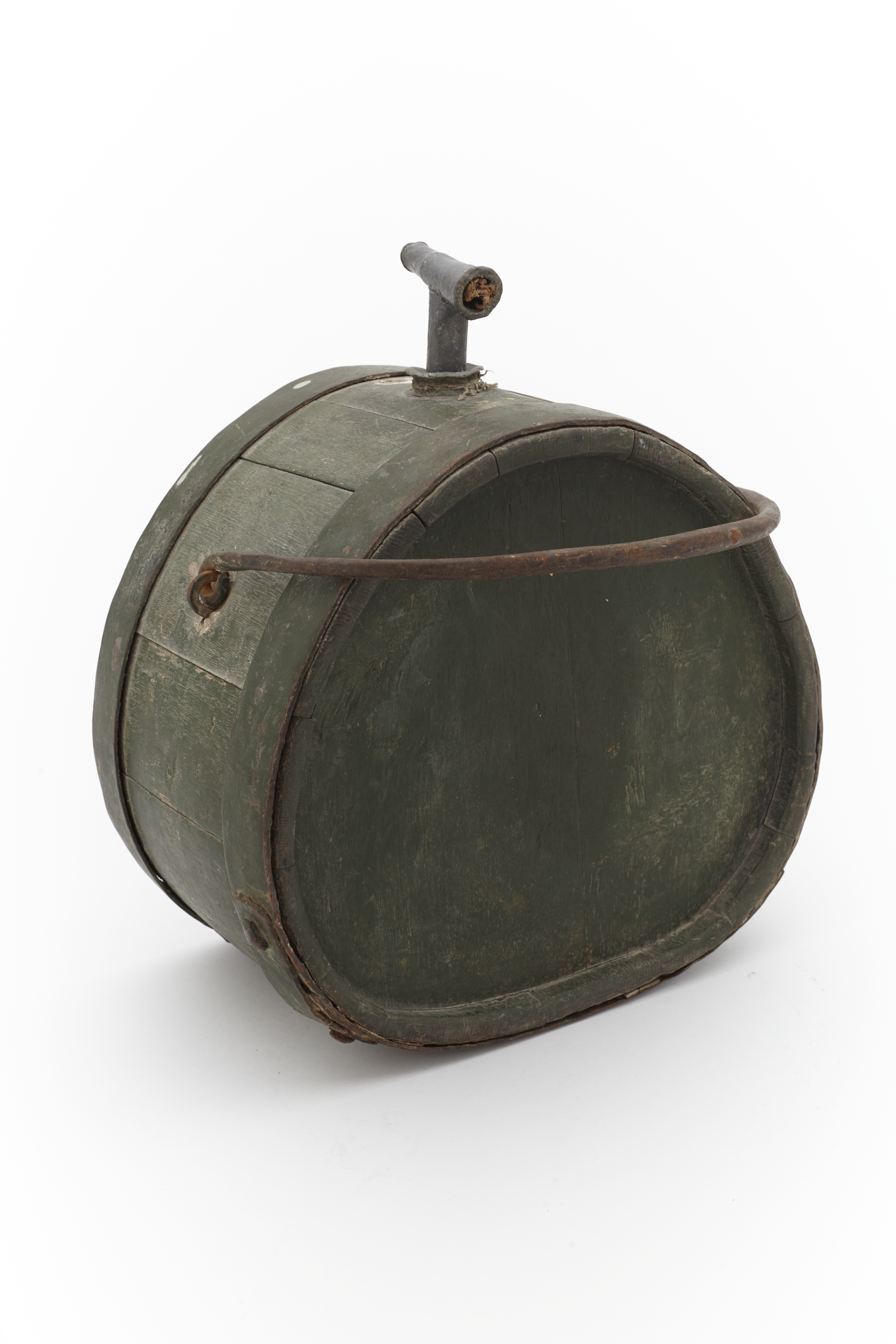
An old brännvin keg

Brännvin (Swedish spelling; see § Etymology) is an old Nordic term for distilled liquor, generally from potatoes, grain, or (formerly) wood cellulose etc., and is today primarily used as a name for "Nordic-style" spirits, and then mainly divided into unspiced and spiced brännvin. Beverages labelled brännvin are usually plain and have an alcohol content between 30% and 38%.

It can be plain and colourless, or flavoured with herbs and spices, such as akvavit. The common style of brännvin in Iceland, spiced with caraway – brennivín, although not unique to the country, is considered to be Iceland's signature distilled beverage.

== Etymology ==
The term brännvin is analogous between the Nordic languages, only differing slightly from language to language: Danish: brændevin, Faroese: brennivín, Icelandic: brennivín, Norwegian: brennevin, Swedish: brännvin. In Finnish, the name was originally also analogous, as paloviini or paloviina, but has since been shortened to just viina.

The word means "burn[t] (distilled) wine", stemming from Middle Low German: bernewin (Old Swedish: brænnevin). It also exists in Dutch: brandewijn, Afrikaans: brandewyn and German: Branntwein, gebrannter Wein, ultimately cognate to brandy(wine), also French: brandevin.

== In Scandinavian culture ==
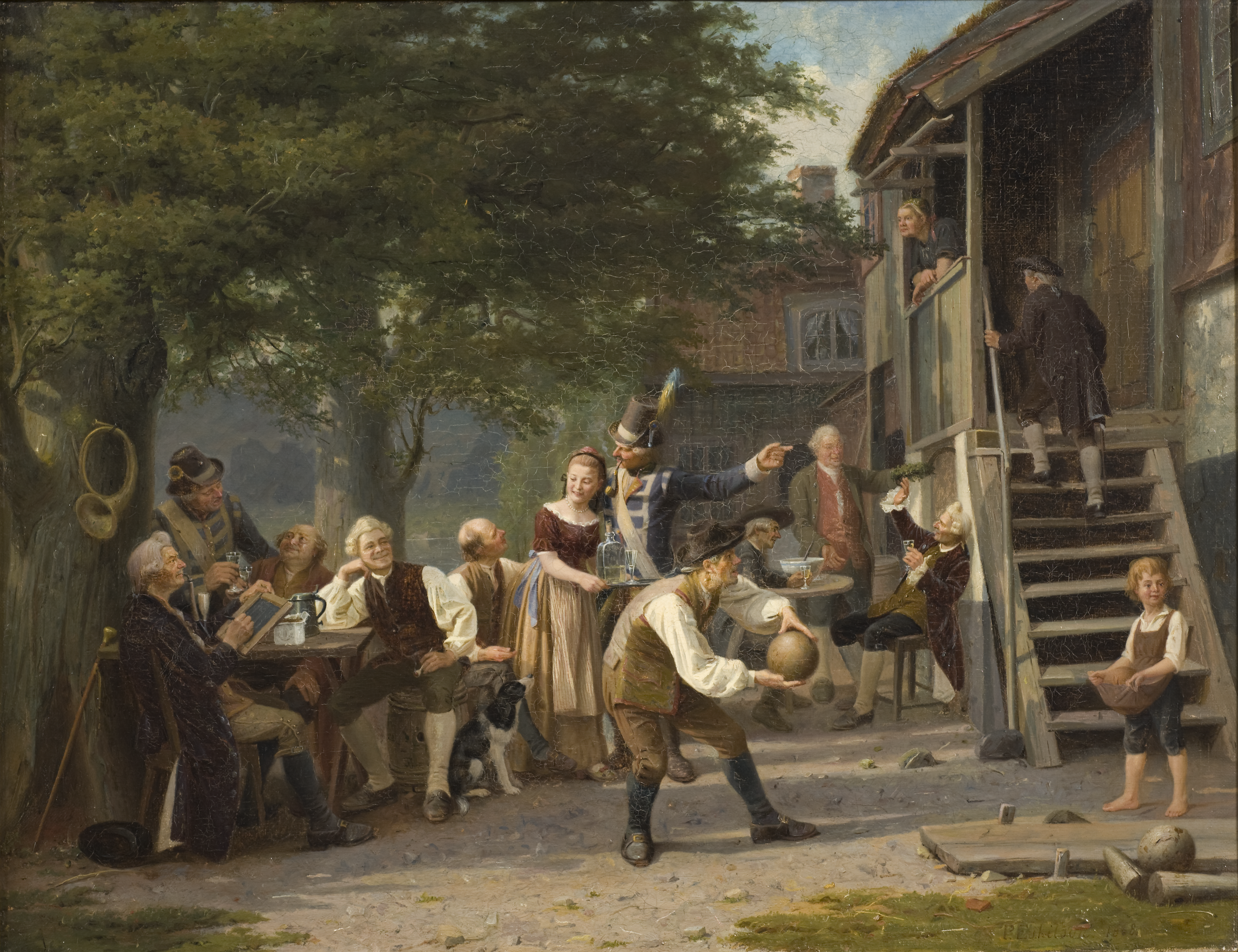
Skittles at Faggen's. Drinking scene with a bottle of brännvin from Carl Michael Bellman's Fredman's Epistle no. 55, by Peter Eskilson, 1868.

A small glass of brännvin is traditionally called a snaps (Finnish: snapsi; compare German: Schnaps), although not in Iceland. In Sweden, and among Swedish-speaking Finns, such is commonly accompanied by a drinking song, called snapsvisa.

Brännvin was central to the semi-mythical world in the songs of Swedish composer Carl Michael Bellman. For example, in Fredman's Epistle no. 1, the first verse begins:

Swedish	Translation
Gutår, båd’ natt och dag! Ny vällust, nytt behag! Fukta din aska! Fram, brännvinsflaska! Lydom Bacchi lag!	Cheers, both night and day! New pleasure, new delight! Moisten your ash(-dry throat)! Forth, brännvin-bottle! Let us obey Bacchus's law!

== Swedish history ==
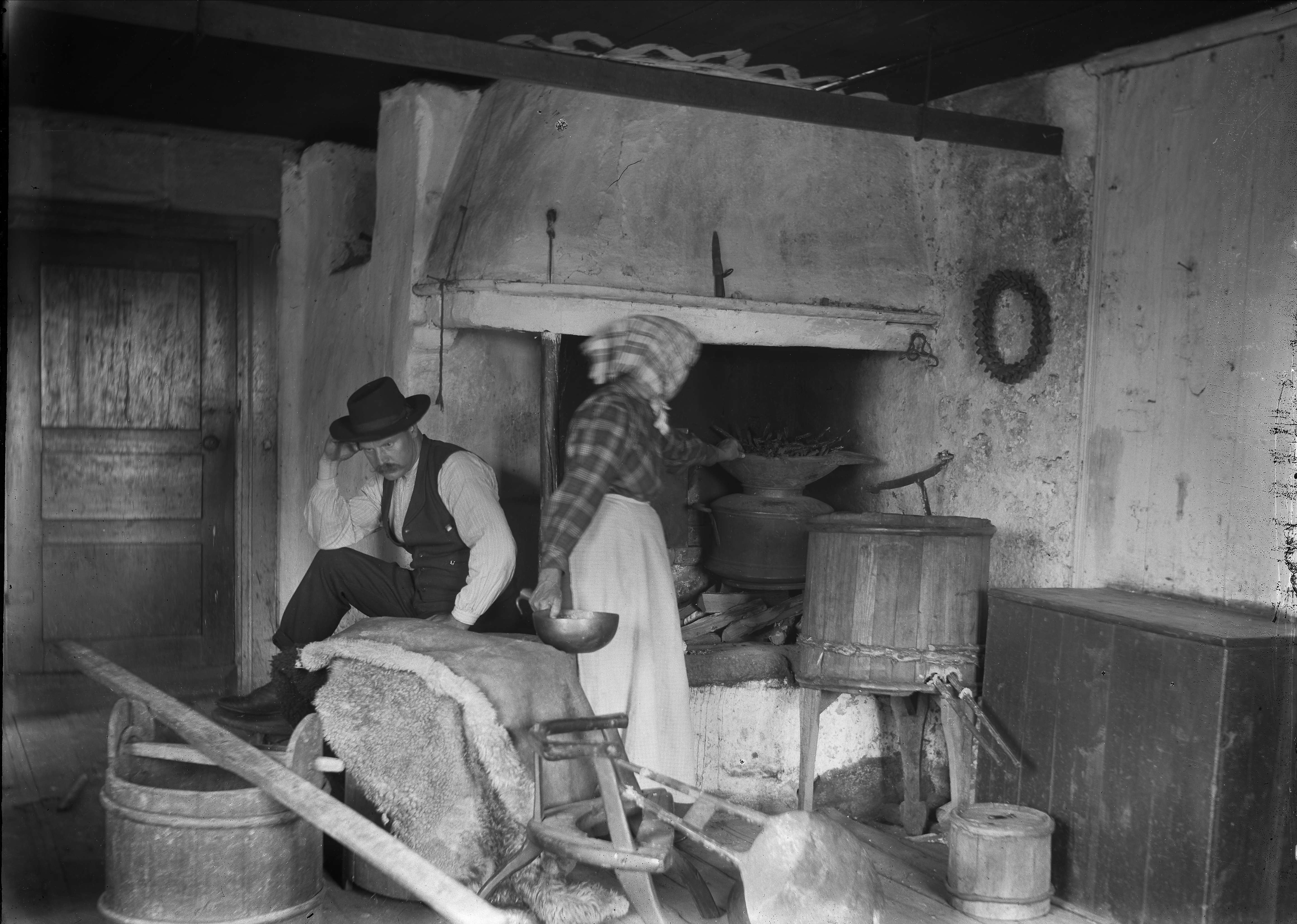
Brännvin distillation, 1910s

Brännvin has been produced in Sweden since the late 15th century, although the total production was still small in the 17th century. From the early 18th century, production expanded, although production was prohibited several times, during grain shortages. Although initially a grain product, potatoes started to be used in production in the late 18th century and became dominant from the early 19th century. From the early 1870s, distillery equipment was improved.

Progressively from the 1960s, unflavoured Swedish brännvin also came to be called vodka. The first Swedish product to use this term was Explorer Vodka, which was created in 1958 and initially was intended for the American export market. Although it ultimately failed in that market, it remains one of the most popular vodka brands in Sweden today. In 1979, Absolut Vodka was launched, reusing the name of the old Absolut Rent Brännvin ("absolutely pure brännvin") created in 1879.

== Outside Scandinavia ==
In the US, a Chicago producer makes a bitter brännvin (beskbrännvin), called Jeppson's Malört. "Malört" (pronounced [ˈmɑ̂ːlœʈ]) is the Swedish word for the plant Artemisia absinthium, wormwood, often used as an ingredient in absinthe.

== See also ==
- Koskenkorva Viina
- Alcoholic beverages in Sweden
