= Brennivín =

Icelandic distilled alcoholic beverage

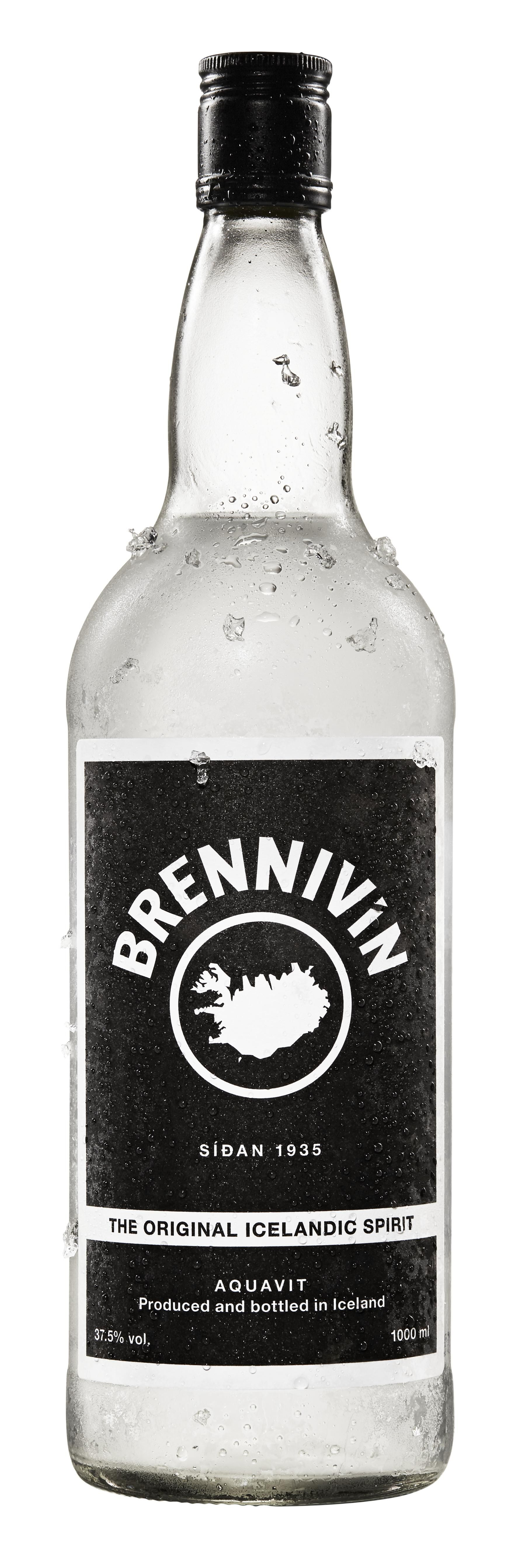
BRENNIVÍN AQUAVIT, 37.5 ABV

Brennivín (Icelandic pronunciation: [ˈprɛnːɪˌviːn]), the common style of brännvin in Iceland, is considered to be the country's signature distilled beverage. It is distilled from fermented grain mash, combined with Iceland's very soft, high-pH water, and flavored only with caraway. A clear, savory, herbal spirit, it is often described as having notes of fresh rye bread. It is considered to be a type of aquavit and bottled at 37.5% ABV (75 proof). Steeping herbs in alcohol to create schnapps is a long-held folk tradition in Nordic countries, and Brennivín remains the traditional drink for the mid-winter feast of Þorrablót. Today, Icelanders typically drink it chilled, as a shot, with a beer, or as a base for cocktails. It often replaces gin in classic cocktails, or lighter rum in tropical drinks.

== Etymology ==
Icelandic: Brennivín, along its sister languages, Danish: brændevin, Faroese: brennivín, Norwegian: brennevin, Swedish: brännvin (Finnish: Viina), is an old Nordic term for distilled liquor, generally from potatoes, grain, or (formerly) wood cellulose etc. The word means "burn[t] (distilled) wine", and stems from Middle Low German: bernewin (found in Old Swedish as brænnevin). It also exists in Dutch: brandewijn (Afrikaans: brandewyn) and German: Branntwein, gebrannter Wein, ultimately cognate to brandy(wine), also French: brandevin.

== History ==
The history of Brennivín is tied to Iceland's history. Iceland was settled in the late ninth century by Norwegian and Celtic people. In 1262, Icelanders became subjects of the king of Norway. In 1397, the Kalmar Union between the Nordic countries put Iceland (along with Norway, Greenland, and the Faroe Islands) under the Danish crown. Although beer could not easily survive the ocean journey, malt and honey were freely traded between Scandinavia and Iceland. Icelanders could make their own mead and, occasionally, beer.

However, in 1602 the Danish King instituted a trade monopoly, the "Einokunarverslun", in Iceland. Only certain Danish merchants could trade with Iceland, and Icelanders could not trade with anyone else. Mead, beer, honey, and malt took up valuable space on the ships. Spirits, though, took up less space, did not spoil, and could be sold for a much higher price. The distillation techniques of the day (known as "burning") meant that the resulting spirits (known as "burnt wine" or "brann-vin") were often less than appealing. One way to improve the taste was to infuse the spirits with herbs. Even in Iceland's harsh climate, caraway was available and used to flavor shipments of spirits from Denmark. This combination led to the introduction of Brennivín.

The trade monopoly ended in 1786, and thirty years later, modern distillation techniques reached Scandinavia. By then, the taste for various aquavits had already been well established in all the Nordic countries. Cleaner spirits were available, but people still preferred them flavored with herbs. Although the trade monopoly was no longer in place, the Danish Distilling Company maintained a monopoly on distillation in Denmark and the territories it controlled, including Iceland. Icelanders were forbidden to distill their own spirits. In 1908, Iceland held a referendum on prohibition. Starting in 1912, all alcohol imports ceased. Any remaining stocks of alcoholic beverages had to be consumed or destroyed by 1915. In 1918 Iceland regained its independence from Denmark. Absent prohibition, the Danish monopoly on distillation would no longer apply. In 1935, prohibition was partially repealed. Once again, spirits would be allowed, but production, distribution, and sale would be controlled by the now-independent government. Beer would remain illegal until March 1, 1989.

As the Icelanders were no longer captive to the Danish Distilling Company, they could make whatever they wished. The Icelandic government established the State Alcohol Company of Iceland, known as the "AVR", which still exists today as the "ATVR". One of the few spirits the AVR began producing was caraway-flavored Brennivín. Unlike the colorful French and Italian spirit labels of the time, the Icelandic government demanded a stark black-and-white label for the newly legal spirit. The green bottle displayed a white skull on the black label to warn against consumption (later replaced by a map of Iceland and a clear bottle). Therefore, it was sometimes called "svarti dauði" (black death). The intention was for the drink to be visually unappealing in order to limit demand, but it did not work. For decades, Brennivín was Icelanders' drink of choice and became a pop-culture treasure travelers brought home. In 2014, it was legally imported into the United States.

== Serving ==
Brennivín is typically served cold as a shot, with a beer, or as a base for cocktails. It often replaces gin in classic cocktails or lighter rum in tropical drinks. It is also the traditional accompaniment to the uniquely Icelandic hákarl, a fermented shark meat.

== Branding ==
Various Icelandic distilleries produce different brands of Brennivín, each with its own character; they remain loyal to the state-owned monopoly ÁTVR's once-produced version of Brennivín.

== Availability outside Iceland ==
Brennivín exports from Iceland to the United States began in early 2014. Export to Germany and Canada followed, as well as sales to Denmark, Sweden and Norway.

== In popular culture ==
- In music:
  - The Foo Fighters song, "Skin and Bones" prominently mentions Brennivín ("All worn out and nothing fits, Brennivín and cigarettes, The more I give the less I get, But I'm all set") and Dave Grohl often wears a Brennivín T-shirt.
  - "Brennivin" is a song on the Seal Beach EP by the The Album Leaf project.
  - A song "Brennivin" appears on the Faroese band Týr's album, Land.
- In films and television:
  - Icelandic films such as Kristnihald undir Jökli, Land og synir, Stuttur Frakki, Djöflaeyjan, Ingaló, Cold Fever, and others have featured the drink.

== See also ==
- Akvavit
- Moonshine by country § Iceland
