= Hákarl =

National dish of Iceland consisting of fermented shark

Kæstur hákarl
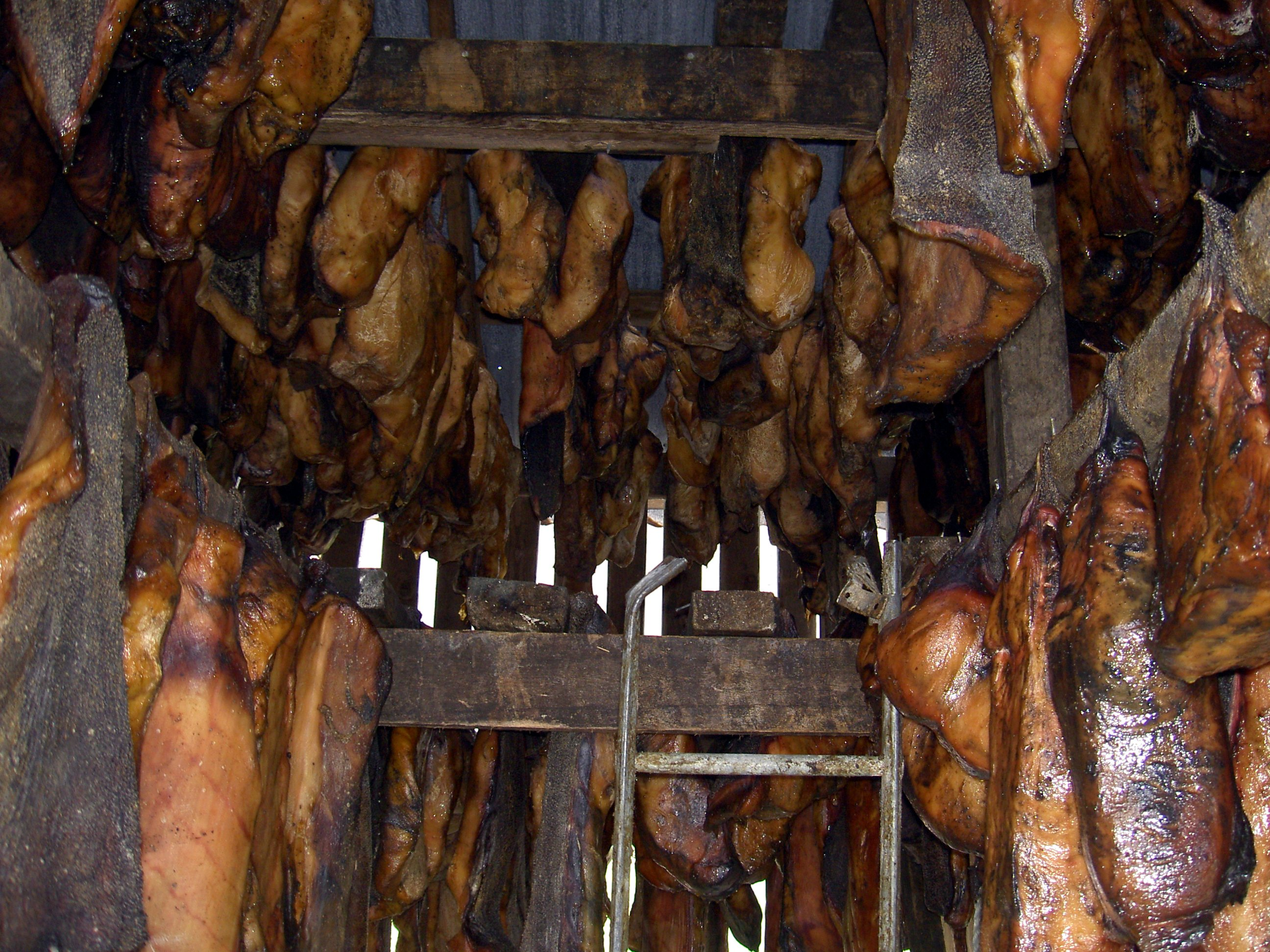
- Fermented shark hanging to dry in the Stykkishólmur region
- Alternative names: Hákarl
- Type: Fermented fish
- Course: Þorramatur at þorrablót
- Place of origin: Iceland
- Associated cuisine: Brennivín
- Main ingredients: Greenland shark
- Variations: Glerhákarl and skyrhákarl
- Similar dishes: Kiviak

Hákarl (short for kæstur hákarl [ˈkʰaistʏr ˈhauːˌkʰa(r)tl̥]), referred to as fermented shark in English, is a national dish of Iceland consisting of Greenland shark or other sleeper shark that has been cured with a particular fermentation process and hung to dry for four to five months. It has a strong ammonia-rich smell and fishy taste, making hákarl an acquired taste.

Fermented shark is readily available in Icelandic stores and may be eaten year-round, but is most often served as part of a Þorramatur, a selection of traditional Icelandic food served at the midwinter festival þorrablót. The consumption, hunting, and bycatch of Greenlandic sharks has been criticized for its unsustainability, as the species takes 150 years to reach sexual maturity, with some individuals living up to 400 years.

== Consumption ==
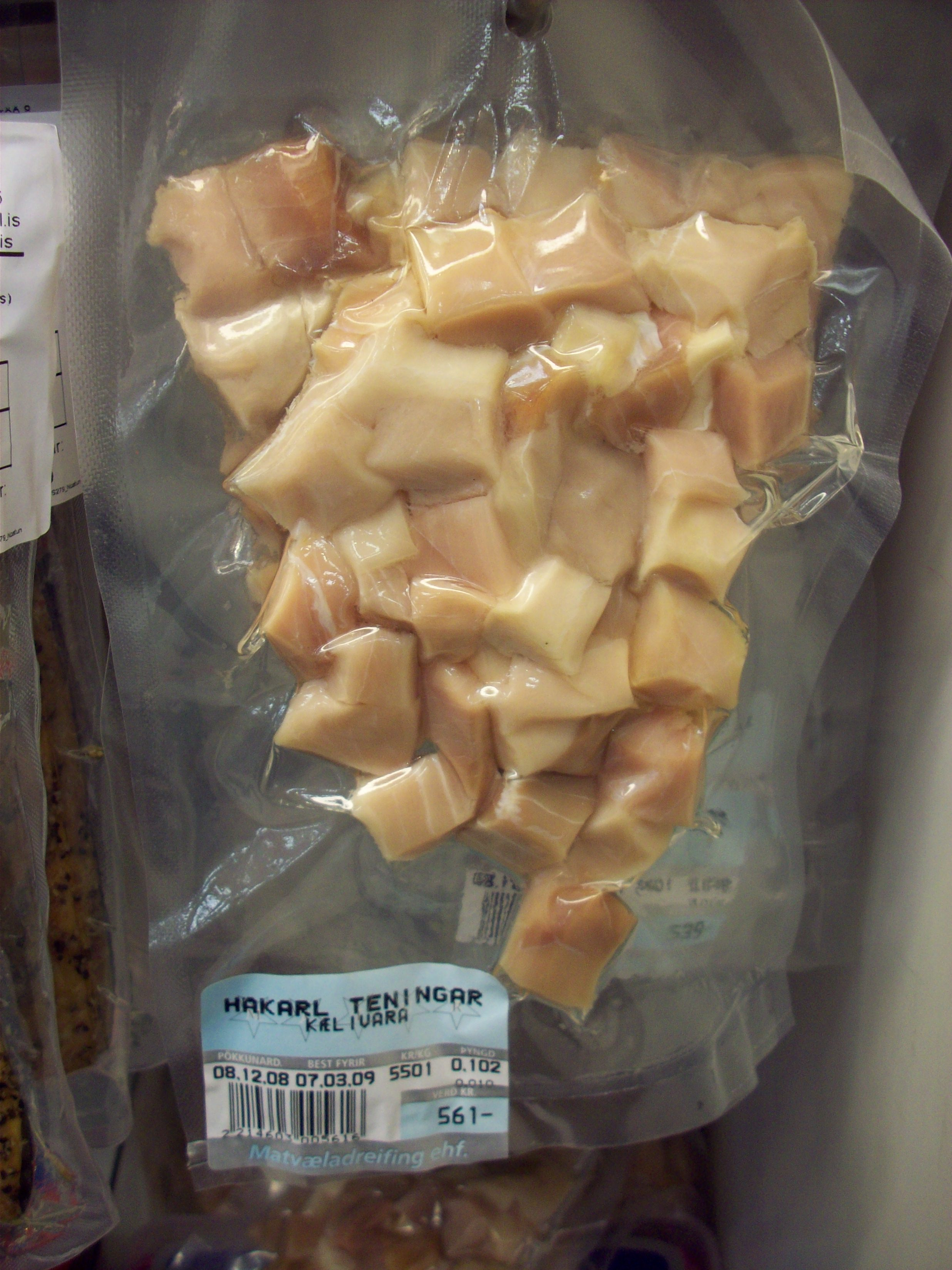
Fermented shark in a store

Fermented shark contains a large amount of ammonia and has a strong smell, similar to that of many cleaning products. It is often served in tiny cubes on toothpicks. Those new to it may gag involuntarily at the first attempt to eat it because of the high ammonia content. First-timers are sometimes advised to pinch their nose while taking the first bite, as the odor is much stronger than the taste. It is often eaten with a shot of the local spirit, a type of akvavit called brennivín.

Hákarl comes in two varieties: chewy and reddish glerhákarl ([ˈklɛːrˌhauːˌkʰa(r)tl̥], lit. "glassy shark") from the belly, and white and soft skyrhákarl ([ˈskɪːr-], lit. "skyr shark") from the body.

== Preparation ==
The meat of the Greenland shark is poisonous when fresh because of its high urea and trimethylamine oxide content. However, when properly processed, it may be consumed safely.

The traditional method begins with gutting and beheading a shark and placing it in a shallow hole dug in gravelly sand, with the cleaned cavity resting on a small mound of sand. The shark is then covered with sand and gravel, and stones are placed on top of the sand in order to press the fluids out of the body. The shark ferments in this fashion for six to twelve weeks, depending on the season. Following this curing period, the shark is cut into strips and hung to dry for several months. During this drying period, a brown crust will develop, which is removed prior to cutting the shark into small pieces and serving. The traditional preparation process may be observed at Bjarnarhöfn Shark Museum on Snæfellsnes.

The modern method is simply to press the shark's meat in a large plastic container, into which drain holes have been cut.

== Reactions ==
Chef Anthony Bourdain described fermented shark as "the single worst, most disgusting and terrible tasting thing" he had ever eaten.

Chef Gordon Ramsay challenged James May to sample three "delicacies" (Laotian snake whiskey, bull penis, and fermented shark) on The F Word. After eating the fermented shark, Ramsay immediately vomited into a bucket tableside, but May was able to keep his down and even offered to eat it again.

On an Iceland-themed season-2 episode of Travel Channel's Bizarre Foods with Andrew Zimmern, Andrew Zimmern described the smell as reminding him of "some of the most horrific things I've ever breathed in my life", but said that the dish tasted much better than it smelled. He described the taste as "sweet, nutty and only faintly fishy". Nonetheless, he did note of fermented shark: "That's hardcore. That's serious food. You don't want to mess with that. That's not for beginners".

On a 2015 episode of Travel Man, Jessica Hynes and Richard Ayoade visited a Reykjavík restaurant and described the taste of hákarl as "awful", "like a jellied cube of ammonia", albeit "technically edible".

On a season-5 final episode of Animal Planet's River Monsters, biologist and angler Jeremy Wade mentioned that the flesh "smells of urine" that has "a really strong aftertaste, it really kicks in. It really kicks in at the back of the throat after you take the first bite". He further stated that the meat was unlike anything that he had tried before and that it was similar to a very strong cheese but with a definite fish element.

Archaeologist Neil Oliver tasted hákarl in the BBC documentary Vikings as part of his examination of the Viking diet. He described it as reminiscent of "blue cheese but a hundred times stronger".

In his series Ainsley Eats the Streets, chef Ainsley Harriott was unable to tolerate the heavy ammonia taste and described it as "like chewing a urine-infested mattress".

== Effects ==
The Greenland shark takes 150 years to reach sexual maturity, with some sharks living up to 400 years. Due to this, hunting of the Greenland shark is unsustainable and is slowly leading to the potential extinction of the species. As the Greenland shark is the longest-living vertebrate in the world, it takes an enormous amount of time for native populations to recover, currently being listed as vulnerable by the IUCN, primarily due to the effects of bycatch. Associations, such as the Northwest Atlantic Fisheries Organization, an intergovernmental fishing science and management body, are calling for a ban of the hunting and killing of Greenland shark.

== See also ==
- Fesikh – Traditional Egyptian fermented fish
- Garum – Historical fermented fish sauce
- Gravlax – Nordic dish consisting of raw salmon cured in salt, sugar, and dill
- Hongeo-hoe – Korean fermented fish dish
- Igunaq – Method of preparing meat
- Kiviak – Little auks fermented in a sealskin, a traditional Greenlandic food
- Kusaya – Japanese dried and fermented fish
- Lutefisk – Nordic dried fish dish
- Pla ra – Southeast Asian fermented fish seasoning
- Bagoong – Type of Philippine condiment
- Rakfisk – Norwegian fermented fish dish made from trout or char
- Rock salmon – British shark dish
- Surströmming – Swedish fermented Baltic Sea herring
- Worcestershire sauce – English fermented condiment
