= Chukchi cuisine =

Food of an indigenous people in Siberia

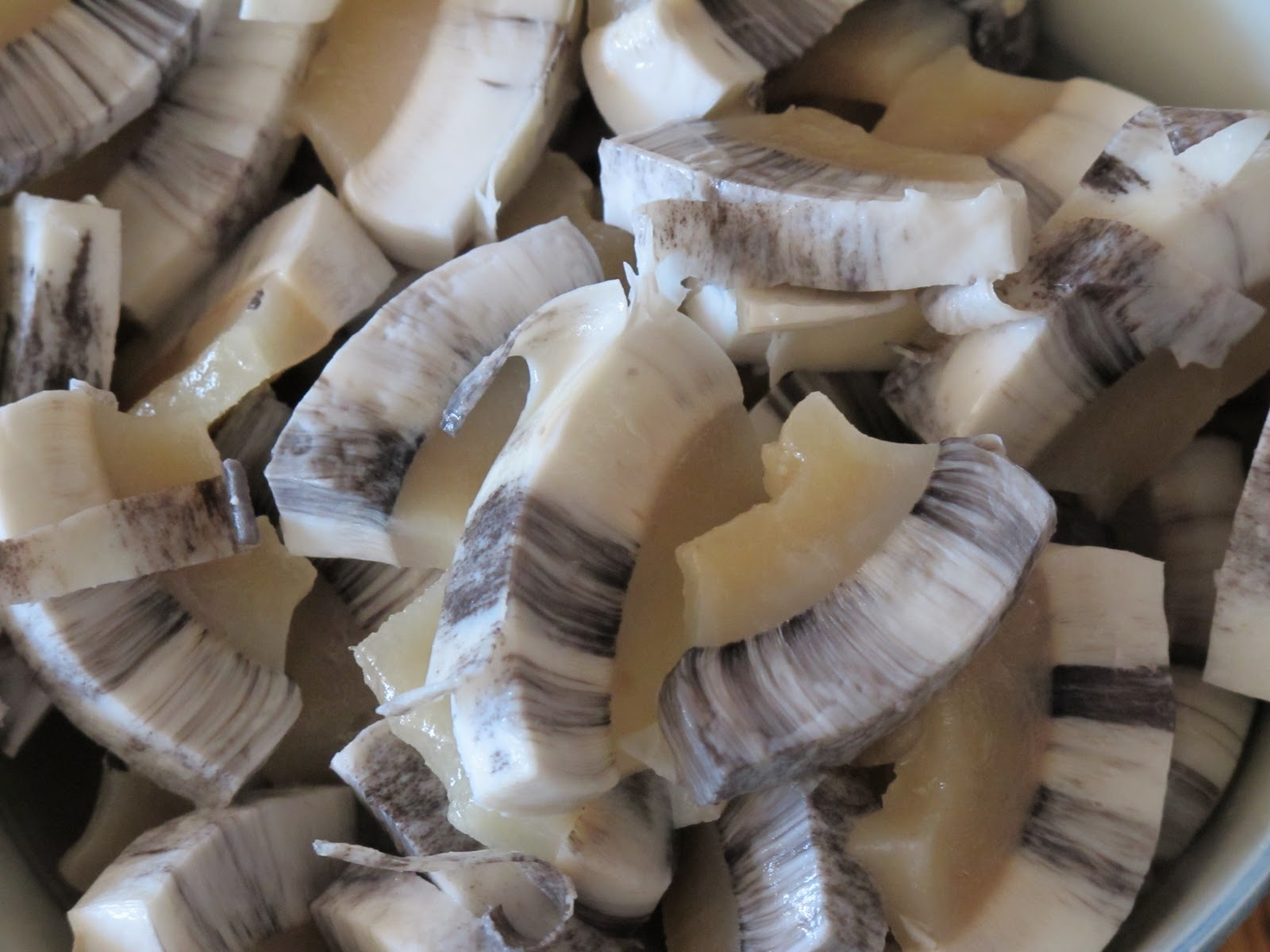
Sliced and prepared ikiilgin (Икииԓгин)

Chukchi cuisine refers to subsistence foods and their methods of preparation used by the Chukchi people, one of the indigenous peoples of Siberia.

== Overview ==
The conquest of Siberia by the Russian Empire in the 16th and 17th centuries, followed by smallpox and other epidemics, and then eventually the Soviet collectivization of the 20th century, led to great changes in the lives and diets of the Chukchi people. They are now mostly settled in towns in the Chukotka Autonomous Okrug and surrounding areas, and regularly consume bread, vodka, and other food derived from agriculture and industrial production. Chukchi cuisine has over the centuries been heavily influenced by Russian cuisine. Preparation techniques include cooking on a hot stone, boiling, fermentation, and raw consumption.

The traditional cuisine is heavily dependent on meat, particularly reindeer meat and whale meat. The Chukchi were split into two groups, each with a different lifestyle. The Reindeer Chukchi, who called themselves the Chauchu ("rich in reindeer"), were a semi-nomadic people who herd reindeer that inhabited the inland tundra. The Maritime Chukchi, on the other hand, who were called Anqallyt or "Ankalyn" ("sea (people)"), were settled whale hunters who inhabited the coastal areas.

== Dishes ==
Some dishes prepared by the Chukchi include:

- Prerem—thinly sliced chunks of boiled reindeer meat mixed with reindeer lard, topped with bone marrow, and frozen.
- Ikiilgyn—frozen, sliced pieces of whale skin and blubber, eaten raw most of the time (a dish known as muktuk in Inuit cuisine).
- Kopalgyn—chunks of walrus or seal meat, including the skin, placed into a pit and consumed after 6 months (also known as igunaq in Inuit cuisine).
- Monjalo—half-digested moss extracted from a large deer's stomach, often eaten in a stew with blood, fat, and finely cut meat.
- Rilkeil—''semi-digested moss from a slaughtered reindeer's stomach mixed with blood, fat, and pieces of boiled reindeer intestine'' and sometimes herbs.
- Vilmulimul—reindeer stomach, filled with reindeer blood, boiled kidneys, liver, ears, fried hooves, and lips, with berries and sorrel, and stored for the winter for consumption.
- Opane—boiled pieces of fatty reindeer meat, with reindeer blood added during boiling.

== See also ==
- Reindeer hunting in Greenland
- Reindeer in Russia
- Reindeer in Siberian shamanism
