= Smokie (food) =

Food made by blowtorching fleece off an unskinned carcass

A West African smokie is a food prepared by blowtorching the fleece off the unskinned carcass of an old sheep or goat.

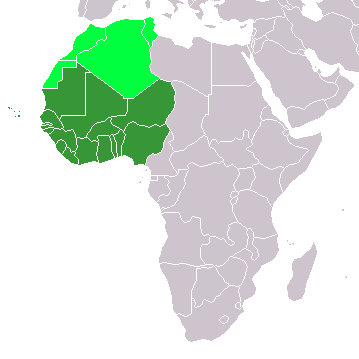
Western Africa (UN subregion) Maghreb, a separate region

== Legal status ==
The sale of the African variety of smokies is illegal in many western countries including the United Kingdom and the European Union. Nevertheless, they are sometimes available on the black market in cities with large expatriate West African Muslim populations. This prohibition is largely due to fear of the possibility of transmission of scrapie and bovine spongiform encephalopathy (BSE, mad cow disease), deadly, degenerative prion diseases that are spread by ingestion of nerve and brain tissue from infected ungulates such as sheep, cows and goats. Furthermore, butchering an ungulate carcass with the skin intact and unsterilized considerably raises the risks for induction of fecal coliform bacteria such as E. coli or Salmonella into the meat and is thus banned in the UK by law. This risk is heightened because the smokies are generally produced in covert (and often grossly unsanitary) butchering facilities and handled without proper sanitary procedures. Furthermore, the goats and sheep used are traditionally old, worn-out or lame animals bought inexpensively from milk and wool farms and are not intended for human consumption.

Since the process of producing a smokie requires that the skin and wool of the carcass be left in place and burned in one piece, the spinal cord is not removed from the carcass prior to consumption. Thus, consumers (however careful) may unwittingly ingest tissues from the central nervous system, potentially exposing themselves to scrapie or BSE prions. For this reason, UK laws strictly forbid the sale of meat from cattle or sheep with the nervous system and skin still attached.

=== Exposé ===
On 29 March 2005, and again on 6 April, the BBC television programme Watchdog publicised the sale of smokies in London, two years after the Chartered Institute of Environmental Health (CIEH) told a conference about their production in Wales.

On 17 September 2012, BBC London TV news broadcast a report by Guy Lynn. They secretly recorded the illegal sale of smokies in the Ridley Road market in Dalston, Hackney. The report was reacted to with widespread condemnation and shock that little was being done to prevent the illicit trade.

== Legalization movement ==
Arising from the illegal production of smokies in the UK, the UK Food Safety Agency commissioned studies into a method for the hygienic production of smokies. When asked, the European Food Standards Agency stated evidence was "insufficient to support the conclusion that the burnt fleece skin-on sheep carcasses produced by the method described were suitable for human consumption."

The Farmers' Union of Wales has called for smokies to be legalised in the United Kingdom, stating that there has not been any medical proof that the meat could be harmful.

== See also ==
- Smoking (cooking)
- Smalahove
- West African cuisine
