= Powsowdie =

Scottish sheep's-head broth or soup

Powsowdie is a Scottish sheep's-head broth or soup. Traditional preparation of the soup includes sheep's trotters as an ingredient. Dried peas and barley can also be used as additional ingredients. Powsowdie has been described as a speciality dish in Edinburgh, Scotland. Powsowdie is less popular and less known in contemporary times; it was more prominent during times when "all parts of an animal were used in cooking and nothing was wasted". The National Library of Scotland included powsowdie in a 2015 food history exhibition named "Lifting the lid", which was an exhibit of historic Scottish recipe books that included example dishes.

"Powsowdie" has also been used as a term for "milk and meal boiled together" and as "any mixture of incongruous sorts of foods."

== See also ==
- List of soups
- List of lamb dishes
- Scottish cuisine
- Smalahove
- Svið
