= Explorer Vodka =

Swedish brand of vodka

Explorer Vodka today. The image isn't the original one.

Explorer Vodka is a Swedish Wheat vodka brand manufactured by the V&S Group, formerly owned by the Swedish government. It was developed in the 1950s, targeted for customers in the United States, but its 1958 launch failed in the market. It was instead released in Sweden from 1961. Ever since "Explorer" has been one of Sweden's most popular brands of vodka, and has during some periods been the most sold distilled beverages in Sweden. It was the first Swedish alcoholic beverage to be termed vodka rather than brännvin.

The original bottle was designed by Swedish ex-prince Sigvard Bernadotte. The label, with exception of the red and white colours of the sail, represents a realistic Viking ship on a voyage of discovery. Or in other terms an exploring ship.

== See also ==
- Absolut Vodka
