= Þorri =

Icelandic winter month

Þorri (Icelandic pronunciation: [ˈθɔrːɪ]) is the Icelandic name of the personification of frost or winter in Norse mythology, and also the name of the fourth winter month (mid January to mid February) in the Icelandic calendar.

== Attestations ==
In the Orkneyinga saga (written in the 13th century), Þorri (often written Thorri in English) is a legendary Nordic king, the son of Snær ('Snow') the Old, a descendant of Fornjót. Þorri was father of two sons named Nór (eponymous founder of Norway) and Gór, and a daughter named Gói ('thin snow, track-snow').

The saga Hversu Noregr byggðist ("How Norway was settled", written in the 12th century) states that Þorri was an ancient king of Finland (which until the 17th century CE referred only to Finland Proper, the southwesternmost part of Finland), Kænlandi (which according to the sources was located just north of Finland Proper, i.e. in Satakunta) and Gotland, and that the "Kænir" offered a yearly sacrifice to Þorri, at mid-winter. The Hversu Noregr byggðist also says that Þorri has three sisters: Drífa (mother of Visbur according to Ynglingatal), Fönn, and Mjöll. Hversu Noregr byggðist further describes Þorri's children (Nór, Gór, and Gói, as in Orkneyinga saga), and follows Nór's descendants as they settle Norway.

== Name and connection to Thor and Thorablot ==
Both the month name and the name of the midwinter sacrifice, Þorrablót, are derived from the personal name Þorri. Orkneyinga saga states that the Þorrablót was established by Þorri.

The name Þorri has long been identified with that of Thor, the name of the Norse thunder god, or thunder personified. Probably the Þorrablót was in origin a sacrifice dedicated to Þór himself, and the figure of Þorri is a secondary etymology derived from the name of the sacrifice. Nilsson thinks that the personification of Þorri "frost" and Goi "track-snow" was particular to Iceland.

The pagan sacrifice of Þorrablót disappeared with the Christianisation of Iceland, but in the 19th century, a midwinter festival called Þorrablót was introduced in Romantic nationalism, and is still popular in contemporary Iceland, since the 1960s associated with a selection of traditional food, called Þorramatur. Regardless of actual etymology, it is a popular explanation of the name Þorri to take it as a diminutive of Þór and it remains common practice to toast Þór as part of the modern celebration.

== See also ==
- Ded Moroz
- Blot (sacrifice)
- Midwinter
- Midvinterblot
