= Smalahove =

Traditional Norwegian dish made from a sheep's head

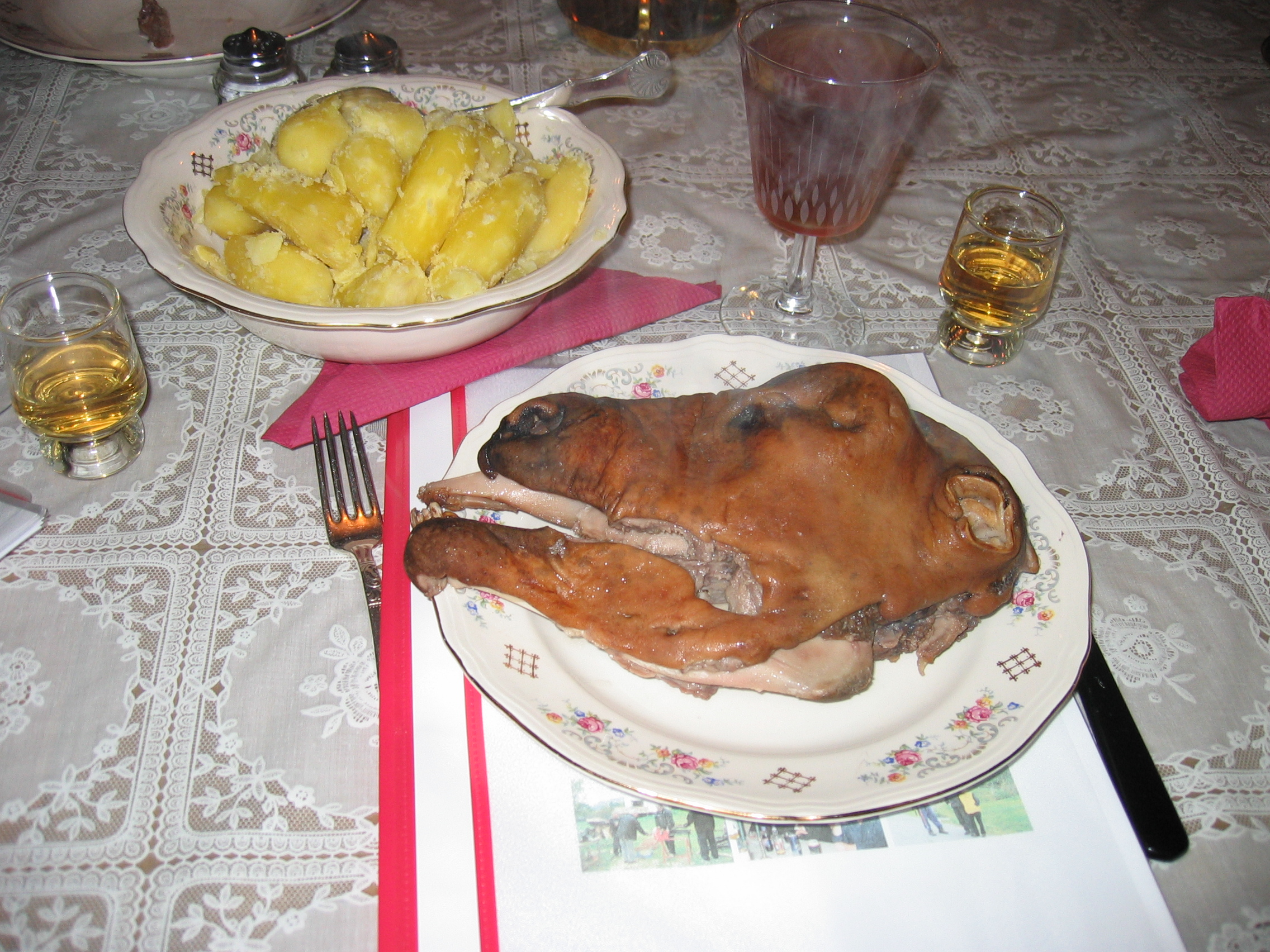
- A serving of smalahove at Voss, Norway
- Alternative names: Smalehovud, Skjelte
- Course: Main course
- Place of origin: Norway
- Serving temperature: Hot
- Main ingredients: Lamb head

Smalahove (also called smalehovud, sau(d)ehau(d) or skjelte) is a Western Norwegian traditional dish made from a sheep's head, originally eaten before Christmas. The name of the dish comes from the combination of the Norwegian words hove and smale. Hove is a dialectal form of hovud, meaning "head" (cf. Hǫfuð), and smale is a word for sheep, so smalahove literally means "sheep head". The skin and fleece of the head are torched, the brain removed, and the head is salted, sometimes smoked, and dried. The head is boiled or steamed for about three hours, and served with mashed swede/rutabaga and potatoes. It is also traditionally served with akevitt. In some preparations, the brain is cooked inside the skull and then eaten with a spoon or fried. Originally, smalahove was typically eaten by the poor.

== Traditional consumption ==
One serving usually consists of one half of a head. The ear and eye are normally eaten first, as they are the fattiest areas and are best eaten warm. The head is often eaten from the front to the back, working around the bones of the skull.

== Legality ==
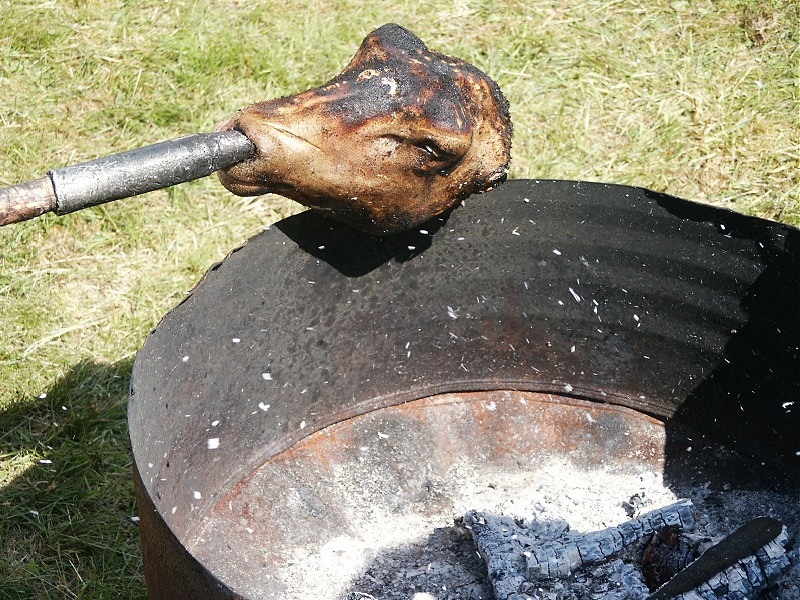
Burning the wool off a head

Since 1998 and the mad cow epidemics, an EU directive forbids the production of smalahove from adult sheep, due to fear of the possibility of transmission of scrapie, a deadly, degenerative prion disease of sheep and goats, though scrapie does not appear to be transmissible to humans. It is now allowed to be produced only from the heads of lambs.

== Tourism ==
Smalahove is sometimes considered to be unappealing or even repulsive. It is enjoyed mostly by enthusiasts, and is often served to tourists. Because of its status as an "extreme" food, tourists often seek it out as a thrill. Voss Municipality in Norway, in particular, has benefited from tourists wishing to try it, "not only as a nostalgic and authentic rural dish, but also as a challenging culinary trophy appealing to thrill-seeking consumers."

== See also ==
- Svið
- Kale Pache
- List of lamb dishes
- List of smoked foods
- Powsowdie
- Smokie (food)
