= Reindeer in Siberian shamanism =

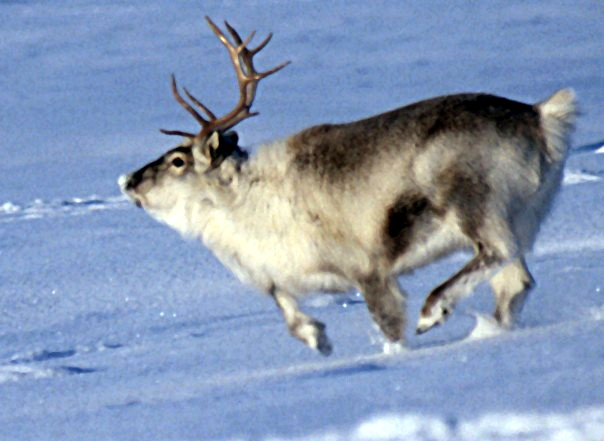
Reindeer in Svalbard, Norway

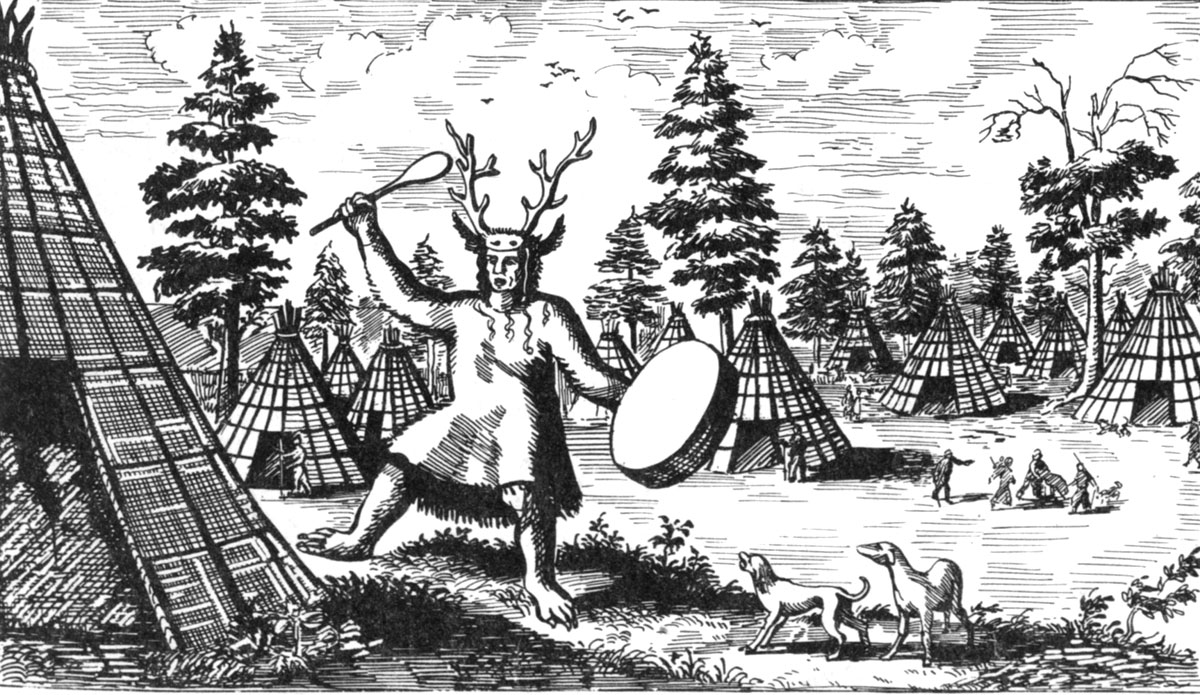
Tungus shaman wearing antlers, 17th century drawing.

Reindeer in Siberian shamanism reflect the cultural, as well as the economic, relationship between the native peoples of Siberia, a region of Northern Asia, and the reindeer that live there. It involves the nomadic reindeer herders, those that hunt wild reindeer and those who maintain domesticated ones. Their religious beliefs reflect the spiritual philosophy of shamanism, and their traditions often involve reindeer in several steps of the process of practicing their religion.

== Shamanism ==
Russian anthropologist S. M. Shirokogoroff wrote that by being transformed into a reindeer, the shaman feels himself to be "swift, vigilant, watchful, the best animal the Tungus know." Reindeer antlers, in particular, serve simultaneously as weapons and representations of power. Also, the definition of shamanism varies widely. Soviet scholars perceived them as a version of the priesthood, but Willerslev posits that shamanism is a "broad-based activity practiced to varying degrees by common hunters rather than as a form of 'mysticism' under the control of a religious elite."

== Equipment ==
=== Baton ===
A shaman's baton is an important object for religious celebrations, where it represents the shaman's spirit helper and serves as the tool for striking his drum, which is perceived as "driving the reindeer." The Evenks utilise the baton to predict the future regarding the growth and welfare of their reindeer herds by throwing the baton towards the inquiring person and determining the answer based on how it falls.

=== Drum ===
The drum is the most important shamanic utensil because the sounds a shaman makes with it permit him to summon spirits to aid him in his work. A shaman's drum consists of a circular wooden hoop over which reindeer hide has been stretched. The drum is closely associated with reindeer, the riding of which facilitated the shaman's ability to go on journeys, and was the source of the shaman's strength. A shaman's drum was initiated and brought to life in an initiation ceremony that concluded with a feast of reindeer meat that had been slaughtered the day before.

The ceremony in which the drum is brought to life spans several days. On the second day, the ceremony is devoted to retracing the steps of the life of the reindeer whose skin was used to make the drum. The shaman collects everything dropped by the deer, including all hairs, and brings everything to the swamp, where Ylyunda kotta, the mistress of the universe, lives. With the help of eight wolves, the shaman catches the soul of the reindeer for his drum.

=== Clothing ===
A shaman's outfit was prepared so that the power of the reindeer whose skins constructed the robe would be transferred to the one who wore it. The headdress often consists of a metal cap with reindeer antlers, and reindeer antlers also figured heavily in the designs of objects hung on the cloak. Attached to the cloak were strips of reindeer hair or reindeer skin, referring to the body of the reindeer and to the fact that shamans regain the ability to fly that, according to the belief of the Ket people, reindeer had once possessed. Shamans also have wooden stakes that represent the reindeer on which they ride to other worlds. The best of the Enets shamans have iron reindeer staves with a face at the tip of its handle and a lower end shaped like a hoof. These staves are used for treating the sick and sending the souls of the dead to the next world.

== Medical treatment ==
A shaman's main strategy in treating the sick was to intercede between the sick person, and the spirits and deities whose behaviour was associated with disease, by banishing the evil spirit from the patient and returning the soul stolen by the spirits. Shamans invite spirits inside themselves by swallowing and yawning and treat them to reindeer blood and fat before using their influence to cast his baton to discover the most effective source of treatment. They also called upon helper spirits, which were often reindeer, to transfer the disease from a human body into the helper spirit. A sick person can also be cured by placing the injured part of his body inside the "belly" of a reindeer; when the injured area is too large for this management of the problem, the reindeer's entrails are pulled out to form a loop through which the ill person can step.

== Ceremonies and sacrifices ==
Although different Siberian peoples follow different traditions, many ceremonial practices involving reindeer possess similar underlying features. These often relate to the well-being of the herd and the monetary benefits gained as a result, reflect the people's nomadic heritage, and express humanity's relationship to the cyclic progression of the seasons. In general, sacrifices take place in "sacred places", which are usually sanctified thickets in the woods that are home to gods or spirits and where hallowed trees stand. Reindeer skins, hoof, and antlers hang in the trees, because it is believed necessary for the deity to receive the entirety of the animal being sacrificed. Although different peoples perform reindeer sacrifice in different ways, all of these rites involve the offering of the animal to a spirit or deity in some way.

=== Khanty ===
To the Khanty people, reindeer sacrifice is part of a series of overarching practices around ritual killings, offered to "make life for a man easier", in order to prolong life and help men to recover from sickness, according to the son of a shaman. Khanty differentiate between "bloody" sacrifices, or yir, in which the blood of the sacrificed animals is preserved and consumed, in addition to portions of the raw meat, and "bloodless" sacrifices, or pori, in which the meat of the sacrificed animal is boiled and eaten. Khanty have sacrificed other animals besides reindeer, including horses, cows, bulls, rams, and roosters, but reindeer are infinitely preferable because the sacrifice of a useful animal is considered to be more significant.

The choice of location for the sacrifice is revealed in a dream to the chirta-ko, or Khanty cultural specialist. The chirta-ko prepared by leading the tribe in singing spirit songs accompanied by his drum. During a specific song, he consumes mushrooms and is enlightened by their influence as to the logistical details of the sacrifice.

The reindeer to be sacrificed have coloured cloths tied to their necks, and the different colours hold special meanings: white is associated with the sky, black is associated with the underworld, and red is associated with earthly mortality. The gender of the reindeer should be the same as that of the spirit to whom it is being offered. The reindeer's colouring is an important factor in determining the specific individuals to be sacrificed. The number of animals offered in communal sacrifice is usually either three or seven.

After a ritual with chanting prayers, the reindeer are killed and skinned without spilling any blood on the snow. The people clean the butchered carcasses and consume raw muscle meat with salt and cooked stomach, heart, and liver. The ceremony ends by chanting prayers of thanksgiving. They then hang the reindeer skins and bones in trees for the purpose of returning the animal's spirit to the "Keeper of Game or Master of Animals" for the purpose of being "reclothed with new flesh and sent back to the earth-surface world for the benefit of the people".

=== Koryaks ===
Among the Koryaks, men bring the reindeer herds away from the summer camp during the summer, but the women, children and old people remain. At the first notice that the herds are returning, the people run out to meet them with burning fire.

=== Chukchi ===
The Chukchi hold a similar celebration, where they greet the returning herd with a boisterous welcome, before slaughtering a series of both fawns and bucks, skinning their carcasses, and extracting marrow from the reindeer's bones as sustenance. They then use reindeer blood in a painting ritual. The "fawn festival" is an annual Chukchi event which takes place every spring, during which a reindeer is sacrificed to the "One-On-High." The Chukchi also hold a "ceremonial of antlers" in which they collect all of the antlers of all of the animals in their herds, and when the collection becomes too cumbersome to move, they place them all in a large pile and hold a sacrifice.

== Burial traditions ==
In general, sacrifices take place in "sacred places", which are usually sanctified thickets in the woods that are home to gods or spirits and where hallowed trees stand. Reindeer skins, hooves and antlers hang in the trees, because it is believed necessary for the deity to receive the entirety of the animal being sacrificed. Although different peoples perform reindeer sacrifice in different ways, all of these rites involve the offering of the animal to a spirit or deity in some way. Many cultures have some version of the idea that the souls of the dead need a vehicle to transport them to the next world, so it is logical that the peoples of Siberia, where reindeer are the most common large draught and riding animals, believe that reindeer perform this service.

=== Ob-Ugrians ===
Those Ob-Ugrians who practice reindeer herding also use reindeer to transport their dead for burial, but they then strangle the animals at the gravesite before slaughtering them. They then wrap the bones in the skin and leave the bundle to the left of the grave, also positioning the head (with attached antlers) on the roof of the grave-house.

=== Evenks ===
The Evenks believed in spirits that inhabited the underground, so they buried their dead above ground by sewing the bodies into reindeer skins and placing the wrapped cadavers on high poles.

=== Chukchi ===
Among the Chukchi, the burial ceremony provides the dead person with the means to travel to the underworld and to send them on their way, if not to carry them the whole distance. First, the shaman divines where the person wished to be buried. Friends of the deceased carry the body out of the tent through its smoke hole or out the back and tie it to a new or freshly repaired sledge to which reindeer have been harnessed. When the funeral cortège arrives at the burial site, the reindeer are untied and stabbed, then rehitched to the sled. The leader of the funeral procession then takes the reins and cracks the whip, pretending to drive the reindeer to the country of the dead, and he only ceases when the reindeer are dead. Then the reindeer are butchered and the carcasses are left on the burial site with the sledge, and harness. The deceased's family places the skins from the slaughtered reindeer on the floor of their tent and places iron objects on top of them, preventing the dead from reemerging through the ground. The Chukchi also hold a "ceremonial of antlers" in which they collect all of the antlers of all of the animals in their herds, and when the collection becomes too cumbersome to move, they place them all in a large pile and hold a sacrifice.
