= Midwinter =

Period of the year

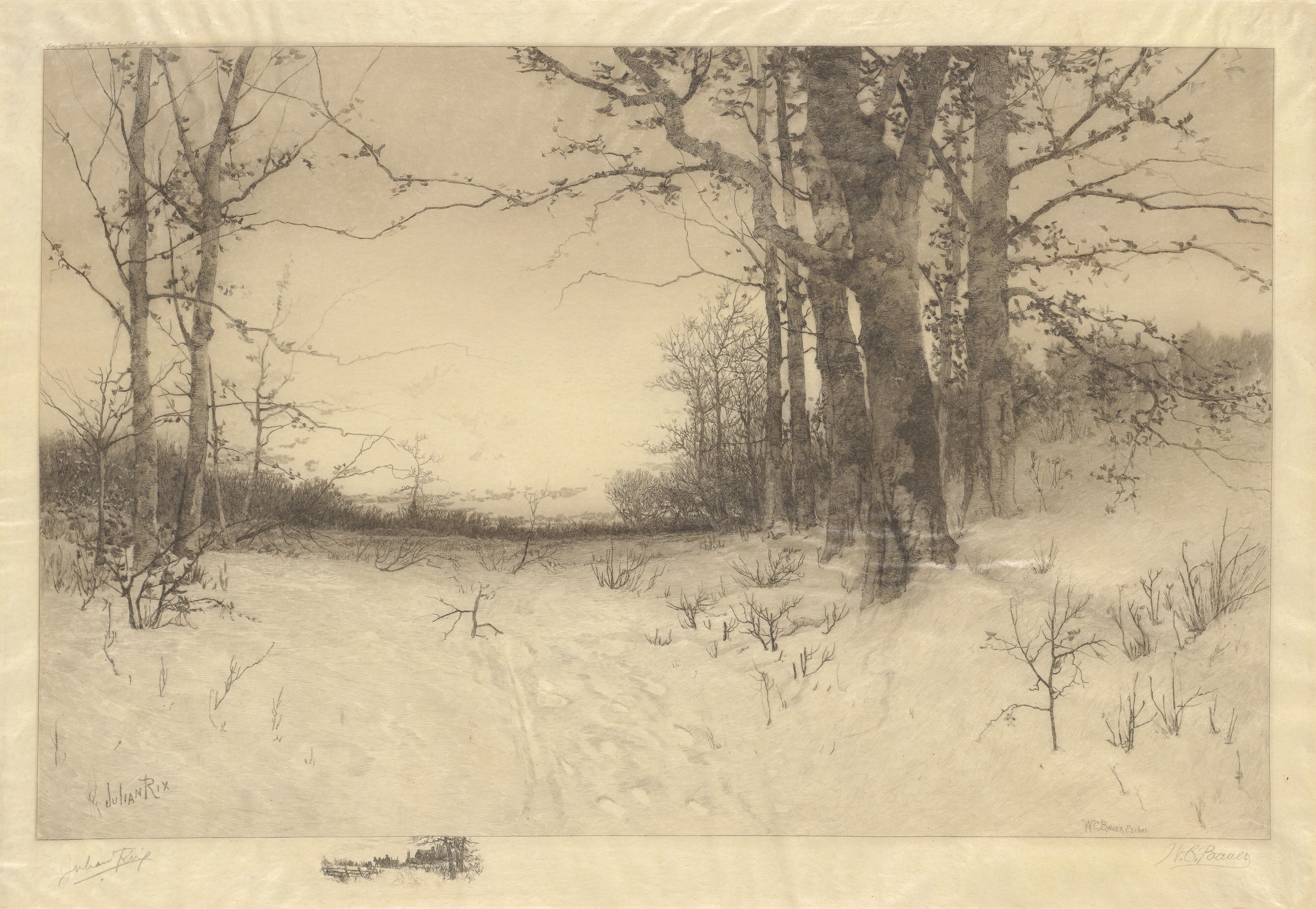
Etching, Midwinter, W.C. Bauer

Midwinter is the middle of the winter. The term is attested in the early Germanic calendars where it was a period or a day which may have been determined by a lunisolar calendar before it was adapted into the Gregorian calendar. It appears with several meanings in later sources. In Old English, midwinter could mean Christmas Day (25 December) or sometimes the Christmas season; indirectly it could also mean the winter solstice, which was regarded as 25 December. In Old Norse, miðvetr (midwinter) meant either the first day or entire period of the Scandinavian month Þorri (mid-January to mid-February). Since the 18th century, it has sometimes been misunderstood as synonymous with the astronomical winter solstice (21/22 December), which the word also can refer to in contemporary English.

== Attestations ==
Midwinter is attested in the early Germanic calendars, where it appears to have been a specific day or a number of days during the winter half of the year. Before Christianisation and the adoption of the Julian calendar, the date of midwinter may have varied due to the use of a lunisolar calendar, or it may have been based on a week system tied to the astronomical winter solstice.

In Old English, midwinter could mean the entire Christmas season or specifically Christmas Day (25 December), which was also called middes wintres mæssedæg (midwinter's mass-day). Old English midwinter could indirectly also mean the winter solstice, which was regarded as 25 December in Anglo-Saxon England, following the Julian calendar and the localisation of Jesus' birth to this date.

In Scandinavia, winter is deemed to last longer than more southerly parts of Europe. In medieval Scandinavian sources that divided the year into two seasons, winter was deemed to begin with the "Winter Nights" in mid-October and to end in mid-April. In the medieval Icelandic calendar, midwinter day was the first day of Þorri, the fourth winter month, which corresponds to the middle of January in the Gregorian calendar. The entire month of Þorri was sometimes referred to as midwinter (Old Norse: miðvetr). According to Snorri Sturluson's Heimskringla (c. 1230), the pre-Christian holiday Yule was originally celebrated at midwinter, but in the 10th century, the king Haakon the Good moved it to the same day as Christmas, about three weeks earlier.

If Candlemas day be dry and fair,
The half o' winter's to come and mair;
If Candlemas day be wet and foul,
The half o' winter gane at Yule.

— Scottish variation of a proverb about
when the middle of winter occurs

In popular language since the medieval period, midwinter in Scandinavia can refer to the period from the middle of January to the middle of February, which usually is the coldest part of the year in northern Europe, sometimes with Candlemas as winter's midpoint. In British verses and proverbs attested since the early modern period, fair weather on Candlemas indicates that at least half of winter remains, whereas foul weather means that winter is over. In the Sámi week system, 5–11 February is known as the midwinter week.

English poet Christina Rossetti’s 1872 work “In the Bleak Midwinter”, originally titled “A Christmas Carol”, describes Christmas occurring in mid-winter.

== Association with the winter solstice ==
Beginning in the 18th century, the Scandinavian midwinter and Icelandic term hǫkunótt have sometimes been misunderstood by scholars as synonymous with the astronomical winter solstice. Olof von Dahlin wrote in 1747 that the hǫkunótt had been at the winter solstice. The word hǫkunótt is only attested from Snorri who located it to Scandinavian midwinter—the first day of Þorri. The association between Yule and the winter solstice is related to the idea that the pre-Christian Yule was a celebration of the sun, a theory that first emerged in the 17th century.

The Cambridge Dictionary says that "midwinter" can mean the winter solstice in modern English.

== See also ==
- First day of summer (Iceland)
- Midsummer
- Midwinter Day
