= Igunaq =

Method of preparing meat

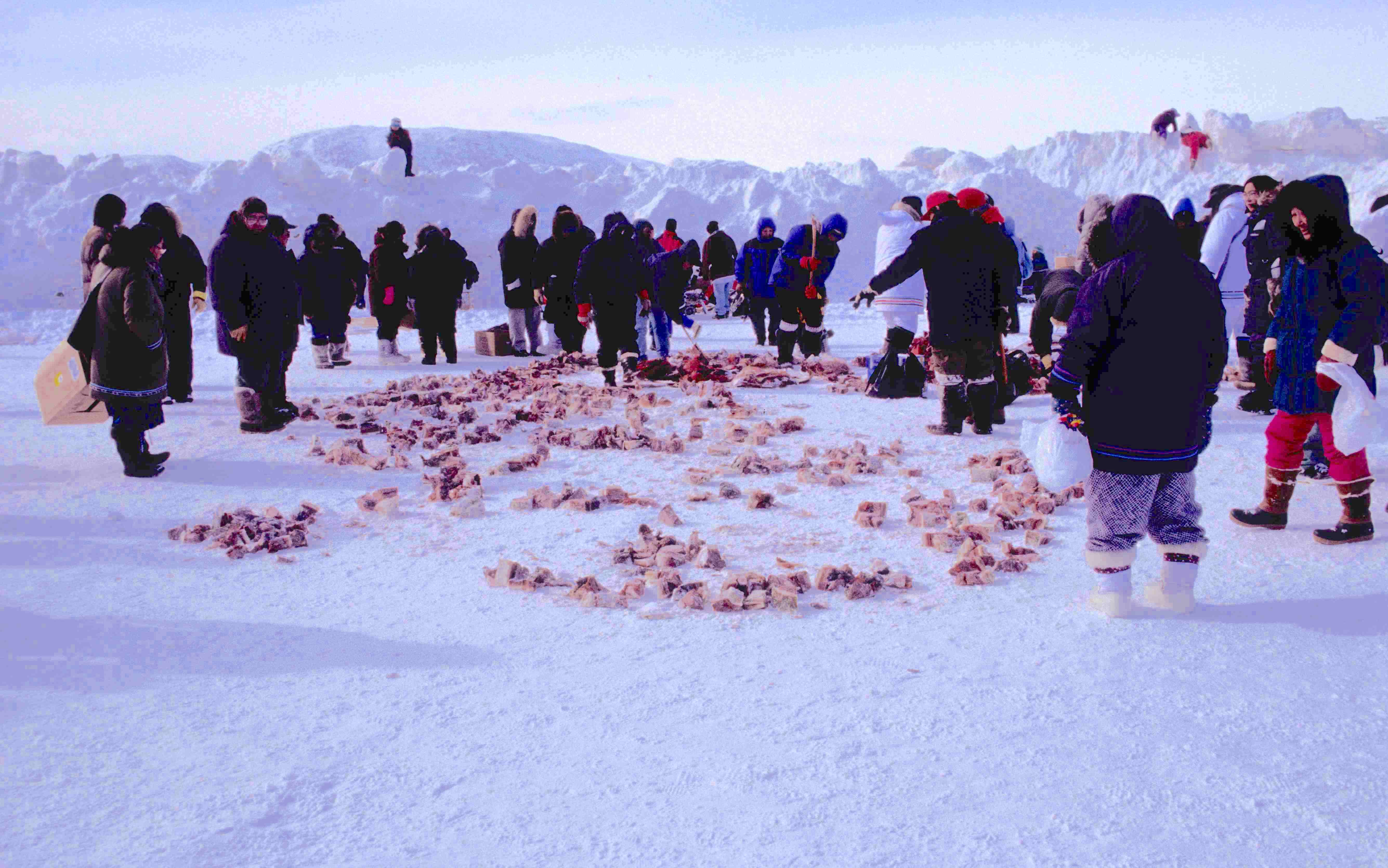
Sharing of Igunaq among Inuit families.

Igunaq (Inuktitut: ᐃᒍᓇᖅ [iɣuˈnaq]), also Kopalhen (Chukot: копалгын, romanized: kopalgyn, IPA [kopaɬɣən]) is an Early Paleo-Eskimo, autolysis-based method of preparing and preserving meat, particularly walrus and other marine mammals, caribou and birds, as part of the Inuit cuisine, Chukchi cuisine, Yamal cuisine, and the Evenki diets.

Meat and fat caught in the summer is buried in the ground (usually at or near the shoreline) as steaks or entire, raw non-dressed animal carcasses, which then ferment over autumn and freeze over winter, ready for consumption the next year. If a herd animal (such as a caribou) is used for the process, it is not fed for a few days to a week before being butchered and buried in order to have its digestive tract clear of any food. Slaughtering is done via strangulation by a rope in order to prevent infecting the wounds with harmful bacteria and insects.

Igunaq is considered a delicacy and is quite valuable. Consumption has declined over the years as a wider range of foodstuffs has become available in the Arctic regions. It is also not without risk – improper production can lead to illness and death through botulism.

Fermented fish and other fermented foods are part of many traditional cuisines worldwide.
