= Sawdust brandy =

Sawdust brandy (from the German Holzbranntwein) is a neutral spirit produced through the distillation of wood products.

To produce sawdust brandy, the wood is cooked with a diluted sulfuric acid, which causes the cellulose to be broken down via acid hydrolysis into dextrose and other simple sugars, while the lignin remains. The acidic, sugar-containing liquid is neutralised and allowed to ferment, producing the ethanol that will later be purified through distillation.

In the German Democratic Republic, the lye produced from the wood pulp was employed in the production of the Holzschnaps ("wood schnapps"). Brandy for human consumption (spirits diluted to drinking strength) produced in this method has no additional risks compared to brandy produced from grain; it actually contains fewer fusel oils than traditional distilling methods involving spirits from grain or fruit. In spite of this, German law governing spirit production (overseen by the "Bundesmonopolverwaltung für Branntwein) forbids the use of sawdust brandy in the production of alcoholic beverages. This ban stems from the purpose of the law as an agricultural subsidy, rather than out of public health concerns.

Prior to modern, synthetic production methods, wood was also once commonly destructively distilled or dry distilled for the production of methanol (wood alcohol).

== See also ==
- Cellulosic ethanol
