= Þorrablót =

Icelandic midwinter festival

Þorrablót (Icelandic pronunciation: [ˈθɔrːaˌplouːt]; transliterated as Thorrablot) is an Icelandic midwinter festival, named for the month of Þorri of the historical Icelandic calendar (corresponding to mid January to mid February), and blót, literally meaning sacrifice.

The historical context is from the Orkneyinga saga, where Þorri ("Frost") is an early Finnish king, the son of Snær ("Snow"). Hversu Noregr byggðist in the Flateyjarbók states that the Kvens offered a yearly sacrifice to Þorri at mid-winter.

The modern festival arose in the second half of the 19th century, with the Romantic nationalism of the time, comparable to Burns night in Scotland. The first known celebration was reportedly organised by the association of Icelandic students in Copenhagen in 1873, and by other societies active in the Icelandic independence movement of the time (Iceland received a constitution in 1874, and was recognized as a kingdom in personal union with Denmark in 1918).

The Þorrablót is an evening with dinner where participants hold speeches and recite poems, originally to honour the Norse god Thor (Þórr), whose name is taken to be associated with Þorri. Calling the feast a blót (a sacramental feast held in honor of a god in Norse mythology) makes clear the reference to pre-Christian times, which many nationalists of the 19th century considered a golden age of Icelandic history.

Today Þorrablót are common events among Icelanders everywhere and can be anything from an informal dinner with friends and family to large organised events with stage performances and an after-dinner dance. These large Þorrablót celebrations are usually arranged by membership associations, associations of Icelanders living abroad, and as regional festivals in the countryside.

== Other sources ==
- Magocsi (ed.), Encyclopedia of Canada's Peoples (Multicultural History Society of Ontario, University of Toronto Press) 1999 p. 695.
- Árni Björnsson, Þorrablót á Íslandi (Reykjavík : Bókaklúbbur Arnar og Örlygs) 1986.
