= Ponton (car) =

1930s–1960s car design genre

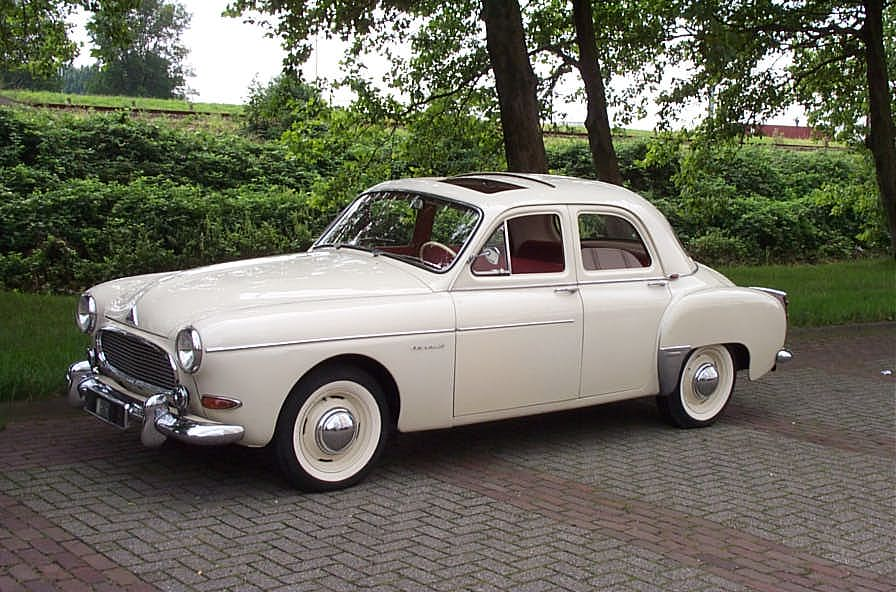
1959 Renault Frégate, a typical postwar design with ponton styling

Ponton or pontoon styling is an automotive design genre that spanned roughly from the 1930s-1960s, when pontoon-like bodywork enclosed the full width and uninterrupted length of a car body — eliminating previously distinct running boards and articulated fenders. The integrated fenders of an automobile with ponton styling may also be called pontoon fenders, and the overall trend may also be known as envelope styling.

Now largely archaic, the term ponton describes the markedly bulbous, slab-sided configuration of postwar European cars, including those of Mercedes-Benz, Opel, Auto Union, DKW, Borgward, Lancia, Fiat, Rover, Renault, and Volvo—as well as similar designs from North America and Japan, sometimes — in its most exaggerated usage — called the "bathtub" look in the U.S.

The term derives from the French and German word ponton, meaning 'pontoon'. The Langenscheidt German–English dictionary defines Pontonkarrosserie as "all-enveloping bodywork, straight-through side styling, slab-sided styling."

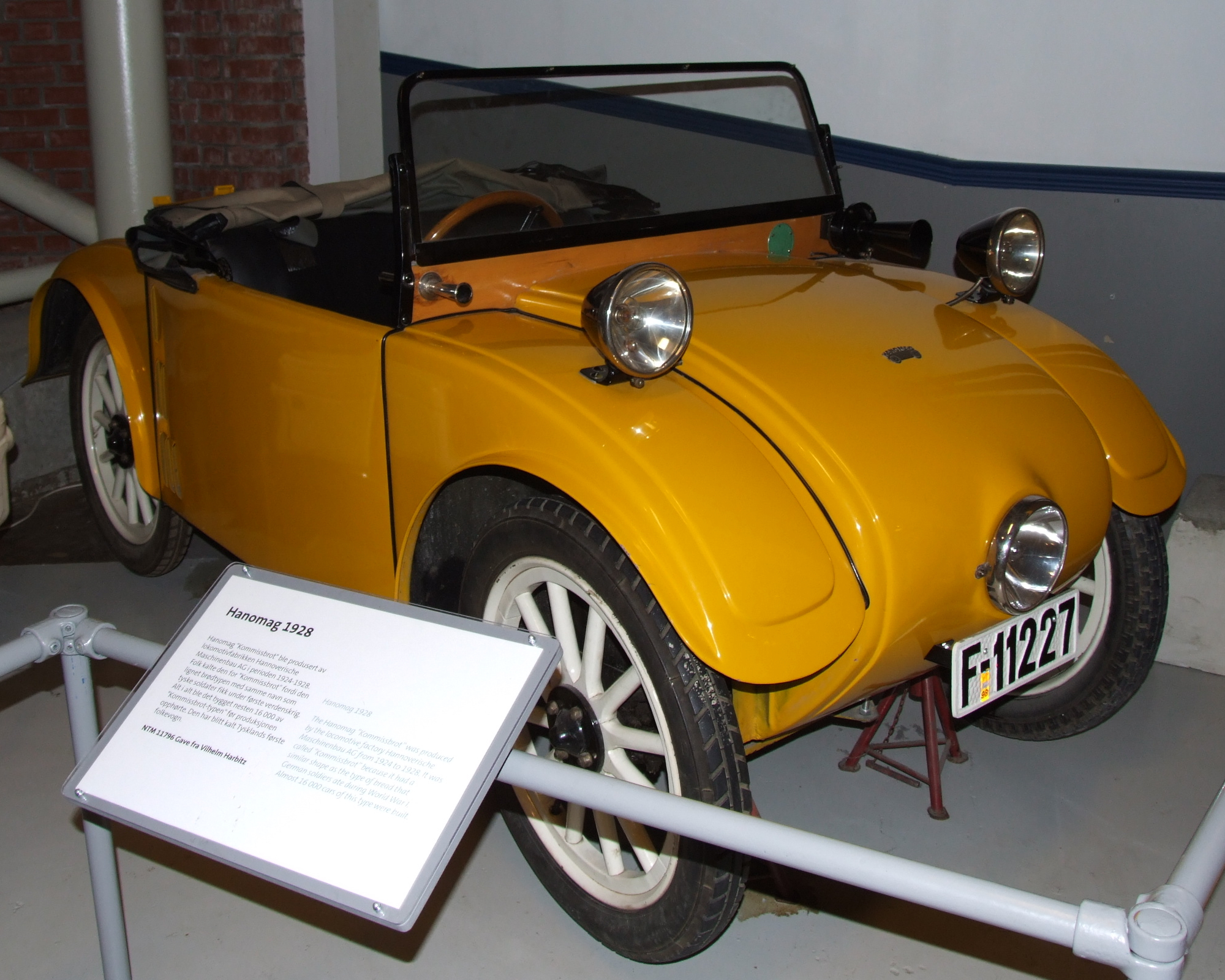
1928 Hanomag Kommissbrot

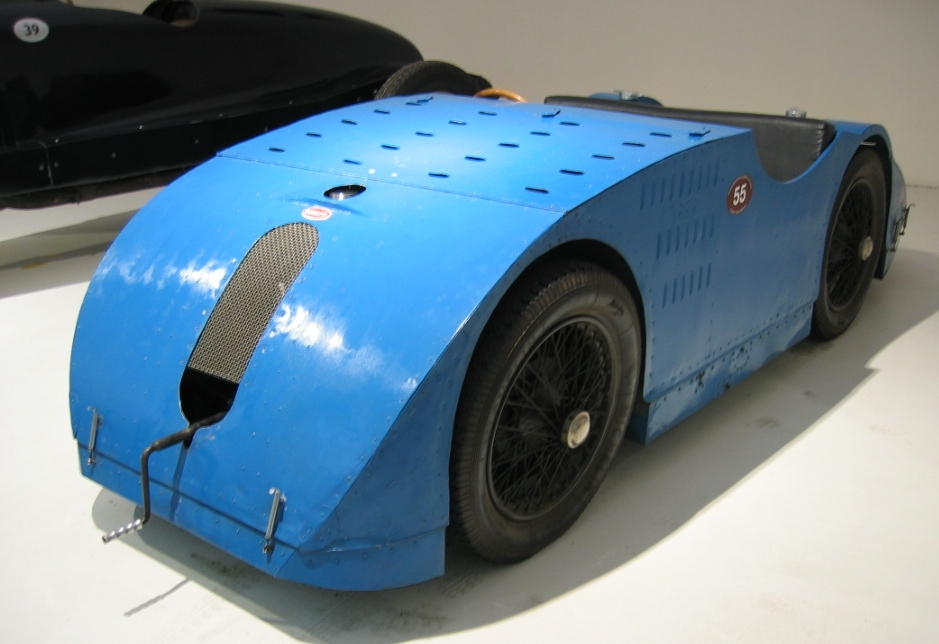
1923 Bugatti Type 32 'Tank'

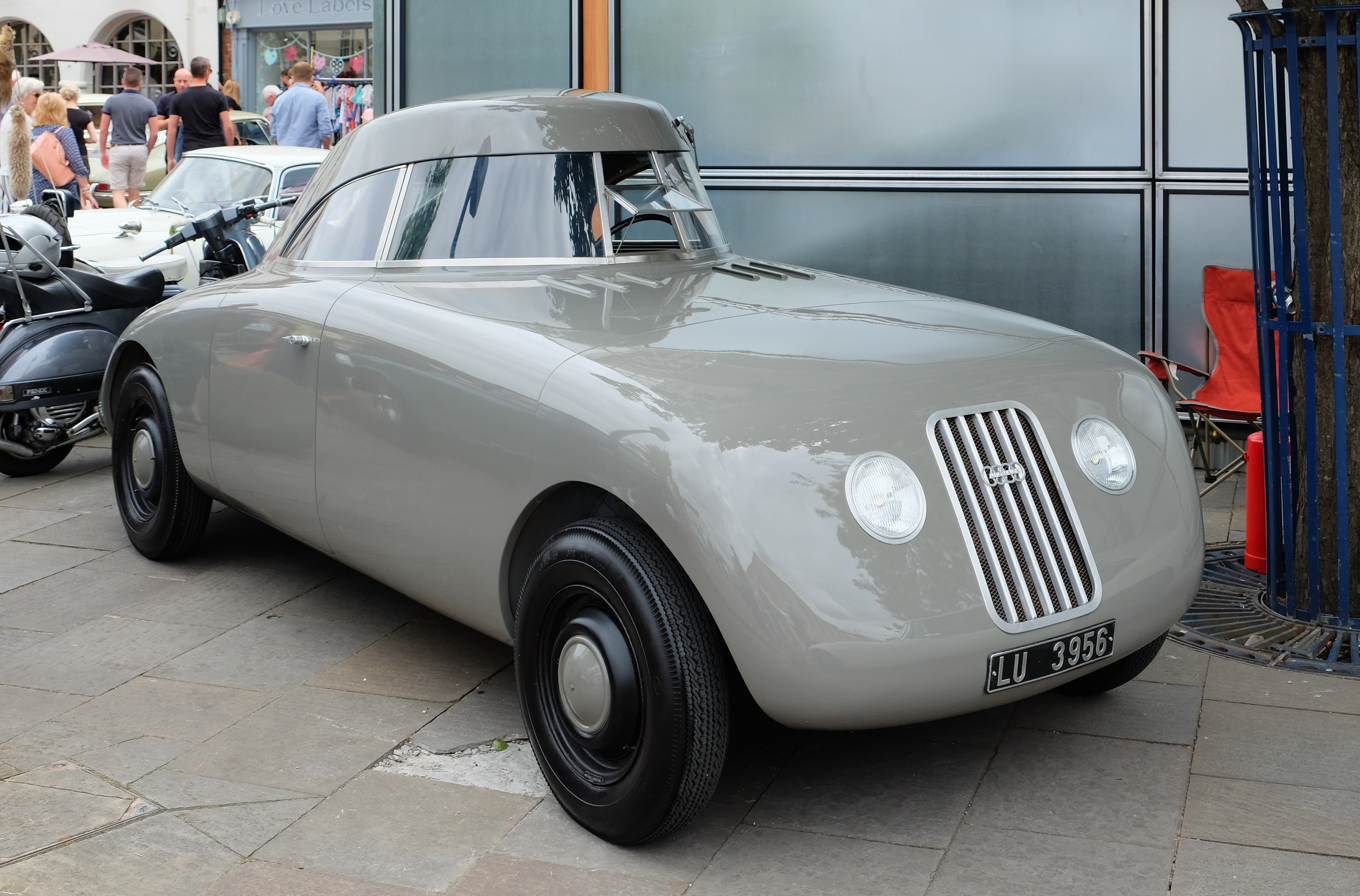
1934 Auto Union streamliner replica

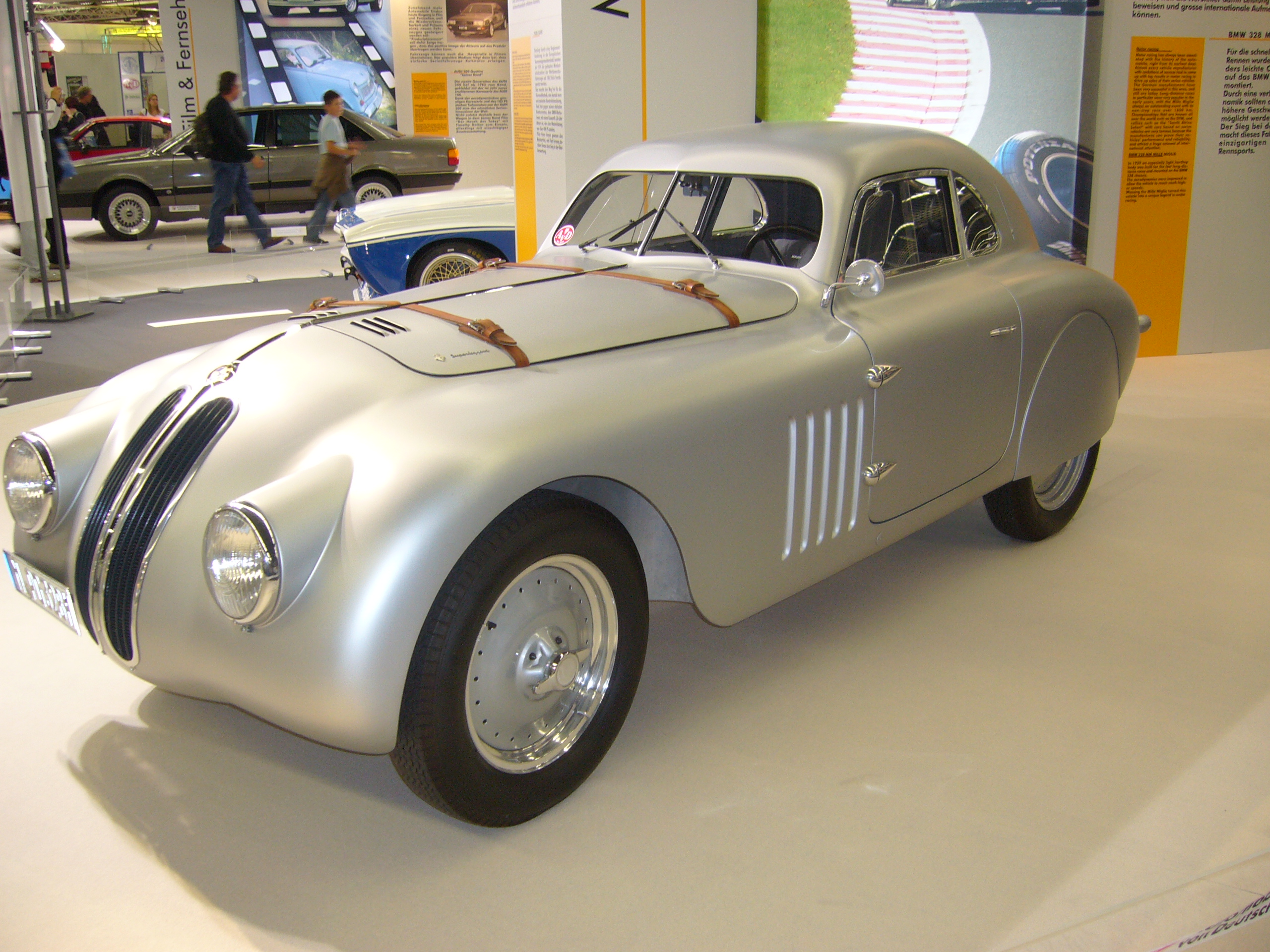
1939 BMW 328 Touring Coupe

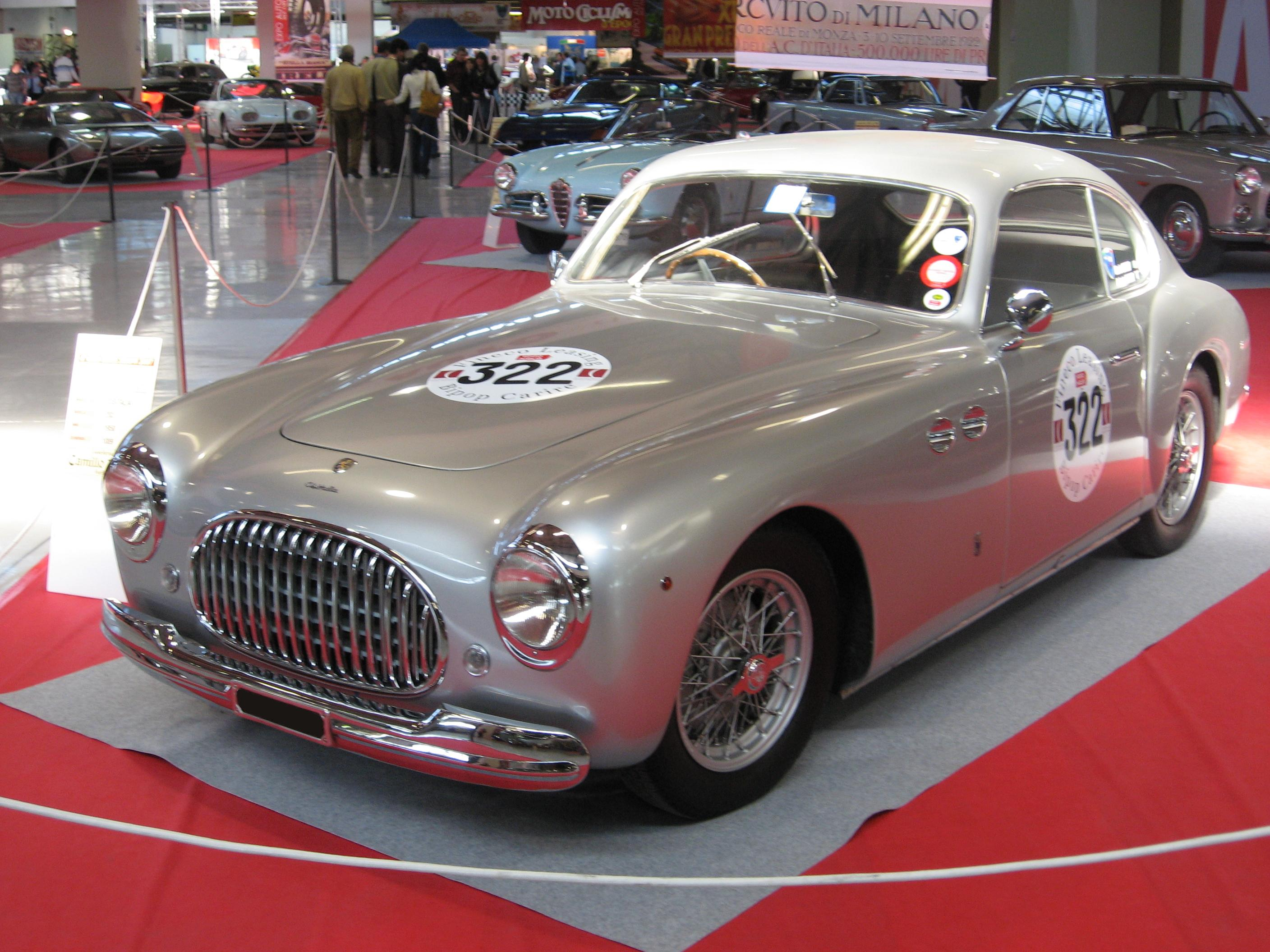
1946 Pininfarina Cisitalia 202

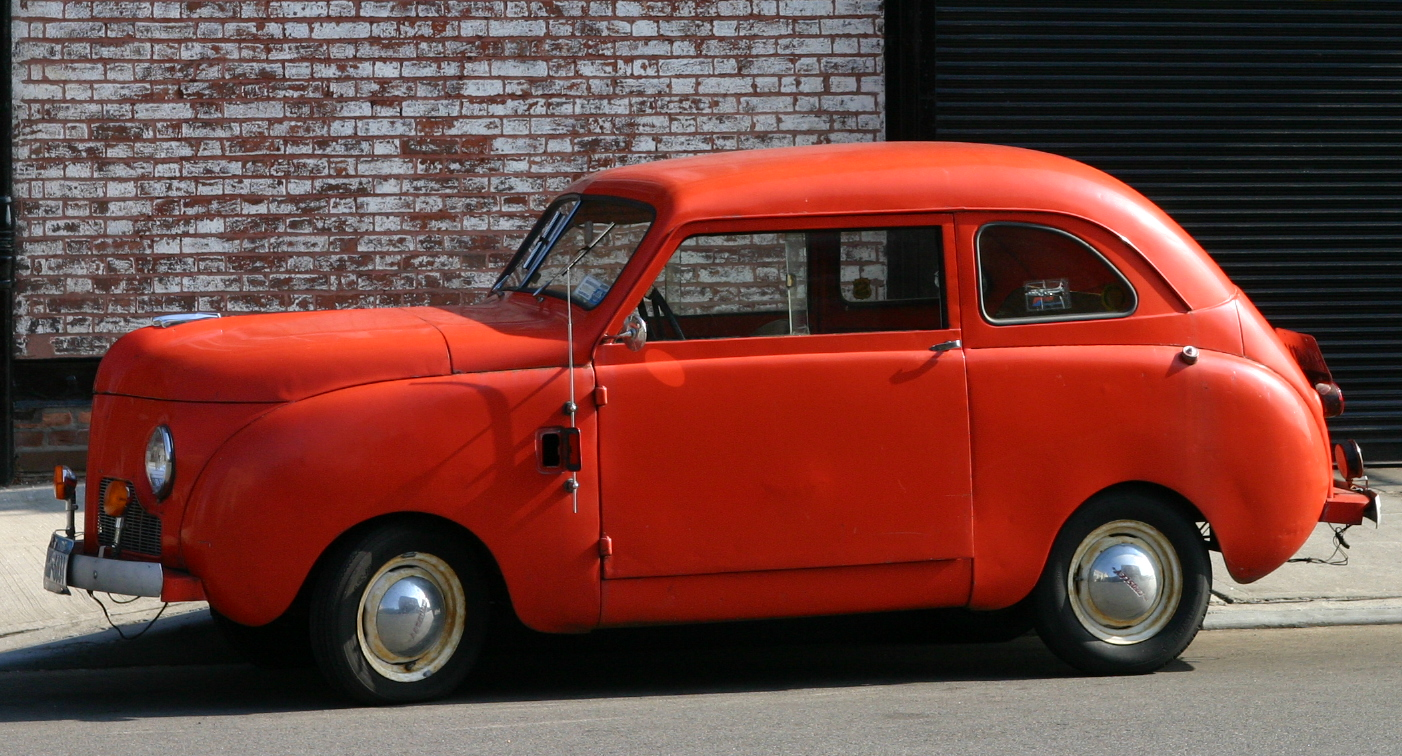
1946 Crosley CC Sedan

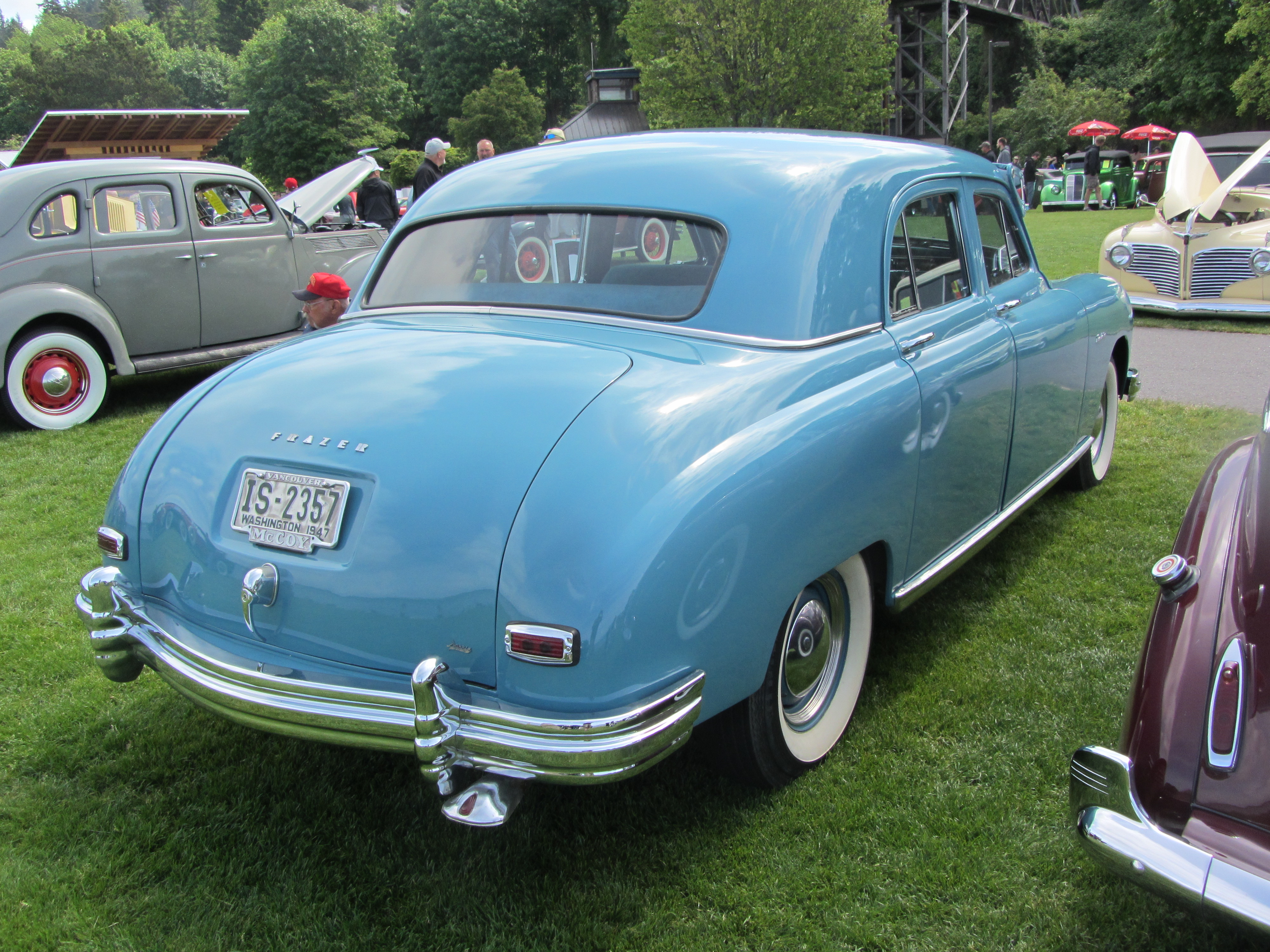
1947 Frazer Manhattan

== Origin of the trend ==
In 1921, Hungarian aerodynamicist Paul Jaray requested a patent for a streamlined car with an evenly shaped lower body, that covers the wheels and runs parallel to the floor space. A year later he presented his first running prototype with such a body, the "Ley T6", and in 1923 Auto Union presented a streamliner concept car, designed by Jaray.

Another of the first known cars with a ponton body is the Bugatti Type 32 "Tank" which participated in the 1923 French Grand Prix at Tours.

In 1922, the Romanian engineer Aurel Persu filed a patent application for an "aerodynamically-shaped automobile with the wheels mounted inside the aerodynamic body" having a drag coefficient of only 0.22, and he received it in Germany in 1924. Named the Persu Streamliner, the car was built in Germany by Persu, with the help of several local companies. During his research, Persu established that the most adequate aerodynamic shape was that of a water droplet falling to the ground.

In 1924, Fidelis Böhler designed one of the first production cars with a ponton body, the Hanomag 2/10. The car's body resembled a loaf of bread earning it the sobriquet of "Kommissbrot"—a coarse whole grain bread as issued by the army. The economical car was produced from 1924 to 1928. Böhler built the core body around two side-by-side passenger seats. He dispensed with running boards and integrated the fenders in the body to save on weight." The inexpensive car became popular with consumers in Germany.

In 1935, Vittorio Jano, working with the brothers Gino and Oscar Jankovitz, created a one-off mid-engine prototype on an Alfa Romeo 6C 2300 chassis, which Jano had shipped to Fiume in 1934. The brothers Jankovitz had been close friends with designer Paul Jaray, and the prototype, called the Alfa Romeo Aerodinamica Spider, featured ponton styling—an especially early and clear example of the bulbous, uninterrupted forms that would come to characterize the genre.

In 1937, Pinin Farina designed a flowing ponton-style body for the Lancia Aprilia berlinetta aerodynamica coupé, and also the open body on the 1940 Lancia Aprilia Cabriolet. Another Italian coachbuilder, Carrozzeria Touring produced Superleggera bodies for racing cars just before the start of the war. Among them: 1938 Alfa Romeo 8C 2900B Le Mans Speciale, 1939 Alfa Romeo 6C 2500 SS Berlinetta Aerodinamica and BMW 328 Touring Coupe.

== Post-WWII examples ==
The 1946 Cisitalia 202 coupé, which Farina designed from sketches by Cisitalia's Giovanni Savonuzzi, was the car that "transformed postwar automobile design" according to New York's Museum of Modern Art (MoMA). MoMA acquired an example for its permanent collection in 1951, noting that the car's "hood, body, fenders, and headlights are integral to the continuously flowing surface, rather than added on. Rounded, flowing forms, with unbroken horizontal lines between the fenders—the style had identified as "the so-called Ponton Side Design" became "the new fashion in Europe".

Two of the first American cars with fresh post-war styling, that adopted the new envelope body style, were the 1946 Frazer / Kaiser, and the 1946 Crosley CC series. The Howard "Dutch" Darrin-designed Frazer won the Fashion Academy of New York Gold Medal for design achievement, and was said to have been the inspiration for the 1949 Borgward Hansa 1500, Germany's first sedan in the ponton style.

In the Soviet Union, the GAZ-M20 Pobeda came into production in June 1946. This was within a couple days of the first 1946 Kaiser rolling off the production line. Only 23 cars were produced in 1946, however, and full scale production didn't begin until mid 1947.

In Britain, the Standard Vanguard went on sale in 1947. The 1947 Studebaker Champion, designed by Virgil Exner and Roy Cole featured an innovative rear end that "surprised Americans who smiled and asked: which way is it going?" However, the design is sometimes erroneously attributed to Raymond Loewy.

In 1948, the Czechoslovak Tatra 600 began production, a large, rear-engine design using an aeroplane inspired body style.

Ford and General Motors followed the trend with their own designs from 1949. Ford examples are the 1949 Ford (United States), the Ford Taunus P1 (Germany) and the Ford Zephyr (United Kingdom}). General Motors examples are the 1949 Chevrolet (United States), the Vauxhall Velox (United Kingdom, after 1951) and the Opel Kapitän (Germany, after 1953).

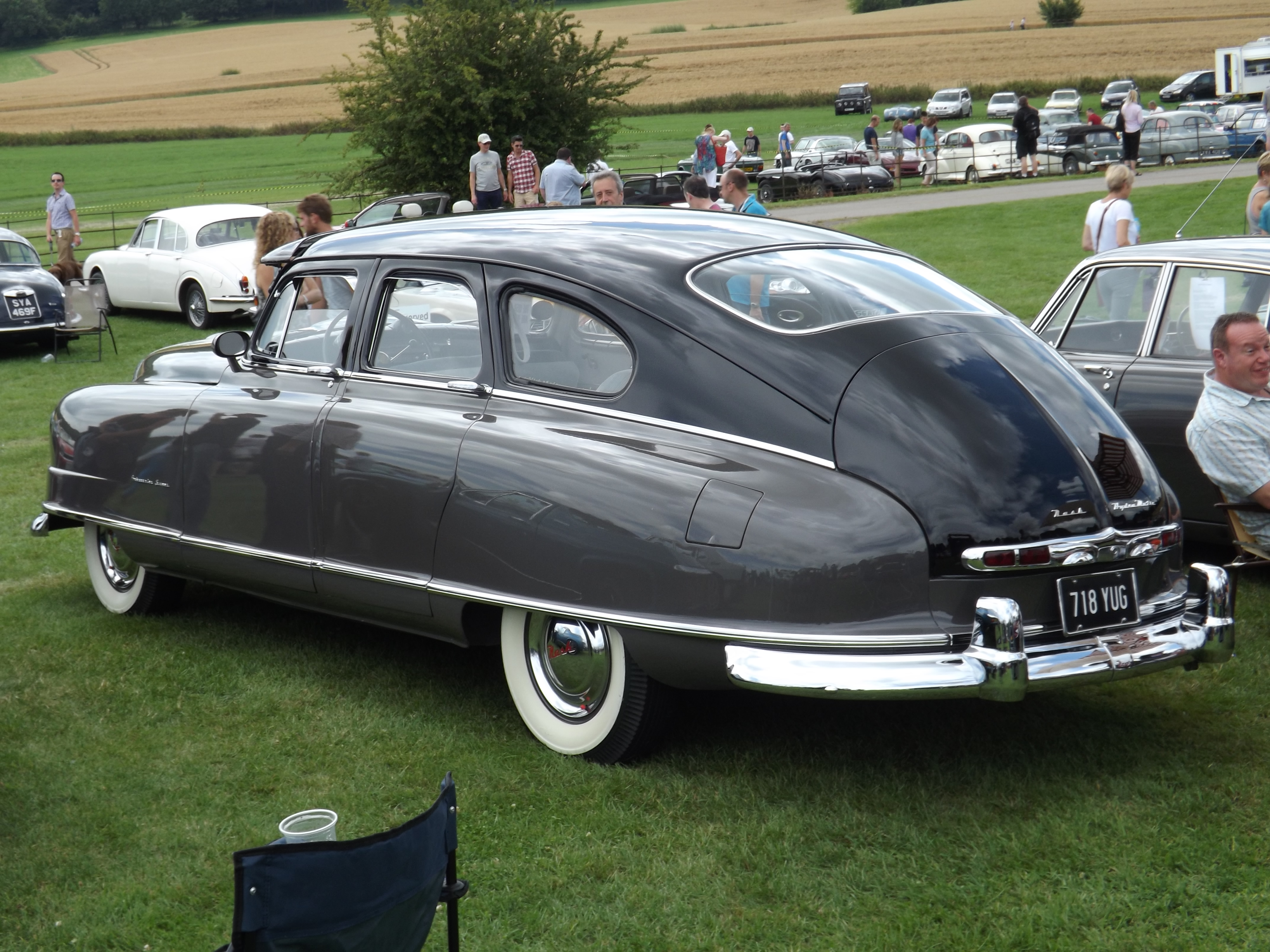
1950 Nash Ambassador

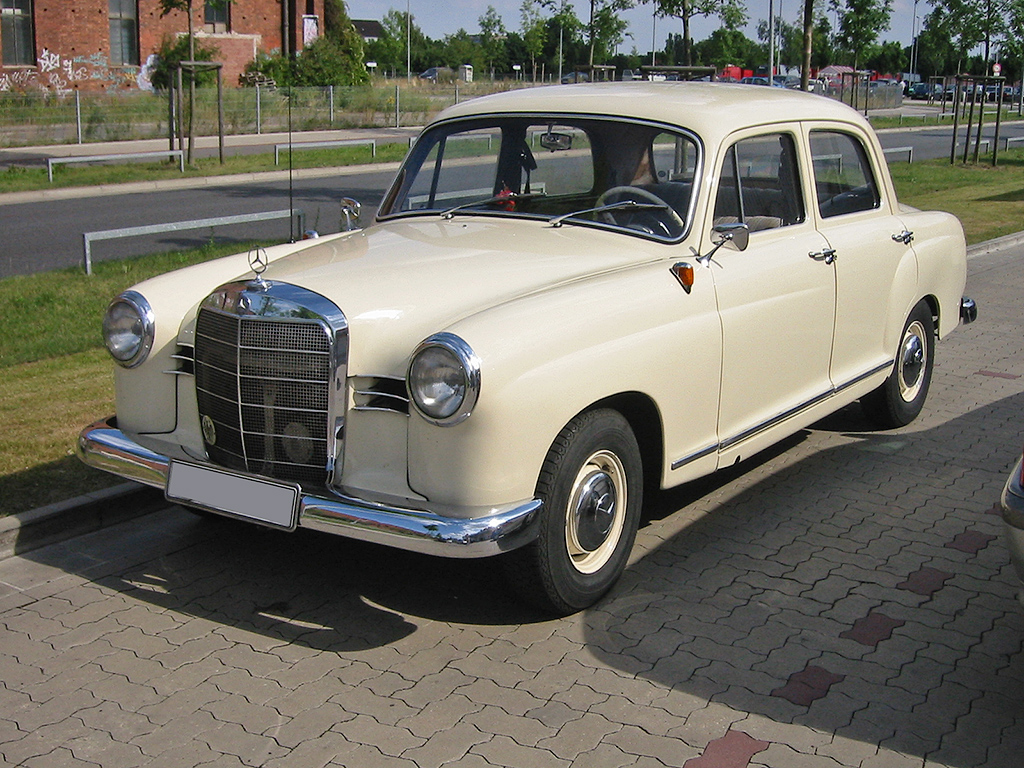
1954 Mercedes-Benz 180, a "Ponton" model

One of the earliest completely new styled cars that were introduced after World War II in the United States were the 1949 Nash models. Popular Science magazine described the new "pontoon" Nashes as "the most obvious departure from previous designs." They "carried the fender less pontoon-body, fast-back shape further than the competition." This Nash design became a "family appearance" for their automobiles that also included the Nash-Healey. The 1952 redesign of the two-seat sports car took on an "even closer family appearance" to the redesigned Nash models by featuring "pontoon-type fenders fore and aft." The new styling also moved the headlights "from the pontoon fenders to the grille."

The term is also used in reference to Mercedes-Benz models from 1953 to 1962. For example, a book about the marque refers to "the Ponton", the "Ponton saloon", "Ponton 220", "Ponton 220S and SE coupes and cabriolets", and "the Ponton models".

A General Motors document refers to the 1953 Olympia Record as "the first Opel with a full-width, or ponton, body shell".

The Volkswagen Beetle carried articulated running boards and fenders, but the subsequent Volkswagen Type 3 became known for its ponton styling; in the Netherlands the Volkswagen Type 3 (1961–1974) 2-door notchback sedan was referred to as the Ponton.

In a reference work on alternative-energy vehicles, electrical-engineering academics used the term as a generic for saloon cars with three-box design; also a 2007 German work on car design and technology mentions a "Rover-Ponton" (ponton-style Rover); and a French book on art and design also used the term in an automotive context in 1996.

== Ponton fenders ==
Pontoon fenders

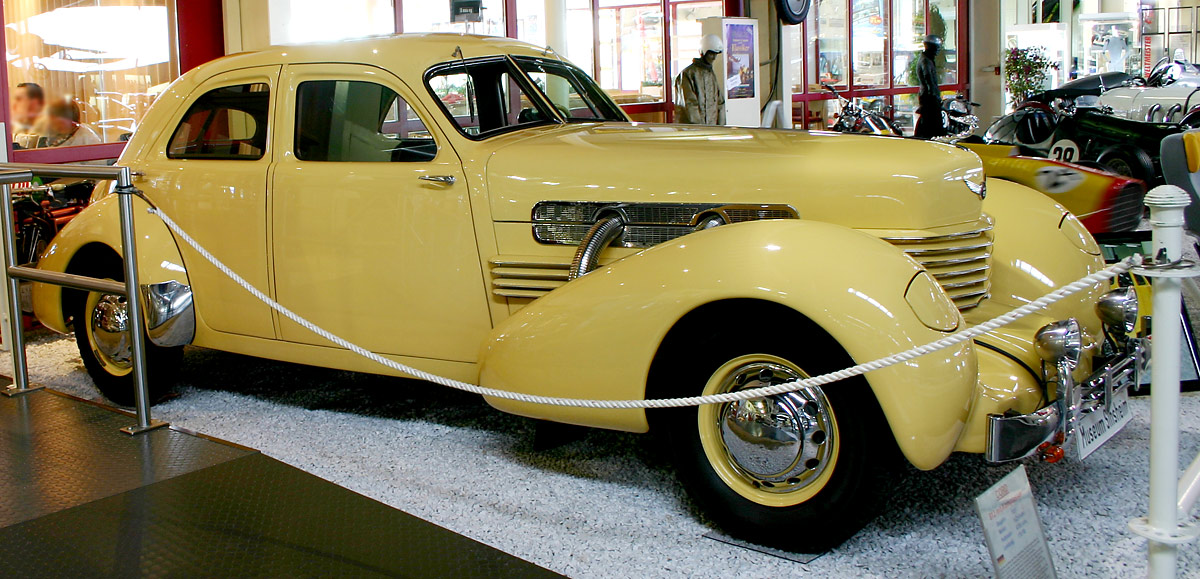
1937 Cord 812 with the earlier type of pontoon fender

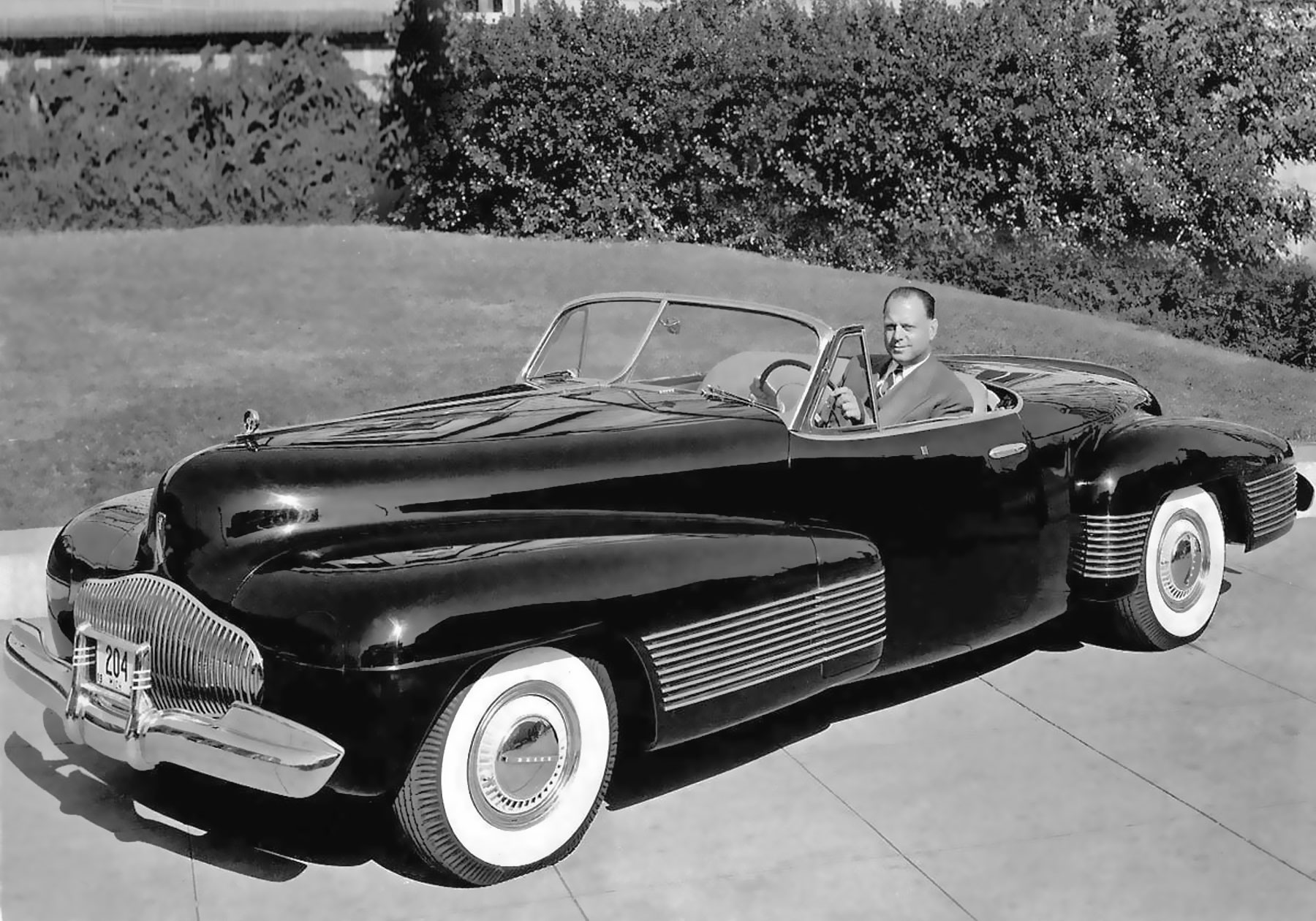
1939 Buick Y-Job concept car

Pontoon fenders are a type of automobile fender, or "wings" as they are more usually called in the United Kingdom.

Originally the term referred to a design prevalent in the United States in the 1930s where front fenders encased a wheel and terminated in a teardrop point, remaining distinct from the running boards or the body of the car. Examples include the Cord 810/812, the Auburn Speedster and several designs by French Carrossiers, notably Figoni et Falaschi.

In 1938, The Buick Y-Job, the auto industry's first concept car was "meant to be a vision of the future of the automobile and test the reaction of customers to the new design with streamline and ponton elements", displaying a further degree of integration of the pontoon fenders with the main body of the car.

Subsequently, the term pontoon fender took on another more prominent definition, derived from the wartime practice in Germany of adding full-length tread armor along each side of a tank, attached primarily on the top edge—and resembling pontoons. As this roughly coincided with the automobile styling trend where distinct running boards and articulated fenders became less common — with cars carrying integrated front fenders and full-width, full-length bodywork — the fenders took on the "pontoon fender" nickname.

The post-war trend of the markedly round, slab-sided designs became itself known as ponton styling—with many postwar Mercedes-Benz models informally nicknamed the "Ponton".

The British assumed the latter definition, using it in such works as the Beaulieu National Motor Museum Encyclopaedia of the Automobile.

== Gallery ==
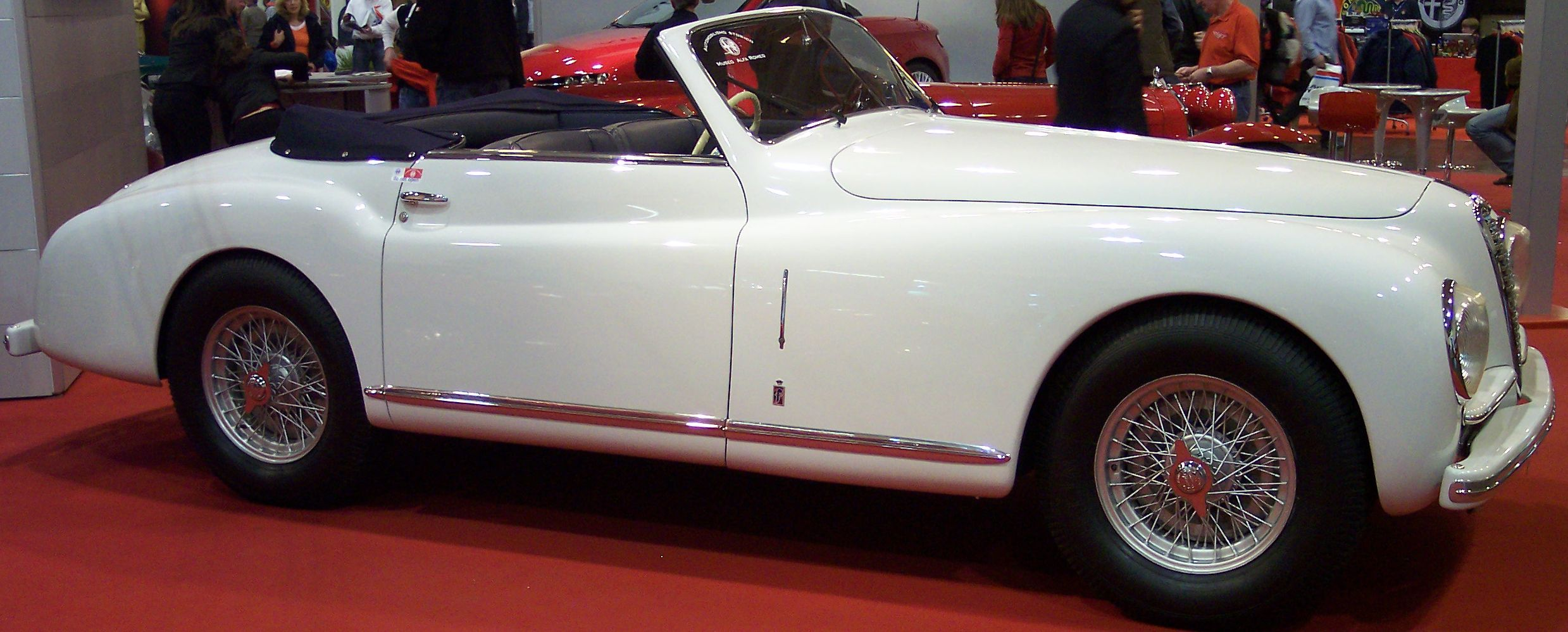
Farina-designed 1947 Alfa Romeo 6C 2300 SC

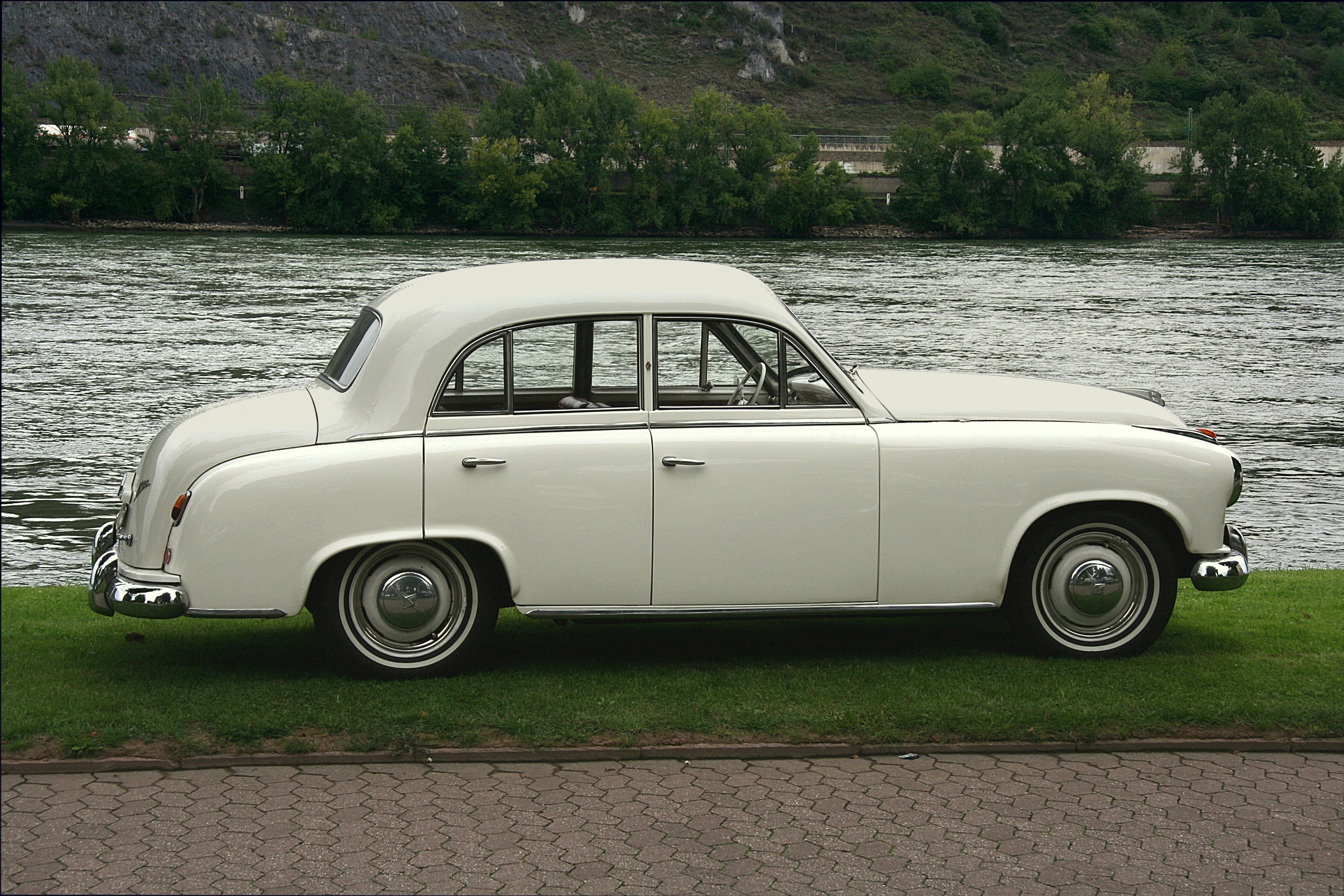
1952 Borgward Hansa 1800

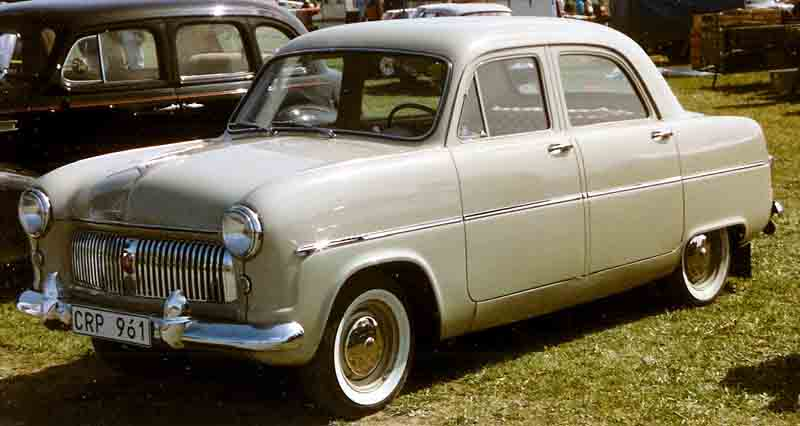
1950 Ford (GB) Consul

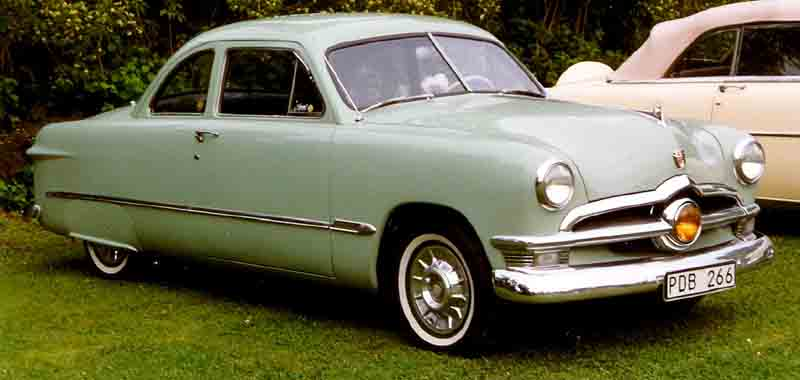
1950 Ford (USA) Club Coupe

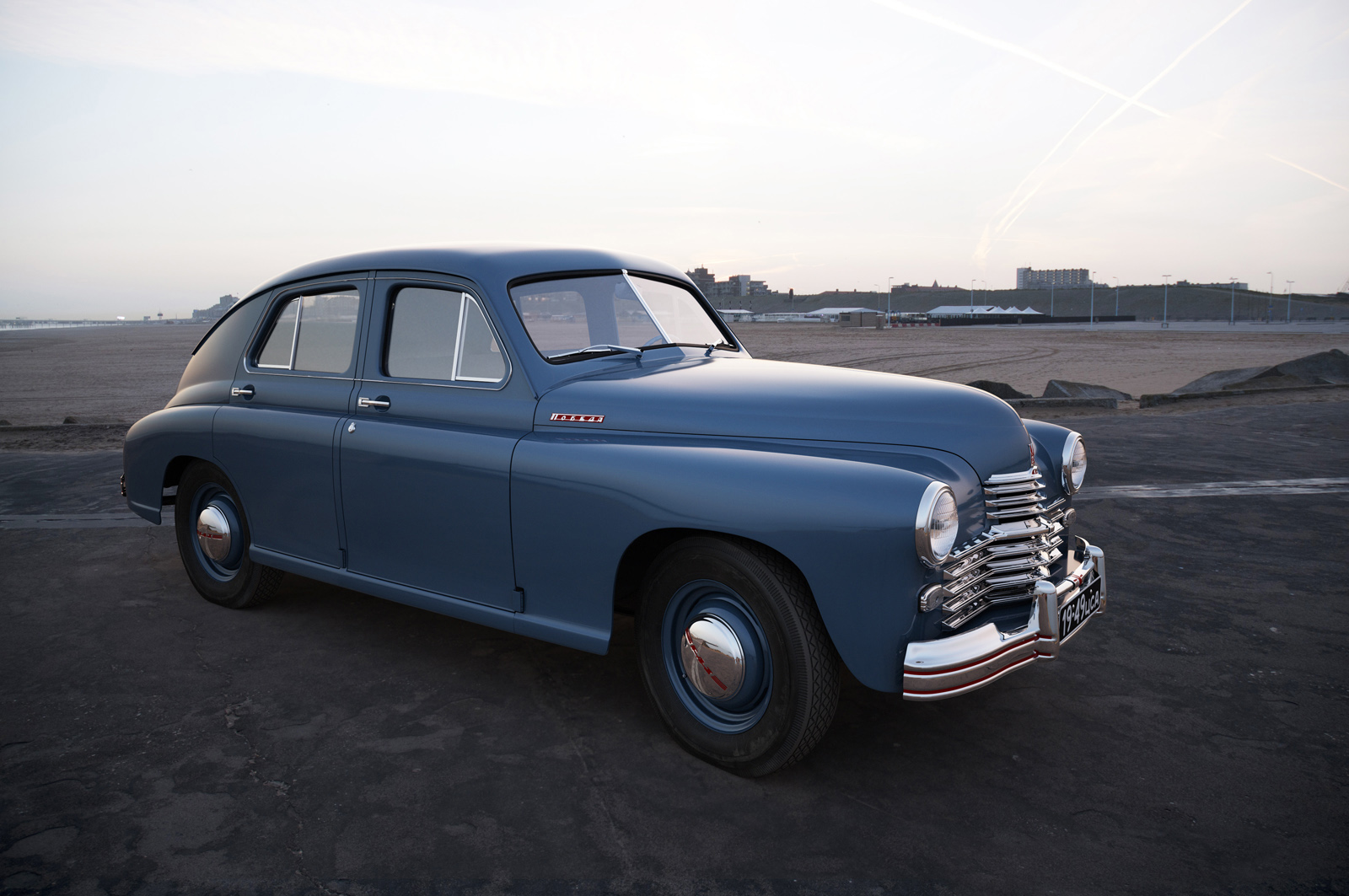
Russian GAZ-M-20 from 1946

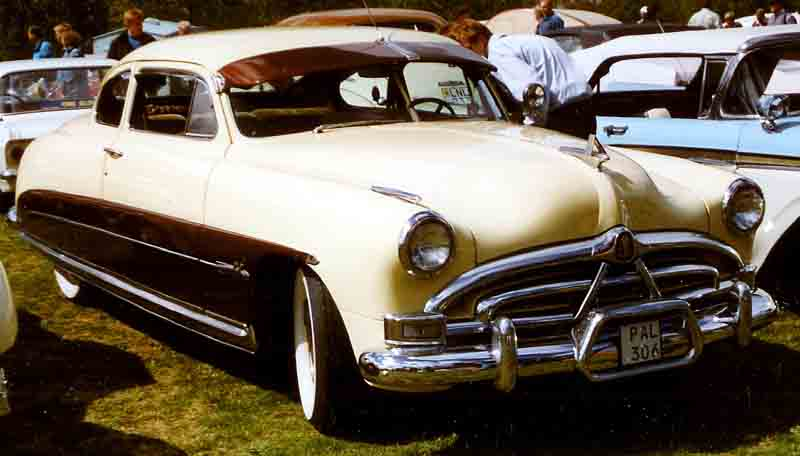
1951 Hudson Hornet coupe

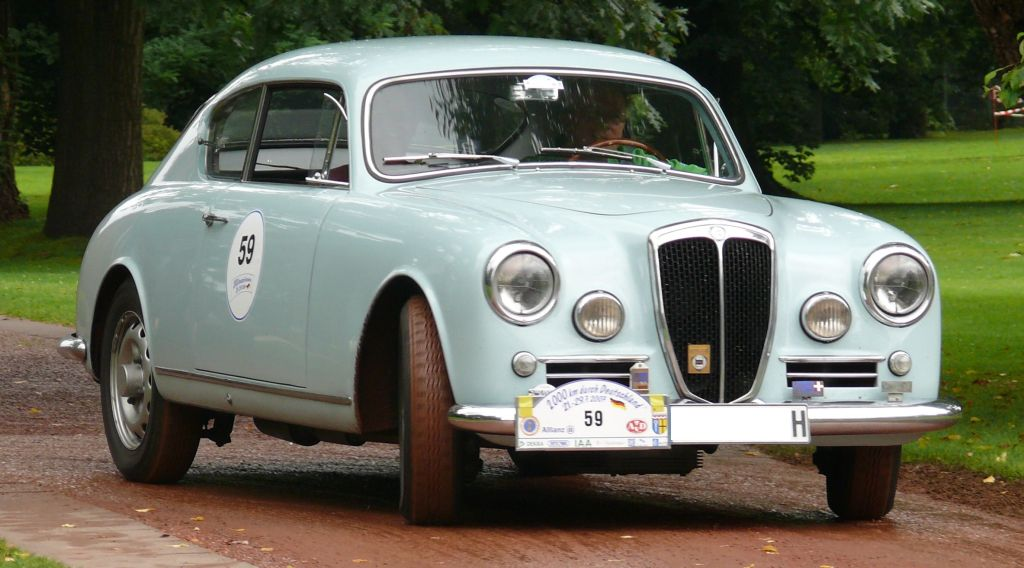
1950–1958 Lancia Aurelia B20

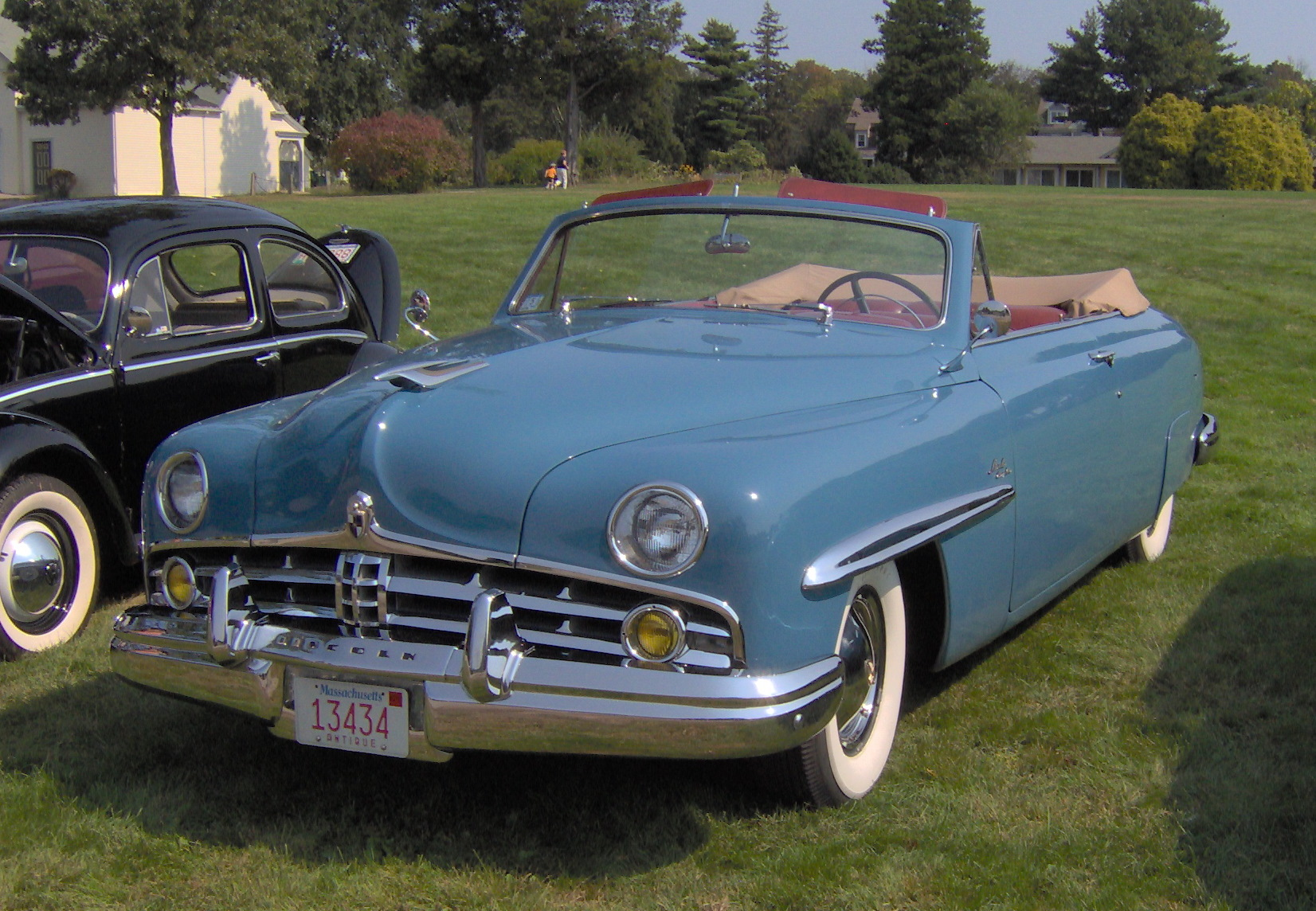
1949 Lincoln Cosmopolitian

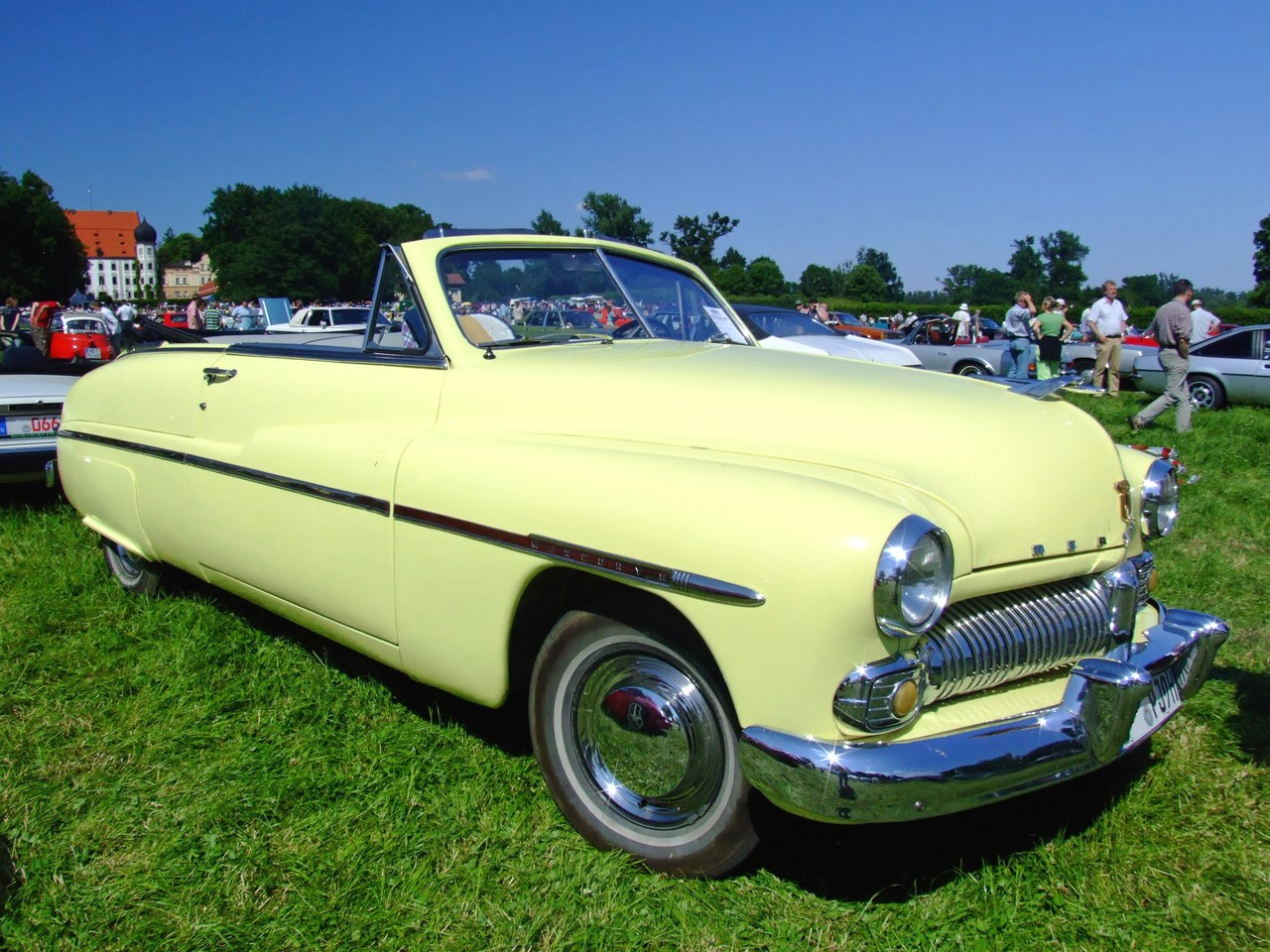
1949–51 Mercury Eight

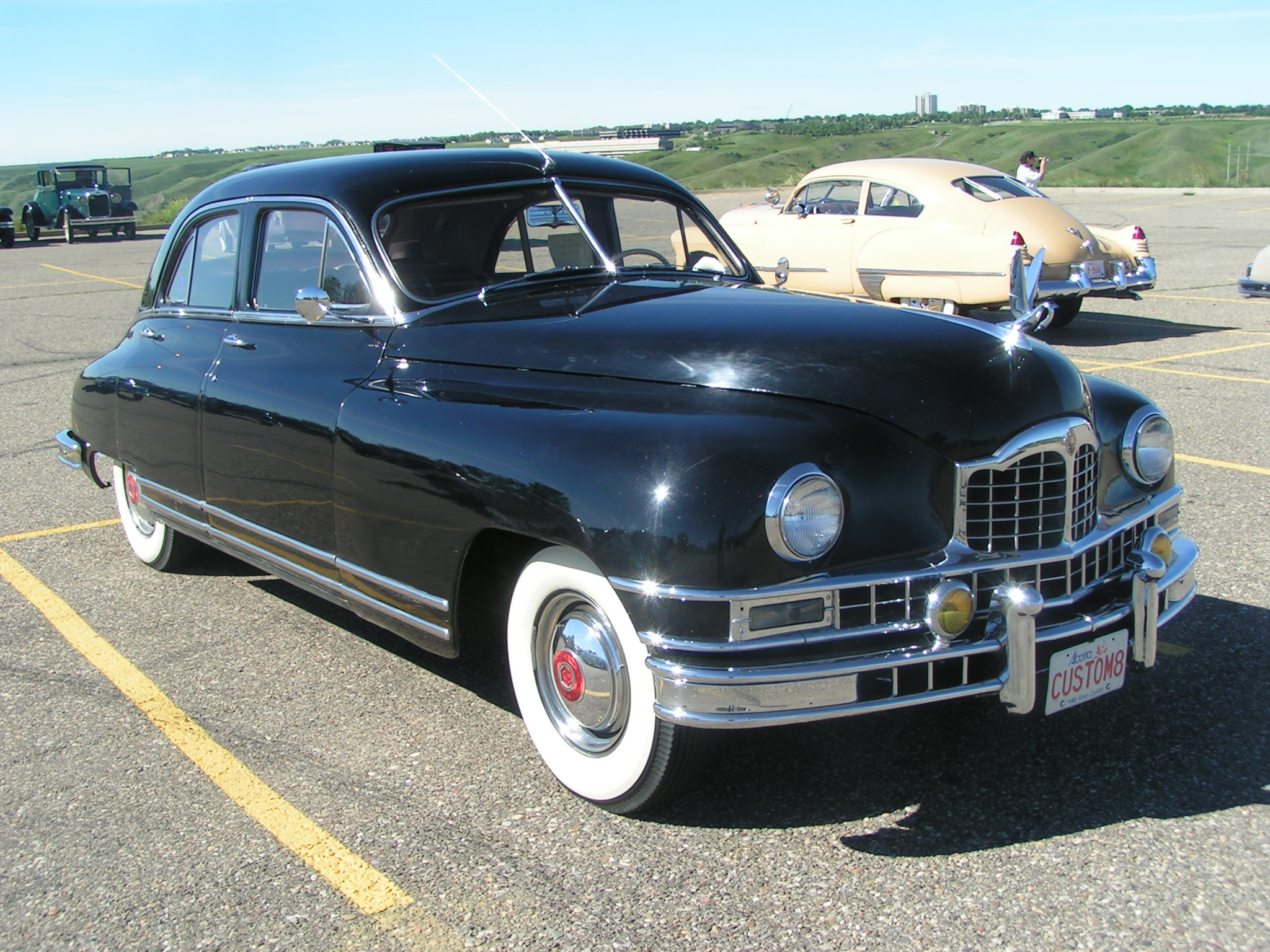
1948-1950 Packard Custom Super Eight

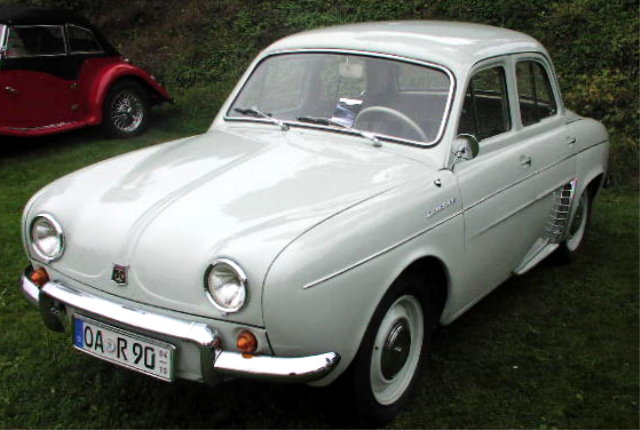
1956–1967 Renault Dauphine

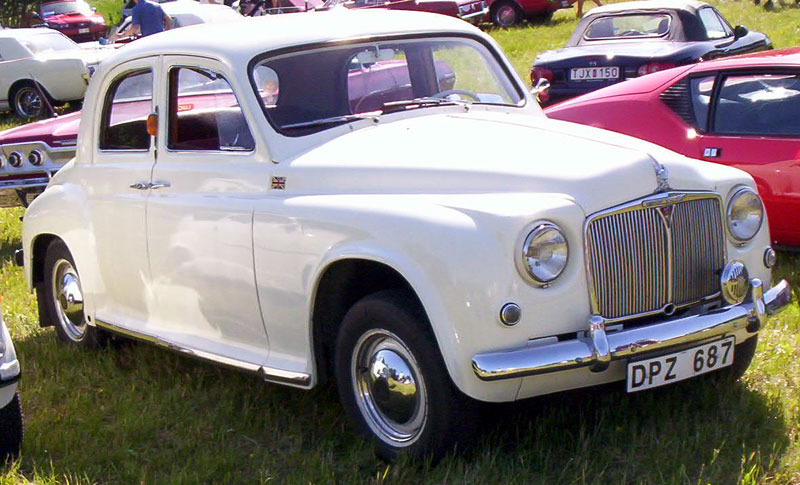
1952 Rover 75

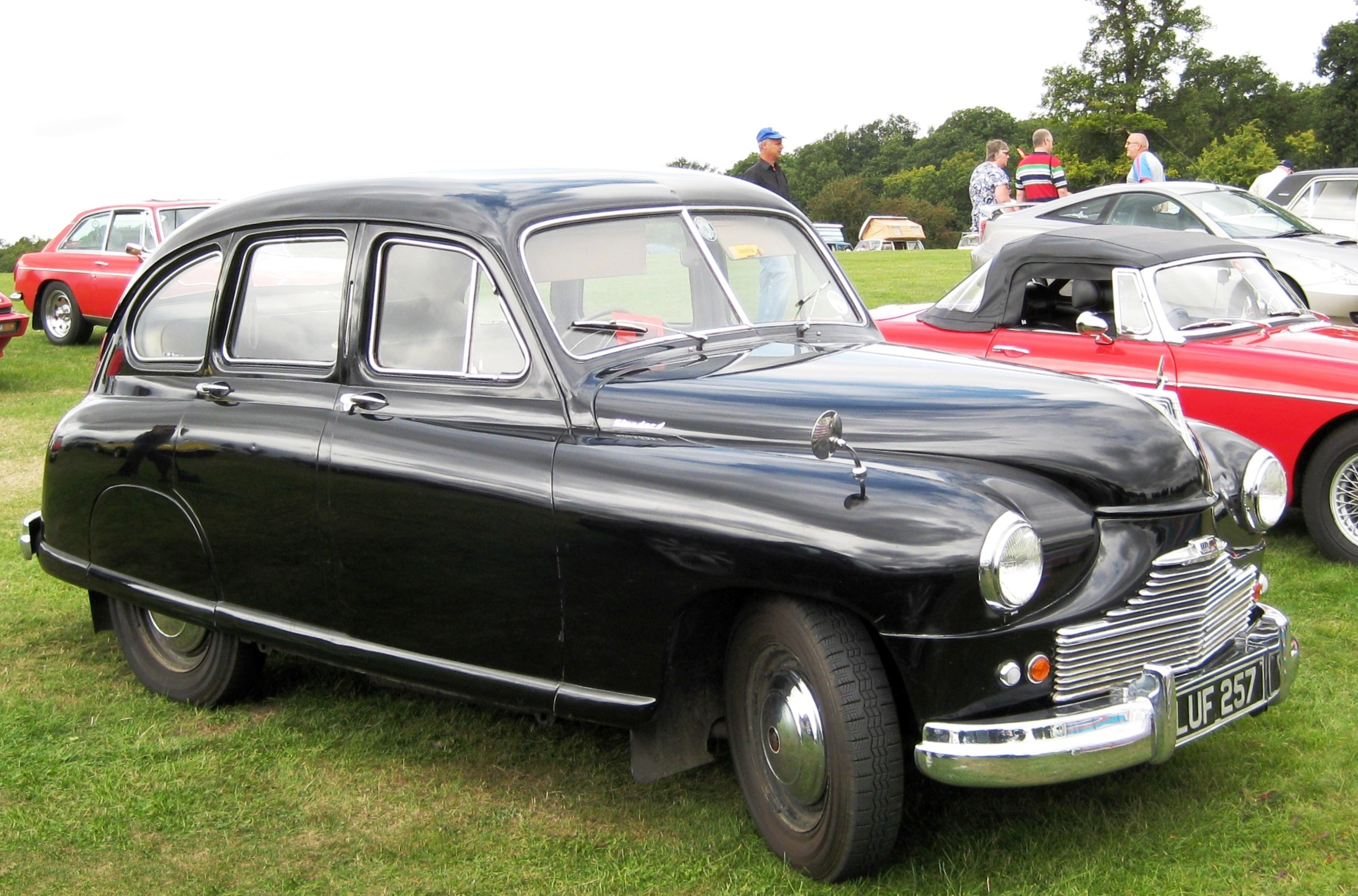
1951 Standard Vanguard

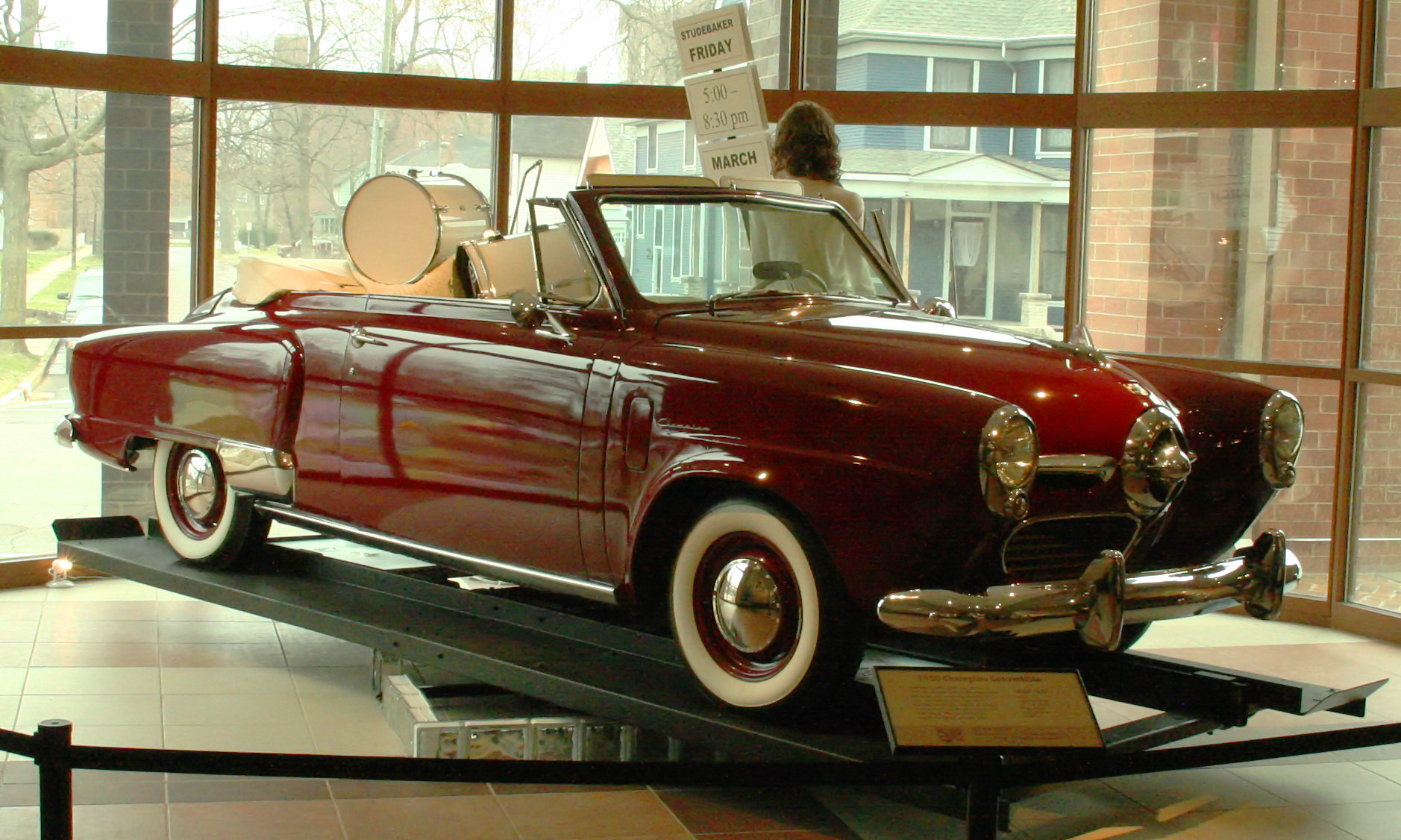
1950 Studebaker Champion

Subaru 1500

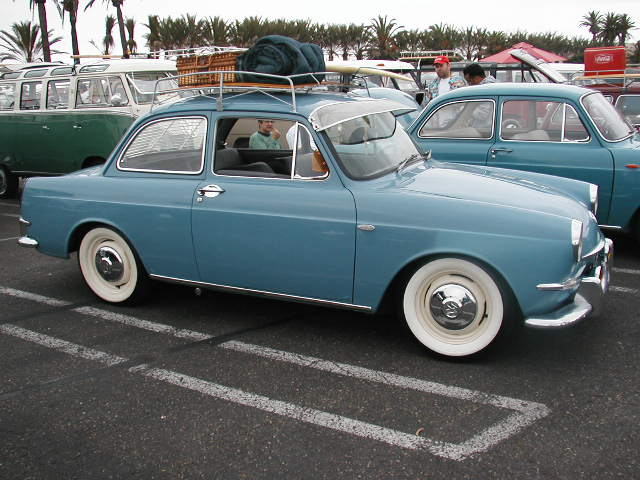
1961–1974 Volkswagen Type 3, sometimes called "ponton" in the Netherlands

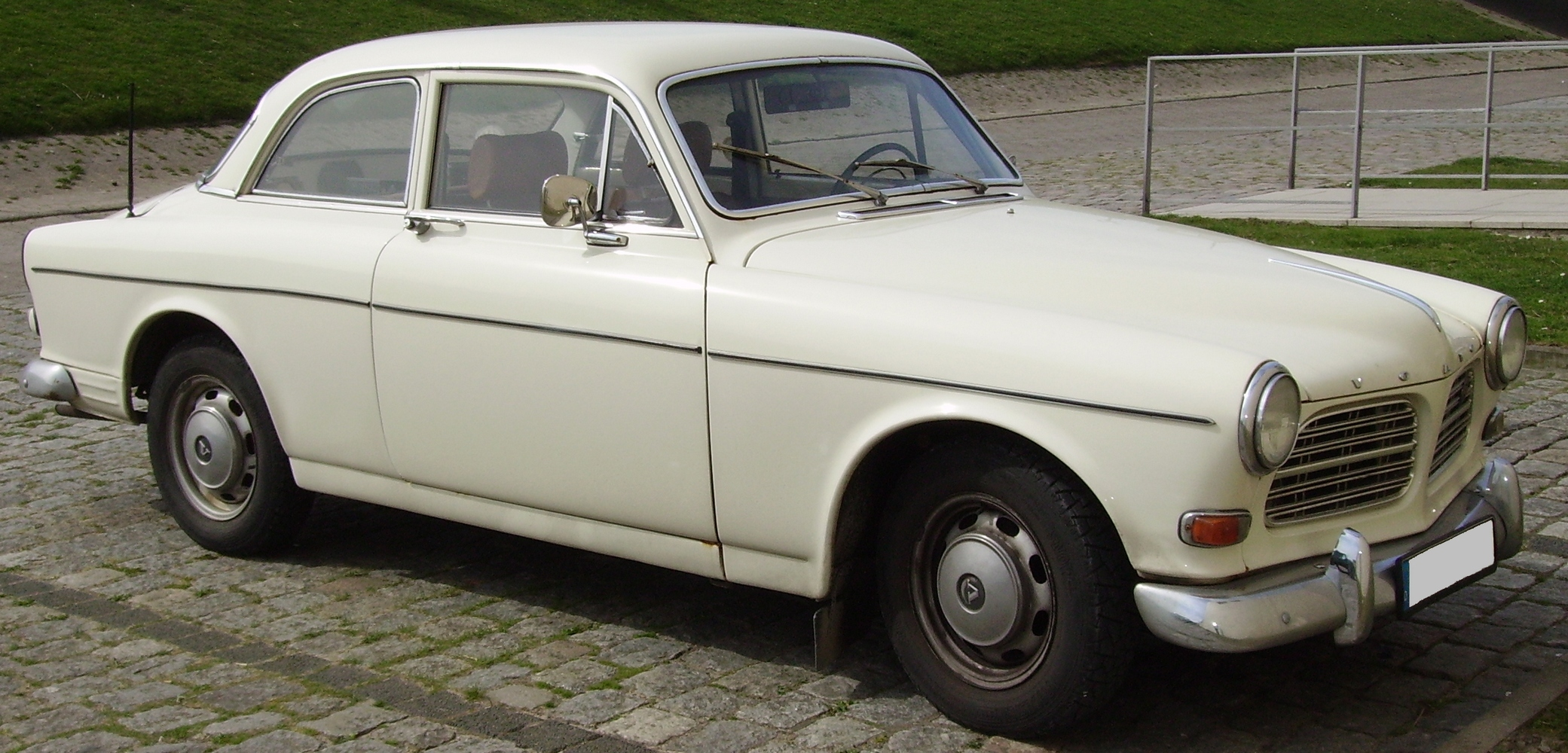
1956–1970 Volvo Amazon

== See also ==
- Glossary of automotive design
