= K-brot =

German potato and rye wartime bread

K-Brot was a potato and rye wartime bread in Germany during the First World War. In response to severe grain shortages the contents of k-brot were set by legislation to contain 5 per cent potato in rye breads. This type of bread was consumed almost entirely by the German working class who complained that the loaves lacked a proper crust and were generally inferior to good bread. Those who could afford it continued to purchase bread and cake baked with unadulterated wheat flour. Later in the war as grain grew more scarce the percentage of potato added to the loaves increased to as much as 20 per cent in the KK-Brot made for the poorest Germans.

== Name ==
The name k-brot is a combination of abbreviations for "potato bread" (German: Kartoffelbrot) and war bread (German: Kriegsbrot).

== Background ==
During the war, food shortages in Germany were more severe than in the Allied countries. Germany was more dependent on food imports of milk, butter and meat. Domestic production was limited to staple crops of rye and potatoes, but even this was strained by the need for imported fertilizers. In Britain, the average man was still eating around 3,400 daily calories. By the second half of the war, German men had to get by with a 1,200 calorie diet. For women and poorer Germans it was even less. English blockades in fall 1914 were devastating. In 1915 neutral countries had entered into trade agreements with France and Britain prohibiting the export of dairy and essential grains to Germany. In 1916 Germany's desperation for food influenced its decision to fight in the aftermath of the Romanian campaign. Attempts to use submarine warfare to overcome the British blockade failed the following year and by mid-1917 Germany was almost fully relying on what food it could produce itself.

== Grain shortage ==
In the morning when I'm hungry
I eat a buttered roll
Along with it the schnapps tastes good
Out of my full bottle.

— Adolf Glassbrenner, Breakfast a 19th century German poem

Bread was scarce throughout the entire war. Germany did not have good soil for growing wheat and its imports were cut off by 1914. To make matters worse, with war looming in July 1914, German farmers followed through with promised rye exports to Russia.

For German workers bread rolls (German: Schrippen, Semmeln) were the main breakfast food and sandwiches (German: Stulle) were the staple mid-day "supper". These were the "bread meals". "Daily Bread" became the central theme in the eponymous column published in Vorwärts. Resentment grew among Germans as the consumption of bread became impossible for the working class. A contemporary song lamented that wages were "scarcely enough for dry bread".

== Growing unrest ==
To stave off the mounting unrest in the press and on the streets the imperial Bundesrat mandated that 5 per cent potato be used in the production of rye bread and "gray bread" (wheat/rye). This was called K-brot, a combination of the abbreviated forms of the German words for "war" and "potato bread" (krieg and kartoffelbrot, respectively). Only the poor ate the K-brot and lamented the lack of a good crisp crust on the bread. The bread was considered to be inferior. Those who could continued to consume all wheat breads and cakes, contributing to the public resentments that began to overlap with the sentiments of a collapsing "Germanness", as the German people no longer had the means to sustain the luxuries of modern life across class lines.

== See also ==
- Kommissbrot
