= Hanomag 2/10 PS =

Hanomag 2/10 PS "Kommissbrot"
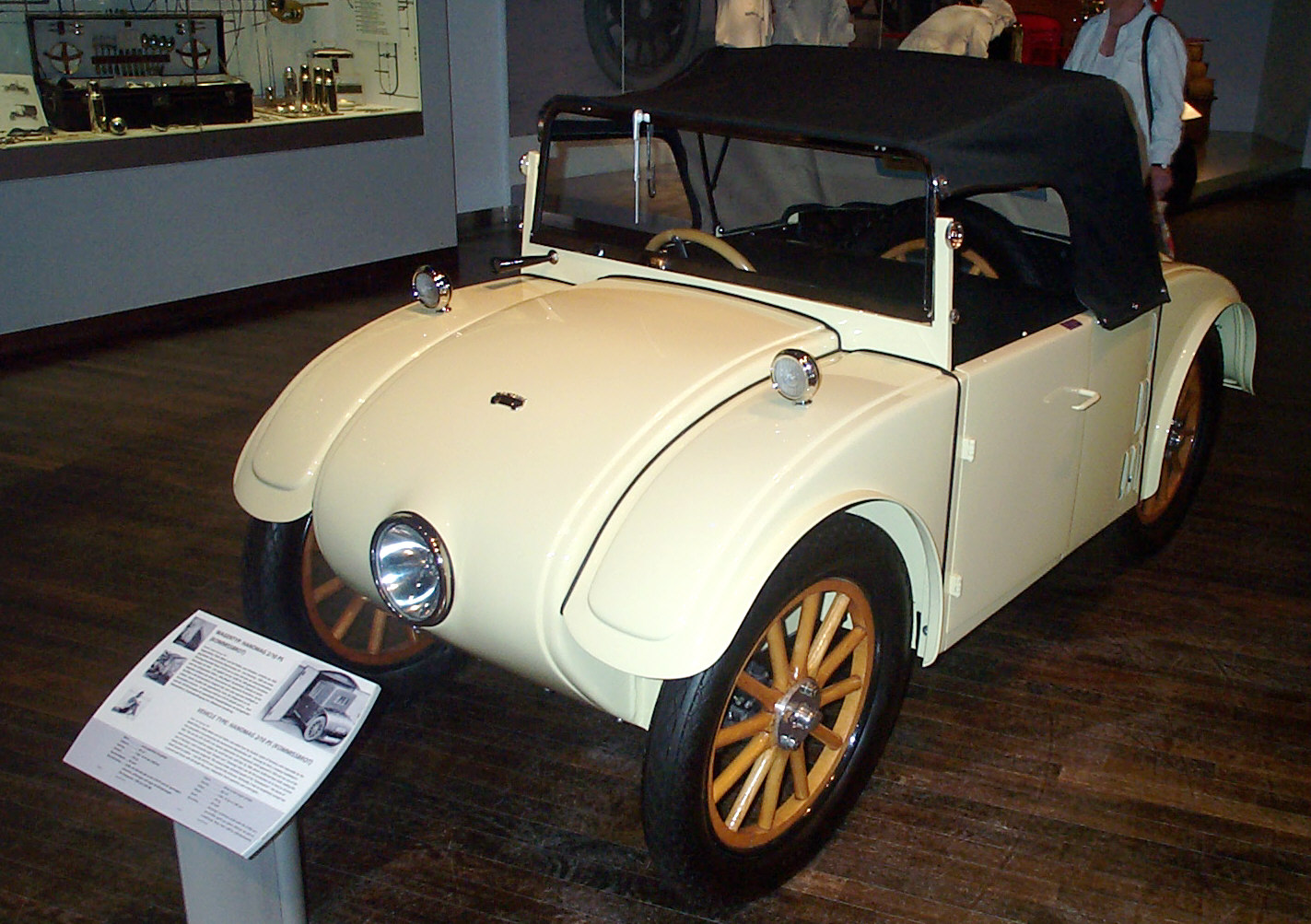

Overview
- Manufacturer: Hanomag
- Production: 1925–1928

Body and chassis
- Body style: coupe, roadster
- Layout: RMR layout

Powertrain
- Engine: 503 cc OHV single-cylinder engine, water-cooled.
- Transmission: Manual, 3-speed

Dimensions
- Wheelbase: 1920 mm
- Length: 2780 mm
- Width: 1180 mm
- Height: 1600 mm
- Kerb weight: 370 kg (816 lb)

Chronology
- Successor: Hanomag 3/16 PS

The Hanomag 2/10 PS is an economy car manufactured by Hanomag from 1924 until 1928. It was one of the first cars with envelope styling. It was affectionately referred to as the Kommissbrot ("Army Bread") due to its shape being reminiscent of the usual loaf of bread used by the German army at the time. "Kommiss" is German slang for "Army", short for "commissioned"

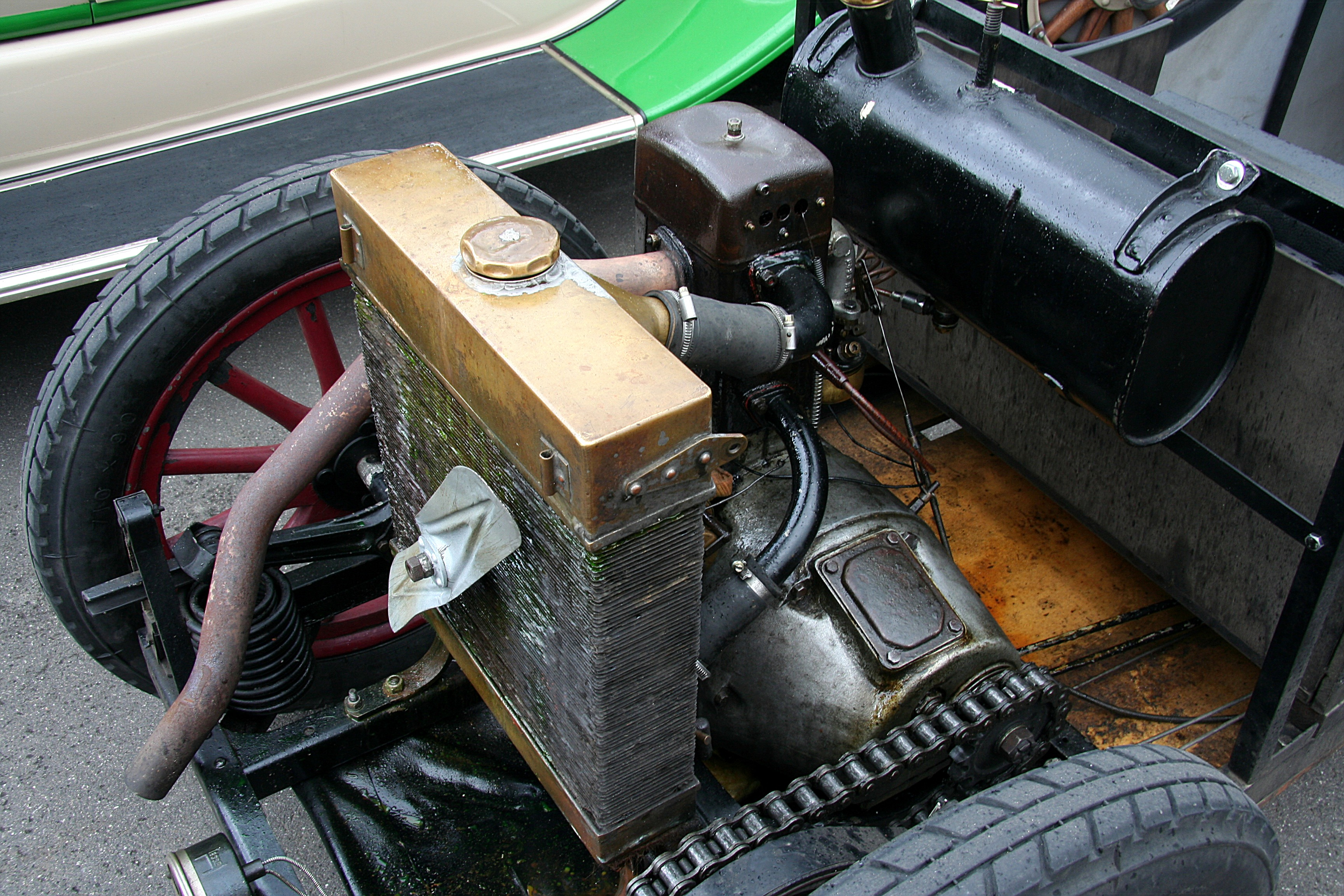
Drivetrain and radiator of a 2/10 PS

The 2/10 PS (two taxable / ten brake horsepower) had a single-cylinder half litre engine behind the passengers. The rear axle was chain-driven, with no differential. With a fuel consumption of 4.0 litres per 100 kilometres (71 mpg_{‑imp}; 59 mpg_{‑US}) it was the world's most fuel efficient mass-production car between the two World Wars due to the low-friction one-cylinder engine and its very light weight.

The fenders, or wings, of the 2/10 PS were integrated into the bodywork of the car, allowing the passenger space to be wider than it would have been with the traditional separate fenders and running board. The compact drivetrain allowed the floor to be lower, removing the need for a running board. The rounded appearance of the 2/10 PS, due to the envelope styling, earned it the nickname Kommissbrot after the inexpensive, flat-sided bread typically used by the military.

The 2/10 PS faced competition from the Opel Laubfrosch and the Dixi DA1 variant of the Austin 7. These cars were superior by nearly every measure and cost no more than the little Hanomag; the Kommissbrot was replaced in 1928 by the more conventional 3/16 PS model.

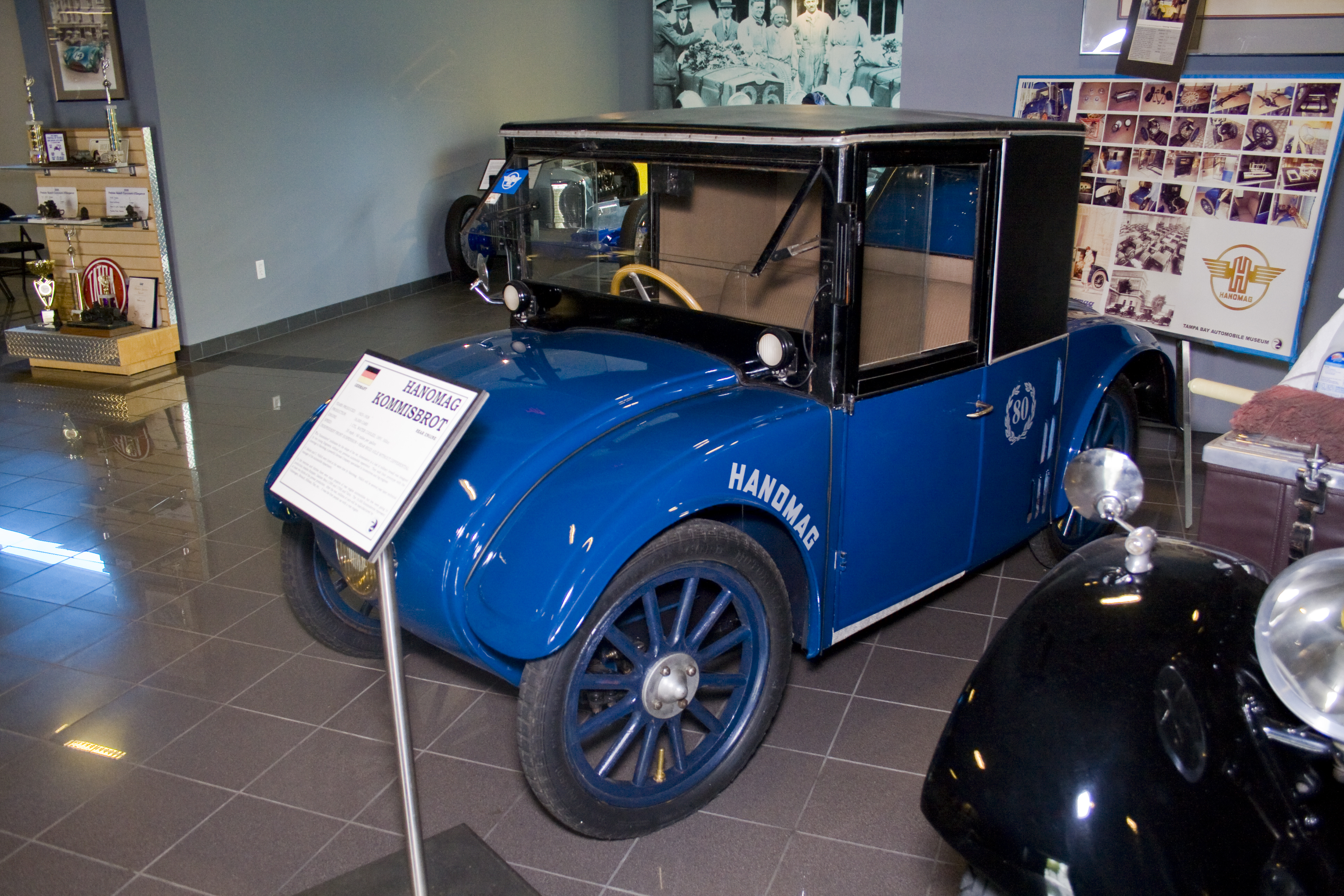
Hanomag 2/10 PS

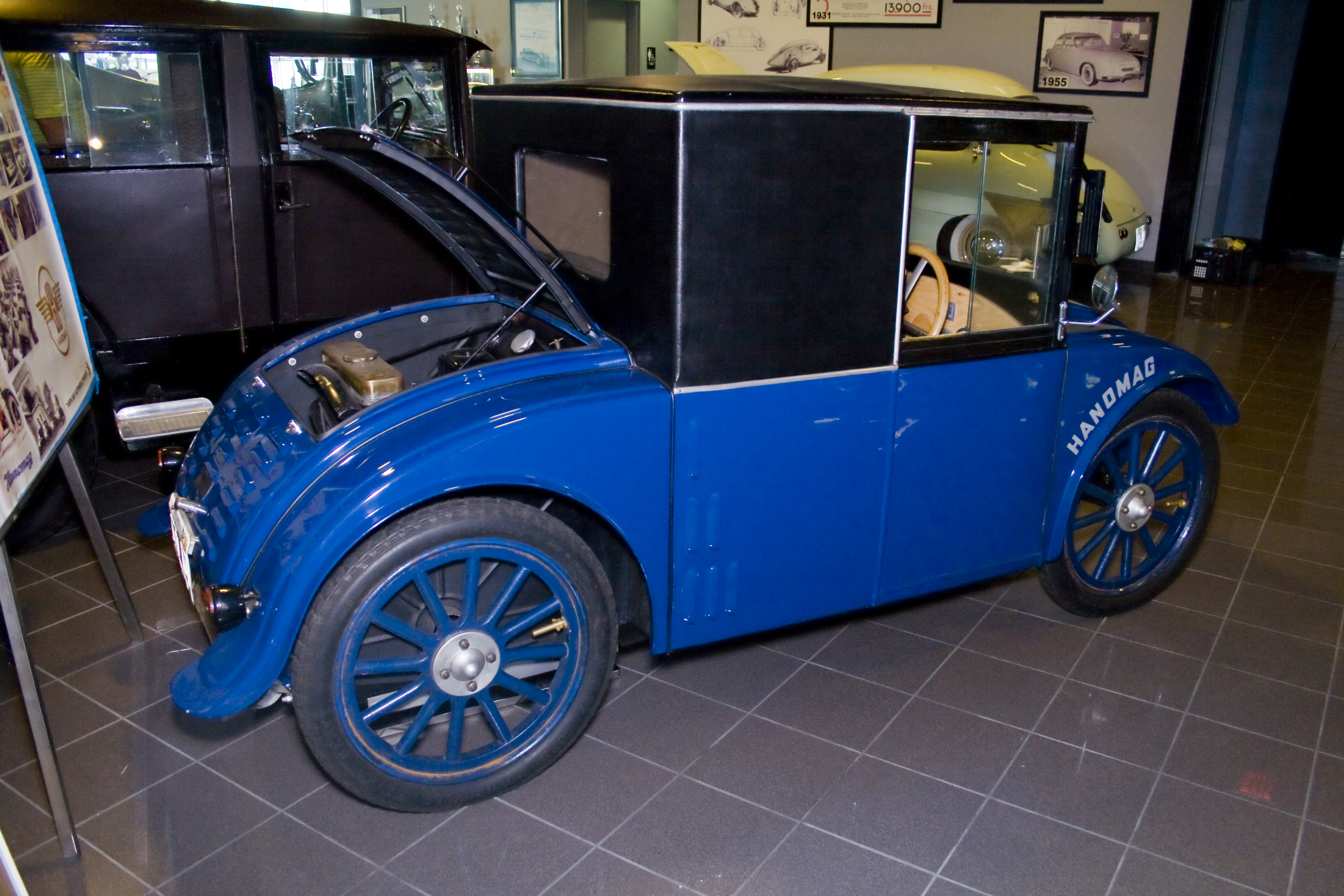
Hanomag 2/10 PS

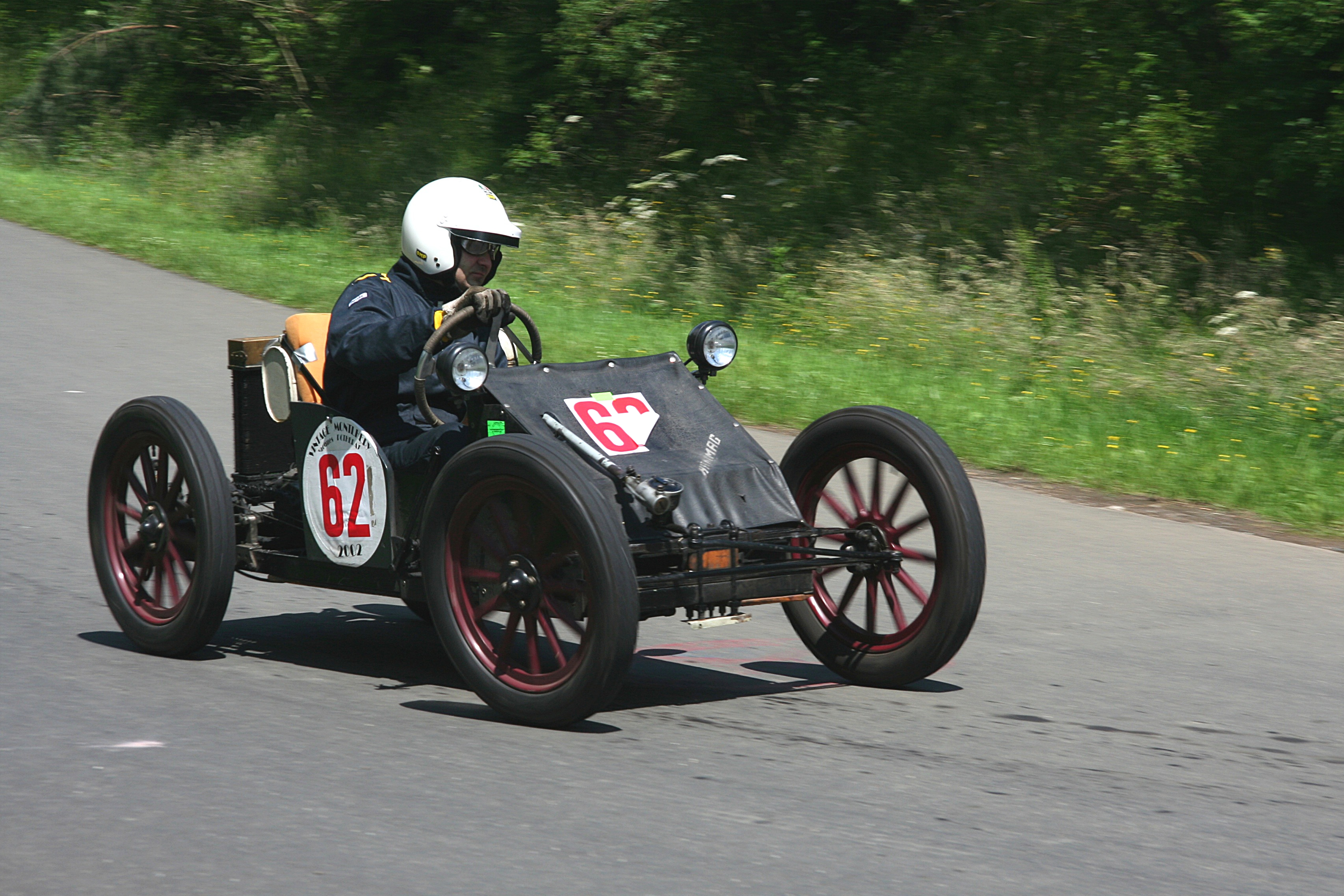
Racing version at Nürburgring

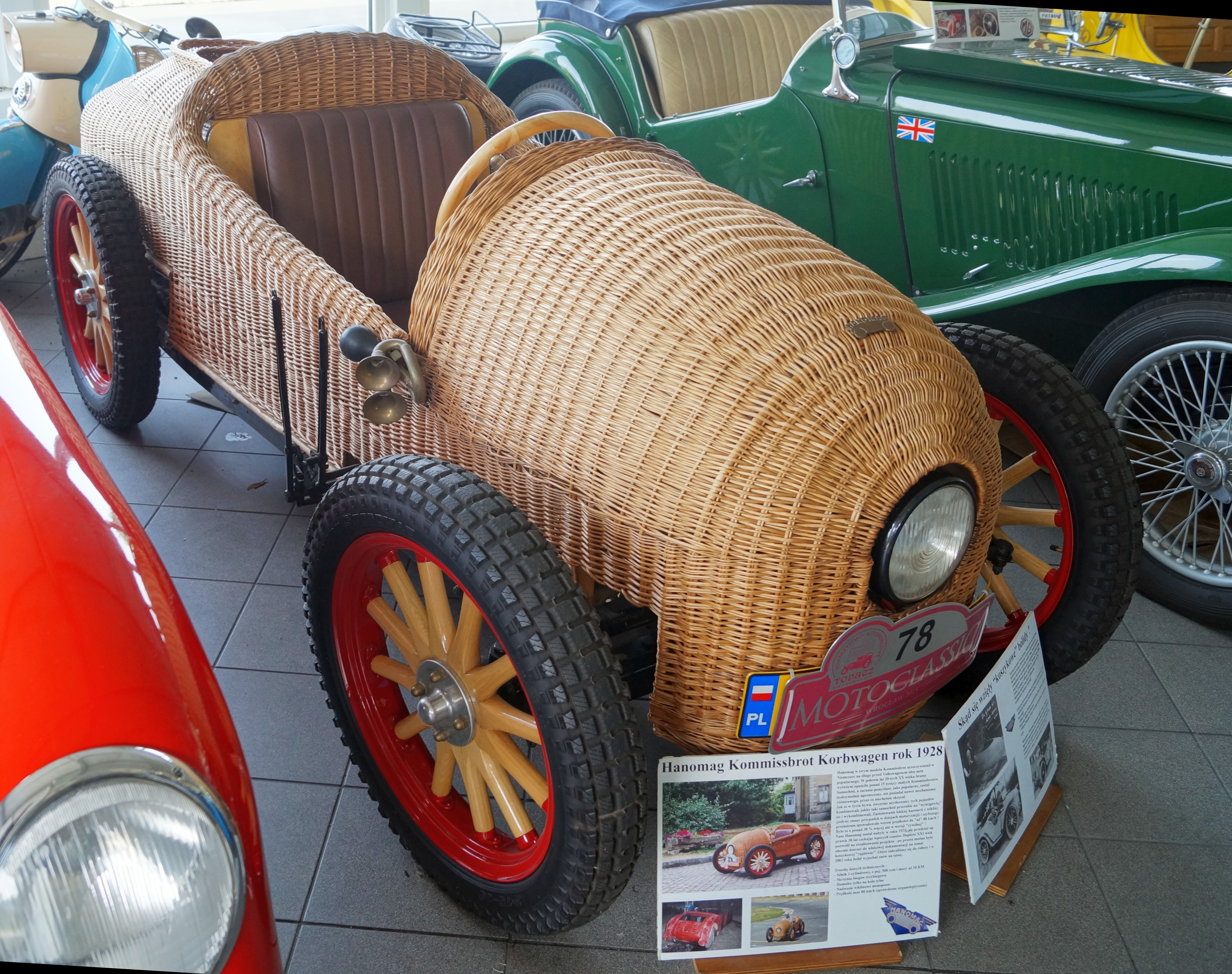
Racing version with a custom light-weight wicker body
