= Borodinsky bread =

Dark brown sourdough rye bread of Russian origin

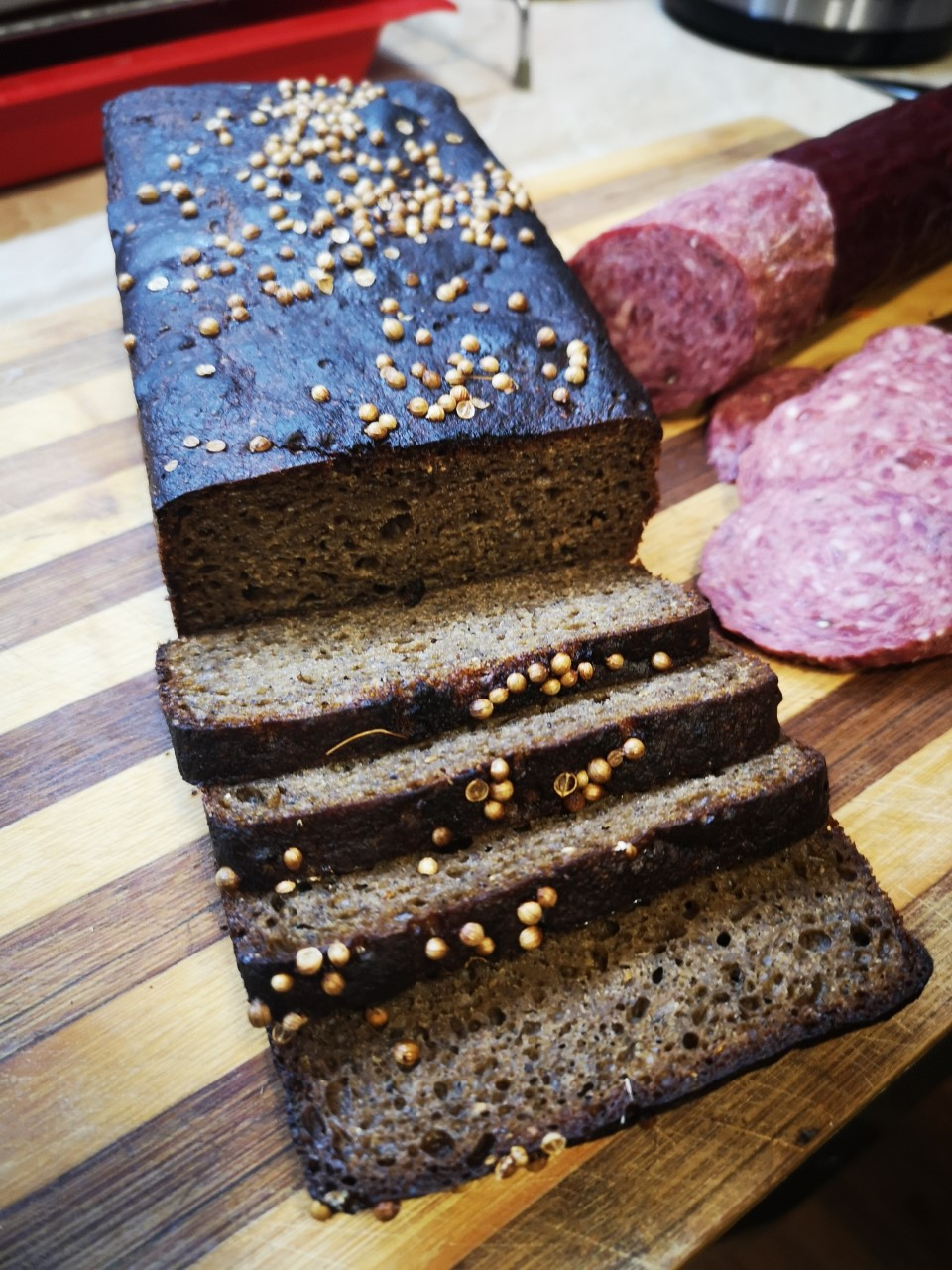
- Type: Bread
- Main ingredients: a mixture of rye and whole wheat flour, yeast, salt, barley malt syrup, black treacle or molasses, coriander and caraway seeds

Borodinsky bread (Russian: бородинский хлеб, romanized: borodinskiy khleb) or borodino bread is a dark brown sourdough rye bread of Russian origin, traditionally sweetened with molasses and flavored with coriander and caraway seeds.

== Preparation ==
Borodinsky bread has been traditionally made (with the definite recipe fixed by a ГОСТ 5309-50 standard) from a mixture of no less than 80% by weight of a whole-grain rye flour with about 15% of a second-grade wheat flour and about 5% of rye, or rarely, barley malt, often leavened by a separately prepared starter culture made like a choux pastry, by diluting the flour by a near-boiling (95-96 °C) water, and adding the yeast after cooling the mix to 65-67 °C, but then mostly inoculated by the previous batches of dough instead of the dry yeast.

It is then sweetened and colored with beet sugar molasses, and flavored with salt and spices, of which the coriander seed is required, and caraway is optional, but still quite popular. Modern recipes are often 100% whole rye.

A Borodinsky variety called ”supreme” consists of 100% rye (85% whole rye and 15% white rye flour) exists according to a pre-GOST recipe found in P.M. Plotnikov & M.F. Kolesnikov's 1940 book 350 Varieties of Bread.

== Legend of origin ==
Several legends exist regarding the etymology. The most popular one states that this bread traces its name to Margarita Tuchkova, a widow of Napoleonic Wars general Alexander Tuchkov, who perished at Battle of Borodino. His widow established a convent at a former battlefield, of which she eventually became an abbess, and its nuns had reportedly come up with the bread's recipe to serve at mourning events, thus, a dark, solemn color, and with round coriander seeds representing a deadly grapeshot.

Another legend that ties it to the Battle of Borodino mentions a food trailer containing caraway and rye flour that got blasted by a cannon, forcing the locals to recover the ingredients and use them together for the first time.

A third version states that composer and chemist Alexander Borodin brought the idea for the bread to Moscow from Italy where he got interested in local baking. Since rye was not widely cultivated in Southern Europe, this is the most easily dismissed version.

No sources support these legends, and the name of this bread most probably first appeared after the October Revolution (1917), as no mention of this name was made before 1920. The modern recipe did not appear in print before 1933, first in internal memos of a Moscow baking plant. However, in the literature of breadbaking of the end of 19th century, a number of similar recipes exist, though caraway seeds were usually used instead of coriander.

== See also ==
- Kommissbrot
- Ontbijtkoek
- List of Russian dishes
