= Kommissbrot =

Type of German bread

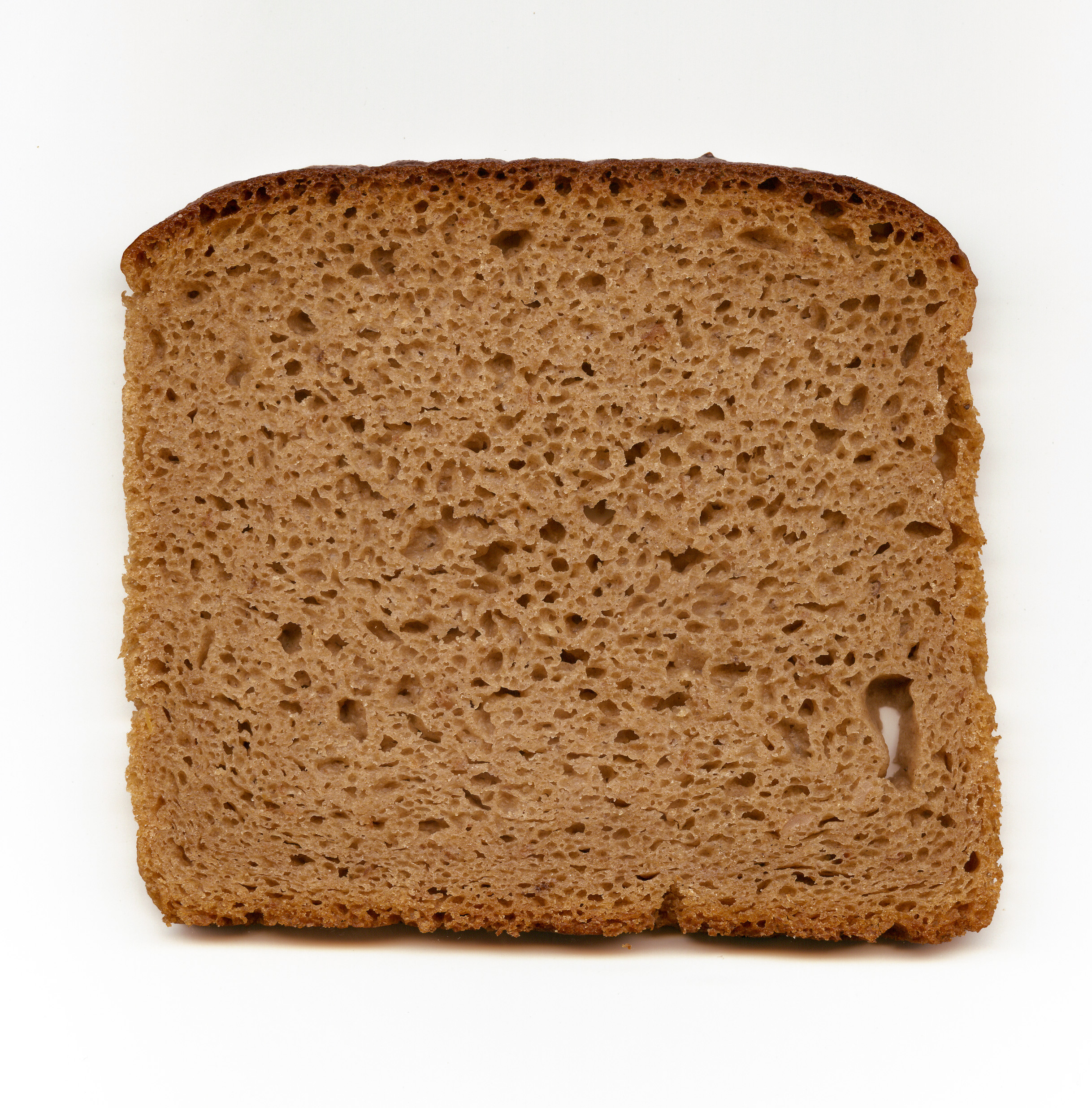
- Type: Sourdough
- Place of origin: Germany
- Main ingredients: Rye and wheat flour

Kommissbrot, formerly Kommißbrot (German: [kɔˈmɪsˌbʁoːt]), (German: commissary bread) is a dark type of German bread, baked from rye and other flours, historically used for military provisions.

== Description ==
Kommissbrot is a dark bread made from rye and wheat flours as a sourdough. It has a firm but not hard crust, and because it is normally baked in a loaf pan, it develops a crust only on the top. It is noted for its long shelf life.

== History ==
Since the 16th century, Kommiß has been used as a word for a military troop, and so Kommißbrot was used to mean the bread provided for the military, since Brot is the German word for bread, and it came to be used to denote the type of bread.

The nutritional value of kommissbrot was studied by Prausnitz in 1893 and by Wenceslaus Plagge and Georg Lebbin in 1897.

It was used as military provisions in World War I, when sawdust was sometimes added to compensate for shortages of flour, and in World War II. A study by M. Gerson in 1941 concluded that kommissbrot covered the daily requirements of vitamin B_{1}.

Following World War I, it became available in civilian bakeries, and the recipe was changed to produce a softer bread.

== In popular culture ==
In the 1920s, the Hanomag 2/10 PS compact car was given the nickname Kommissbrot because its shape resembled a loaf of that bread.

In the Austrian documentary film Cooking History directed by Peter Kerekes, kommissbrot is used as an illustration of the quantity of ingredients required to provide food for a large number of soldiers.

== See also ==
- Borodinsky bread
- K-brot
