= Nordic bread culture =

History of bread in Nordic countries

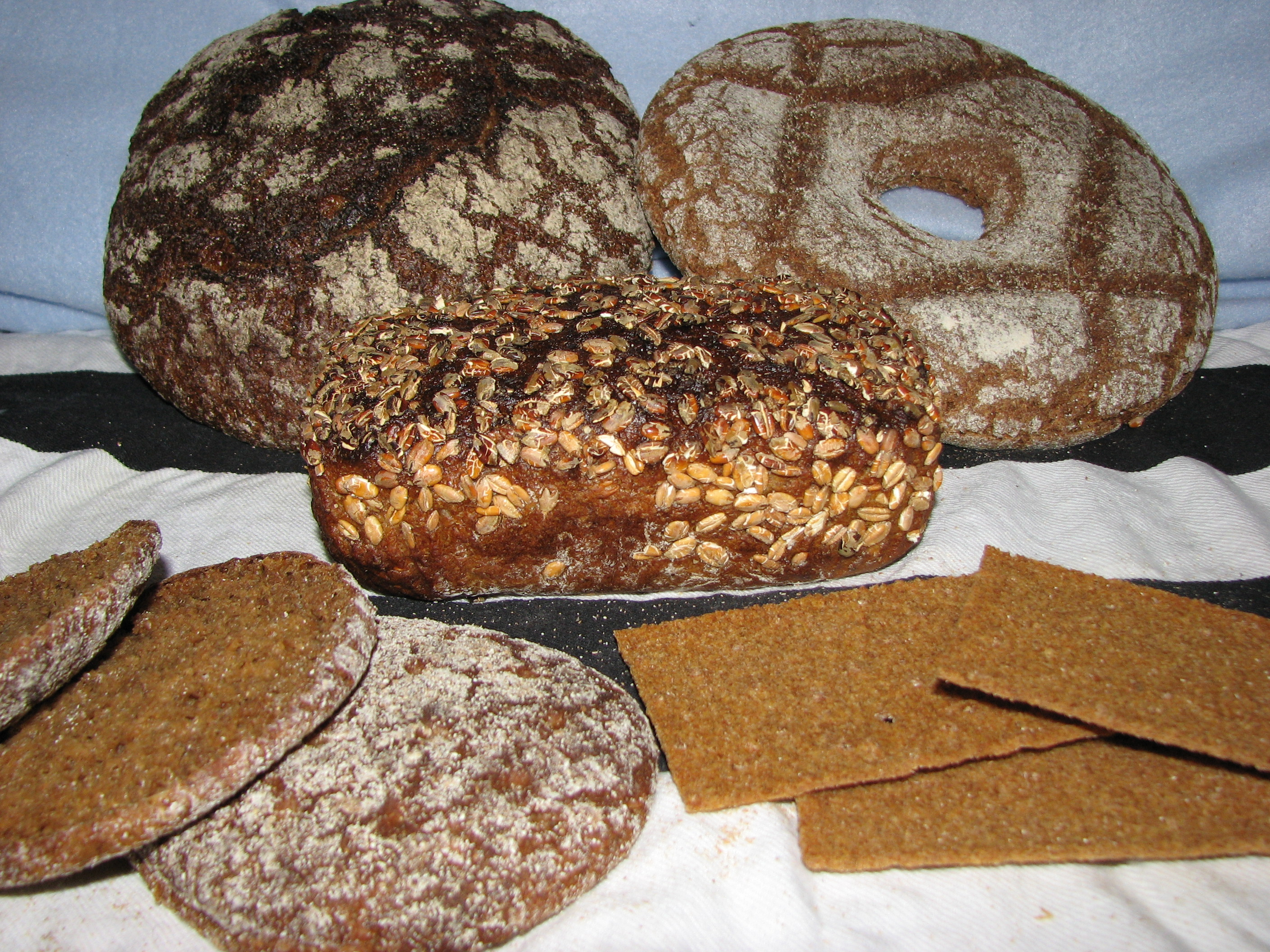
Assortment of different types of bread, including rye, flatbreads, crispbreads, and nut bread

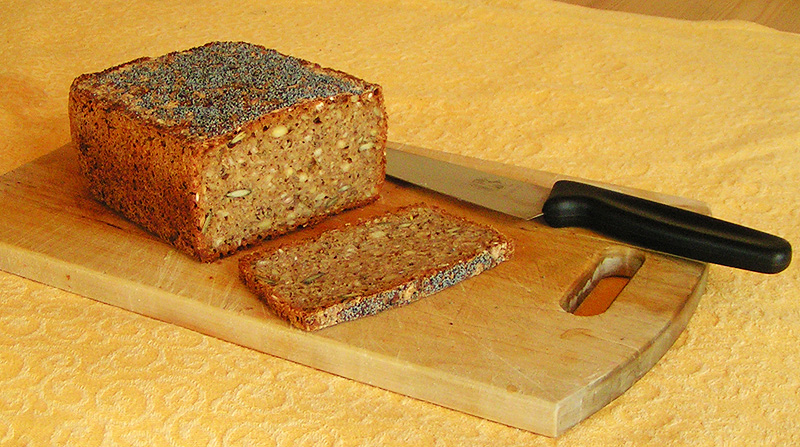
Danish rye bread made with whole grain, broken grain, and seeds

Nordic bread culture has existed in Denmark, Finland, Norway, and Sweden from prehistoric times through to the present. It is often characterized by the usage of rye flour, barley flour, a mixture of nuts, seeds, and herbs, and varying densities depending on the region. Often, bread is served as an accompaniment to various recipes and meals. Nordic breads are often seasoned with an assortment of different spices and additives, such as caraway seeds, orange zest, anise, and honey.

== Prehistoric times (until around 1000 AD) ==
Four grain types dominated in the Nordic countries: barley and rye are the oldest; wheat and oats are more recent. During the Iron Age (500 AD – 1050 AD), rye became the most commonly used grain, followed by barley and oats. Rye was also the most commonly used grain for bread up until the beginning of the 20th century. Today, older grain types, such as emmer and spelt, are once again being cultivated and new bread types are being developed from these grains.

Archaeological finds in Denmark indicate use of the two triticum (wheat) species, emmer and einkorn, during the Mesolithic Period (8900 BC – 3900 BC). There is no direct evidence of bread-making, but cereals have been crushed, cooked and served as porridge since at least 4200 BC. During the Neolithic Period (3900 BC – 1800 BC), when agriculture was introduced, barley seems to have taken over to some extent, and ceramic plates apparently used for baking are found. Moulded cereals, with water added to make a dough and baked or fried in the shape of bread, are known as burial gifts in Iron Age graves (200 AD onwards) in the Mälardalen area of central Sweden. However, it is not certain that this bread was eaten; it could just have been a burial gift. During the Bronze Age (1800 BC – 500 AD), oats and the triticum species spelt seem to have been the most commonly used grains, and the first real ovens appear, probably used for baking small loaves and perhaps the first bread (probably around 400 AD).

Scandinavian soldiers in Roman times apparently learned baking techniques when working as mercenaries in the Roman army (200–400 AD). They subsequently took the technique home with them to show that they had been employed in high status work on the continent. Early Christian traditions promoted an interest in bread. Culturally, German traditions have influenced most of the bread types in the Nordic countries. In the eastern part of Finland, there is a cultural link to Russia and Slavic bread traditions.

In the Nordic countries, bread was the main part of a meal until the late 18th century. Four different bread regions can be found in the Nordic area in the late 19th century. In the south, soft rye bread dominated. Further north came crisp bread, usually baked with rye, then thin and crispy barley bread. In the far north, soft barley loaves dominated. During the 19th century, potatoes began to become the centrepiece of meals and bread was put aside as an extra source of carbohydrates in a meal. Bread still retained its key function for breakfast, as the open sandwich is a starter for most Nordic people today and potatoes are used as a centrepiece in lunches and dinners.

A history of Nordic bread from around 1000 AD and some contemporary types and bread innovations is presented below. Countries are presented in alphabetic order (Denmark, Finland, Iceland, Norway and Sweden). The names of the bread types are mostly given in both the contemporary national language and in English.

== Denmark ==
=== History ===
Not much is known about the bread types used in Denmark up until the Middle Ages, but we believe that they were mostly unleavened and that the flour was a mixture of various types of grain, as a pure monoculture was probably not possible at the time. Rye bread was still baked at farms well into the 19th century, as most people lived in the countryside. The loaves were oblong in shape, made from ground whole rye, leavened with sour dough and sometimes sweetened with malt syrup. The loaves weighed up to 15–16 kg (33–35 lb). They were baked once a month, as heating the oven was both time-consuming and used a lot of firewood. The bakers in the towns baked their rye bread for the day.

We only know little about the other types of bread in the olden times. More refined bread types for special occasions and feasts were prepared from sifted rye flour, and loaves made from wheat must have been eaten. Around 1400, the emblem of the bakers’ guild became the triangular skonrogge (i.e. a small leavened rye bread that is cleaved and baked again until dry, also Danish: beskøjt, French: biscuit, Latin: bis-coctus: baked twice). Around 1600, the skonrogge was replaced as the baker's emblem by the pretzel-shaped kringle, which is still the emblem of the bakers’ guild today. We find the first systematic description of Danish bread in 1821 in Charles Adolph Dénys Mourier's book on bread and bread-making. He describes various leavened bread types: rugbrød (whole rye bread), franskbrød (white wheat bread), sigtebrød (sifted rye bread) and tvebakker (wheat biscuits), as well as unleavened bread types: fladbrød (wheat, rye, oats, bran in various combinations) and wafers.

=== Today ===
In the late 19th century, Danish bakers in the larger towns created the idea of freshly baked bread in the morning (morgenbrød) in various shapes and with a variety of seasonings, baked from wheat intended for the rising bourgeoisie. Since then, freshly baked bread has been produced in every Danish baker's shop together with all the other kinds of bread. This decentralised form of baking bread alongside the industrialised production of bread seems to be characteristic of the Danish bread sector. The quality of Danish bread declined in the latter part of the 20th century, but it has dramatically recovered during the past 20 years due to many factors: a growing interest in bread, criticism from gastronomes, the marketing of better quality flour, better baking entrepreneurship, top restaurants baking their own bread and, last but not least, inspiration from immigrants. Consumption has to a great extent switched from rye bread to wheat bread.

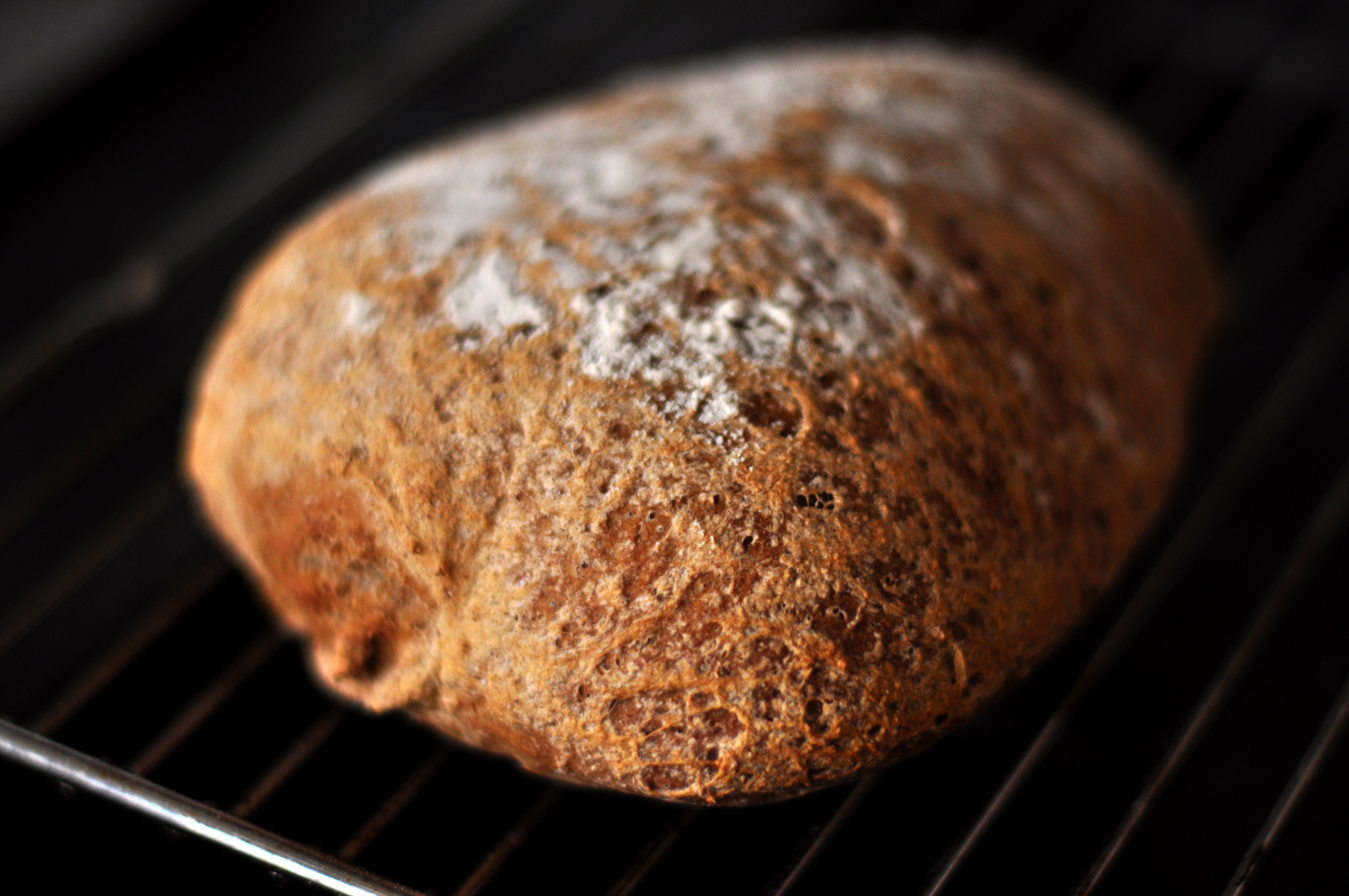
Ølandshvedebrød

New types of flour have played a pivotal role in the improvements in Danish bread. Aurion, a Danish organic company, has spearheaded these improvements by obtaining interesting types of grain from many sources, e.g. the Nordic Gene Bank and a few grain types found in an old farmhouse. This strategy has resulted in the marketing of organic flour made from emmer, einkorn, spelt, kamut, ølandshvede, durum and svedjerug.

The baker's traditional monopoly in delivering fresh baked bread has been challenged by petrol station outlets selling good quality bake-off bread.

== Finland ==
=== History ===
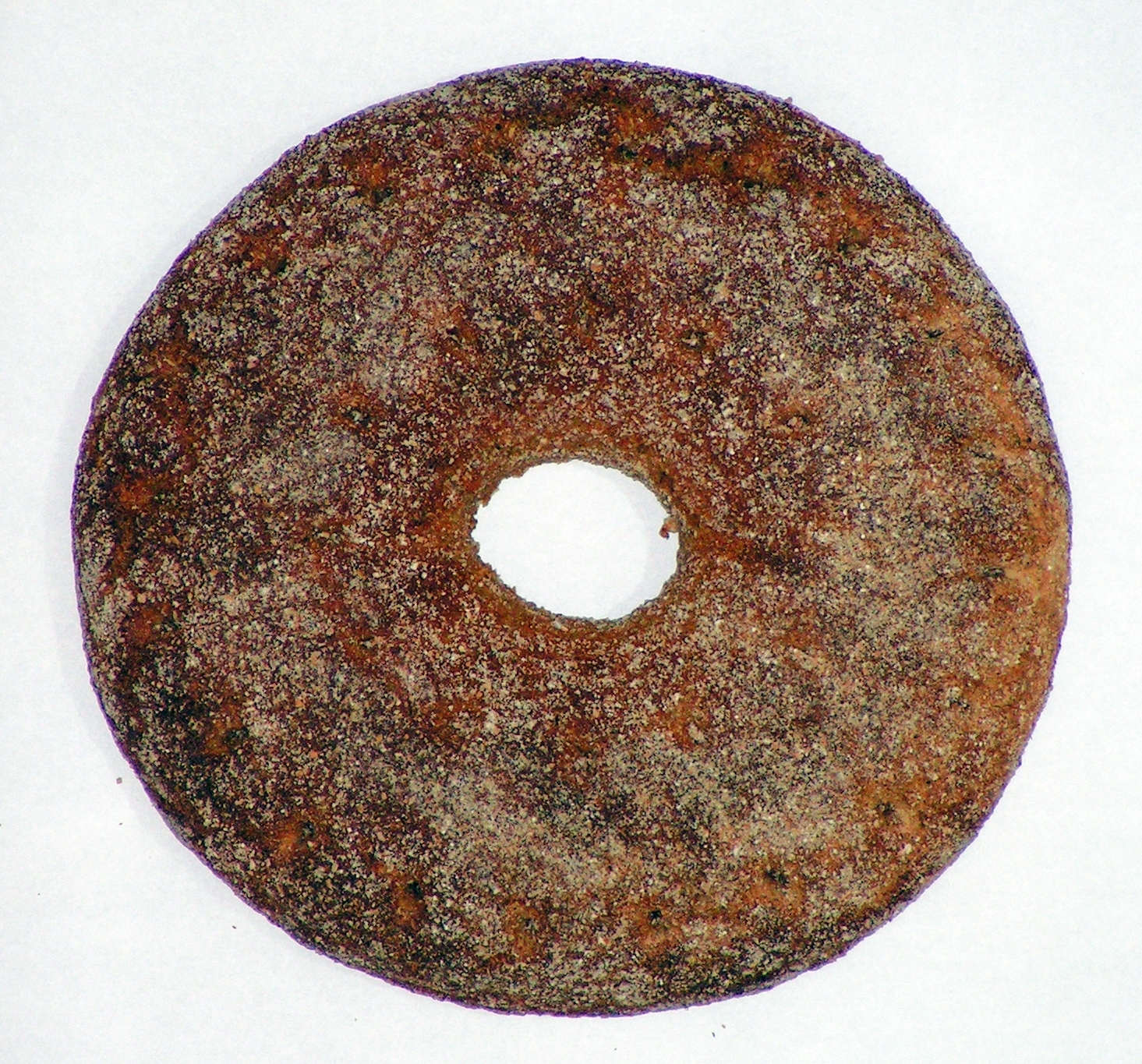
Ruisreikäleipä

Centuries ago, bread was an important part of the daily meal; for the poorest households, it was the only meal of the day.

Cultivated varieties were barley, which is the oldest cultivated grain, followed by rye and oat; all used for porridge and baking. When grain was scarce, people used many different types of tree bark such as birch and pine as a substitute to make bark bread. Around the 10th century, wheat became a more commonly used cultivated grain, but it did not overtake rye or oats. In the Early Middle Ages, the most commonly used cultivation technique was three-shift cultivation. This type of cultivation method involved using one third of the field for autumn grain (especially rye), one third for spring grain and the rest for fallow. This approach enabled good harvests and provided good pasture for cattle. The method also guaranteed crucial grain supplies for bread flour.

Finland's cultural position between East and West has also left its mark on bread-making. Western Finland was influenced by baking and cultivation techniques from Scandinavia, whereas eastern Finland was exposed to Russian influences.

In North Karelia, in eastern Finland, households baked their bread in large ovens several times a week and the bread was eaten fresh. Bread was made from rye and dough heart (sourdough starter) could be hundreds of years’ old, bread raised without added yeast.

In western Finland, it was not as common for bread to be baked weekly. Baking happened probably once or twice a month using barley and oats. Added yeast was used in the dough. Before baking, a small hole was made in the corner of the round, flattened bread, and after baking the bread was hung on poles suspended just below the kitchen ceiling to dry and for storage: see ruisreikäleipä. Barley, and sometimes wheat, was used in the western part of Finland. The most frequently cultivated grain was rye, followed by barley.

Bread culture in central Finland was influenced by both the East and the West. Bread was also influenced to some extent by Lapland; bread was called rieska, but it was much thicker than Laplandic rieska. Lapland was strongly influenced by both Swedish Lapland and Norway.

The most varied bread traditions in Finland are to be found in the regions of Karelia and Kainuu, where cereals have been ingeniously combined with other natural products such as berries, fish and vegetables. Rice is a traditional filling in the Karelian pastry and the latest research show that this influence has a Russian origin, where rice was used in pastries as early as the 17th century.

=== Today ===
In the 19th century, bread-making in the cities moved to local bakeries. Poor households baked their own bread daily in small apartments. The bread consisted of thinner, multigrain breads, elongated sekaleipä mixed-cereal bread. Bread was made from all four of the cereals grown in Finland: wheat, rye, barley and oats, usually ground into various grades. Rye bread can be either light or dark in colour, depending on the type of flour mixture used, and it is typical for rye bread to include about 20% wheat flour. New trends and old traditions are bringing old-fashioned rye breads back to the shelves in shops. These rye breads are made entirely from rye flour and are the most common breads in the Finnish diet. Other types of sour bread are still baked in the residual heat of ovens and the longer baking time at low temperature gives the bread both a darker colour and a higher density and hardness than ordinary rye bread. A few wheat breads are still made in Finland, although most are simple buns or loaves of sliced or unsliced bread. Vesirinkeli, water rings, are small, almost tasteless rings of yeast-leavened wheat bread, which resemble bagels. They are cooked in salted boiling water before being baked. Oats are the most commonly produced grain in Finland and many oat bread types are available, although they are not as popular as rye breads. The most common bread types in Finland are bread rolls or buns, sämpylä or flat soft bread pieces.

The potato, although a late introduction to Finland in the early 19th century, features heavily in food culture and has found its way into many kinds of bread. Dough made with potato is usually very soft and the bread will be moister and fluffier than plain wheat or oat bread. This bread is widely used, particularly in northern Finland and Lapland.

In Tampere, central Finland, a large bakery invented Ruisnappi, a rye snack flavoured with chilli, lemon, onion and garlic. The innovation originated from the idea of using the bread taken from the holes which were removed from traditional round crispbreads, which was considered waste.

Finland has its own favorite yoghurt—rye-hazelnut. This product was developed from Finnish rye bread crumbs and yoghurt.

See also fi:Leipä, Breads of Finland

== Iceland ==
=== History ===
With the settlement of the country (around 800–900 AD), grain (barley) was brought to Iceland, cultivated and used for bread and porridge. In Medieval times, wheat was to some extent imported. However, it was mostly used for bread for chiefs and for oblates. Grain cultivation is thought to have been abandoned before 1600 due to harsher climatic conditions, and subsequently most grains such as barley and rye were imported. Until the late 19th century, wheat was mostly bought by richer people. In the 17th century, rye and barley were the most common grains, with rye becoming more prominent in the 18th and 19th centuries.

The issue of a lack of grain was overcome in different ways in different parts of the country. In some areas, grain was made to go further using dulse (Palmaria palmata; Icelandic: söl), Iceland moss (Cetraria islandica; Icelandic: fjallagrös) or Irish moss (Chondrus crispus; Icelandic: fjörugrös) in compotes and breads, or by flattening the dough so thin that the bread became almost transparent. In the southeast region (Skaftafellssýslur), locals knew how to use the lyme grass (Leymus arenarius) (Icelandic: melkorn; sometimes called the Icelandic grain) for centuries, where it was used in compotes, bread, pancakes, etc. These grain substitutes gave the bread a distinctive character. Dulse breads and biscuits can be made by mixing dulse, rye, and Icelandic moss in equal proportions.

Only in the last few decades has grain (barley) been cultivated. It is still cultivated on a very small scale, mostly for feed. Other grains, such as varieties of rye and wheat, have been cultivated, although this is still very much at an experimental stage.

It was not until the 18th century that it became common practice to make leavened rye breads. Sour dough was mostly used (older rye dough which had started to ferment). These breads were called pottbrauð (pot breads) because they were baked (or rather steamed) on a stove under a pot (upside down)—i.e. a kind of oven. Around 1900, it was common to bake these breads in sealed containers (i.e. from imported sweets, today often from milk cartons). When ovens became a household item, the containers were placed in them. Where thermal springs were available nearby, they were (and still are) used to bake these dark, moist and rather sweet breads (taking up to 24 hours). Rye breads baked in hot springs are a popular item today, being served for local consumption as well as for tourists.

In general, stock fish (Icelandic: harðfiskur) was served as a bread substitute, eaten with butter on the side with almost every meal. Today, stock fish has lost its role as a bread substitute. It is however still eaten in the same way, either with or without butter. It is a popular snack, which has found a new target group within the sports food sector due to its high protein content and favourable amino acid content.

There have always been some imported breads in Iceland (as indicated by reports from the 14th century). However, these breads were mostly consumed by chiefs and richer people until the 20th century. Foreign sailors often paid for services on land with different kinds of bread (double-baked bread, cookies, skonrogge, etc.).

=== Today ===
Most types of breads available in other Western countries are now also available in Iceland, either baked in Iceland or imported. Everyday bread is mostly made by industrial bakeries or bought at the local bakery. However, baking at home is still a common practice amongst young and older households alike, especially in connection with having guests and celebrations. Both traditional recipes and modern recipes are popular, with new methods replacing older ones to some extent. Of the bread types currently available, flatbrauð (flatbread) and laufabrauð (leaf bread) have the longest traditions.

Flatbrauð came in various sizes and thicknesses and was made from rye-flour and hot water. Sometimes wheat was added as well. The bread was kneaded and flattened into a round form by a cake roller or by hand, picked and baked on a hot stove or in ashes. Before the Second World War, flatbrauð was only served with a meal. However, since then it has become a popular feature on the coffee table. Today, flatbrauð with hangikjöt (smoked, cooked lamb, in thin slices) is often served, both in restaurants and at home.

Several types of fried bread can be categorised as traditional: laufabrauð (leaf bread), kleinur (bows), lummur (small pancakes), and pönnukökur (crêpes). With the exception of laufabrauð, none of these is mentioned in written records until the late 18th century. Laufabrauð is sometimes called “snowflake bread” in English because of its intricate cut-out pattern. Through the centuries, it was probably only served to chiefs, made from wheat and sugar and fried with butter. By the 19th century, it had become a festival bread for public consumption. At the time, it was made from cheaper ingredients, barley and rye meal, and fried in sheep fat (tólg). In the late 19th century, laufabrauð was a festival bread in the north and northeast, mostly at Christmas. Since then, the tradition has spread across the whole country. Making this crispy bread is still a popular family event today and for many an essential part of the Christmas preparations. Dozens of family members or friends will often spend an entire December afternoon kneading, rolling, decorating and frying the bread, which is then kept until Christmas Eve or Christmas Day, when it is eaten with smoked lamb.

Students from the Icelandic Academy of Arts developed a local fast food in cooperation with farmers around lake Mývatn (Midge lake). Called Mýbiti ("midge bite") It is a sandwich made from rye bread that is baked in the hot springs nearby and shaped to resemble a unique green algae, lakeball (Icelandic: kúluskítur; Aegagropila linnaei), which is found in the lake (this algae is only found in a few lakes in the world). The sandwich is then filled with local ingredients, such as smoked Arctic char.

Café Loki in Reykjavík is an example of a café/restaurant that is experimenting with new applications of rye bread. One of its recent products is an ice cream spiced with roasted and ground rye bread (similar to krokant).

== Norway ==
=== History ===
Since the early history of Norway, two types of bread have been mentioned: the white wheat loaves in the homes of noblemen and the heavy loaves of coarse bread in the thrall’s cabin. Barley is the oldest grain and dominated in the mountainous northern parts of the region, while oats were most common in humid areas. Because of the cold climate, rye and wheat were cultivated only in southern Norway, and importing was necessary. Wheat products were very exclusive and primarily enjoyed by the elite on festive occasions. Wheat was also used in the holy bread in churches.

The coarse loaves were simply made from flour or crushed grain that was kneaded with hot water or some other liquid and shaped into a flat cake of dough. These cakes were placed on a flat stone beside the fire, in the ashes or on the embers of the fire. They were used as a bread plate with fish, meats and vegetables. These breads were mainly baked from barley and oats and had in common the fact that they could not be kept for more than a few days. They needed to be preserved. This led to the development of very thin, dry and crispy flatbreads (flatbrød) that could be stored for many years.

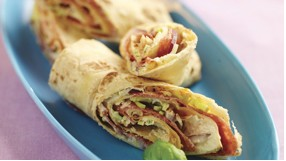
Lefserull or wrap

For festive occasions, especially Christmas, the Norwegians have a long tradition of making various kinds of very thin flatbread called lefser, tunnbrød, kling, klining or krotekake. Both men and women participate in baking these traditional breads; one rolls the dough and the other fries on wide, flat pans (takke). Lefser can contain fine wheat, fine barley and perhaps potatoes, milk and eggs. After frying, they can be served with meat, sausages or fish. Today, they are used for making wraps with various fillings.

In olden days, grain was ground on manually operated rotary querns. However, during the Middle Ages, millstones powered by a waterwheel were introduced, and large amounts of grain could be ground more quickly. These mills depended on a good flow of water, which mainly occurred during the autumn and spring. These two seasons were the time for baking flatbread and lefser. Once rye began to be cultivated around 1500, baking techniques changed to leaven breads in ovens, e.g. with sour dough and later with other leavens. The rye in oven-baked bread was often mixed with barley for economy. It was only baked once a month, or more often during the summer. During storage, these breads gradually became drier and drier, even if they were carefully wrapped in cloth or placed in grain bins. However, dry bread was also more economical and eating fresh bread was considered a luxury. A high intake of whole grain bread has been typical of Norwegian bread eating habits for both breakfast and lunch.

A special preparation was used to make leavened oven baked bread longer-lasting. This was particularly necessary for ships’ crews on long voyages. This consisted of wholegrain balls cut in two and dried in an oven until dry and crispy. Such bread is called kavring or tvebak, meaning ‘baked twice’, and can be stored for a long time.

=== Today ===
A research report from 2008 shows that eight out of ten respondents reported eating bread for breakfast and lunch regularly. However, few of them reported eating bread for their evening meal. The report also shows that bread and bread meals have a high food cultural value in Norway. Six out of ten considered taking a packed lunch (matpakke) to work or school a good habit and something that they enjoyed.

Many new types of bread have reached the market in recent years. A high percentage of people reported eating bread types such as spelt, specialty, gourmet, and fibre/bran bread, as well as ciabattas and baguettes, regularly, although very few reported doing so on a daily basis. Norwegian bakers now have competition from abroad. The whole grain bread from local bakers must give way to huge vehicle loads of baguettes and frozen dough offering cheaper products.

In 2007, the information office for bread and cereals (Opplysningskontoret for brød og korn) was founded. Their slogan is “Bread for every meal”. Their aim is to increase the consumption of bread and cereals. They have created websites for nutrition, facts, recipes, school and press. Last year, they held a competition for pupils to make the best school bread.

== Sweden ==
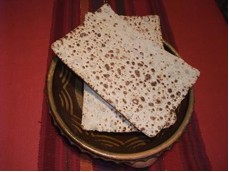
Thin bread or flatbread in a contemporary square shape.

=== History ===
Since the very beginning, bread-making has always been a male task and associated with high status in Sweden. These first breads were baked using barley flour, or perhaps wheat for thin or flat bread cakes (tunnbröd). Bread became an important item in the new Christian religion (AD 900) for celebrating Holy Communion (bread and wine), which emphasised bread as being both new and important.

Thin bread was baked on stones or iron plates or in a large oven, and this tradition is still in existence today.

In medieval times (1100–1200 AD) in central and southern Sweden, rye flour was baked into soft loaves or, in the central regions, into crispbread (knäckebröd, “bread which can be broken”). The crispbread was baked with a hole in the middle so that it could be threaded over a beam and stored suspended from the ceiling. From Medieval times and the introduction of the first simple watermills, these flatbreads and crispbreads were baked only once or twice a year and kept dry in a storage chamber.

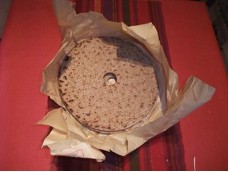
Contemporary knäckebröd with its traditional hole.

Rye flour was sometimes mixed with pea flour or, in times of famine, bark. From the 18th century, it was mixed with grated potatoes to make it last longer. Oatmeal was used in southwestern Sweden to bake thin breads or flatbreads. Sour dough was used as yeast, along with yeast from beer production (from the 19th century). Around 1860–70, industrial pressed yeast production started to result in more voluminous bread.

In southern Sweden, rye bread was more often baked into softer and thick bread cakes (kavring, “round bread”), and from the 19th century flavoured with syrup or molasses. Professional male bakers started to sell bread in the cities during the 13th century. However, in the countryside, everyday bread was baked at home by the women. Swedish recipe books dating from the 17th–18th century contain recipes of cakes, but not everyday bread, indicating that cakes were baked less often and amongst the higher echelons of society. The process of how to make everyday bread was kept among women as tacit knowledge.

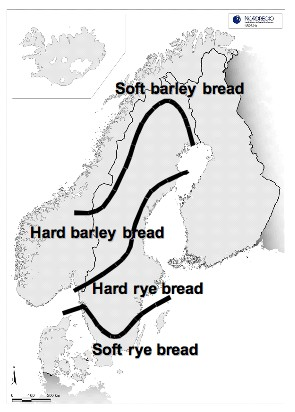
Bread types in Sweden around the 1880s. Note – the boundaries between the regions fluctuated.

A minority group in northern Sweden in the valley of the Torne river, known as the Tornedalians, baked a soft bread called rieska (unleavened bread). Quite unlike other types of bread in the surrounding northern region, rieska is a type of bread that does not keep, which is why it is baked daily or weekly. The Sàmi people also bake soft bread on stones on a daily basis. The large Finnish minority group in Sweden eats a stiffer rye bread baked with sour dough.

Bread was historically primarily served in one of two ways, either broken into pieces in a soup, stock, milk, or fermented milk, or dipped in a hot drink, or served in the form of butter spread on a slice of bread and served as an open sandwich. In regions where they lacked cereals or bread, dried fish has functioned as bread. In order to make it edible, the fish was first beaten with a stone until it became soft. The fish was spread with butter and eaten like a sandwich. Potato came to replace bread as a staple food during the 19th century and bread retained its position as the main component of breakfast, but it became a side-dish to hot luncheons and dinners when potato took over the former central role of bread.

The figure to the right shows the bread regions that existed around 1880, according to Åke Campbell (1950), before industrialisation led to all types of bread becoming available nationwide. Throughout history, the cities have always had a wider variety of bread types, as well as more expensive and higher status bread products in the form of cakes baked with sugar, butter and oriental spices. The boundaries should not be interpreted as being definitive, as cultural ideals always tend to vary along a boundary.

=== Today ===
During the switch to a modern urban and industrialised society, bread types changed when large industrial bakeries introduced new soft bread, which from the early 1920s was often sweetened (sötlimpa, sweet thick bread). From then on, bread was bought from stores and bakeries, rather than baked at home, as had previously been the case. Regional variations decreased due to the transportation and marketing of bread as a national product. The consumption of bread products of various kinds has increased since the 1990s and wholegrain bread and wheat bread are the most popular. All older bread types still exist alongside the new ones, indicating the much greater variety open to individuals today than has been the case in the past. Soft bread consumption has increased by more than 60% since the 1990s, from 30 to 50 kg (66 to 110 lb) per person per year today (2007). The older types of bread are still eaten in Sweden, but today they are usually professionally baked. New international types such as naan bread, ciabatta, focaccia, pita and bagels have been popular since the 1990s. 20% of Swedes are first- or second-generation immigrants and use bread both as they did in their home countries and as it is used today in contemporary Swedish normative food culture.

In Grythyttan in central Sweden, the local ice cream and chocolate shop invented a new ice cream. They have taken an ordinary white vanilla ice cream and flavoured it with dry crispbread of rye (knäckebröd). Small pieces of the bread are also added to the ice cream, giving it the texture of both smooth ice cream and hard and sometimes soggy bits of crispbread. The ice cream is very popular among young people.

== Similarities and diversities in Nordic breads ==
Nordic food culture in the south and east of the region comprises a tradition of baking softer rye breads. In Denmark and especially in Sweden, the soft rye bread is sweeter; in Finland, a drier sour rye bread type is traditional. Iceland has for the past hundred years imported grain to make bread, as grain is not cultivated on the island. Due to the lack of grain, local ingredients such as dulse or Iceland moss were sometimes used to partly replace the grain. Soft sweet rye bread has also been baked for centuries in Iceland (i.e. the rye bread baked in hot springs)—the difference is that the rye has been imported from the other Nordic countries. People in the northern regions of Norway, Sweden and Finland have a tradition of baking thin flat, crispy breads using barley. Since Medieval times, bread was only baked once or twice a year and stored in dry chambers. In central Sweden and central Finland, there is a belt where a tradition of baking thin rye bread has developed. A paradox is that amongst people in the northern sub-alpine regions of Norway, Sweden and Finland and amongst the Sámi people, bread has been baked on a weekly basis and eaten as soft bread cakes. In all Nordic countries, dried fish has been used as a bread substitute, being served buttered. Today, international bread types are mixed with the old ones, and bread is used both in food innovations such as yoghurt with bread and fast food bread and in new meal settings.
