= Hapanlohko =

Karelian dish

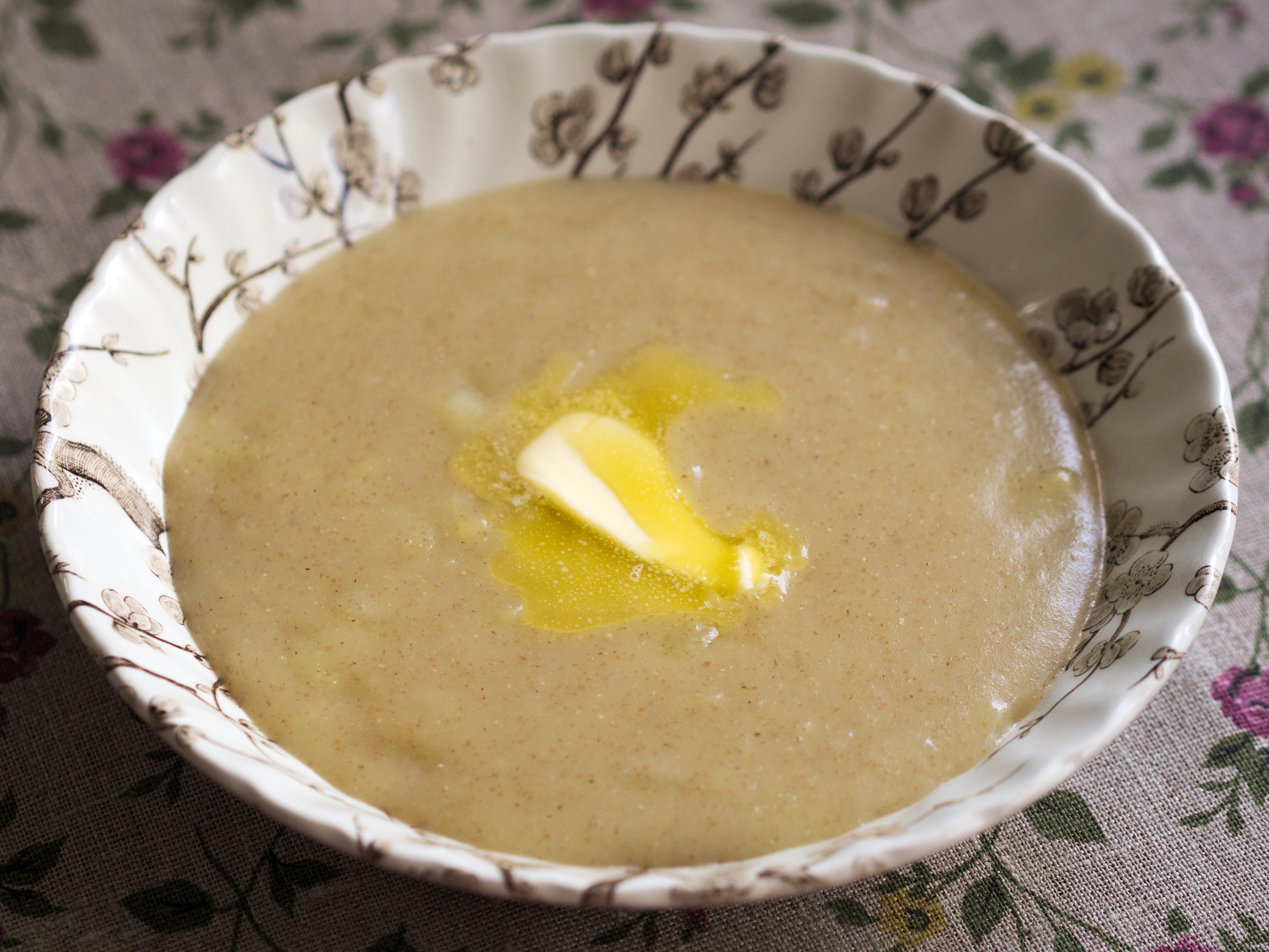
- Place of origin: Karelia
- Main ingredients: Potato and rye bread dough

Hapanlohko is a traditional Karelian dish, made out of potato and rye bread dough. The dough is stored in a wooden sourdough pot before being baked into bread. However, some dough is removed first to make hapanlohko. The dough is boiled in a pot with peeled potatoes, thus completing the recipe.
