= Finnish bread =

Bread of Finland

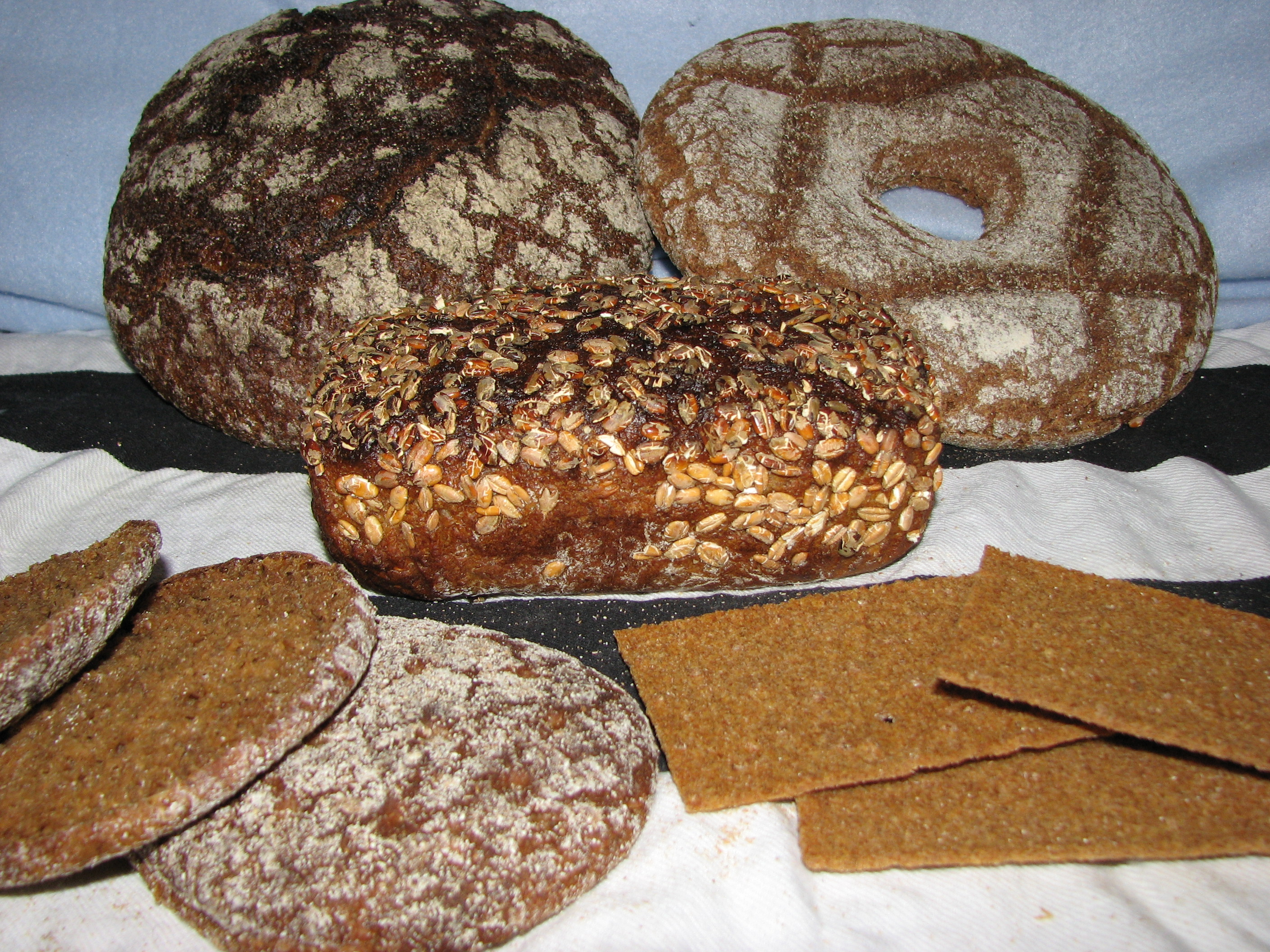
- Five types of Finnish rye bread (top to bottom/left to right): limppu, reikäleipä, a loaf, commercial pre-halved rye bread, and hapankorppu
- Type: Bread
- Place of origin: Finland

Bread is a staple food of Finland. It is served with almost every meal and many different types are produced domestically.

In the Swedish-speaking region of Åland, there are other varieties of bread, the majority of which owe much to Swedish cuisine.

== Rye bread ==
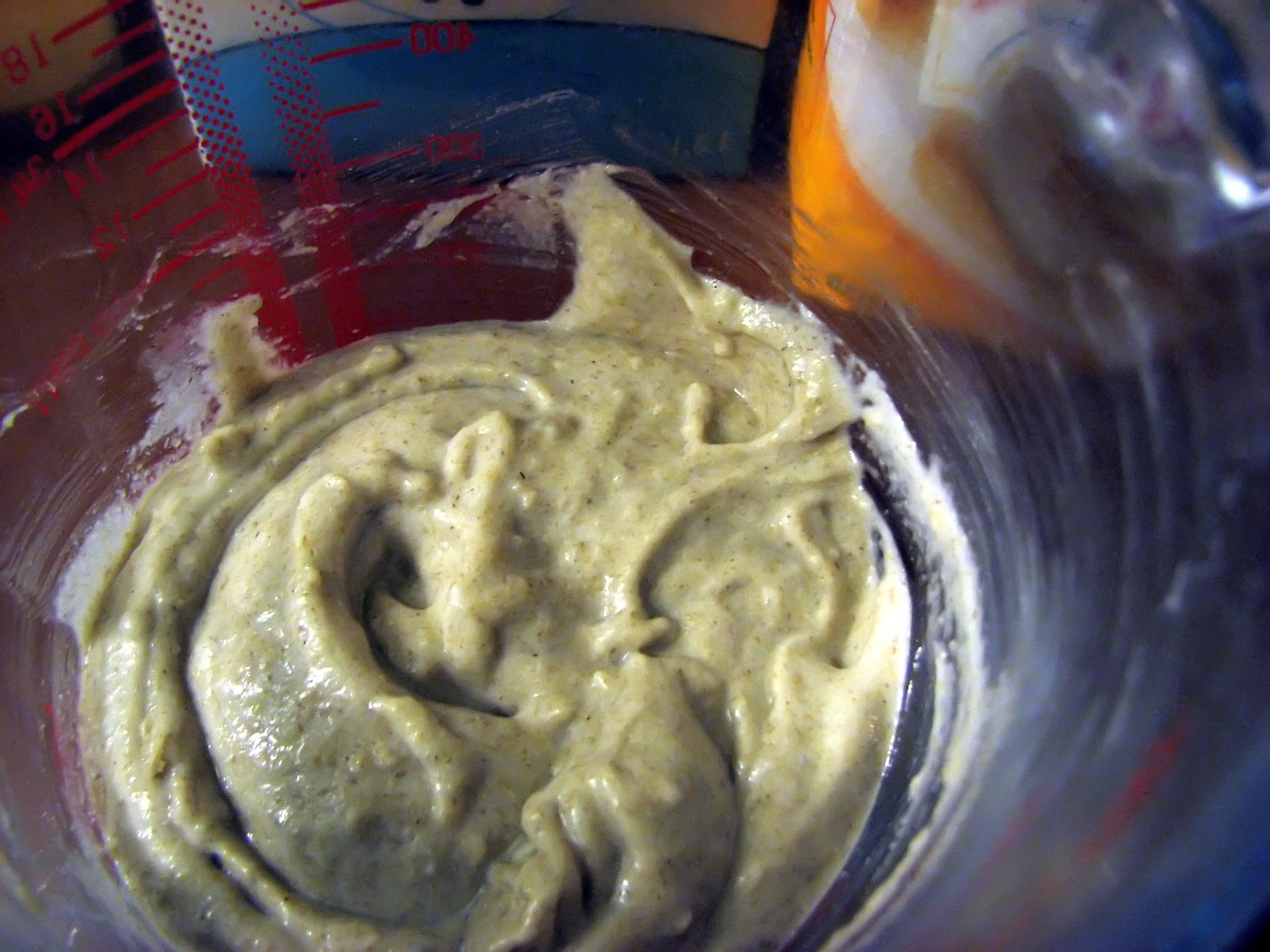
Sourdough starter mix, the base of most Finnish rye bread

Rye bread, known as ruisleipä, is a popular dark and sour bread in Finland, distinguishing itself from German rye breads by its less greasy and moist texture and differs from Swedish rye breads by not being sweet and lacking spices like caraway. Traditional Finnish rye breads, such as reikäleipä and limppu, were historically dried on poles beneath kitchen ceilings. They have become a national symbol, celebrated on February 28 as "rye bread day."

=== Limppu ===
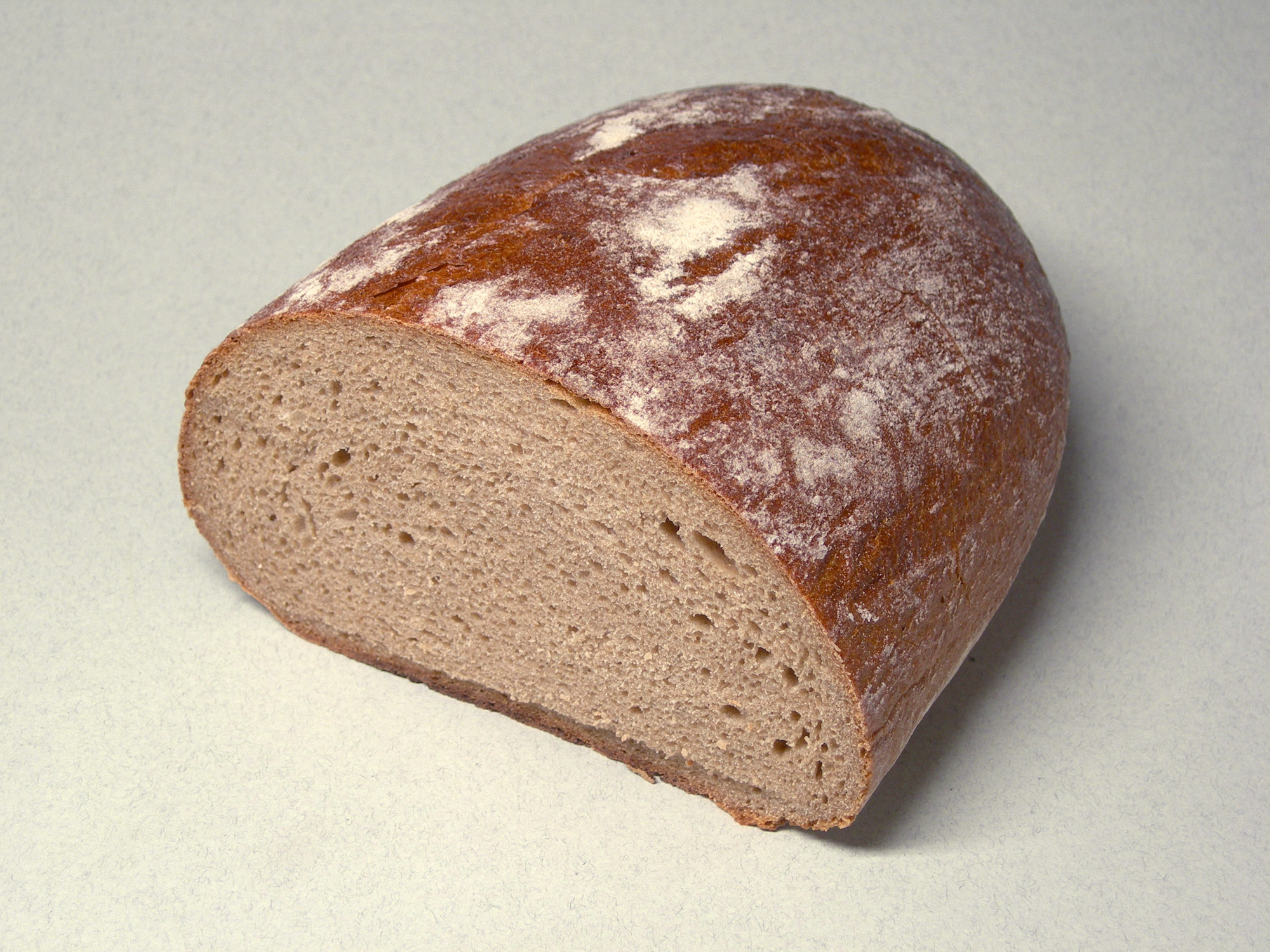
Limppu

Traditional Eastern Finnish rye bread is called limppu. The closest translation to English would be "loaf" (although limppu is always round and bulbous, while rectangular loaves are available). This bread is dark, sour in taste, dense, heavy and comparatively dry. Its mouthfeel still remains soft enough to be bitten off easily, and leavening is easily discernible by eye. This kind of bread was usually produced at steady intervals throughout the year, whereas Western Finnish tradition stressed less frequent baking sessions combined with long-term storage.

Limppu is common in the Upper Peninsula of Michigan due to high levels of Finnish immigration and may be found in many pubs and diners across the peninsula.

=== Reikäleipä ===
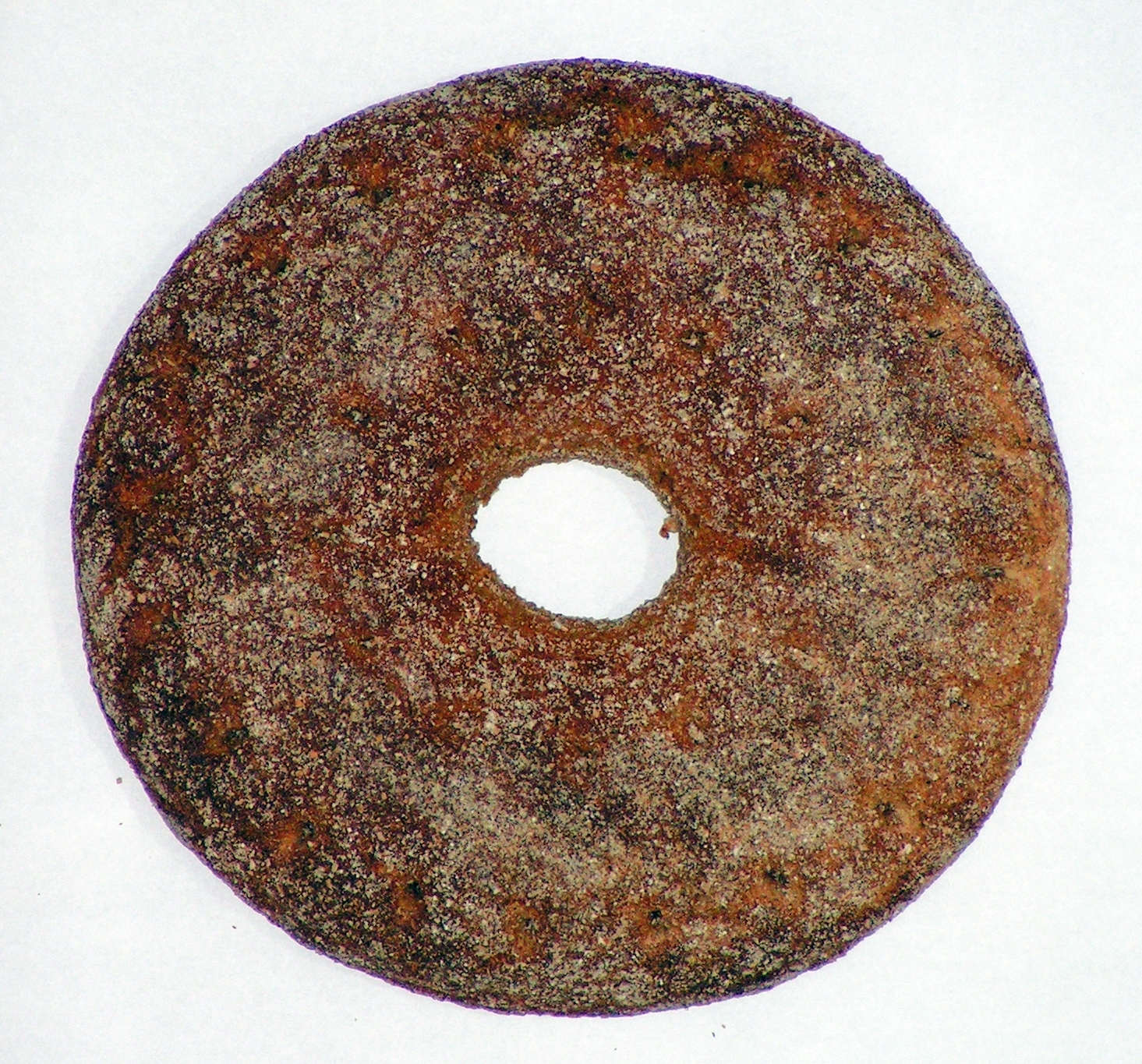
Reikäleipä

Reikäleipä (lit. 'hole bread'), a traditional Western Finnish rye bread, is dried near the kitchen ceiling and preserved over the long winter. Nowadays reikäleipä is available in many forms and stages of aging throughout all of Finland, regardless of season.

=== Jälkiuunileipä ===
In western Finland, people used to bake a lot of bread at a time, but rarely. In the east, they used to bake less, but at least weekly. The old tradition was that all bread in the house for the year was baked over a few days, in a large oven that took a long time to cool. Jälkiuunileipä (lit. 'after-oven bread') could still be baked in the residual heat. The longer baking time in the lower temperature gives it a darker color, higher density and hardness than regular rye bread, comparable to a fruit cake. In addition to the traditional reikäleipä shape, there are also rectangular variations available.

=== Crispbread ===
Crispbread (näkkileipä) is leavened rye bread that is dried into a thin crisp. They are sometimes made using sourdough. Crispbread is very common throughout the Nordic countries and if stored properly will not spoil for a long time. A variant of crispbread is a thin sour rectangular crisp called hapankorppu. Rectangular crispbread is often associated with schools and other institutions, for example the Koulunäkki and Kunto brands.

== Wheat bread ==
Because traditionally wheat was not as abundant as rye or barley, wheat is mainly used for baking of pastry, scones, and pulla. Nowadays it is often combined with other types of flour to make Karelian pasties, meat pies, and other dishes.

=== Vesirinkeli ===
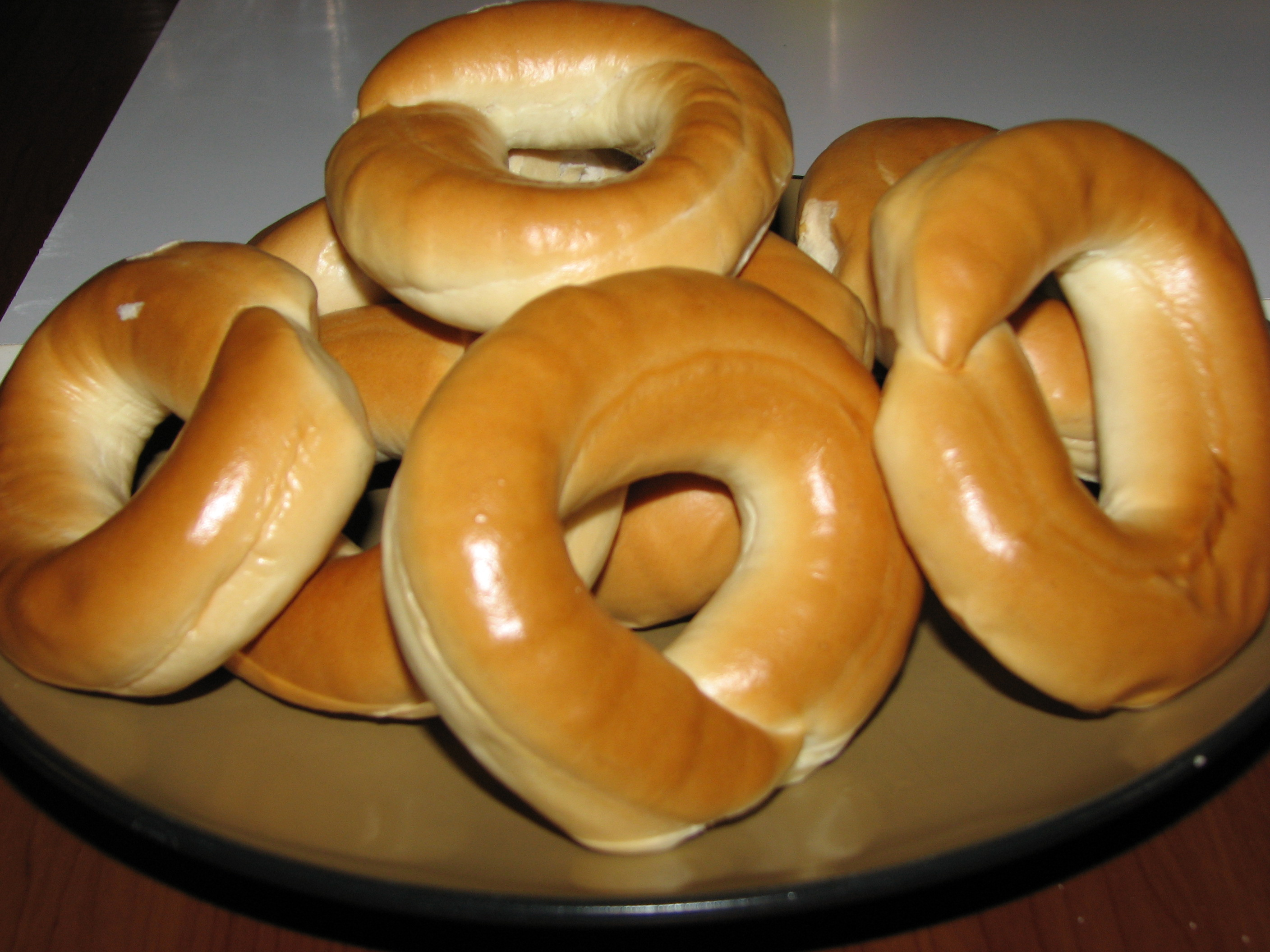
Vesirinkeli

Vesirinkeli (lit. 'water ring') is a small ring of yeast leavened wheat bread which resembles a bagel. They are available in several different varieties.

== Other breads ==
=== Oat bread ===
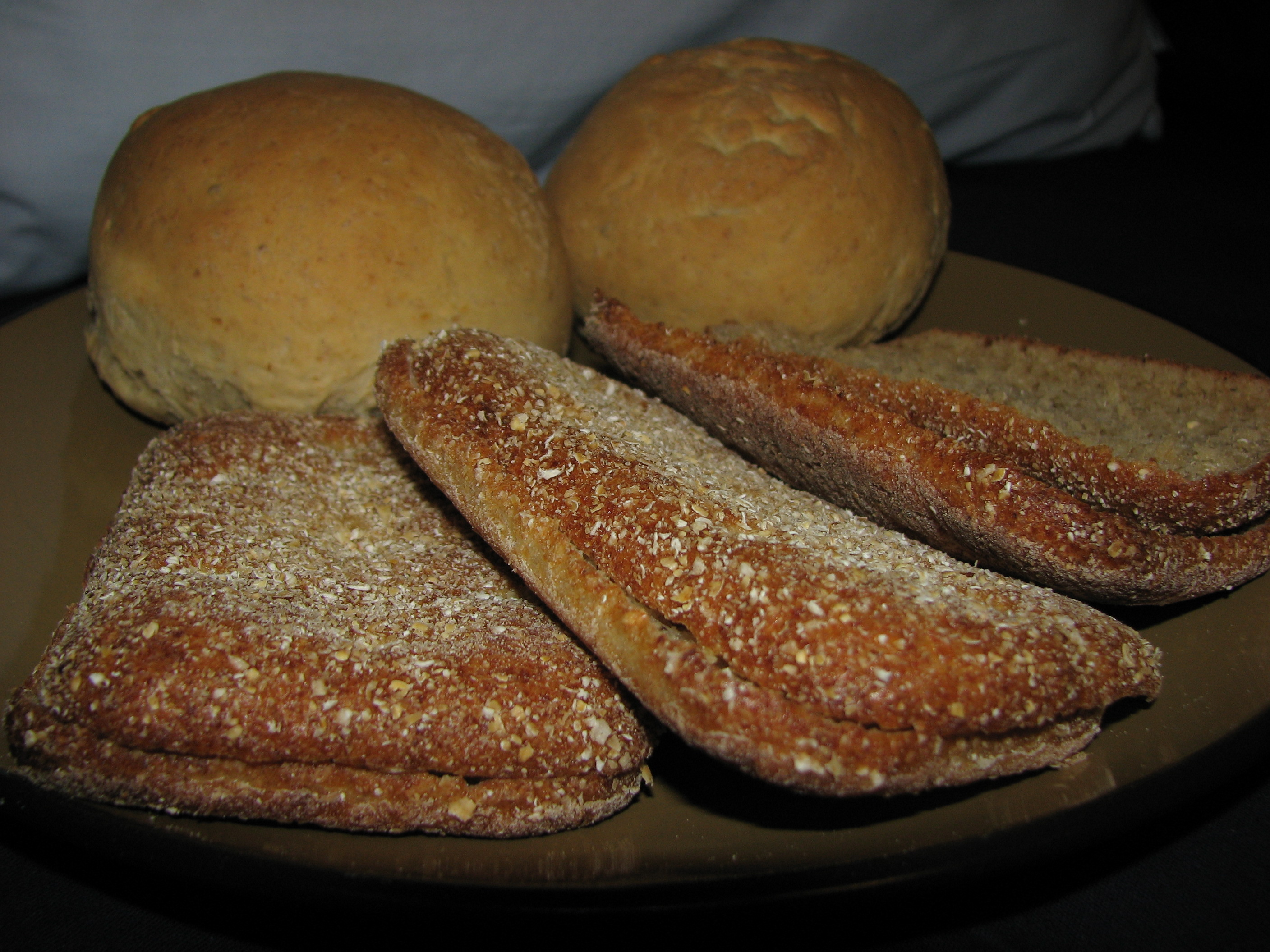
Oat rolls and Kaurapala brand bread

In 2019, Finland produced 1.19 million tonnes of oats (kaura). They are the most commonly produced grain in Finland and bread based on oats is popular, although not as popular as rye breads. The most common use of oats in bread is in rolls, sometimes flat and pre-cut into two halves.

=== Potato bread ===
The potato, although a late introduction to Finland, features heavily in the diet and has found its way into many kinds of breads. Usually dough made with potato will be very soft and the bread will be moister and fluffier than plain wheat or oat bread.

=== Christmas bread ===
There are several varieties of Christmas breads. Most are made in a similar way to a basic limppu, however they typically include molasses and other Christmas time flavours like orange, cinnamon, fennel, aniseed and caraway.

=== Korppu ===
Korppu is a dried, hard and crisp rusk that resembles a small halved bread roll. The sweet versions are often sprinkled with cinnamon and sugar. There are also variations of korppu which are totally flat and unleavened, usually made of rye or oats.

=== Rieska ===
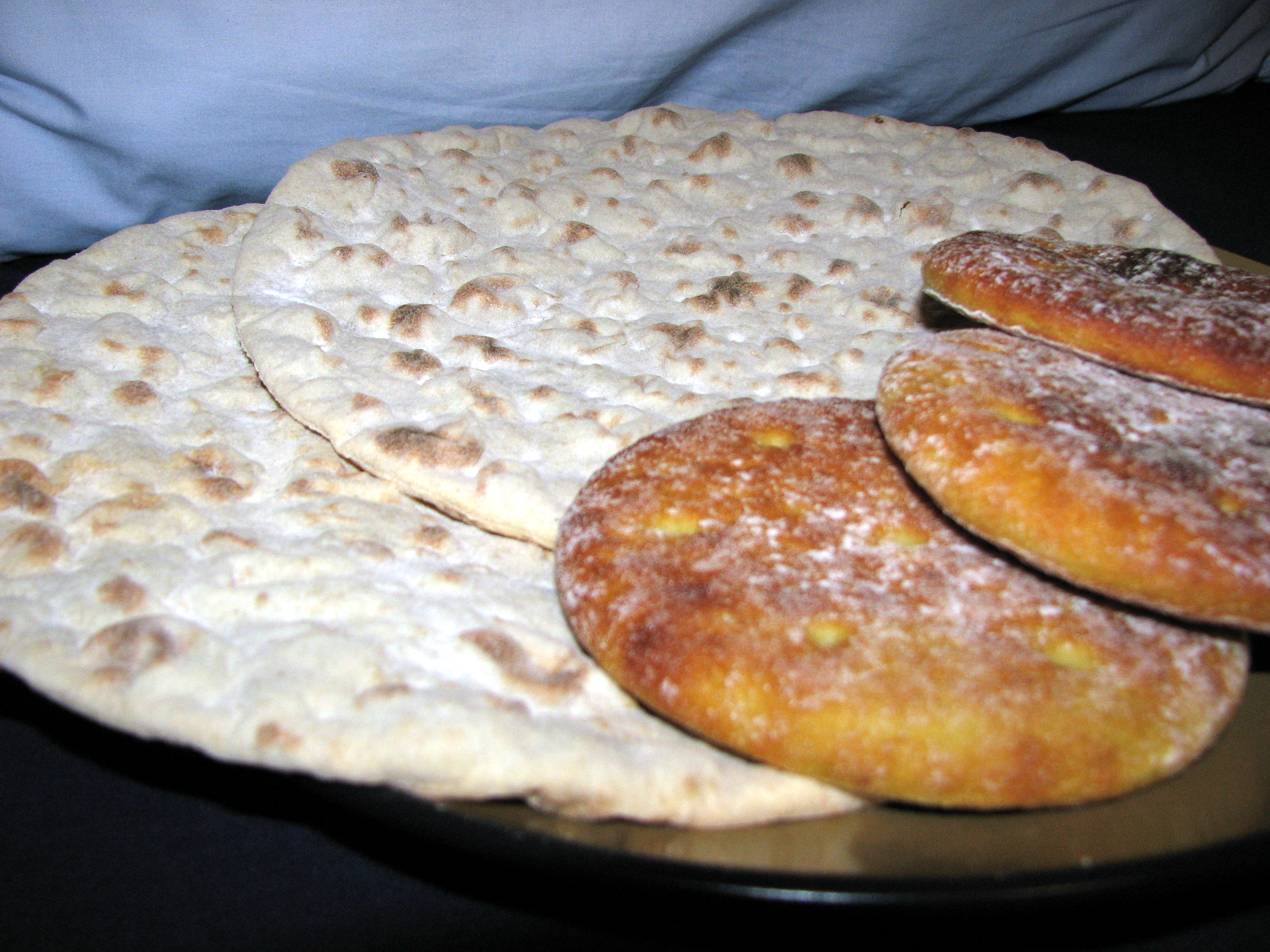
Rye (white) and potato (brown) rieska

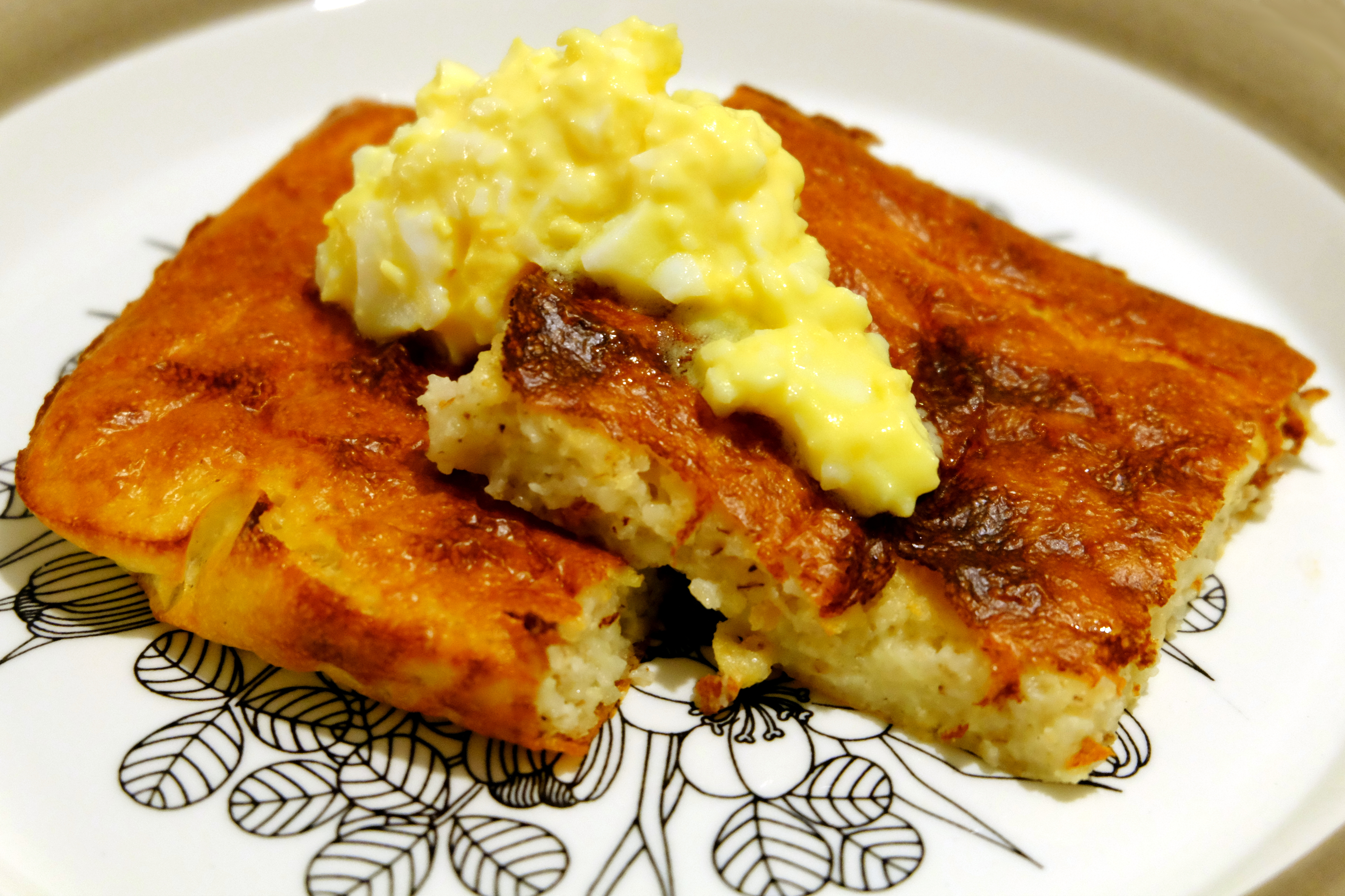
Savonian-style barley rieska served with munavoi (mixture of mashed hard-boiled eggs and butter)

Rieska (pronounced ['ries.ka]) is unleavened, usually barley-based, soft flatbread. Simple rieska contains only flour, salt, and water, but industrial bakeries usually use yeast as well. Rieska has many local varieties in different parts of Finland regarding ingredients and preparation. It is usually baked in the oven, or alternatively on a frying pan (like pancake) or even on a heated stone. The dough is sometimes made from rye or potato. Milk rieska is a traditional food in the Ylivieska area, and is made with milk instead of water.

== Confectionery ==
=== Pulla ===
Pulla is a cardamom-flavoured, yeast-leavened sweetened bread, often served with coffee. The usual recipe is based on milk, sugar, wheat flour, butter, with yeast and a very small amount of salt as additives, and cardamom or saffron as spices. Pulla is similar to but drier than a brioche, as eggs are not added into the dough. In contrast to many other nationalities' sweetened breads, pulla isn't buttered. When flavored with cinnamon and sugar and cut into spirals before baking, it becomes korvapuusti (cinnamon roll).

=== Sokerikorppu ===
A korppu (see above) sweetened with sugar and spiced with cinnamon is called sokerikorppu.

== See also ==
- Bagel
- Finnish cuisine
- Nordic bread culture
