= Ruisleipä =

Finnish rye bread

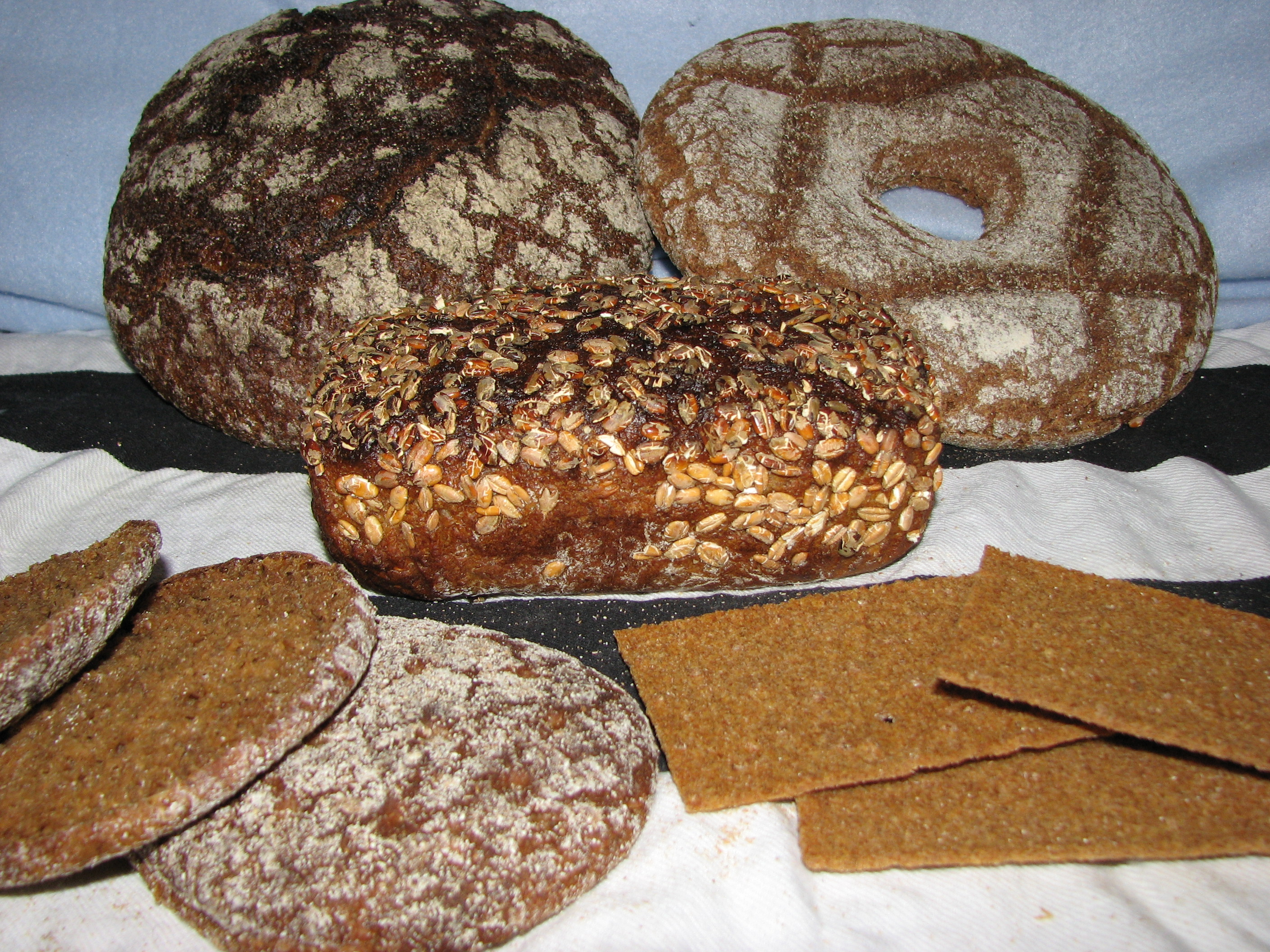
5 types of Finnish rye bread (top to bottom/left to right): limppu, reikäleipä, loaf, reissumies and hapankorppu.

Ruisleipä (Finnish pronunciation: [ˈrui̯sˌlei̯pæ], rye bread) is a dark sourdough rye bread produced extensively in Finland. It is the most popular type of bread in Finland. It is a staple in Finnish cuisine, and holds the status of the national food, as determined by a 2017 vote. Finland celebrates ruisleivän päivä (rye bread day) on February 28.

Unlike the more internationally popular German rye breads, Finnish rye bread tends to have a less oily or moist texture. Most common variations of Finnish rye bread lack sweetness and the addition of spices like caraway, distinguishing them from Swedish counterparts. Finnish rye bread is made from whole grain rye flour, distinguishing it from bread made with lighter and finer sifted rye flour. Storage plays a crucial role in maintaining the bread's texture. Freshly consumed rye bread is thick, while bread stored for an extended period becomes thin.

Traditional rye bread shapes vary, with large, round, and thick bread being the most common. In Karelia and Savo, this type of soft rye bread, often referred to simply as leipä (bread) or musta leipä (black bread), was a weekly staple. Other regional varieties had distinct names based on grain type and acidity levels. One traditional form, called reikäleipä (hole bread) or ruisreikäleipä (rye hole bread), is a characteristic of western Finland. Traditionally, it was baked in ring shapes and suspended on poles just below kitchen ceilings to dry and be stored. Dried reikäleipä could be stored over winter and required moistening before consumption. Another variant is the somewhat softer limppu or ruislimppu.

More modern variations of rye bread, angular in shape, have become popular in Finland. Commercially, Vaasan Ruispala claims the title of Finland's most popular bread. Similar to reikäleipä but designed for single portions, it borrows elements from German rye bread, deviating from traditional Finnish textures. Competing products like Fazer's Ruispuikulat and Oululainen's Reissumies offer alternative shapes while maintaining a more traditional formulation than Ruispala.

== See also ==
- Rugbrød
- Rúgbrauð
- Ruisreikäleipä
- Finnish bread
