= Rugbrød =

Danish-style rye bread

rugbrød
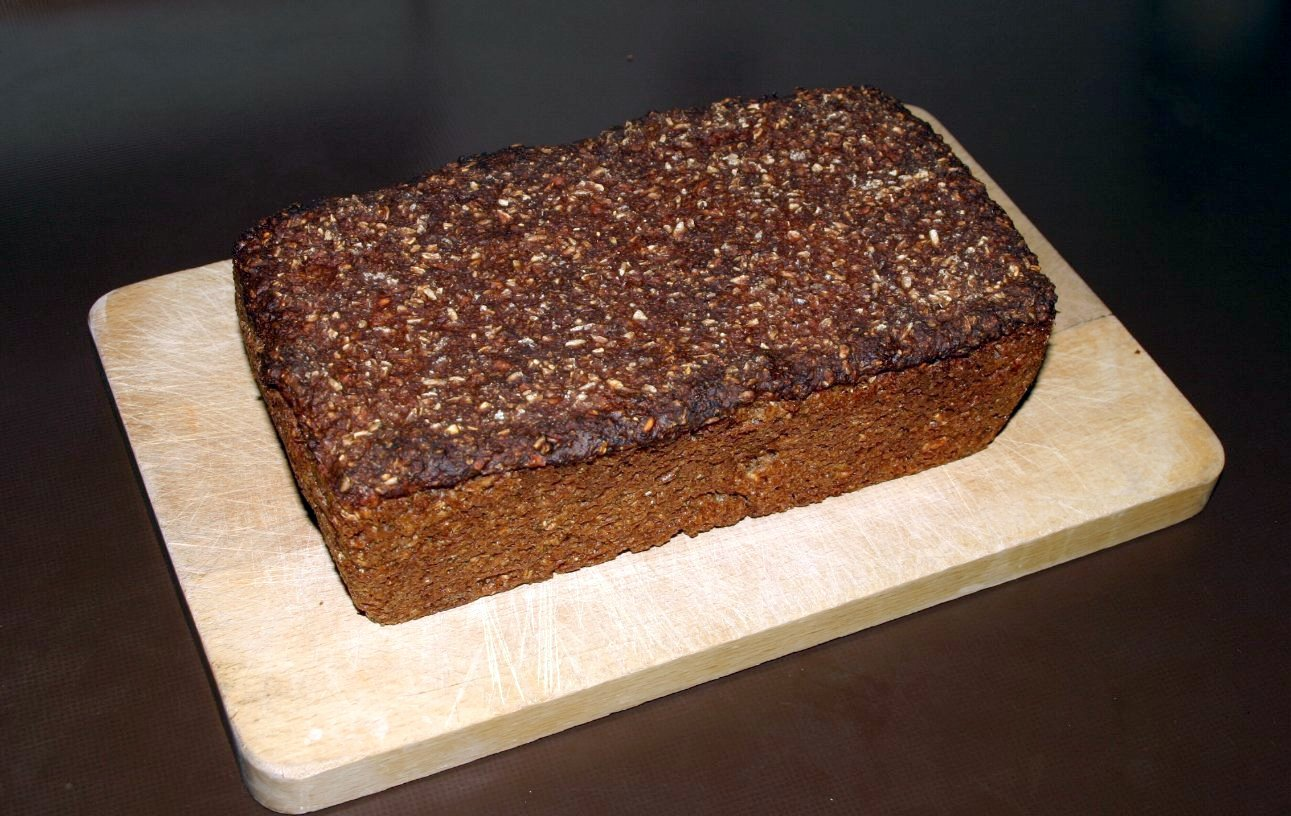
- A full-size loaf of rugbrød
- Type: Rye bread
- Place of origin: Denmark
- Main ingredients: Sourdough

Rugbrød (Danish pronunciation: [ˈʁuˌpʁœðˀ], lit. 'rye bread') is a very common form of rye bread from Denmark. Rugbrød usually resembles a long brown extruded rectangle, no more than 12 cm (4.7 in) high, and 30 to 35 cm (11.8 to 13.8 in) long, depending on the bread pan in which it is baked. The basic ingredient is rye flour which will produce a plain or "old-fashioned" bread of uniform, somewhat heavy structure, but the most popular versions today contain whole grains (cracked or chopped rye kernels) and often other seeds such as sunflower seeds, linseeds or pumpkin seeds. Most Danes eat rugbrød every day.

The dough may be made exclusively with rye flour or contain up to one third whole rye grains. A small amount of wheat flour, sugar or molasses is often added to adjust the taste or because contrary to former times wheat flour is cheaper than rye.

Rugbrød was the major staple of most of the population until potatoes became widespread during the late 19th century, and even up to the 1950s, Danes ate much larger amounts of rugbrød than today. It has been discussed why this bread type prevailed better in Denmark than other Northern European countries. Rugbrød is implied in the colloquial Danish term for serving prison time, på vand og brød ('on water and bread'). Until 1933, prisoners could in some circumstances be punished with an allowance of only water, a fixed amount of rugbrød, salt and possibly lard.

Rugbrød is regarded somewhat difficult for home baking. Apart from the sourdough preparation, the loaves must not be leavened for too long, or else the taste can become excessively sour, with the relatively pungent acetic acid taking the lead over milder-tasting lactic acid, and enzymes can cause the gluten (protein structure) and starches to degrade and collapse, creating cavities or dense lumps inside the bread or even causing it to shrink during or after baking. Rarely, recipes replace some of the water with ale or beer, but this is not necessary to create the characteristic sourdough taste.

Sourdough is almost always used for the base dough, as commercial yeasts are unsuitable. The naturally fermented dough will develop a Lactobacillus culture in symbiotic combination with naturally present yeasts. It is essential in baking rye-based breads because the chemistry of rye flour produces an environment that is acidic. The most commonly present yeast species in the production of naturally leavened dough is Saccharomyces exiguus, which is more acid-tolerant than commercially produced S. cerevisiae, although the latter and other strains may also be present. Research has shown that when creating a naturally fermented starter, any naturally present S. cerevisiae will have died off after a few days. Sourdough is thus a stable culture of lactic acid bacteria and yeast in a mixture of flour and water. The yeast produces carbon dioxide which leavens the dough, and the bacteria produces lactic acid which contributes flavor. The bacteria metabolizes sugars that the yeast cannot, and the yeast metabolizes byproducts of bacterial fermentation. Commercially produced yeast will not accomplish these processes in rye flour.

Rugbrød contains little or no added oils and is low in fat. Additional flavourings, other than salt, can include barley malt syrup or sugar. The bread is rich in protein and dietary fiber and not very sweet, unlike Swedish and German rye bread.

Buttered rugbrød is essentially the base for Danish open sandwich smørrebrød.

== See also ==
- Danish cuisine
- Pumpernickel
- Rúgbrauð
- Ruisleipä
- Schwarzbrot
- Øllebrød
