= Rye bread =

Type of bread made with various proportions of flour from rye grain

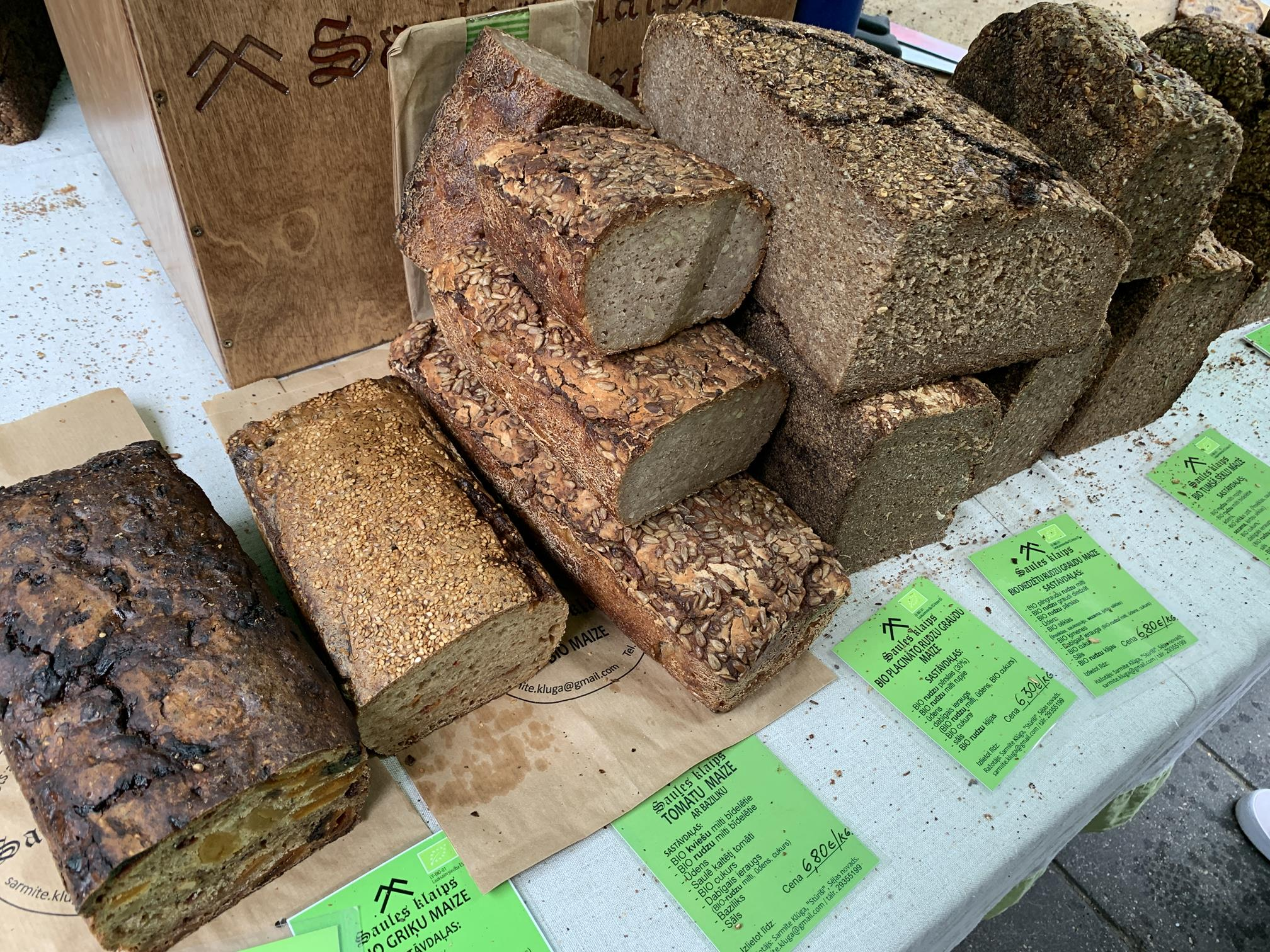
- Different kinds of rye bread
- Type: Bread
- Region or state: Europe, North America
- Main ingredients: Rye flour

Rye bread is a type of bread made with various proportions of flour from rye grain. It can be light or dark in color, depending on the type of flour used and the addition of coloring agents, and is typically denser than bread made from wheat flour. Compared to white bread, it is higher in fiber, darker in color, and stronger in flavor. The world's largest exporter of rye bread is Poland.

Rye bread was considered a staple through the Middle Ages. Many different types of rye grain have come from north-central, western, and eastern European countries such as Iceland, Germany, Poland, Austria, Denmark, Sweden, Norway, Finland, Estonia, Latvia, Lithuania, Belarus, Ukraine, Russia, the Netherlands, Belgium, France, and Czechia, and it is also a specialty in the canton of Valais in Switzerland.

Archaeobotanical discoveries in Britain and Ireland show it was in use in both areas since at least the early Iron Age. However, evidence of sustained intentional cultivation, especially before then, is uncertain. Rye cultivation in Britain and Ireland became relatively uncommon in the 1700s due to a shift in farming techniques and technology during the Second Agricultural Revolution.

== Biochemistry ==
Timelapse of a fresh rye sourdough culture rising over a 10-hour period at roughly 25.5 °C (78 °F)

While rye and wheat are genetically similar enough to interbreed (resulting in hybrids known as triticale), their biochemistries differ enough that they affect the breadmaking process. The key issue is differing amylases, the enzyme which breaks starch down into sugar. While wheat amylases are generally not heat-stable and thus do not affect stronger wheat gluten that gives wheat bread its structure, rye amylase remains active at substantially higher temperatures. Since rye gluten (secalin) is not particularly strong, rye dough structure is based on complex polysaccharides, including rye starch and pentosans. As a result, amylases in rye flour can break down dough structure, inhibiting it from rising.

There are two common solutions: The traditional manner, developed where obtaining wheat was impractical because of marginal growing conditions or supply difficulties, uses dough acidification to impede the function of rye amylases. Lowering dough pH, however, compromises the use of relatively acid-intolerant Saccharomyces cerevisiae-based "baker's yeast". Instead, the addition of naturally acidic Lactobacillus "sourdough" cultures lowers bread pH, facilitating the growth of an acid-tolerant yeast strain, and helping gelatinize starches in the dough matrix. The byproduct of this approach is lighter bread.

In areas where high-gluten hard wheat is readily available, the need for a complex polyculture of bacteria and yeast can often be reduced or removed by adding a large proportion of hard wheat flour to the rye flour. Its added gluten compensates for amylase activity on the starch in the dough, allowing the bread to retain its structure as it bakes. The "deli rye" tradition in the United States is based upon this mixing of grains. Use of high-gluten wheat flour also makes multigrain bread possible, like the "rye and Indian" bread of the American colonies, which combined rye and wheat with cornmeal in one loaf.

Rye bread contains phenolic acids and ferulic acid dehydrodimers.

== Types ==
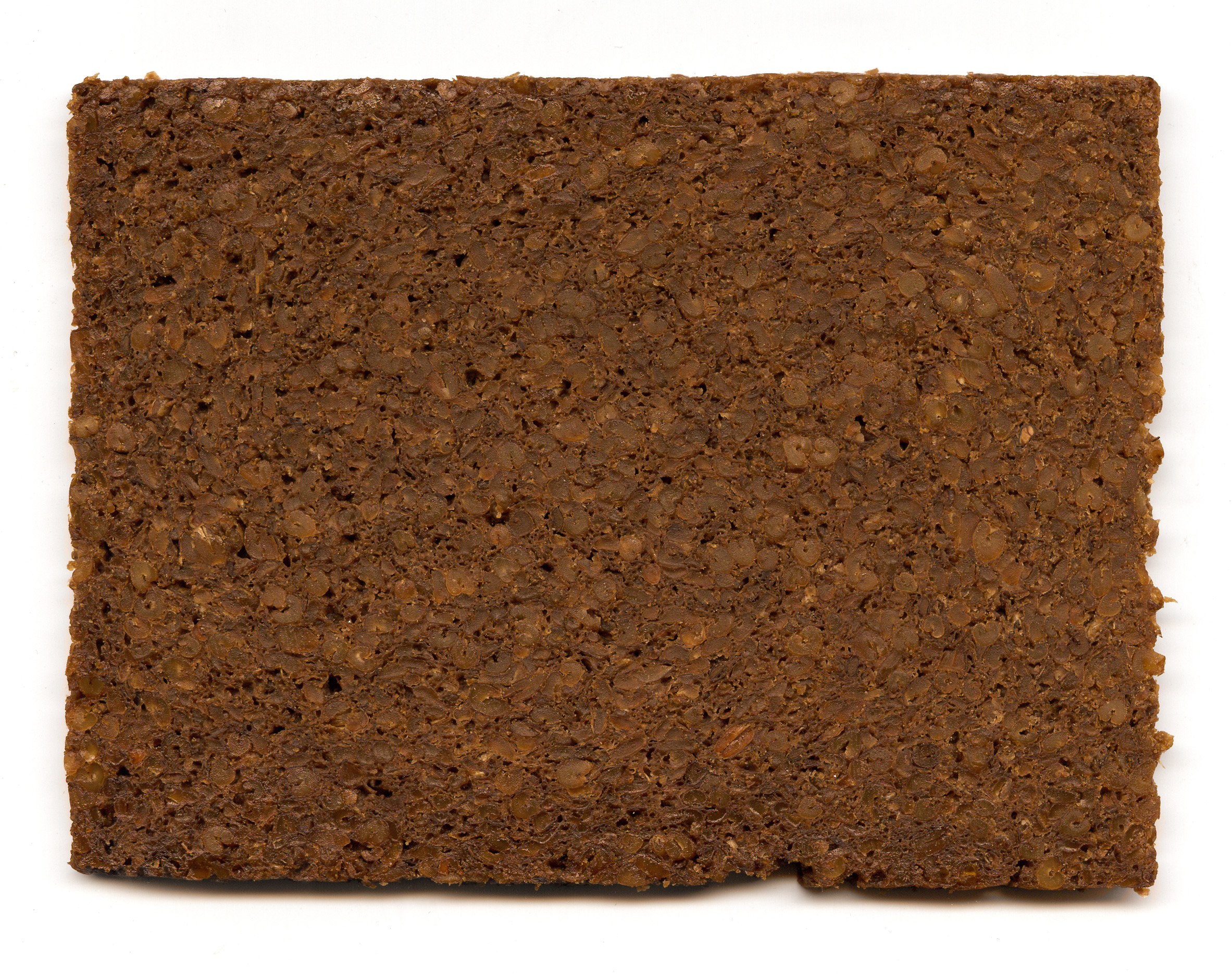
A very dense wholegrain pumpernickel

Pure rye bread contains only rye flour, without any wheat. German-style pumpernickel, a dark, dense, and close-textured loaf, is made from crushed or ground whole rye grains, usually without wheat flour, baked for long periods at a low temperature in a covered tin. Rye and wheat flours are often used to produce a rye bread with a lighter texture, color, and flavor than pumpernickel. "Light" or "dark" rye flour can be used to make rye bread; the flour is classified according to the amount of bran left in the flour after milling. Caramel or molasses for coloring and caraway seeds are often added to rye bread. In the United States, bread labeled as "rye" nearly always contains caraway unless explicitly labeled as "unseeded." In Canada (especially Montreal), bread labeled as "rye" often has no seeds, whereas bread labeled as "kimmel" is usually rye with caraway seeds. Some unique rye bread recipes include ground spices such as fennel, coriander, aniseed, cardamom, or citrus peel. In addition to caramel and molasses, ingredients such as coffee, cocoa, or toasted bread crumbs are sometimes used for both color and flavor in very dark, bread-like pumpernickel.

=== Straight ===
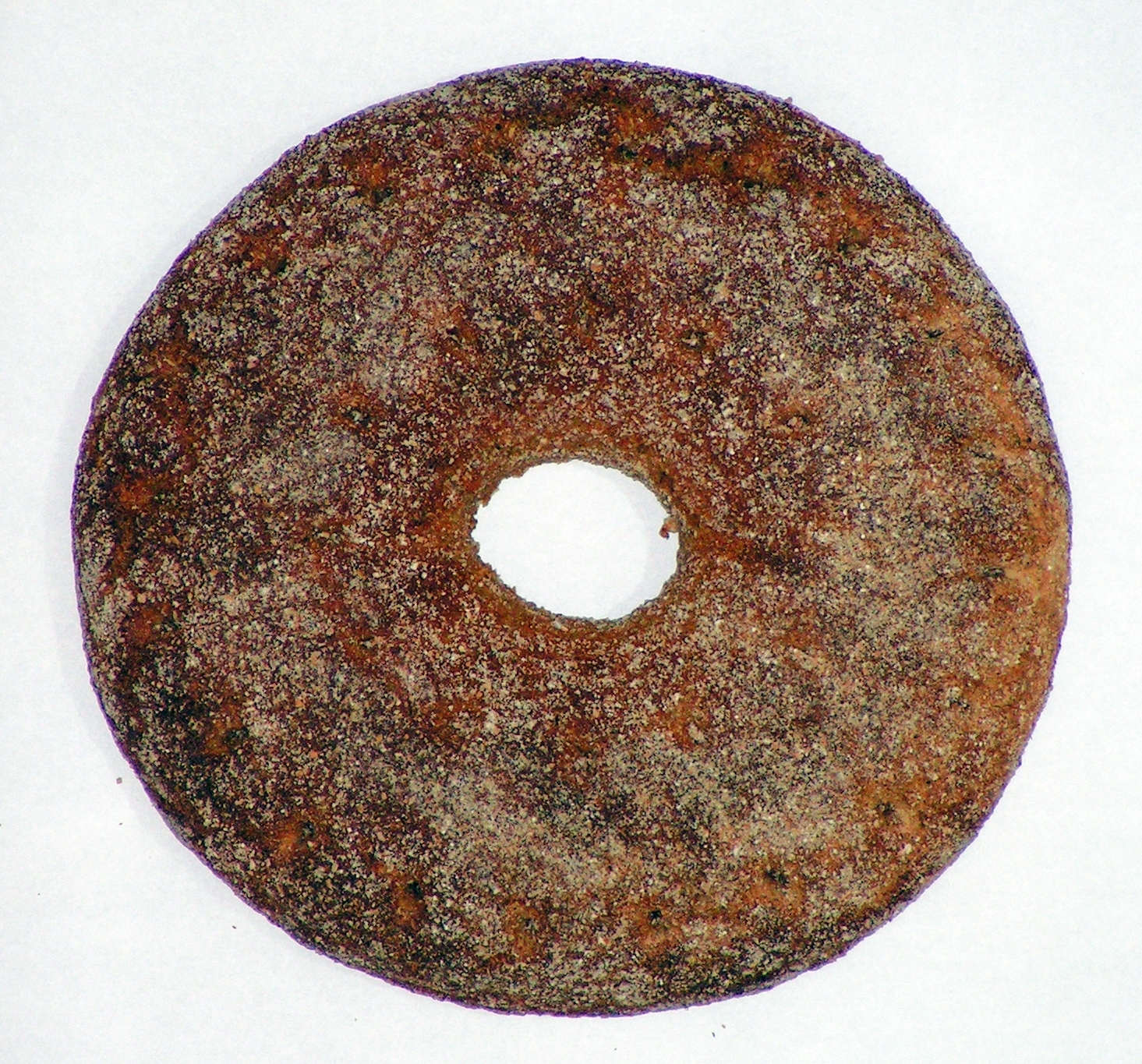
Finnish ruisreikäleipä hole-bread

A simple, all-rye bread can be made using a sourdough starter and rye meal; it will not rise as high as wheat bread but will be moister with a substantially longer shelf life. Such bread is often known as black bread (German: Schwarzbrot, Russian: чёрный хлеб) from their darker color than wheat bread (enhanced by long baking times, creating Maillard reactions in the crumb). The German Vollkornbrot (whole-grain bread) is something of an archetypical example, containing both rye meal and cracked whole rye grains (which are generally soaked overnight before incorporating into the dough). It is used both as a sandwich bread and as an appetizer substrate for such things as smoked fish and caviar. German-style pumpernickel has an even darker color derived from toasted, leftover bread and other agents. Due to the density of the bread, the yeast in the starter is used at least as much for the fermentation character in the bread itself as it is for leavening. Danish rugbrød (rye bread), another archetypical example, is typically made with sourdough, with either straight rye flour or mixed with whole and/or cracked rye kernels. Any bread containing wheat flour is not considered rugbrød, but white bread. A variety of seeds, such as pumpkin, poppy and caraway, may be added for taste. Rugbrød is a staple lunch food, typically eaten topped with cold or warm fish and meats, cheese, or any other cold cut.

As stated above, all-rye bread may have a very long shelf life, measured in months rather than days, and is popular as storage rations for long boat trips and outdoor expeditions. Such bread is sliced thinly because of its density, sometimes only a few millimeters thick, and is usually sold sliced in this manner.

All-rye bread from Scotland with treacle, currants and spices is sometimes called "New Year gingerbread".

==== Finland ====
Finnish rye bread or ruisleipä is a dark sourdough rye bread. The simplest form is made with rye flour, water, salt, and naturally occurring yeast. In 2017, it was voted as the national food of Finland and Finns celebrate ruisleivän päivä (rye bread day) on February 28.

=== Multigrain ===
It is fairly common to combine rye with other grains and seeds. In southern Germany and Switzerland, for example, it is not uncommon to find a variant of Vollkornbrot with sunflower seeds instead of the rye seeds, and some traditional recipes also substitute whole wheat grains for the rye grains. In the colonial era in North America, particularly in the United States, it became common to mix rye and cornmeal in what was known as "rye and Indian" or, if wheat flour was added, "thirded" bread; the resulting bread, though less dense than a whole-rye bread, was still heavier than the more expensive wheat-only breads that later became commonplace.

In medieval Europe, a mixed rye and wheat bread known as "maslin" (or variants of the name) was the bread of the better-off peasants for hundreds of years, in contrast to the white manchet bread eaten by the rich, and the horsebread eaten by the poorer peasants, which was made of cheaper grains including oats, barley and pulses.

=== Flatbreads ===
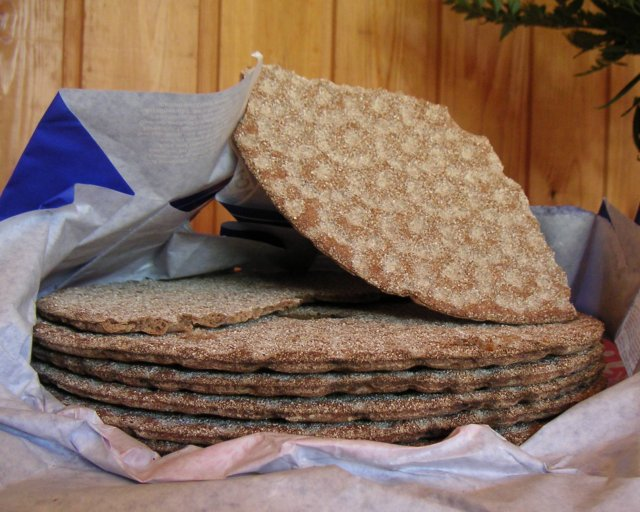
Nordic crispbread

There are three different types of rye crispbread: yeast-fermented, sourdough-fermented, and crispbread. Most of the crispbread produced in Scandinavia is baked after three to four hours of fermentation. Sourdough crispbreads are used in Estonia, Finland, Latvia, Lithuania, Poland, Germany, and India. The third type of crispbread is the so-called cold bread crispbread, essentially a type of hardtack (known in Sweden particularly as knäckebröd, in Norway as knekkebrød, in Denmark as knækbrød, in Finland as näkkileipä and in Estonia as näkileib), which is baked without the addition of any leavening. The dough gets the right texture from a foaming process, where air is incorporated into the cooled dough, which also leads to the sometimes almost white color of the finished bread, although not all types are light in color. Crispbread owes its long shelf life to its very low water content (5–7%).

One of the largest producers of rye flatbreads, and one of the most prominent in overseas markets, is the Swedish-founded company Wasabröd.

=== Quick breads ===
Rye flour is sometimes used in chemically leavened quick bread recipes as well, either batter-type or dough-type (similar to Irish soda bread). In such cases, it can be used in similar applications as whole wheat flour, since an egg matrix often provides the bread structure rather than the grain's gluten.

=== Jewish rye bread ===
==== U.S. ====
Wheat-rye bread, including light rye (sissel), American pumpernickel, and the combination of the two as marble rye, is closely associated with Jewish cuisine and Jewish-American cuisine, particularly the delicatessen. The bulk of the flour is white wheat flour (often a less-refined form known as first clear), with a substantial portion of rye mixed in for color and flavor. The dough is often leavened, in whole or in part, with sourdough, but sometimes uses a small addition of citric acid or vinegar to achieve the lowered pH needed to neutralize the rye amylases. The so-called Jewish rye is further seasoned with whole caraway fruits and glazed with an egg wash, and is traditionally associated with salted meats such as corned beef and pastrami.

High-gluten wheat flour can be used with rye flour to make a dough suitable for bagels. Jewish-style American rye bread is sometimes referred to as corn rye, possibly from the Yiddish korn ('grain'), or from the use of cornmeal as a coating and handling aid.

The Jewish-American variety has Eastern and Central European Jewish antecedents, including Russian Jewish style brown bread, Polish Jewish style rye bread and Latvian Jewish style rye bread.

==== Scandinavian Jewish ====
In Scandinavia, similar bread is made, due to the large Jewish community, some of which (in Swedish, called Vörtlimpa) also include sweeteners and/or citrus peel, as well as spices such as anise, fennel or cardamom, sometimes reserved for festive occasions.

==== Israel ====
In Israel, rye bread is popular due to the large population of Ashkenazi Jewish descent. It can be found in virtually every bakery and grocery store in Israel. It is commonly mass-produced and is very similar to the American mass-produced version, however, it is often very soft. Many bakeries in restaurants in places such as Tel Aviv and Jerusalem are redefining rye bread and are baking their own versions that are sometimes a twist on the traditional Jewish rye bread, and sometimes harken back to the most traditional Ashkenazi style rye bread.

==== Canada ====
In Canada, there are several different types of Jewish rye bread available in the country. There are mass-produced, prepackaged brands such as Oroweat. In communities with significant Jewish populations such as Montreal, Toronto, Winnipeg, and Vancouver, authentic Ashkenazi Jewish style rye bread is available at many kosher and kosher-style bakeries, delis, restaurants, and kosher grocery stores.

There is also Winnipeg-style rye bread which does not actually contain much, if any, rye flour. Instead, this Jewish-influenced bread is made from cracked rye or coarse rye meal, added to wheat flour. Winnipeg-style rye bread does not contain caraway fruits.

== Health benefits ==
Rye bread contains a large amount of fiber, a wide variety of bioactive compounds, and a small amount of fat. Compared to some breads such as white bread, rye bread has a lower glycemic index, which means it causes a slower increase in blood sugar than white bread after being eaten.

== Nutrition ==
Bread, rye
Nutritional value per 100 g (3.5 oz)
- Energy: 259 kcal (1,080 kJ)
- Carbohydrates: 48.30 g
- Sugars: 3.85
- Dietary fiber: 5.8 g
- Fat: 3.30 g
- Protein: 8.50 g
Vitamins and minerals
Vitamins	Quantity %DV^{†}
Vitamin A	7 IU
Thiamine (B1)	36% 0.434 mg
Riboflavin (B2)	26% 0.335 mg
Niacin (B3)	24% 3.805 mg
Vitamin B6	4% 0.075 mg
Vitamin C	0% 0.4 mg
Vitamin D	0% 0 IU
Vitamin E	2% 0.33 mg
Vitamin K	1% 1.2 μg
Minerals	Quantity %DV^{†}
Calcium	6% 73 mg
Iron	16% 2.83 mg
Magnesium	10% 40 mg
Phosphorus	10% 125 mg
Potassium	6% 166 mg
Sodium	26% 603 mg
Zinc	10% 1.14 mg
- Other constituents: Quantity
- Water: 37.30 g
- Link to Full Nutrient Report of USDA Database entry
- ^{†}Percentages estimated using US recommendations for adults, except for potassium, which is estimated based on expert recommendation from the National Academies.

== Types ==
- Borodinsky bread
- Crispbread, cracker made with rye flour
- Jewish rye bread
- Kommissbrot
- Pumpernickel
- Rugbrød
- Ruisleipä
- Ryvita
