= Ruisreikäleipä =

Traditional Finnish rye bread with a hole in the middle

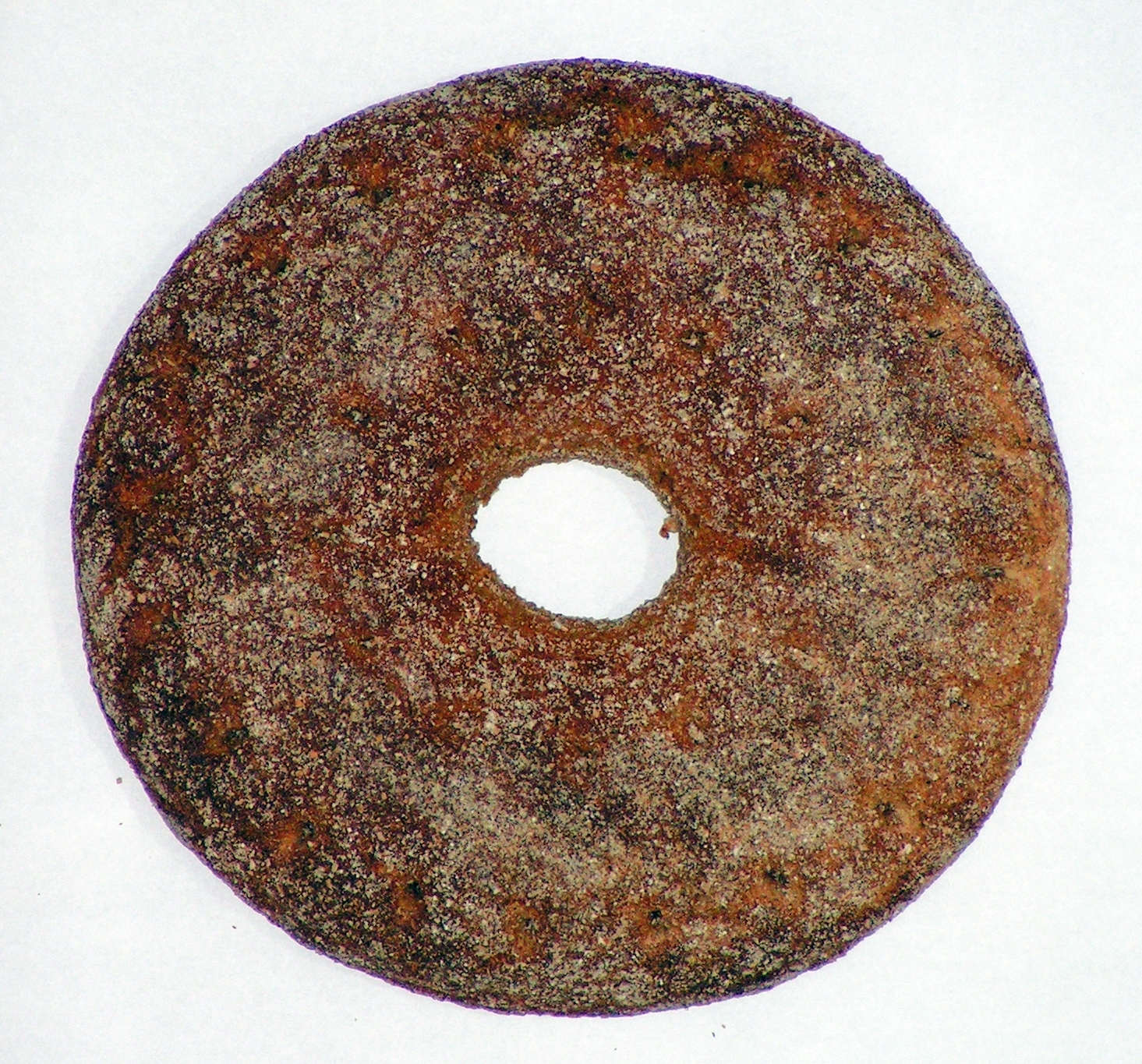
- Type: Ruisleipä
- Place of origin: Finland
- Main ingredients: Rye flour

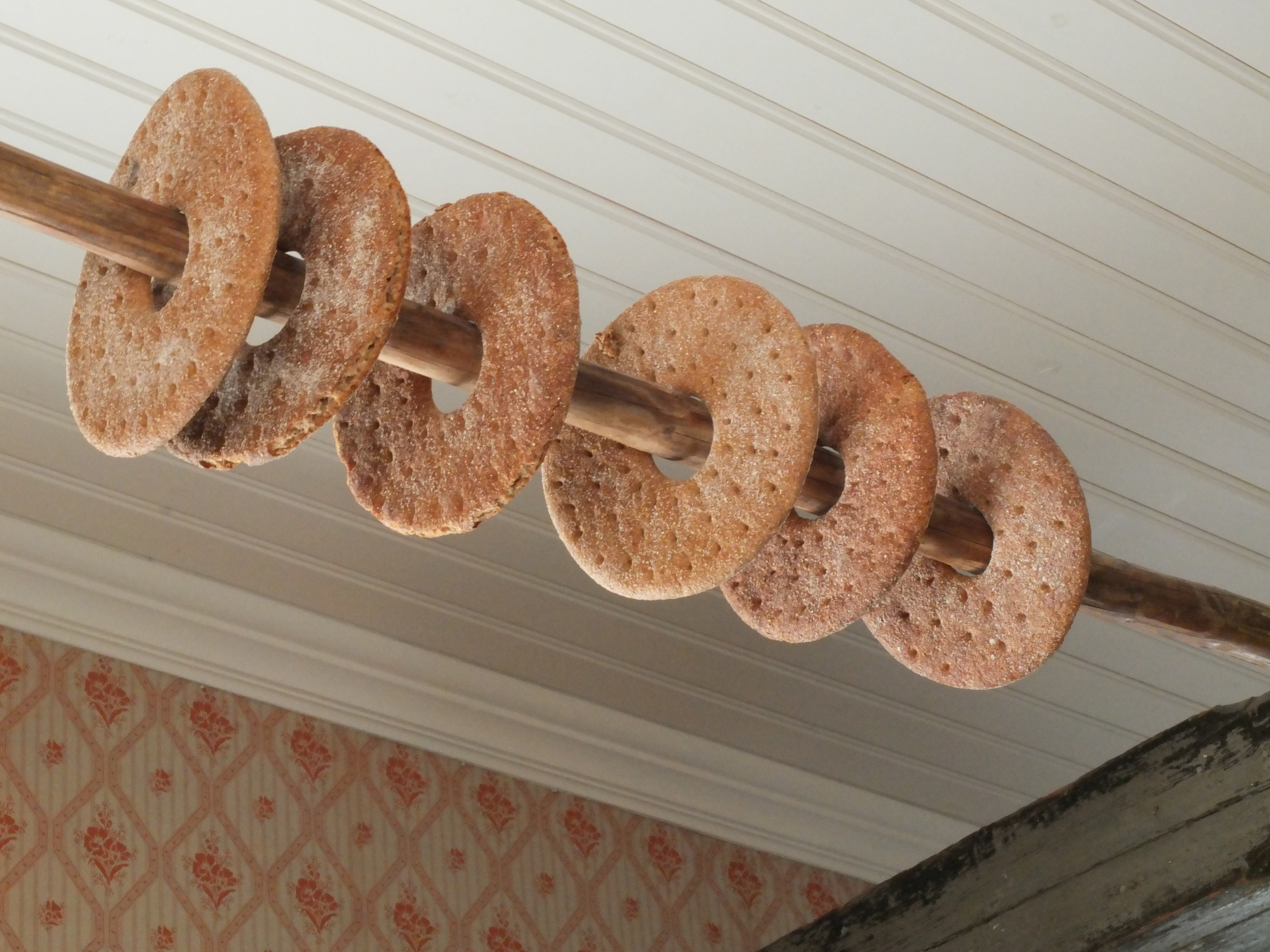
Bread hanging from a pole in the ceiling

Ruisreikäleipä (Finnish pronunciation: [ˈrui̯sˌrei̯kæˌlei̯pæ], rye hole-bread) is a kind of Finnish bread, a flat rye flour loaf with a hole in the middle. It is sometimes referred to as reikäleipä ([ˈrei̯kæˌlei̯pæ]), shorter term without ruis (rye) which applies also to the oat loaf with a hole.

The baking of ruisreikäleipä is a tradition in western Finland. In eastern Finland thick rye bread, usually called ruislimppu (rye loaf), is more common, but traditionally only bread baked from rye has been called bread in the Karelia and Savo (eastern) regions.

The hole had a functional purpose: the bread was baked in flat rings to be placed on poles suspended just below the kitchen ceiling to mature and dry in the relative warmth. Usually many loaves were baked at once. The poles also remained the place of storage so that the bread aged, in its many forms, over the long winter. Nowadays this kind of bread is available in all its forms and stages of aging throughout the whole of Finland, regardless of season, and is one main component of the Finnish diet.

The way it was prepared is related to the way houses used to be built in western Finland, that is with the baking oven separate from the heating oven. In eastern Finland, where the oven used to be heated every day, it was more common to eat freshly baked bread and to cook various kinds of long-stewed oven foods like the Karelian hot pot.

Unlike ruislimppu, there is no discernible difference between the skin and the core of ruisreikäleipä, as the dark outer color and the soft inner core are missing. Considerably more roughage is present, and the bread is rather dense compared to the other traditional breads. Some flour, seed and even yeast remnants can top the bread; less moisture is present; and the texture is somewhere between gummy, unyielding and downright crackery, depending on age. This reflects the bread's role as an indefinitely storable foodstuff which would last from the fertile summer through the relatively long and harsh northern winter.

As a result, ruisreikäleipä takes some time and effort to chew down properly. In the process it then acquires a peculiar culinary quality: it starts off as rather sour and earthy in taste, but by the time it is ready to be swallowed, amylase enzymes in the saliva have already broken down enough of the starch in it to make it sweeter.

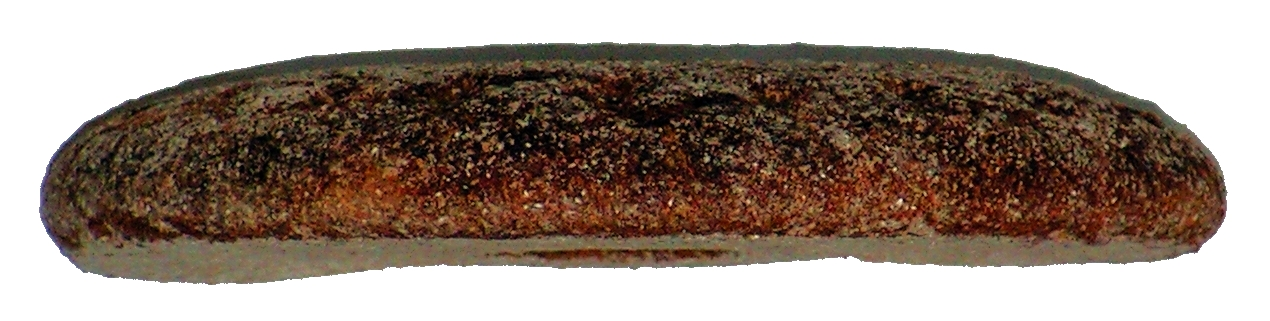
Ruisreikäleipä side view

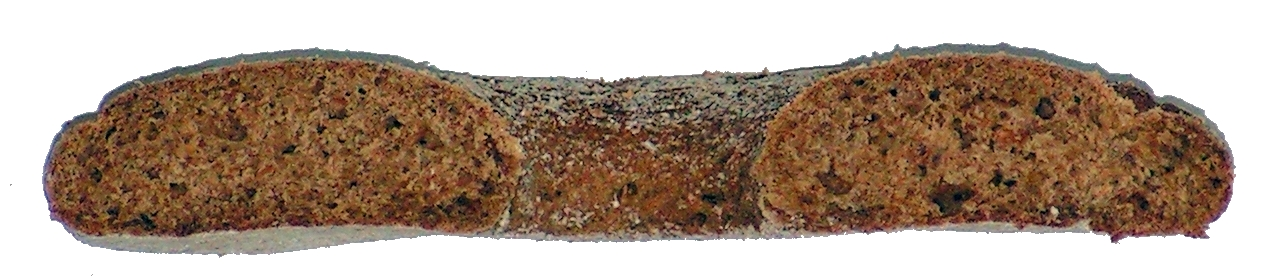
Ruisreikäleipä cross section

== See also ==
- Finnish bread
- Crispbread
- Ruisleipä
