= List of breads =

This is a list of notable baked or steamed bread varieties. This list does not include cakes, pastries, or fried dough foods, which are listed in separate Wikipedia articles. It also does not list foods in which bread is an ingredient which is processed further before serving.

== Breads ==
Name	Image	Type	Origin	Description (including main ingredients and notable aspects)
Anadama bread		Yeast bread	United States (New England)	A sweet, cornmeal- and molasses-based bread.
Anpan		Sweet bun	Japan	Filled, usually with red bean paste, or with white beans, sesame, or chestnut.
Appam "hoppers"		Varies widely	India; Indonesia; Sri Lanka	Bowl-shaped thin pancakes, made of fermented rice flour, shaped via cooking utensil, neutral taste, served usually with spicy condiment or curry, for breakfast or dinner.
Apple bread		Wheat germ bread	Taiwan	Made from wheat germ and eggs, some with apple fillings
Arboud		Unleavened	Jordan	Unleavened bread made from flour, water and salt, baked in the embers of a fire. Traditional among Arab Bedouin.
Arepa		Cornbread	South America (Northern)	Dish made of ground corn dough or cooked cornmeal, similar to Mesoamerican tortilla and Salvadoran pupusa.
Baba		Various thick, round breads	China (Northwestern Yunnan, Naxi people)	Round, thick bread, often with various sweet or savoury fillings.
Babka		Yeast bread	Poland, Ukraine	Sweet, braided bread popular among the Jewish diaspora.
Bagel		Yeast bread	Ashkenazi Jewish	Ring-shaped, usually with a dense, chewy interior; usually topped with sesame or poppy seeds baked into the surface. May be boiled in lye.
Baghrir Beghrir, ghrayef, mchahda	Baghrir with sugar	Pancake	Maghreb (Algeria, Morocco and Tunisia)	Pancake consumed in Algeria, Morocco and Tunisia. They are small, spongy, and made with semolina or flour; when cooked correctly, they are riddled with tiny holes (which soak up whatever sauce they are served with).
Baguette; French stick, French bread		Yeast bread	France	Thin elongated loaf, made of water, flour, yeast, and salt, instantly recognizable by slits cut in top surface before baking to allow gas expansion. Can be cut to resemble the shape of wheat and called Pain d'épi.
Bakarkhani		Flatbread	South Asia & Middle East	Thick, sweet or spicy flatbread made of dough, ghee, milk, sugar. Mostly consumed as snacks and also in iftar.
Balep korkun		Flatbread	Tibet (Central)	Round, flat, easy to make, made of barley flour, water, baking powder, cooked in frying pan; Balep Korkun is a type of bannock.
Bammy		Flatbread	Jamaica	A bread of cassava, baked on a griddle.
Banana bread		Quick bread	United States	Dense, made with mashed bananas, often a moist, sweet, cake-like quick bread, but some recipes are traditional yeast breads.
Bánh mì		Yeast bread	Vietnam	A variant of the French baguette, a Vietnamese baguette has a thin crust and white, airy crumb. It may consist of both wheat flour and rice flour.
Bannock		Quick bread	Great Britain & Ireland	Modern types are made with baking soda or baking powder as leavening agent, giving a light, airy texture. May be baked or fried. Some Native American peoples in North America prepare their own versions of bannock.
Bara brith		Fruit bread	United Kingdom (Wales)	Sometimes termed "speckled bread", raisins, currants and candied peel are added to dough.
Barbari bread		Flatbread	Iran; Afghanistan (Northwestern)	Invented by the Barbar tribes of Iran and Northern Afghanistan.
Barmbrack		Quick bread	Ireland	Sweeter than sandwich bread, but less rich than cake, contains sultanas and raisins to add texture.
Barm cake		Yeast bread	United Kingdom (England, Lancashire)	Soft sweet roll. Derived from ancient pre-Roman leavening process using barm. Pictured is barm cake with black pudding and melted butter.
Bastone; Italian stick, cane, staff		Yeast bread	Italy	Shorter and thicker than a French baguette. Sometimes with sesame seed garnish.
Bazin		Flatbread	Libya	Prepared with barley, water and salt.
Bazlama		Flatbread	Turkey	Flat and circular, average thickness of 2 cm, usually eaten fresh.
Beer bread		Quick or yeast bread	Germany	Made with regular beer or other types such as stout or dark beer.
Bhakri		Flatbread	India; Pakistan	Usually grayish in colour, made of cereals and thus high in protein and fibre like jowar, bajra or maize.
Bialy		Yeast bread	Poland	Similar to a bagel, but instead of a hole it has only a dimple on top, which is filled with a bit of butter and diced onion or garlic. Known as a cebularz in Poland.
Bibingka		Rice cake	Philippines	A type of rice cake baked in clay pot. Often with toppings of butter, salted duck egg, muscovado sugar, grated cheese and desiccated coconut.
Bing		Flatbread	China	Similar to a Mexican tortilla, only much thicker; usually cooked on a griddle.
Biscotti		Biscuit	Italy	Italian almond biscuits that are twice-baked, oblong-shaped, dry, crunchy, and may be dipped in a drink, traditionally Vin Santo.
Biscuit		Quick bread although sometimes made with yeast	United States, Canada	This refers to the North American quick bread, generally light and fluffy (similar to a scone). Elsewhere the term biscuit means a small baked product that would be called either a "cookie" or a "cracker" in the United States and most of English-speaking Canada.
Black bread		Rye	Russia	Made of rye grain, usually dark colored and high fiber, ranges from crispy in texture to dense and chewy.
Blaa		Bun	Ireland	Doughy, white bread bun (roll) specialty; particularly associated with Waterford, Ireland. Currently made in Waterford and County Kilkenny, and was historically made in Wexford.
Bolani		Flatbread	Afghanistan	Has a very thin crust and can be stuffed with a variety of ingredients, such as potatoes, spinach, lentils, pumpkin, or leeks.
Bolillo		Yeast bread or Sourdough	Mexico	A savoury bread commonly found in Mexico and Central America. It is a variation of the baguette, shorter in length (roughly 15 centimeters), with a crunchy crust and a soft inside known as migajón.
Bolo do caco		Flatbread	Portugal (Madeira)	A circular flatbread made with sweet potatoes.
Borlengo		Pancake	Italy	A thin crepe now made with milk, eggs (sometimes omitted), flour and salt. Originally a food eaten by the poor and made with flour and water.
Borodinsky		Sourdough	Russia	A dark brown sourdough rye bread, traditionally sweetened with molasses and flavored with coriander and caraway seeds.
Boule		Yeast bread	France; Belgium; Monaco	From the French for "ball".
Bread roll		Bun	Europe	Short, oblong or round, served usually before or with meals, often with butter.
Breadstick		Dry bread	Italy	A dry bread formed into sticks, served as an appetizer.
Brioche		Yeast bread, Sweet	France	A highly enriched bread, noted for its high butter and egg content, commonly served as a component of French desserts. Made in loaves or buns.
Broa		Cornbread	Portugal, Galicia, Angola, Mozambique, Cape Verde and Brazil	Unlike the cornbread typical of the southern United States, made of mix of cornmeal and wheat or rye flour, leavened with yeast rather than baking powder or baking soda.
Brown bread		Rye or wheat bread	Global	Made with a significant amount of whole grain flour, usually rye or wheat; sometimes made with molasses or coffee. Also known as "wholemeal bread".
Bublik		Wheat bread	Poland	Made from yeast-leavened wheat dough that commonly contains milk, butter, and egg whites and is rather sweet.
Canadian White		White bread	Canada	A thick, protein-rich sliced sandwich bread.
Carrot bread		Leavened	United States	May be prepared with grated carrot or carrot juice. Pictured is a vegan carrot bread with raisins.
Catalán		Leavened	Uruguay	Soft bun, similar to hamburger bread.
Česnica		Soda bread	Serbia	Baked during Christmas season with a solid silver coin in the dough for good luck; the family member whose bread piece contains the coin is viewed as the most fortunate for that year.
Challah		Leavened	Jewish	Braided, made with wheat flour, yeast, oil/butter and eggs (optional), usually made by Jewish people for the Shabbat.
Chapati		Flatbread	India Pakistan	Chapati is a circular flatbread made of flour, water, and oil that is then cooked on a stove. It's been a staple in Indian households for many centuries and is even mentioned in old Sanskrit texts. Chapati originated in India and later spread to Southeast and Central Asia, East Africa, and the Caribbean, where it remains part of the everyday diet.
Chickpea bread		Leavened	Albania; Turkey	Made from chickpea flour. The most significant difference of this type of bread is, instead of using regular yeast, they use a yeast made with chickpeas.
Chipá		Cheese bread	Argentina, Paraguay	Typical Paraguayan, made from cassava flour and cheese.
Cholermüs		Pancake	Switzerland	Also known as a "Swiss pancake", as its name self-explains, a Swiss pancake, or "shredded, fried crepe", is a breakfast pancake with dried fruit filling. This preparation should not be confused with Hollermus, or Holdermus, which is an elderberry mash.
Christmas wafer		Crispy bread	Poland/Central Europe	Christmas wafers are a ceremonial bread, usually embossed with images of Christian figures, such as Jesus or the Virgin Mary.
Ciabatta		White bread	Italy	Loaf is somewhat elongated, broad and flattish and, like a slipper, should be somewhat collapsed in the middle.
Coffin bread		Bread bowl	Taiwan	Bread is hollowed out and either toasted or fried before it is filled with a creamy stew of chicken, seafood, tripe, or mushroom. It is then topped with a piece of toasted or fried bread, creating the "coffin" look
Coppia Ferrarese		Sourdough	Italy	Twisted in shape. Sourdough bread made with flour, lard, olive oil, and malt.
Cornbread		Cornbread	Americas	Made from cornmeal, can be baked or fried, has a golden appearance, usually has a moist interior.
Cottage loaf		Yeast bread	United Kingdom (England)	Name refers mostly to shape of loaf, not consistency, loaves are made when larger and smaller roughly spherical balls are squashed together, forming a cottage shape.
Cozonac		Sweet leavened bread	Romania, Bulgaria	Prepared with milk, yeast, eggs, sugar, butter, raisins, lokum, grated orange or lemon zest, walnuts or hazelnuts, and vanilla or rum flavor.
Cracker		Crispy bread	United States; United Kingdom; Isle of Man	A baked good typically made from a grain and flour, dough and usually manufactured in large quantities. Crackers (roughly equivalent to savory biscuits in the United Kingdom and the Isle of Man) are usually flat, crisp, small in size (usually 3 inches or less in diameter) and made in various shapes, commonly round or square.
Crêpe		Pancake	France	Extremely thin pancakes, usually stuffed with sweet fillings, such as jam, butter, sugar, honey, salted caramel or chocolate-hazelnut spread. In Canada, they are often filled with fruit and consumed as a breakfast dish.
Cremona		Yeast bread	Argentina	A layered flower-shaped bread, made with flour, water, salt, yeast, and butter (also can be substituted for margarine or animal fat).
Crisp bread		Crispy bread	Scandinavia	Very dry, traditionally consists of wholemeal rye flour, salt, and water.
Croissant		Yeast bread	France	A crescent-shaped Viennoiserie made with flour, water, salt, butter, and yeast. It is buttery and flaky.
Crumpet		Flatbread	United Kingdom (England)	Usually circular and flat, but thick, with pores in upper surface. This gives it a light, spongy texture.
Cuban bread		Yeast bread, White	United States (Florida); Cuba	A fairly simple white bread, similar to French bread and Italian bread, but has a slightly different baking method and ingredient list.
Damper		Unleavened bread (traditionally)	Australia	Made of a wheat flour, traditionally baked in the coals of a campfire; iconic Australian dish.
Dampfnudel		Sweet bread, White	Germany	Usually dense and moist with a white top surface.
Dhebra	Dhebra	Flatbread	India (Gujarat)	Millet/Bajra, wholewheat bread, embedded with fresh methi (fenugreek) leaves and sesame seeds.
Dosa		Pancake	India (Southern)	Fermented crêpe or pancake made from rice batter and black lentils. It is also served with variety of fillings like potato, coconut, paneer, vegetables, dry fruits etc.
Dumb bread		Unleavened	Virgin Islands	This bread does not require any yeast. Ingredients include flour, water, butter, sugar, baking powder, salt, and milk; oftentimes, shredded coconut is also added to the dough.
Eggette		Pancake	Hong Kong	Spherical pancake or ball waffle popular in Hong Kong and Macao. The food item is also referred to as an egg puff, egg waffle, puffle or by its Cantonese name, gai daan jai, and is made from eggs, sugar, flour, and light evaporated milk.
Eish merahrah		Flatbread	Egypt	Made with fenugreek seeds and maize; dough allowed to ferment overnight, then flattened and baked.
English muffin		Yeast bread	England	Small, round, thin, usually dusted with semolina and served split horizontally, toasted, buttered, eaten as a snack alone or part of meal, usually breakfast or, in the UK and Ireland, early-evening tea. In the UK, usually just called a "muffin".
Farl		Flatbread	United Kingdom (Scotland)	Made by spreading dough on a griddle or skillet in a rough circular shape, then cutting it into four equal pieces and cooking.
Farinata		Chickpea flour flatbread from Italy	Argentina, Italy, Uruguay	Flat bread made with chickpea flour and water, also known as fainá (masculine noun in Uruguay, feminine noun in Argentina).
Felipe		Leavened	Argentina, Paraguay, Uruguay	Hard crust, leavened, wheat.
Filone		Leavened	Italy	Similar to a French baguette.
Flatbread		Flatbread	Global	Bread that is flat in shape, often round in shape. Cooked and eaten in many cultures around the world.
Flatbrød		Flatbread	Norway	Traditional food, usually eaten with fish, salted meats and soups.
Flatkaka		Flatbread, Rye	Iceland	Soft, round, thin and dark with a characteristic pattern from the frying pan; traditionally fried in small, heavy cast-iron frying pans.
Focaccia		Yeast bread	Italy	Often punctured or dotted with a knife to relieve surface bubbling.
Fougasse		Yeast bread	France	Some versions are sculpted or slashed into a pattern resembling an ear of wheat.
Fugazza		leavened flat bread with onions	Argentina, Uruguay	Also known as figazza in Uruguay, fugazzeta is an Argentinian variation.
Graham bread			United States	A whole wheat bread inspired by Sylvester Graham.
Galleta de Campaña			Argentina, Uruguay, Paraguay	Layered wheat bread with lard.
Galette		Pancake	France	Extremely thin pancakes also called a buckwheat galette or Breton galette, it is similar to a crêpe, but made with buckwheat rather than flour. It is traditionally filled with savory fillings, such as ham, cheese, eggs, mushroom, tomatoes, onions or salad.
Green onion pancake		Flatbread	China	Savory, non-leavened flatbread folded with oil and minced scallions (green onions). Unlike a true pancake, it is made from dough instead of batter.
Guokui		Flatbread	China	Flatbread made from flour with different regional variations, often cooked in a cylindrical oven.
Hallulla		Flatbread	Chile	Round, baked with butter, used for Chilean aliados: cheese and ham sandwich.
Hard dough bread		Yeast bread	Jamaica	A common sandwich bread.
Hardbrood		Flatbread, White	Netherlands (Groningen)	Dry white flat bread, consisting of two layers, each as thick as an American pancake, that are connected at the dents.
Hardtack		Flatbread, Crispy	Egypt, Mediterranean Basin	Simple type of cracker or biscuit, made from flour, water, and sometimes salt.
Himbasha		Flatbread	Eritrea; Ethiopia	Celebratory, slightly sweet, often served at special occasions, several varieties, most distinctive flavoring is ground cardamom seeds.
Hoagie Roll		Leavened	United States	A type of long roll used to prepare hoagie sandwiches. Ingredients used in hoagie roll preparation include flour, egg, milk, vegetable oil, salt, sugar and yeast. Some versions include sesame seeds atop the roll
Hot and spicy cheese bread		Yeast bread	United States (Madison, Wisconsin)	Made from a brioche-like yeasted dough, mixed with provolone cheese, Monterey Jack cheese, and topped with crushed hot red peppers.
Injera		Flatbread	Eritrea; Ethiopia	Risen with a fermented starter with unique, slightly spongy texture, traditionally made of teff flour.
Johnnycake or Hoecake		Flatbread	United States	Fried gruel made of yellow or white cornmeal, mixed with salt, hot water or milk and cooked in a skillet or oven; sometimes sweetened; attributed to Native Americans.
Ka'ak		Leavened	Near East; The Middle East; Arab World; Armenia	Varies with bread rings and sweets.
Kalach		Yeast bread	East Slavs	Kettlebell-shaped or ring-shaped bread.
Kamir		Yeast bread	Indonesia	Round shape bread made of yeast, flour, butter, egg mixture and banana or tapai.
Karē pan		Bun	Japan	Some Japanese curry is wrapped in a piece of dough, which is coated in flaky bread crumbs, and usually deep fried or baked.
Khachapuri		Flatbread	Georgia	Cheese-filled bread. Different varieties have different shapes and fillings.
Khanom bueang		Flatbread, Crispy	Thailand	Common Thai street food, resemble tacos made of rice flour, usually first topped or filled with coconut cream, then sweet or savory toppings: shredded coconut, strips of fried eggs or egg yolks, chopped scallions.
Khakhra		Flatbread, Crispy	India (Gujarat)	Common Gujarati food, resembling roti or chapati in its round shape, but crispy and dry.
Khooba Roti		Flatbread, Soft	India (Rajasthan)	Common Rajasthani food, resembling a thicker version of roti or chapati in its round shape, a little hard from outside but soft inside. Made with ghee and wheat flour. In some parts of Rajasthan it's also called Jadi Roti.
Kifli		Yeast bread	Austria	Similar to a bagel, but the dough starts as a wedge and is rolled into a crescent shape rather than a circle – or sometimes into a straight stick. The kipferl is usually given an egg wash and sprinkled with either poppy seeds or caraway seeds mixed with coarse salt.
Kisra		Flatbread	Sudan; South Sudan	Popular fermented bread made of sorghum (durra) or wheat
Kitcha		Flatbread	Ethiopia; Eritrea	Also known as kitta or caccabsaa, a wheat-flour flatbread cooked in a pan. Often used to make fit-fit.
Komeko pan		Rice bread	Japan	Made from rice flour.
Kulcha		Flatbread	India; Pakistan (Punjab)	Made of maida flour dough, mashed potatoes, onion (optional), many spices, rolled into flat round shape, baked until golden brown, usually rubbed with butter, eaten with spicy chickpea curry.
Lagana		Crispy bread	Greece	Special kind of azyme bread, baked only on Clean Monday, the first day of Lent. Not to be confused with lasagna.
Lahoh		Leavened	Djibouti; Somalia; Yemen	Spongy, pancake-like, dough of plain flour, self-raising flour, warm water, yeast, pinch of salt.
Lángos		Yeast bread	Hungary; Austria	Dough patty baked in fat. It is served as a snack with sour cream and cheese as well as with ham, onion and parsley. It is served warm.
Laobing		Flatbread	China (Northern)	Unleavened, sometimes called a "Chinese pancake", very much like Indian chapati, can be size of a large pizza, about one centimeter thick, doughy and chewy texture, made by pan frying thick unleavened batter made of salt, flour, water.
Laufabrauð		Flatbread	Iceland	Laufabrauð is a traditional kind of Icelandic bread that is most often eaten in the Christmas season.
Lavash		Flatbread	Iran; Armenia	Soft, thin, dough is rolled out flat, flexible when fresh, easier to use for wrap sandwiches, dries fast and grows brittle and hard, for long storage. A traditional dish of Armenian cuisine. In 2014, "lavash, the preparation, meaning and appearance of traditional bread as an expression of culture in Armenia" was inscribed in the UNESCO Representative List of the Intangible Cultural Heritage of Humanity.
Lefse		Flatbread	Norway	Soft, made of potato, milk or cream (or sometimes lard), flour, cooked on a griddle.
Limpa		Yeast bread	Scandinavia	A sweet, spiced rye bread.
Llonguet		Yeast bread	Catalan Countries, especially the island of Mallorca.	Llonguet or French bread is a type of small oval bread with a groove on the top. It is made with flour, water, yeast and salt. It is a bun, similar to a French roll, with a consistent crust and loose crumb that is mainly used to make sandwiches.
Lye roll		Yeast bread	Germany	Rolls that are coated or immersed in lye before baking, though baking soda or washing soda may be substituted. A more generalized form of the pretzel.
Malooga or Maluj		Flatbread	Yemen	Pizza-like dough (flour, water, yeast, salt) kneaded well, risen, cut to large rounds, stretched, repeatedly warm ghee spread on dough as it is folded, round is stretched into flat round form, baked in tandoor-like oven.
Maltese bread or Ħobż tal-Malti		Sourdough	Malta	Traditional Maltese bread originating in Qormi, often served with tomato paste and olive oil.
Mantou		Bun	China	Steamed, made of white flour, often slightly sweetened.
Markook		Flatbread	Levant; The Middle East; Arab World; West Asia	Usually large, round dough, about 2 feet in diameter, kept thin before baking; can be baked either in a clay oven or on a saj, a domed-convex metal griddle.
Marraqueta		Leavened, lobed loaf	Chile	Kneaded, made with flour, salt, water, and leavening.
Matzah		Flatbread	Levant (Jewish)	Unleavened. Used in Judaism, mainly during Passover. Made in 18 minutes to avoid rising. Consists of 2 ingredients: flour and water.
Melonpan		Sweet bun, Crispy	Japan	Made of enriched dough covered in thin layer of crispy cookie dough. Pineapple bun is a similar sweet bread from Hong Kong, and a Korean variation Soboro bread uses peanut butter in the top layer.
Miche		Leavened	France	Rounded loaf, often sourdough based.
Michetta		Leavened	Italy	Also known as rosetta, it has a hollow, bulging shape.
Milk roll		Leavened	United Kingdom	Soft white bread, sometimes baked in loaf tin with circular cross-section; recipe includes milk.
Mohnflesserl		White	Austria	Traditional Austrian pastry in the form of a braided bun, sometimes sprinkled with poppy seeds or salt, or glazed
Mollete		Flatbread, White	Spain (Andalusia)	A soft white bread, often served toasted with oil and garlic or lard.
Montreal-style bagel		Yeast bread	Canada	A bagel that is boiled in honey-sweetened water and then baked in a wood-fired oven. It is smaller and denser and uniquely incorporates egg and honey in the dough.
Msemmen	A platter of msamman served with jam, olive oil, honey, butter, and olives.	Flatbread	North Africa	Made of flour, durum wheat semolina, dry yeast, melted butter, salt, sugar and water.
Naan	Naan from a Pakistani restaurant	Flatbread	Central Asia, South Asia	Leavened bread, baked or fried
Ngome		Flatbread	Mali	Made of millet, water, and vegetable oil.
Obwarzanek krakowski		Yeast bread	Poland (Kraków)	A ring-shaped bread product made of strands of dough twisted into a spiral that is boiled and sprinkled with salt, poppy seeds, sesame seeds, etc., before being baked
Pa de pagès		Yeast bread	Catalonia	It is baked in a refractory oven, giving it a thick crust, which helps keep the inside fresh and soft for a long period of time. It has a round shape, and is usually sold in 250-gram, half-kilo, or two-kilo formats.
Pain de mie or pancarré		Yeast bread	France	Slightly sweet sandwich-style loaf with a dense crumb.
Pan marsellés		Yeast bread	Uruguay	A soft medium-sized white bread, lobed, with a hard crust dusted in cornmeal; somewhat similar to Italian bread
Pão Alentejano		Sourdough bread	Portugal	A crusty sourdough that is traditionally woodfired
Palianytsia		Yeast bread	Ukraine	Traditionally made with an incision at the top and baked in a hearth
Pambazo		Yeast bread	Mexico	A bread for making a sandwich of the same name.
Pan dulce		Sweet bread	Mexico	A bread that is one of the poster treats in Mexico and other Latin American countries.
Panbrioche		Leavened	Italy	A bread similar to brioche.
Pandesal		Sweet bread	Philippines	A rounded bread made of flour, eggs, yeast, sugar, and salt.
Pandoro		Yeast bread	Italy	Traditional sweet yeast loaf, most popular around Christmas and New Year, typically Veronese, usually shaped like a frustum with 8 pointed-star section, often served dusted with vanilla scented icing sugar made to resemble the snowy peaks of the Italian Alps in winter.
Pan de manteca		Buttered bread	Uruguay	
Pane carasau		Flatbread	Italy	Traditional flatbread, thin, crisp, usually in form of a dish half a meter wide, made by taking baked flatbread, splitting it in two sheets that are re-baked, recipe is ancient for shepherds who used to stay far from home for months, can last up to one year if kept dry.
Pane di Altamura		Leavened	Italy	Made from durum flour, often odd in shape.
Pane ticinese		Leavened, White	Switzerland	White, distinguished by its shape and softness, made of several small sub-loaves or rolls to be broken off by hand, with oil added to dough, which makes it soft.
Panettone		Sweet bread	Italy	Fluffy, base round, octagon or star section, takes days to make to cure acidic dough like sourdough, contains candied citrus, raisins, sliced vertically, served with cider or champagne, esp. for Christmas, New Year.
Panfocaccia		Leavened	Italy	A bread similar to focaccia.
Pão de queijo		Cassava flour	Brazil	A bread similar to chipá with cassava flour and cheese.
Pão de cará		wheat flour, eventually cará	Brazil	A bread named as immaterial cultural heritage of Santos.
Papadam or Papar		Flatbread	India Pakistan	Thin, crisp, and cracker-like, served with meal, as appetizer, as final item in meal, or as snack, eaten with various toppings: chopped onions, chutney, other dips and condiments.
Paratha		Flatbread	India (Northern); Pakistan; Bangladesh	Unleavened, made by pan frying whole wheat dough, ghee or cooking oil usually in dough and on done loaves, usually stuffed with vegetables or cheese, served with butter, chutney, spicy sauces or curries of meat and vegetables.
Parotta		Flatbread	India (Southern)	A common layered flatbread of South India. Also known as a barotta, this is not to be confused with the North Indian Paratha. Parottas are usually available in restaurants and road side shops across Kerala, Karnataka, Tamil Nadu and southern Coastal Andhra.
Paximathia		Dry bread	Greece	Also referred to as "rusks", it is prepared with whole wheat, chick pea, or barley flour, and is a common bread in Greece.
Peg bread		Leavened, lobed loaf	West Indies (especially Jamaica)	A bread similar to a bread roll
Penia		Sweet bread	Italy	Made from sugar, butter, eggs, anise seeds and lemons.
Pita		Flatbread	Near East; Greece; Cyprus	Called pitta in the UK. Round with inner pocket, as it cooks, steam puffs up dough, as it cools and flattens a pocket is left in the middle. A small version Khobz, is popular in Arab countries.
Piadina		Flatbread	Italy	Thin, usually made in Romagna region with white flour, lard or olive oil, salt, water, dough traditionally cooked on terra cotta dish, today flat pans or electric griddles are more common.
Pistolet		Leavened	Belgium	Round and small, traditionally filled with butter and jam for Sunday morning breakfast
Pogača		Flatbread	Balkans; Turkey	Generally made from wheat flour, but barley and sometimes rye may be added. Can be stuffed with potatoes, ground beef, or cheese, and have grains and herbs like sesame, black sesame, dried dill in the dough or sprinkled on top.
Porteño		Leavened	Uruguay	Wheat, leavened, cut, similar to pan flauta.
Portuguese sweet bread		Sweet bread	Portugal	Round, made with milk, sugar or honey, subtly sweet lightly textured loaf, traditionally made for Christmas and Easter times (with hard boiled eggs often baked in), today made year round.
Potato bread		Leavened or unleavened	United States; Lithuania; Latvia	Potato replaces part of usual wheat flour, ratio of potato to wheat varies much, leavened or unleavened, may have many other ingredients baked in, varied cooking methods.
Potbrood		Leavened	South Africa	Produced in a cast-iron pot covered with wood coals, there are a wide range of flavors but is often made with wheat flour and sweetcorn.
Pretzel		Yeast bread	Germany	Alemannic knot-shaped lye roll, sometimes soft, sometimes hard, sometimes sweet, sometimes salty.
Proja		Cornbread	Croatia; Serbia	Small muffins or loaves of cornbread, was popular in times of widespread poverty, now is a common everyday meal.
Proziaki		Soda bread	Poland (Subcarpathian Voivodeship)	Bread made from wheat flour, eggs, water, salt, milk or kefir, and baking soda (locally called proza, from which the bread takes its name). Traditionally, they were baked on cast-iron griddles, but today a regular frying pan is typically used. Proziaki are usually cut into small, thick rectangles and eaten either plain or with butter or lard.
Pumpernickel		Rye	Germany	Very heavy, dense, slightly sweet dark pure rye traditionally made with coarsely ground flour; now often made with mixed flour and whole grain berries.
Pumpkin bread		Quick bread	United States (Native American)	A type of moist quick bread made with pumpkin. The pumpkin can be cooked and softened before being used or simply baked with the bread; using canned pumpkin renders it a simpler dish to prepare. Additional ingredients include nuts (such as walnuts).
Puran Poli, also called Obbatu, Bobbatlu, Bakshalu		Flatbread	India	Sweet dessert served for special occasions and festivals, stuffing of boiled chickpea lentils, turmeric, sugar, jaggery and spices, cooked on hot griddle, served with milk or ghee and lentil broth soup.
Qistibi		Flatbread	Russia (Tatarstan and Bashkortostan)	Roasted flatbreads with various fillings inside. The dough should be non-fermented. The most popular filling is mashed potato, but it may also be ragout or millet. Filling is placed on the one half of the flatbread and is covered by the other half. Later, clarified butter is spread on the flatbreads.
Quick bread		Leavened	United States	Leavened with a substance other than yeast.
Rewena bread		Sourdough	New Zealand	A round loaf made with a potato-based sourdough culture.
Rieska		Flatbread	Finland	Unleavened, commonly made from barley or potato.
Röggelchen		Rye	Germany (Rhineland) Eastern Belgium	Small pastry in the form of a double roll made from two pieces of dough, the content of which is at least 50% rye.
Roti		Flatbread	India Pakistan Bangladesh	Unleavened, made from stone ground wholemeal flour, traditionally named atta flour.
Roti bolen		Sweet bread	Indonesia	Made of baked flour with butter or margarine layers, filled with cheese, durian or banana.
Roti buaya		Sweet bread	Indonesia	Crocodile-shaped bread made of yam or cassava, traditionally served in Batavian wedding.
Roti canai		Flatbread	Indonesia; Malaysia; Singapore; Thailand	Flatbread dish served with curry. Of South Indian origin, it is popular in various Southeast Asian countries. This bread which is made of dough is usually composed of fat (usually ghee), flour and water; some recipes also include sweetened condensed milk.
Rugbrød		Sourdough	Denmark	Made of rye and wheat flour or up to 1/3 whole rye grains may have whole seeds, usual sourdough base, low fat, no oil or flavoring but salt, high fiber, little or no sugar, usually long brown rectangle.
Rumali Roti		Flatbread	India (Northern) Pakistan	Rumali in Hindustani means handkerchief or napkin. This flatbread is thin and soft like a handkerchief. It is made with maida flour (highly refined wheat flour).
Ryaninjun		Leavened	United States (New England)	Brown bread made from rye flour and cornmeal and baked on oak or cabbage leaves, made by the Puritans in New England during the seventeenth and eighteenth centuries. The name is derived from "rye and Indian".
Rye bread		Leavened	Europe	Made of various fractions of rye grain flour, color light to dark via flour used and if colors added, usually denser and higher fiber than many common breads, darker color, stronger flavor. Jewish rye bread is popular in Ashkenazi Jewish cuisine, and topped with caraway. In Germany, breads with a mixture of rye and other grains is a Mischbrot.
Sacramental bread		Crispy bread	Greece; Italy (Rome)	Ceremonial bread used in the Christian Eucharist ritual.
Saj bread		Unleavened	Middle East, Turkey, Armenia	Daily staple in many Middle Eastern countries, especially in Lebanon
Samoon		Yeast bread	Iraq	It is baked in traditional stone ovens, like pizza. Usually served with a variety of foods such as hummus, kebab, shawarma.
Salt-rising bread		Leavened	United States	Made of wheat flour, starter of liquid (water or milk), either corn, potatoes, or wheat, and some other minor ingredients; result has dense crumb and positive cheese-like flavor.
Sandwich roll		Yeast bread	Mexico	A soft, white bread generally used for making sandwiches called tortas.
Sangak		Sourdough	Iran	Plain, rectangular, or triangular, whole wheat sourdough, usually two types: generic no toppings and costlier topped with poppy or sesame seeds.
Scallion bread		Scallion bread	Taiwan	Characterised by its green onion topping and use of traditional lard, this bread has a soft, fluffy texture and a distinctive aroma.
Scone		Quick bread	Scotland	Small quick bread usually made of wheat, barley or oatmeal, baking powder leavening.
Sgabeo		Leavened	Italy (Lunigiana)	Cut into strips, fried and salted.
Shaobing		Layered flatbread	China	Thick, baked, layered flatbread which may have sweet or savory filling.
Shirmal		Flatbread	India; Iran Pakistan	Saffron-flavored traditional flatbread, usually made with milk instead of water.
Shokupan		Yeast bread	Japan	A soft white milk bread made with a tangzhong and commonly found in Asian bakeries.
Shotis puri		Yeast bread	Georgia	Made of white flour and shaped like a canoe rowboat baked in tandoor.
Shuangbaotai		Dough bread	Taiwan	Chewy fried dough bread containing large air pockets on the inside and a crisp crust on the outside. It is made by twisting two small pieces of dough together and frying them, causing them to separate slightly while remaining connected.
Soda bread		Soda bread	Ireland	A variety of quick bread traditionally made in a variety of cuisines in which sodium bicarbonate (otherwise known as baking soda) is used as a raising agent rather than the more common yeast. The ingredients of traditional soda bread are flour, bread soda, salt, and buttermilk. The buttermilk in the dough contains lactic acid, which reacts with the baking soda to form tiny bubbles of carbon dioxide. Other ingredients can be added such as raisins, egg or various nuts.
Sopa		Maize flour and cheese bread	Paraguay	Maize flour, cheese, eggs, lard.
Sopapilla		Deep fried pumpkin bread	Chile	Pumpkin, wheat flour and lard
Sourdough bread		Sourdough	Fertile Crescent	A bread product made by a long fermentation of dough using naturally occurring lactobacilli and yeasts. In comparison with breads made quickly with cultivated yeast, it usually has a mildly sour taste because of the lactic acid produced by the lactobacilli.
Spelt bread		Yeast bread	Georgia; Armenia	Made mainly with spelt flour or coarse meal.
Sprouted bread		Sprouted	Isle of Man	A type of bread made from sprouted (germinated) whole grains
Taboon bread or Laffa		Flatbread	Turkey	Taboon is a wrap used in many cuisines. This type of flatbread is traditionally baked in a Tabun oven and eaten with different fillings.
Taftan		Leavened	Iran	Leavened flour bread with saffron and small amount of cardamom powder baked in a clay oven.
Tandoor bread		Flatbread	South Asia; Central Asia; Western Asia; East Africa	A type of bread baked in a clay oven that is called a tandoor.
Teacake		Sweet bun	United Kingdom (England)	Fruited sweet bun usually served toasted and buttered.
Thengai Bun		Stuffed Bun	Southern India (Tamil Nadu)	Sweet bun stuffed with coconut shredding, Tutti fruiti, Cardamom and sugar. Thengai bun is also known as Dilkush and Dilpasand. Its mostly in Tamil Nadu but is also found in Karnataka, Kerala and Andhra Pradesh
Texas toast		Yeast bread	United States (Texas)	A type of packaged white bread (not sold toasted as the name implies) which is sold sliced at double the typical thickness of most sliced breads. While it can be used in the same manner as ordinary bread slices such as in sandwiches, it is especially useful for dishes involving liquids, such as barbecue sauce, or where extra thickness can improve the product, such as French toast.
Tiger bread		Rice bread	Netherlands	Rice paste bread made with sesame oil and with a pattern baked into the top made by painting rice paste onto the surface prior to baking. The paste dries and cracks during the baking process, creating a two-colour effect similar to a tiger's markings, hence the name.
Tonis puri		Flatbread	Georgia	Made of white flour and baked in tandoor.
Torta frita		White flour, lard, flatbread, fried	Argentina, Uruguay	Leavened flatbread deep fried in lard. Similar to sopaipilla
Tortilla		Flatbread	Mexico; Guatemala	Thin flatbread made from finely ground wheat flour. Originally derived from the corn tortilla (tortilla in Spanish means "small torta", or "small cake"), a bread of maize which predates the arrival of Europeans to the Americas, the wheat flour tortilla was an innovation after wheat was brought to the New World from Spain while this region was the colony of New Spain. It is made with an unleavened, water based dough, pressed and cooked like corn tortillas.
Tsoureki		Leavened	Greece	Sweet bread formed of braided strands of dough; may also be savory.
Ttongppang		Pancake	South Korea	Korean bread sold at street markets. It is filled with red bean paste with walnut kernel and sold for about ₩1,000.
Tunnbröd		Flatbread	Sweden	Soft (used as wrap for other food), or crisp (used with fermented herring), many variants depending on type of grain (any mix of wheat, barley, rye), leavening agent (or lack), and rolling pin.
Uttapam		Pancake	India (Southern)	Fermented crêpe or pancake made from rice batter and black lentils garnished with onion, chilli, capsicum, coriander, tomato and cheese. It is served with chutney or sambar
Vánočka		Leavened	Czech Republic, Slovakia	Baked traditionally at Christmastime. It is rich in eggs and butter, making it similar to brioche. Lemon rind and nutmeg add color and flavor; the dough can also contain raisins and almonds, and is braided like challah.
Vienna bread		Leavened	Austria (Vienna)	Produced from a process using high milling of Hungarian grain, cereal press-yeast for leavening.
Wagafi bread		Flatbread	Iraq, Iran	A flat, thin bread.
White bread		White	Global	Made from wheat flour from which the bran and the germ have been removed through a process known as milling.
Whole wheat bread		Leavened	Europe	Made using flour which is partly or entirely made from whole or almost whole wheat grains. An Estonian version is the Sepik.
Wotou/wowotou		Steamed	China	Cone-shaped steamed bread made from cornmeal, originating in northern China.
Yufka		Flatbread	Turkey	Thin, round, unleavened, similar to lavash, about 18 inches (46 cm) in diameter, usually made of wheat flour, water, table salt. The lower the moisture content, the longer the shelf life. Not to be confused with yufka meaning filo.
Zopf		Leavened, White	Switzerland; Liechtenstein; Germany; Austria	Made of white flour, milk, egg, butter, yeast, dough is braided, brushed with egg yolk before baking, forming a gold crust.
Zucchini bread		Quick bread	United States	Made using shredded, grated, or blended zucchini.
Zwieback		Crispy sweet bread	Germany	Crisp, sweetened bread, made with eggs and baked twice. It is sliced before it is baked a second time, which produces crisp, brittle slices that closely resemble melba toast.

== See also ==
- List of American breads
- List of British breads
- List of French breads
- List of Indian breads
- List of Swiss breads
- List of Uruguayan breads

- List of baked goods
- List of brand name breads
- List of bread dishes
- List of bread rolls
- List of sourdough breads
- List of buns
- List of cakes
- List of cookies
- List of pancakes
- List of pastries
- List of pies, tarts and flans
- List of puddings
- List of quick breads
- List of sandwiches
- List of sweet breads
- List of toast dishes
