= Milk bread =

Milk bread may refer to:

- Japanese milk bread
- Milk roll
- Milk toast

== See also ==
- List of breads
