= Sepik (disambiguation) =

Sepik may refer to places in Papua New Guinea:

- Sepik River
- East Sepik - a province
- Sandaun - a province formerly known as West Sepik
- Sepik region - consisting of East Sepik and Sandaun provinces

In languages it may refer to:

- Sepik languages - a proposed language family

And to:

- Sepik – a traditional Estonian whole wheat bread.
