= Crispy pancakes =

Crispy pancakes may refer to:

- Khanom bueang, a Thai dish often sold by street vendors, called "crispy pancakes" in English
- Crispy Pancakes (brand), the brand name of a product from the Findus company
