= Isfahan beryan =

Iranian traditional dish

Beryan
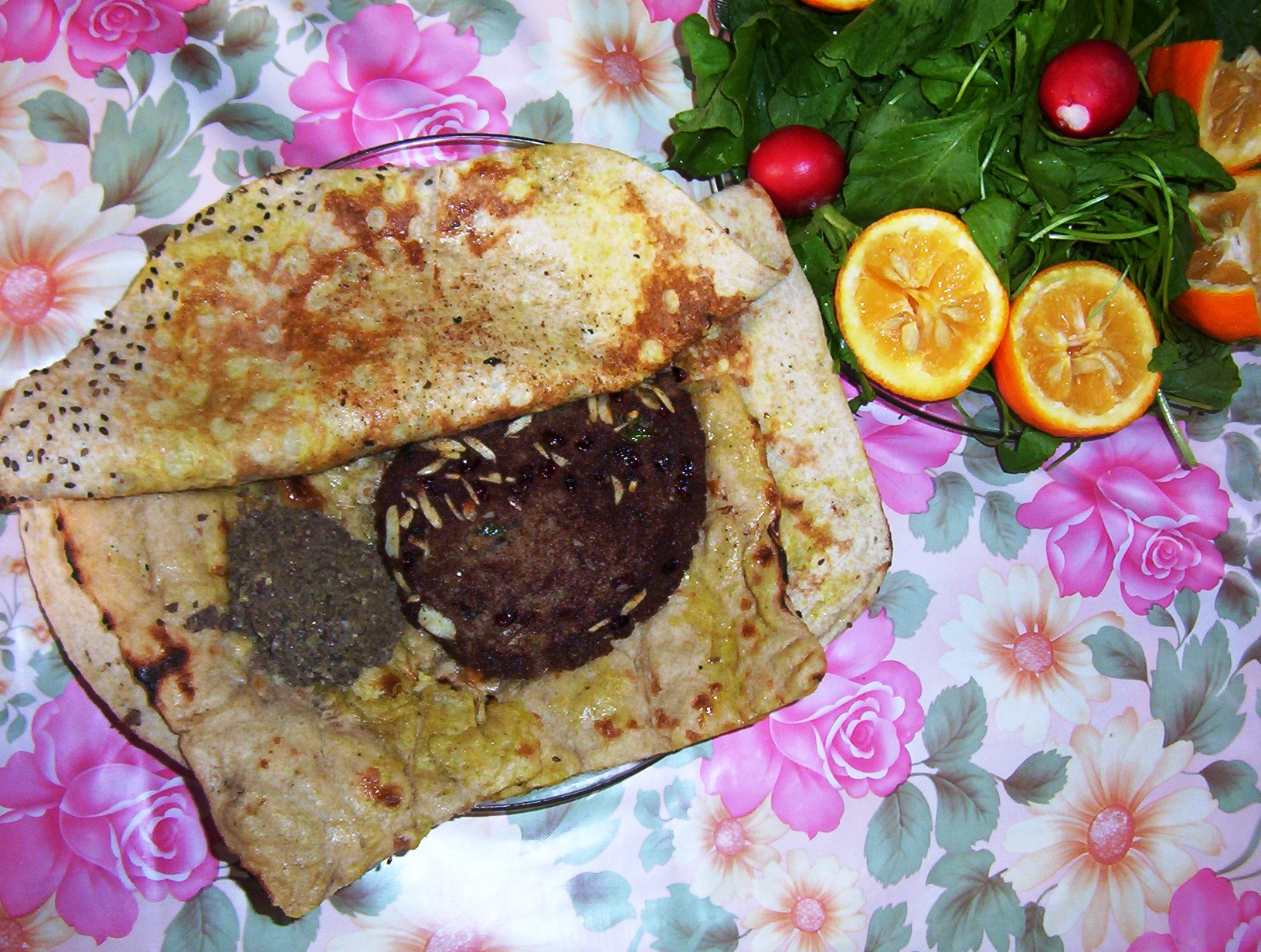
- Alternative names: Isfahan beryani, beryan, beryuni
- Course: Lunch
- Place of origin: Iran
- Region or state: Isfahan
- Main ingredients: shoulder and rack of lamb and mutton, tail fat, sheep lungs, sangak, onions cinnamon, brewed saffron, walnuts, pistachio, almond, turmeric, dried mint leaves, salt and pepper

Isfahan beryan (بریان اصفهان) is one of the traditional dishes of Isfahan, Iran, fried meat served on a piece of bread (usually sangak) with onion and greens on the side.

It is cooked and sold in unique restaurants (beryanis), and is not usually served along with other foods; locals call it "beryun" (بریون).

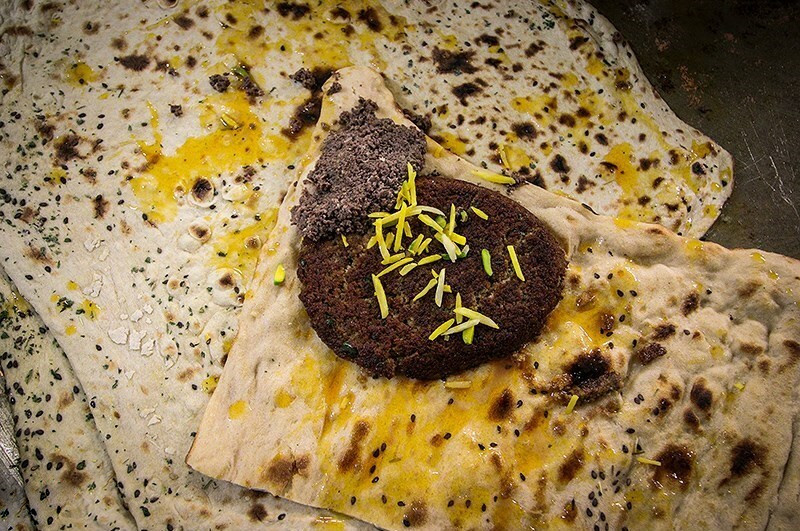
Isfahan Biryani decorated with sliced almonds

Jean-Baptiste Tavernier has written about this food in his own journal. Jean Chardin has written two accounts about beryani. Abbas the Great's Noorullah, the personal chef, has also provided a recipe.
