= Ngome =

Ngome may mean:

- Ngome (bread), a flatbread of Mali
- Ngome, KwaZulu-Natal, a location near Nongoma, KwaZulu-Natal, South Africa
- Ngome Forest, forest near Nongoma, KwaZulu-Natal, South Africa
- Ngome Marian Shrine, a Marian apparition site near Nongoma
- Ngome Kongwe (Old Fort), a fort on Zanzibar in Tanzania
- Ahmed bin Shekhe Ngome, Sultan of Bambao 4 times in the 19th century
