= List of Uruguayan breads =

This is a comprehensive list of types of breads of Uruguay:

Pan marsellés

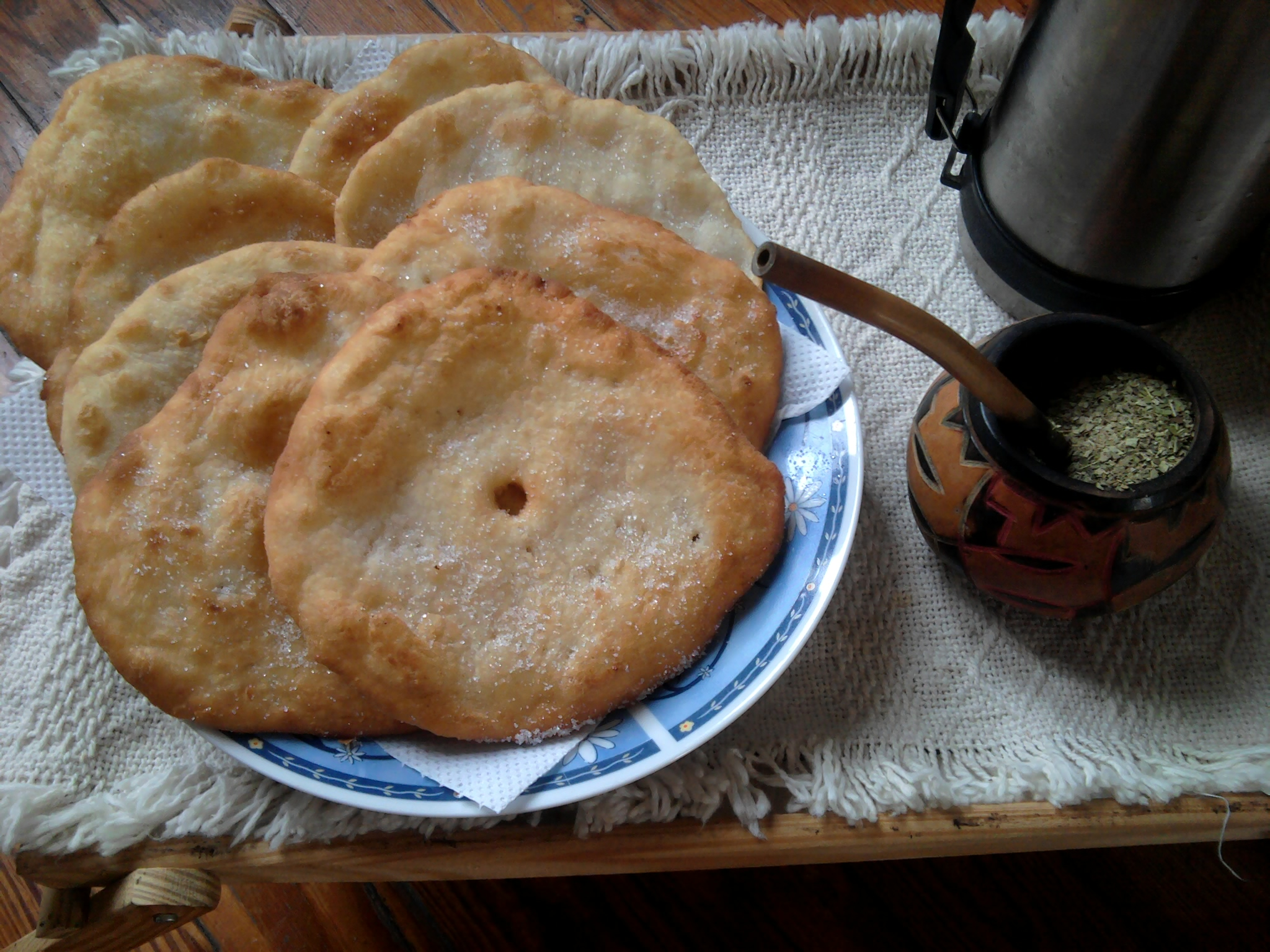
Torta frita

- Cuernitos
- Galleta de campaña
- Galleta dulce
- Medialuna
- Pan catalán
- Pan flauta
- Pan felipe
- Pan porteño
- Pan marsellés
- Pan tortuga
- Pan de molde de sándwiches
- Pan de rosca
- Pan de rosca de chicharrones
- Pan de viena
- Pebete
- Roseta
- Torta frita

== See also ==
- List of breads
- Pan dulce
