= Baba (bread) =

Type of bread made by the Naxi people of Yunnan, China

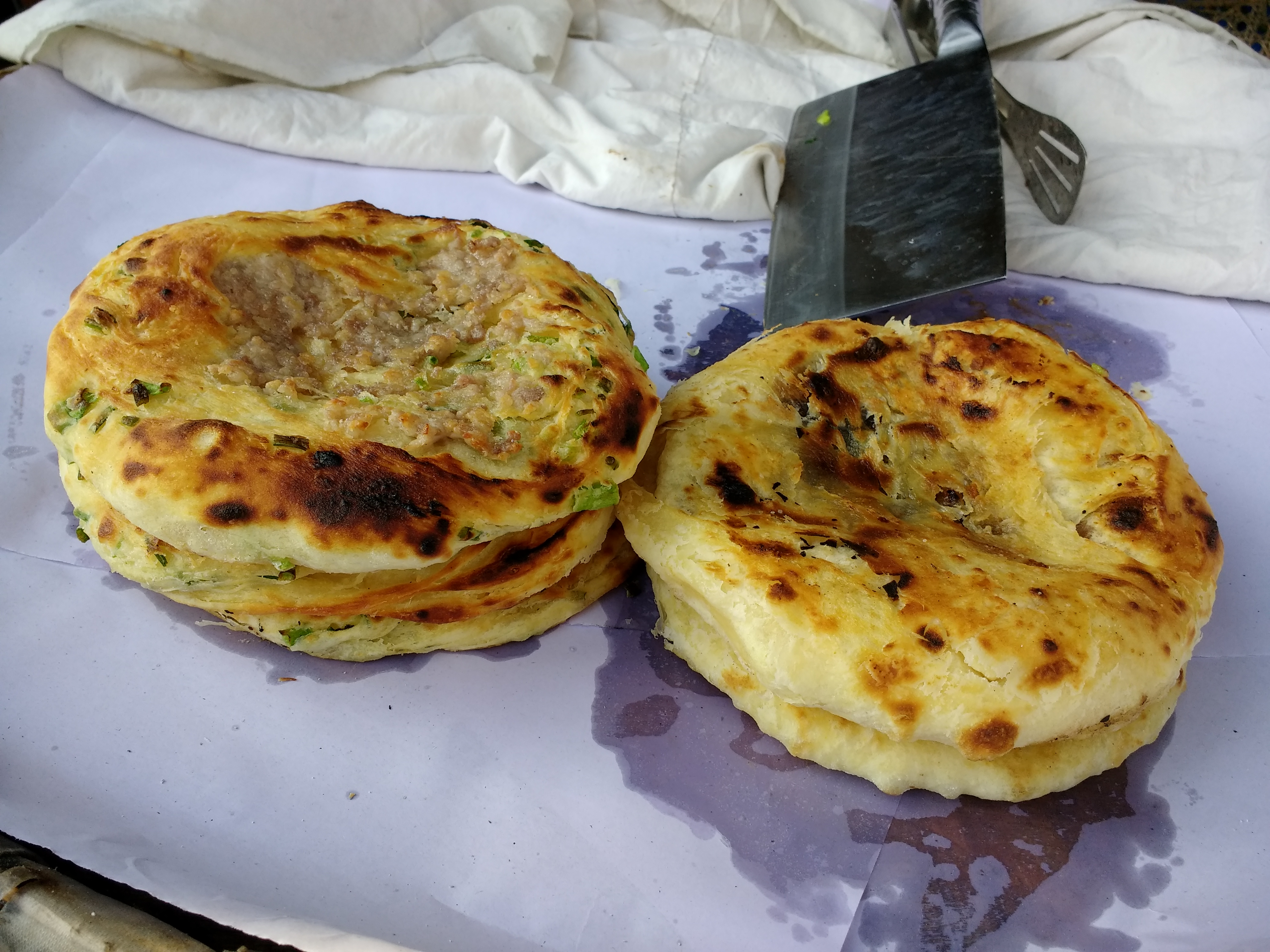
- Baba in Xizhou
- Type: Bread
- Region or state: Yunnan Province, China

Baba (Chinese: 粑粑, pinyin: Bābā) is a type of thick, round, heavy bread that is prepared either plain or with various fillings by the Naxi people of north-western Yunnan, China. It can be sweet or savory.

Sometimes marketed to tourists as "Chinese pizza," it is said to have been invented during the Qing Dynasty and can vary greatly from one part of Yunnan to another. Because of its versatility, baba can be eaten plain, cut into pieces, and turned into a spicy snack or as a popular street food, particularly for breakfast.

== See also ==
- List of breads
