= Dumb bread =

Bread from United States Virgin Islands

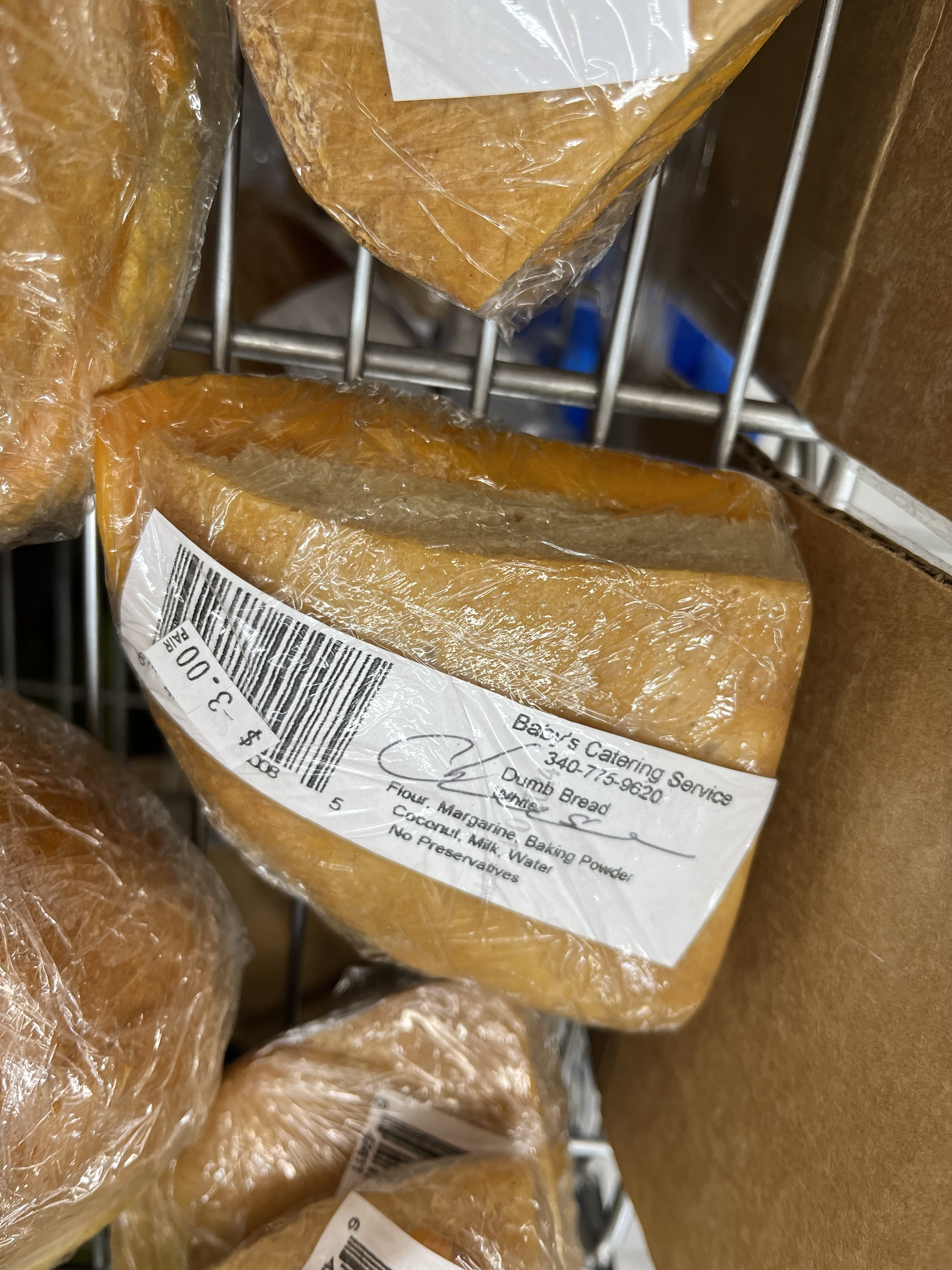
- Dumb bread
- Type: Bread
- Place of origin: Virgin Islands
- Serving temperature: Room temperature
- Main ingredients: Flour, water, butter, salt, sugar, baking powder, milk, often shredded coconut

Dumb bread is a traditional bread that originates from the Virgin Islands. The name comes from the cooking technique dum pukht, which originated from India and was brought to the Caribbean when the Indian indentured workers replaced the slaves.

This bread does not require any yeast. Ingredients include flour, water, butter, sugar, baking powder, salt, and milk; ofttimes, shredded coconut is also added to the dough. Sometimes, cornmeal may be used. The same dough can be used to make johnnycakes. The bread can be filled with cheddar cheese. It is served cut into triangles and often along with bush tea or coffee.

On Annaberg in Saint John, the docents will sometimes act as bakers and make dumb bread.

== Preparation ==
The dough is first made with the dry ingredients combined with butter then milk with shredded coconut being optionally added. The dough is then kneaded and formed into a round loaf. The dough is then allowed to rest. It is then cooked in a skillet or dutch oven over hot coals with additional hot coals on top of the skillet lid to cook the bread from above and below. The bread is cooked until golden brown and sounding hollow when tapped. The bread requires a resting period after baking or it will be damp and doughy on the inside.

== See also ==
- List of breads
