= Wagafi bread =

Iranian flatbread

- Type: Bread
- Place of origin: Iran
- Region or state: Southern regions of Iran
- Serving temperature: with hummus
- Main ingredients: Flour
- Food energy (per serving): 150 kcal (630 kJ)

Wagafi bread (in Arabic often referred to as white bread) is an Iranian type of bread that normally contains a greater amount of flour than normal bread. It is a flat, thin bread. The bread is made in a hole called a tannour.

== See also ==
- List of breads
