= Taftan (bread) =

Leavened bread from Iran

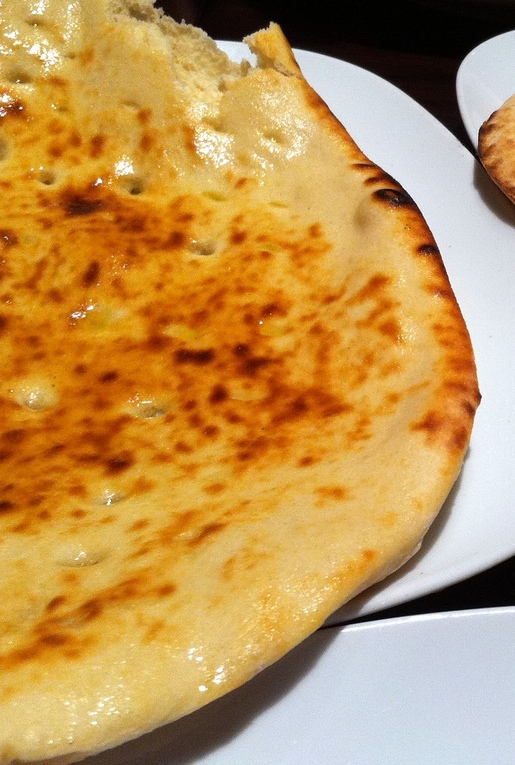
- Alternative names: Taftoon
- Type: Bread
- Place of origin: Iran
- Main ingredients: Flour, saffron, cardamom

Taftan or taftoon (Persian: تافتان) is a leavened flour bread originating from Iran, introduced to Kuwaiti and South Asian cuisines. It is made with refined flour, milk, yoghurt, and eggs and baked in a clay oven. It is sometimes flavoured with saffron and a small amount of cardamom powder, and may be decorated with seeds such as poppy seeds.

== See also ==
- Barbari bread
- Lavash, an unleavened flatbread
- Pita
- Samoon
- Sangak, a leavened flatbread found in Iran
- Sheermal, similar to taftan, often with added fruits and murabba
