= Khauk mont =

Folded crepe with coconut shavings

Bein mont
- Type: Snack (mont)
- Place of origin: Myanmar (Burma)
- Region or state: Southeast Asia
- Associated cuisine: Burmese
- Main ingredients: rice flour, jaggery, coconut shavings
- Similar dishes: Khanom bueang

Khauk mont (Burmese: ခေါက်မုန့်; pronounced [kʰaʊʔ mo̰ʊɴ], lit. 'folded cake') is a traditional Burmese snack or mont.

This snack is a thin and crispy folded crepe made with a batter of rice flour and jaggery, and filled with fresh coconut shavings, and optionally with other fillings like red bean. similar to Thai khanom bueang.
