= Barbari bread =

Iranian flatbread

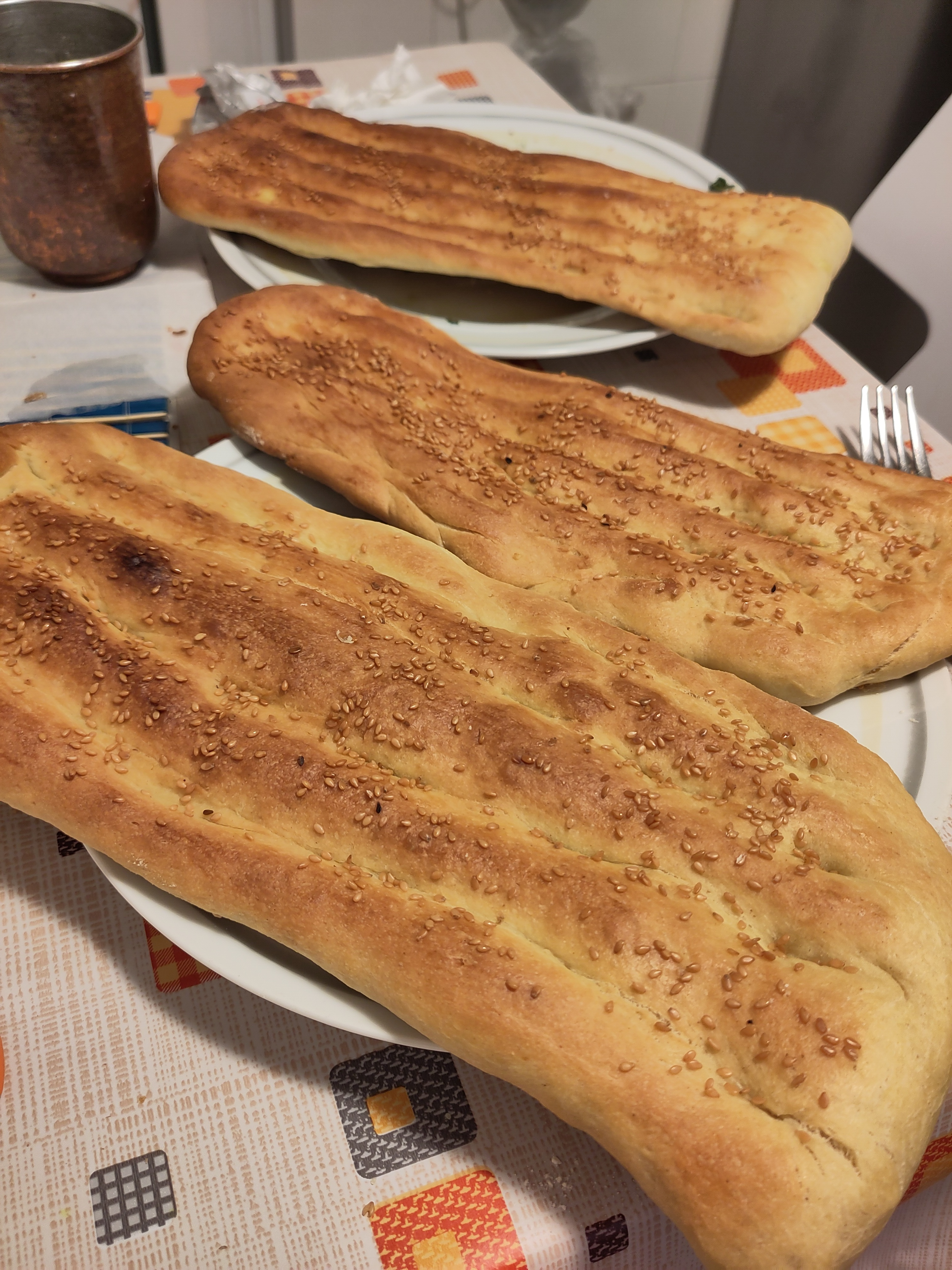
- Place of origin: Iran via Hazaras
- Region or state: Razavi Khorasan
- Main ingredients: Wheat flour

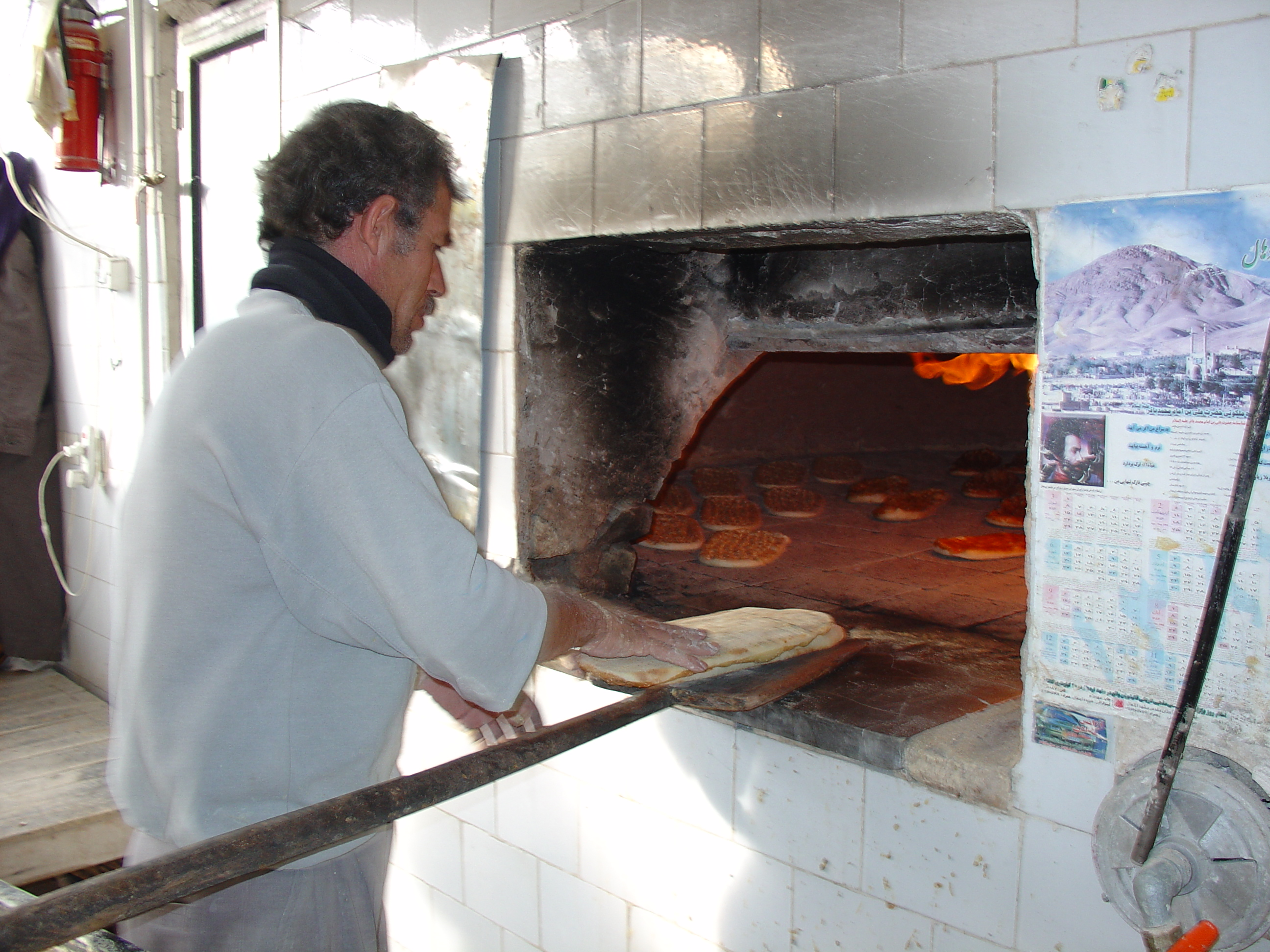
Baker baking Barbari bread in a traditional oven

Barbari bread (Persian: نان بربری, romanized: nân-e barbari) is a type of Iranian yeast leavened flatbread. It is one of the thickest flat breads and is commonly topped with sesame or black caraway seeds. A notable characteristic of the bread is its top skin that is similar to pretzels or lye roll's skin due to the Maillard reaction that occurs during baking. Before baking it is glazed with a mixture of flour and water. It is widely known as Persian flatbread in United States and Canada.

== Etymology ==
Barbari bread traces back to the Qajar era. It takes its name from a community known as the Barbars, a pejorative term ascribed to Hazaras who migrated to Tehran from central Afghanistan during the 19th century.

During the Qajar dynasty, numerous Hazaras immigrated to Khorasan province. The Hazaras of Khorasan province were known by the name Barbar until the Pahlavi period. While the term "Barbari" for this tribe was replaced by "Khavari" by royal edict of Mohammad Reza Pahlavi, the bread itself kept its title and is now commonly known as "nān-e barbari" in Iran.

The bread is still referred to as nān-e barbari in Iran while Hazaras refer to it as nān-e tanūri ("tandoor [tandir] bread").

== Manufacture and style ==
The bread is usually 70 cm to 80 cm long, and 25 cm to 30 cm wide. It is the most common style baked in Iran. It is served in many restaurants with Lighvan cheese, a ewe's milk cheese similar to feta cheese.

== See also ==
- Naan
- Taftan, Iranian bread
- Sangak, a leavened Iranian flatbread
- Lavash, an unleavened Armenian flatbread popular in Iran
