= Milk roll =

Type of enriched bread

Milk Roll
- Alternative names: Milk bread; Blackpool milk roll; Blackpool roll; Lodger's loaf
- Type: Bread
- Place of origin: Blackpool
- Region or state: England
- Invented: 1862
- Main ingredients: Wheat flour, Milk
- Food energy (per slice serving): 46 kcal (190 kJ)

Milk roll or Blackpool roll is a soft, round type of British bread traditionally associated with the town of Blackpool, Lancashire. It is made using milk instead of water, as well as white flour, yeast, and sugar.

Milk roll is soft and light-textured, with a soft crust. The loaf is approximately 7 inches (180 mm) in diameter and approximately 14 ounces (400 g) in weight.

== Shape and structure ==
Milk rolls are baked in a two-part cylindrical mould with ridges to indicate slice-cutting positions. Warburtons bakery distributes a pre-sliced version nationwide. The soft crust is caused by steam being trapped within the mould and because no surface is directly exposed and it is steam-cooked, the crust is unusually soft.

== See also ==
- Japanese milk bread
- List of breads
