= Chickpea bread =

Type of bread made from chickpea flour from Albania and Turkey

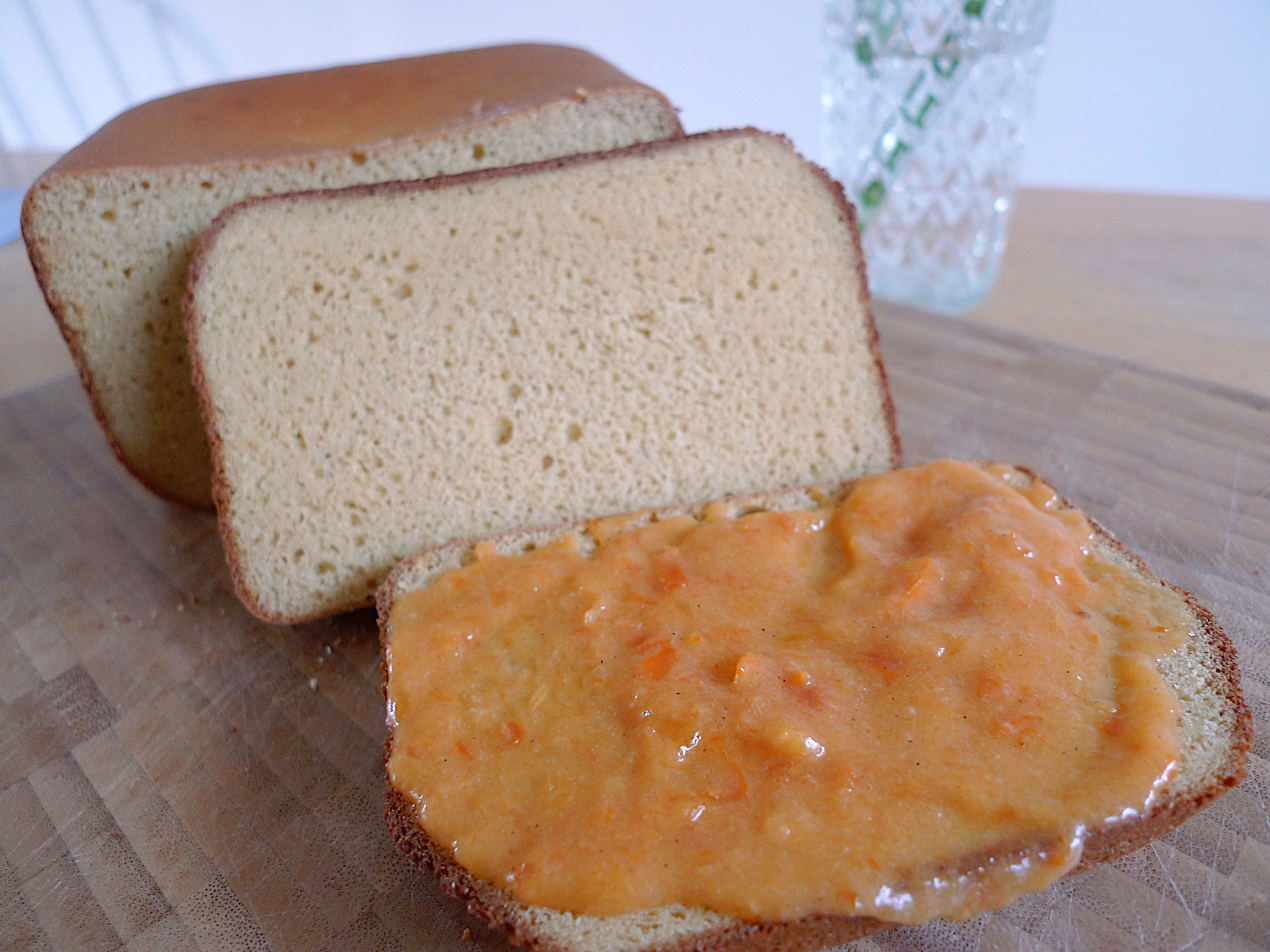
- Type: Bread
- Place of origin: Albania, Turkey
- Main ingredients: Chickpea

Chickpea bread (Turkish: Nohut ekmeği) is a type of bread made from chickpea flour from Turkey. Notably, instead of regular yeast, a yeast found on chickpeas is used; this yeast is mixed with flour and water and left out overnight in a warm place. The next day, the dough is cut into pieces, placed on a tray and baked. In Albania it is baked as dinner rolls.

== See also ==
- Farinata
