= Sangak =

Iranian whole wheat leavened flatbread

- Alternative names: Nân-e Sangak
- Type: Flatbread
- Place of origin: Iran
- Region or state: Khorasan
- Main ingredients: Wheat flour, Sour dough, Sesame
- Food energy (per serving): 75 kcal (310 kJ)
- Other information: National bread of Iran

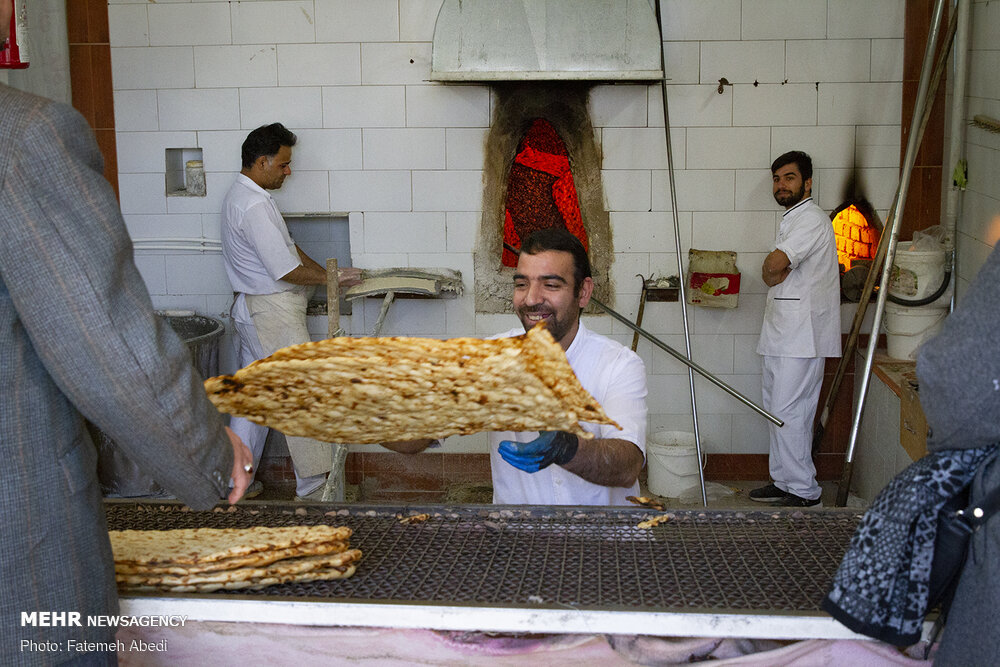
Two bakers baking sangak in a traditional oven

Baking sangak in Isfahan

Sangak (Persian: سَنگَگ) or Nân-e Sangak (Persian: نانِ سَنگَگ) is a triangular traditional Iranian whole wheat leavened flatbread.

== History ==
In Persian, sangak means "pebble". The bread is baked on a bed of small river stones in an oven. There are usually two varieties of this bread offered at Iranian bakeries: one that has no toppings; and a more expensive variety traditionally topped with poppy seeds or sesame seeds, or, more rarely, with cumin, black cumin, caraway or even dried aromatic herbs.

Sangak bread was traditionally the bread of the Persian army. It is mentioned for the first time in the 11th century. Each soldier carried a small quantity of pebbles which at camp were brought together to create the "Sangak oven" that would bake the bread for the entire army. It was traditionally eaten with Persian lamb kabob in the army.

The bread has also been widely eaten in the territory of present-day Azerbaijan, a former province of Iran, but following the Soviet takeover in 1920, it has become less common in Azerbaijan. The Soviets mandated centralized, industrial mass-production of bread, a modernization which was not amenable to traditional, hand-formed Sangak.

== Preparation ==
Sangak is always made from a very high-hydration dough. After the dough is prepared, usually with a large mixing machine, quantities of the sticky dough are scooped up by the baker and spread into a rough triangle on an oiled metal bread peel. The baker then applies toppings if any are used. The peels used for sangak have very long handles, sometimes almost 3 meters (10 ft). The baker uses this handle to tip the formed dough onto a large tray that often rotates within the oven, which is usually gas-fired. This tray is covered with smooth river stones, which give sangak its characteristic corrugated texture and combination of thick, chewy regions separated by thin and crispy borders.

The baker must carefully allow the formed dough to slide off the oiled peel while at the same time using the peel to stretch the dough over the stones as much as possible. A triangle of formed dough may be nearly equilateral when it is arranged on the peel but is stretched into a tall isosceles triangle when it is poured onto the hot stones. This action requires a great deal of experience and some bakeries advertise the skill of their bakers by claiming to have the longest sangak in their city or region.

After the bread has completed roughly 3/4 of a circuit through the oven, it is removed with a three-pronged hook on a long pole. In bakeries that use rotating ovens, this is often accomplished through a separate portal than that used to lay the dough on the stones. The bread is then sometimes folded in half but always thrown onto a wide-gauge metal meshwork. The hot bread is thrown down with some force to dislodge any small pebbles that may have become attached during baking. It then cools for a time on this meshwork. The bread is then hung from nails on the bakery's walls or bought fresh off the grate by patrons as soon at it can be handled.

== Gallery ==
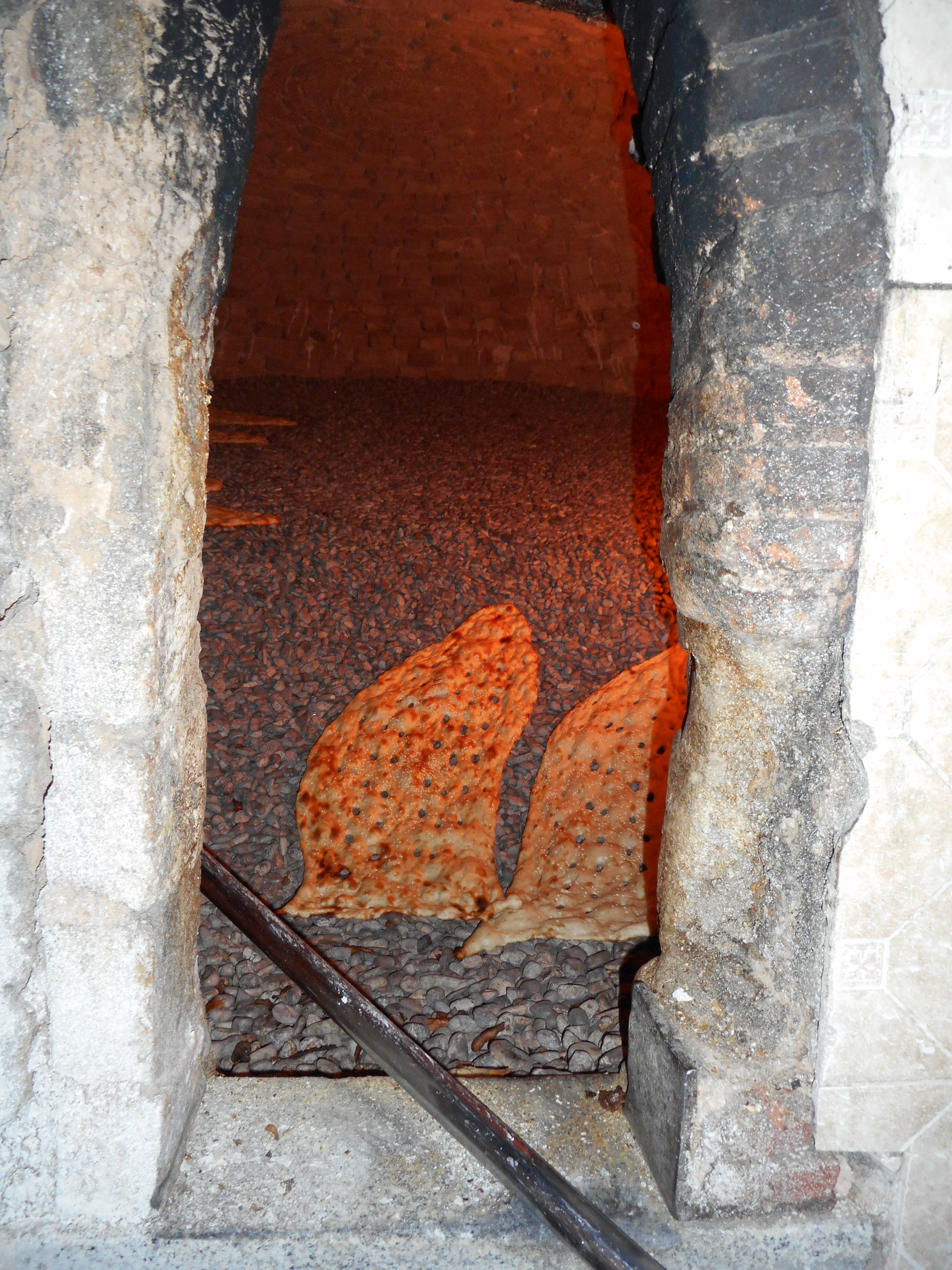
Sangak inside the oven.

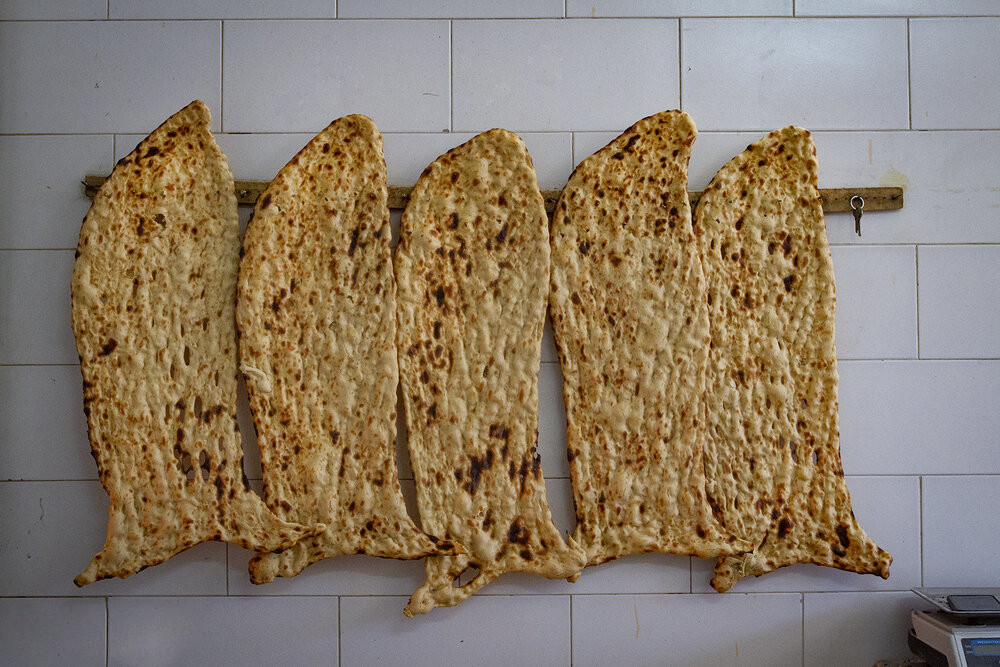
When the hot bread comes out of the oven (tandoor), it is hung on the wall to cool.

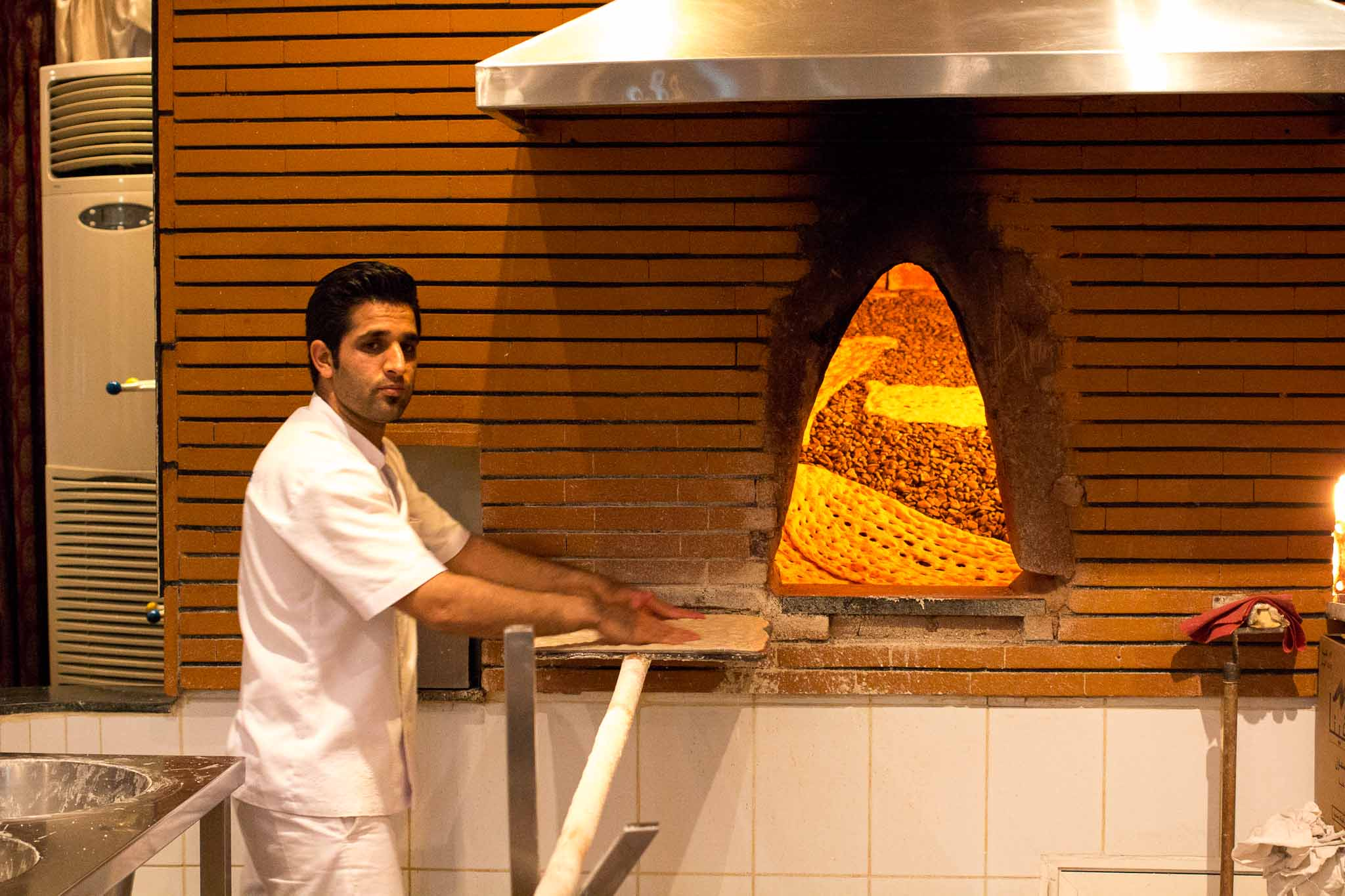
Inside the bakery.

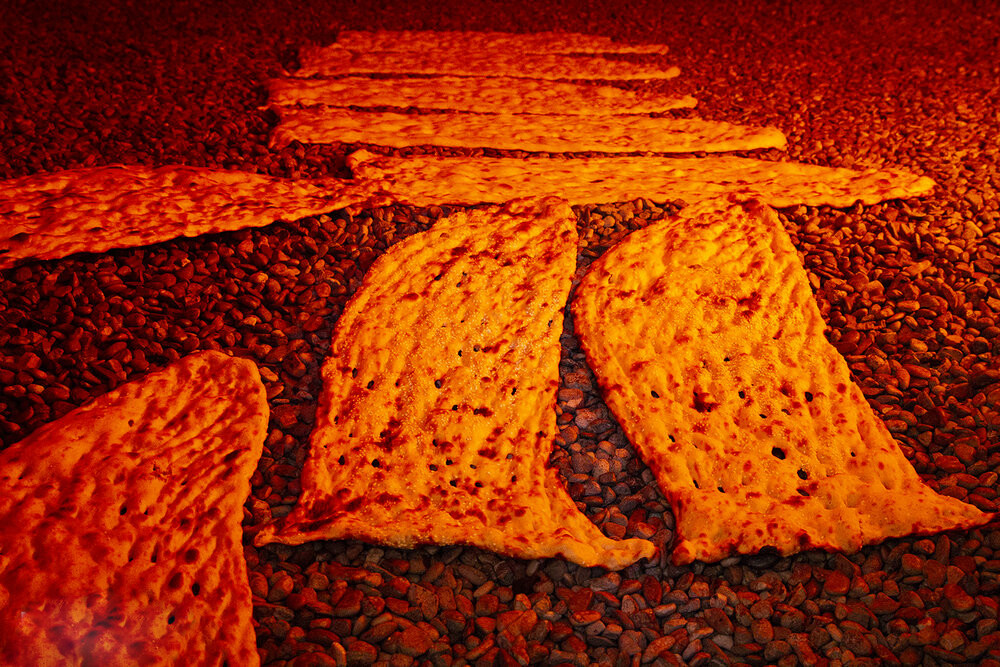
Sangak bread must be baked on smooth pebbles.

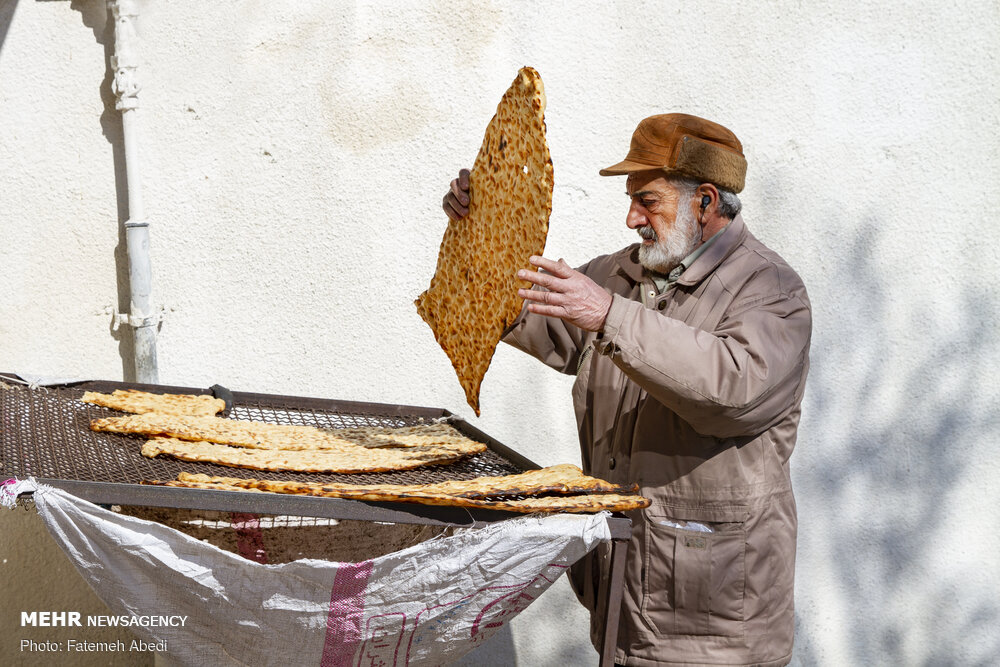
Bringing sangak from the oven to the cooling grates.

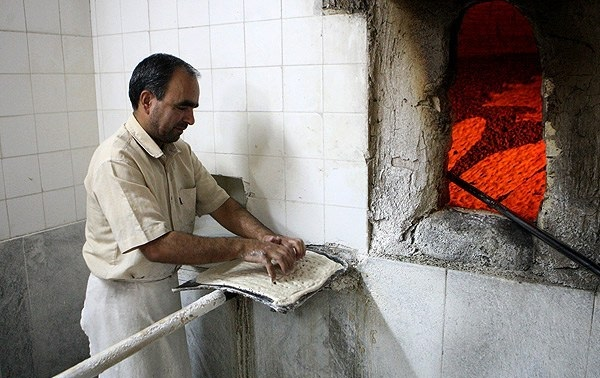
View from inside a bakery.

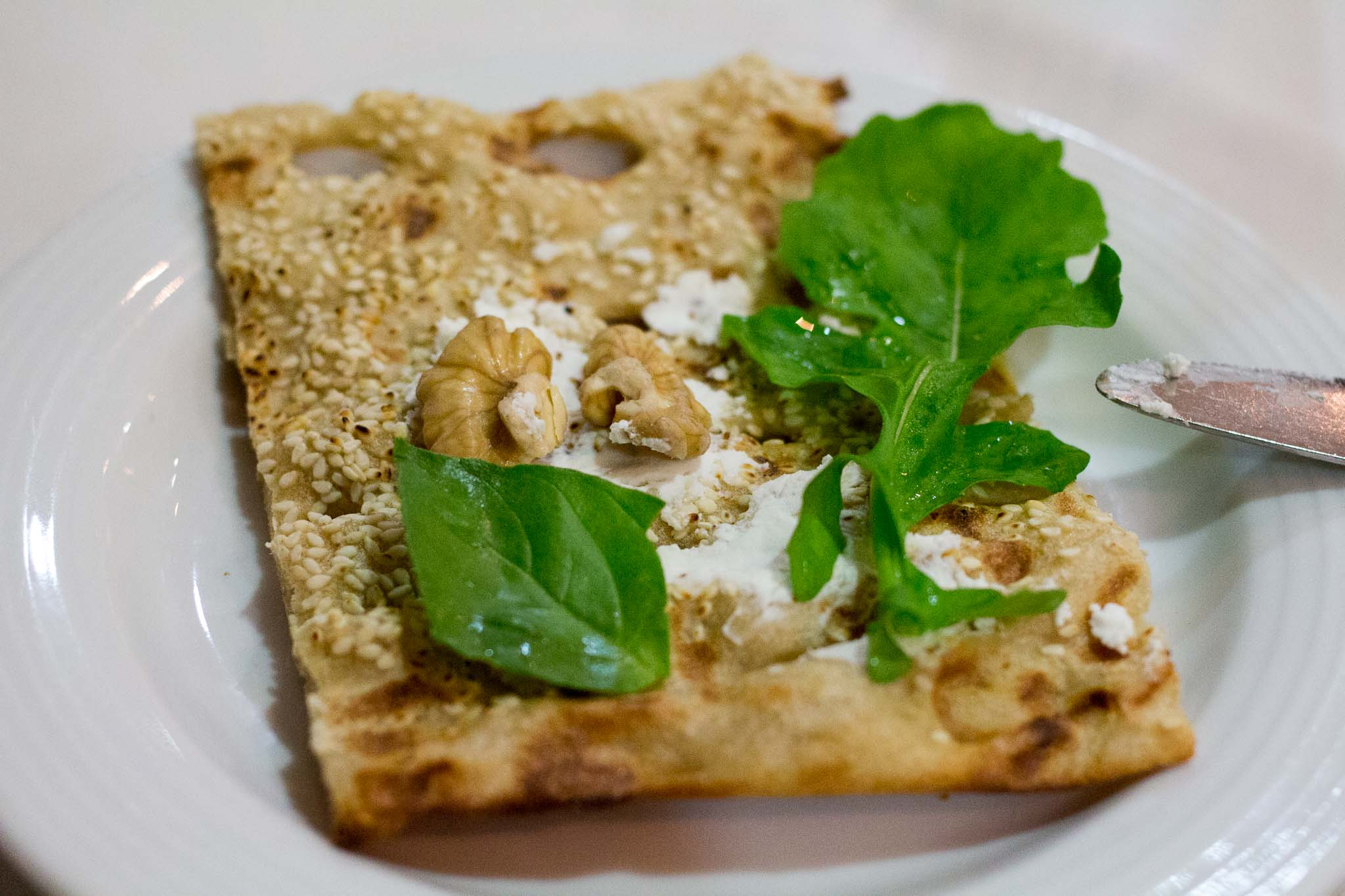
Sangak, cheese, vegetables, walnuts: a common Iranian breakfast.

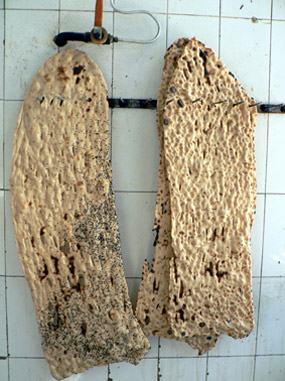
Sangak hung on the walls of a bakery.

== See also ==
- Barbari bread, Iranian leavened white bread
- Lavash, a common Armenian unleavened bread
- Taftan, an Iranian bread
- Sheermal, a saffron-flavored traditional Iranian flatbread of Iranian cuisine
