= Pebete =

South American bun

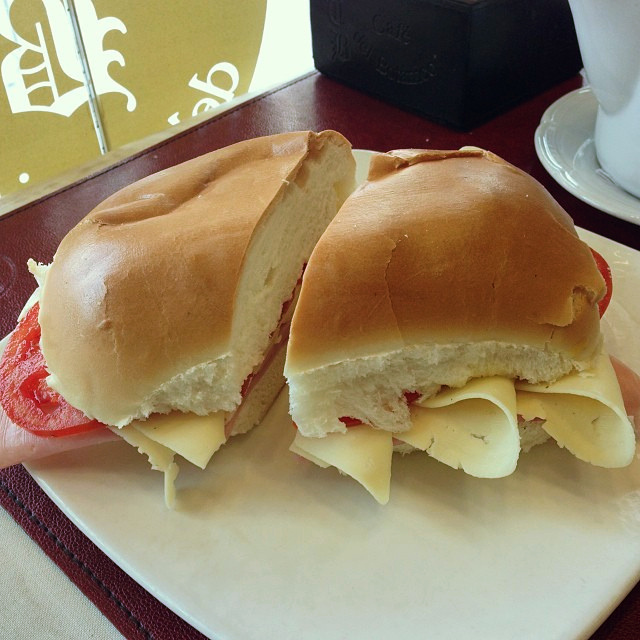
- pebete with ham, cheese and tomato
- Type: Sandwich
- Place of origin: Argentina
- Main ingredients: Bun, cheese, cured meat, tomatoes, mayonnaise

A pebete is an Argentine and Uruguayan soft oval bun made of wheat flour with a thin brown crust, rather like a fatter hot dog roll. It is often used to make a sandwich, typically filled with cheese, cured meat, tomato and mayonnaise; the sandwich itself is usually called pebete followed by its filling, e.g., pebete de queso (cheese pebete).

According to the Royal Spanish Academy it is from the lunfardo term for young boy, itself from Catalan pevet.

Another theory about the origin of the name "pebete" suggests that it derives from the similarity between its pronunciation and the Spanish initials for "toasted white bread" — Pan Blanco Tostado (PBT).

== See also ==
- List of buns
- List of sandwiches
