= Pão de cará =

Brazilian type of bread

- Type: Bread
- Place of origin: Brazil
- Main ingredients: cará, wheat flour, corn, beer (traditional) eggs, butter or margarine, sugar, salt, white flour, yeast and water (alternative) sweet flour premix and water (industrialized)

Pão de cará (cará bread) is a type of bread from Santos, Brazil. Originating in the 20th century, it is an immaterial cultural heritage of the municipality, being almost as popular as pão francês.

Despite the name, pão de cará is rarely made with cará, due to the difficulty of baking the bread with the tubercle. There is a disputed hypothesis that the bread never used cará as an ingredient, and the name comes from its color.

== Description ==
Pão de cará is a typical bread from Paulista cuisine, specifically from Santos. The bread is usually eaten during breakfast, afternoon snack or dinner, being almost as popular as pão francês in the municipality.

The bread has a thin and shiny crust, soft crumb and is slightly sweet. It has a purple color if made with purple cará.

== History ==
Pão de cará was created around the 20th century to diminish the use of wheat flour in the baking process. Wheat flour had to be imported, thus it was too expensive and almost exclusive to the higher class. The price of the flour became especially expensive during World War I and II. Cará, on the other hand, was readily available. The first register of the bread is from 1911.

The price of the bread inflated with the development of the Brazilian wheat industry and the lack of specialized workers, which led to changes in its recipe. Cará stopped being used as an ingredient.

Alternatively, some historians suggest cará was never used as an ingredient, and the name is derived from its color, that reminds of the tubercle.

Benedito Furtado (PSB) created the bill in February 2022 to turn pão de cará into an immaterial cultural heritage of Santos after a social media post of a santista surprised for finding the bread in São Paulo went viral. Furtado based the bill on his trip to Pernambuco, where he saw the legal status bolo de rolo had in the state. The bill was sanctioned by the mayor Rogério Santos (PSDB) through the Law no. 4,032 of 7 June 2022. In 2025, the prefecture inaugurated Índice de Preços ao Consumidor Cará (IPC-Cará), a price index that measures the inflation of pão de cará.

Despite being originated in Santos, it is also sold in São Paulo, where it is called "pão de cará de Santos" (Santos' cará bread). Since 2024, Santos hosts the festival SanduCará, dedicated to selling sandwiches made with pão de cará. During the Carnival of 2025, the samba school Bandeirantes do Saboó opened the parade with the samba-enredo "Cará, o Rei do Meu Carnaval" (Cará, King of My Carnival), that pays homage to the bread.

== Preparation ==
Traditionally, the dough was made by mixing white flour with cará, corn and beer. If the cará was boiled before, the bread would have a sweeter taste. The humidity brought by the cará makes the production process harder and affects the quality of the bread. The exact original recipe is unknown, and there is a hypothesis that cará was never used as an ingredient.

Later, the bread was made out of "cará powder", a mix of eggs, butter or margarine, sugar, salt, white flour, yeast and water. With the advent of industrialization, a premix called "sweet flour" began to be sold, where the only thing needed to make the dough is to add the right amount of water. Nowadays, cará is hardly used as ingredient.

It's common to sell variants of the bread, including with chocolate chips, oatmeal, molasses and wholemeal flour.
