= Sepik (bread) =

Estonian wheat bread

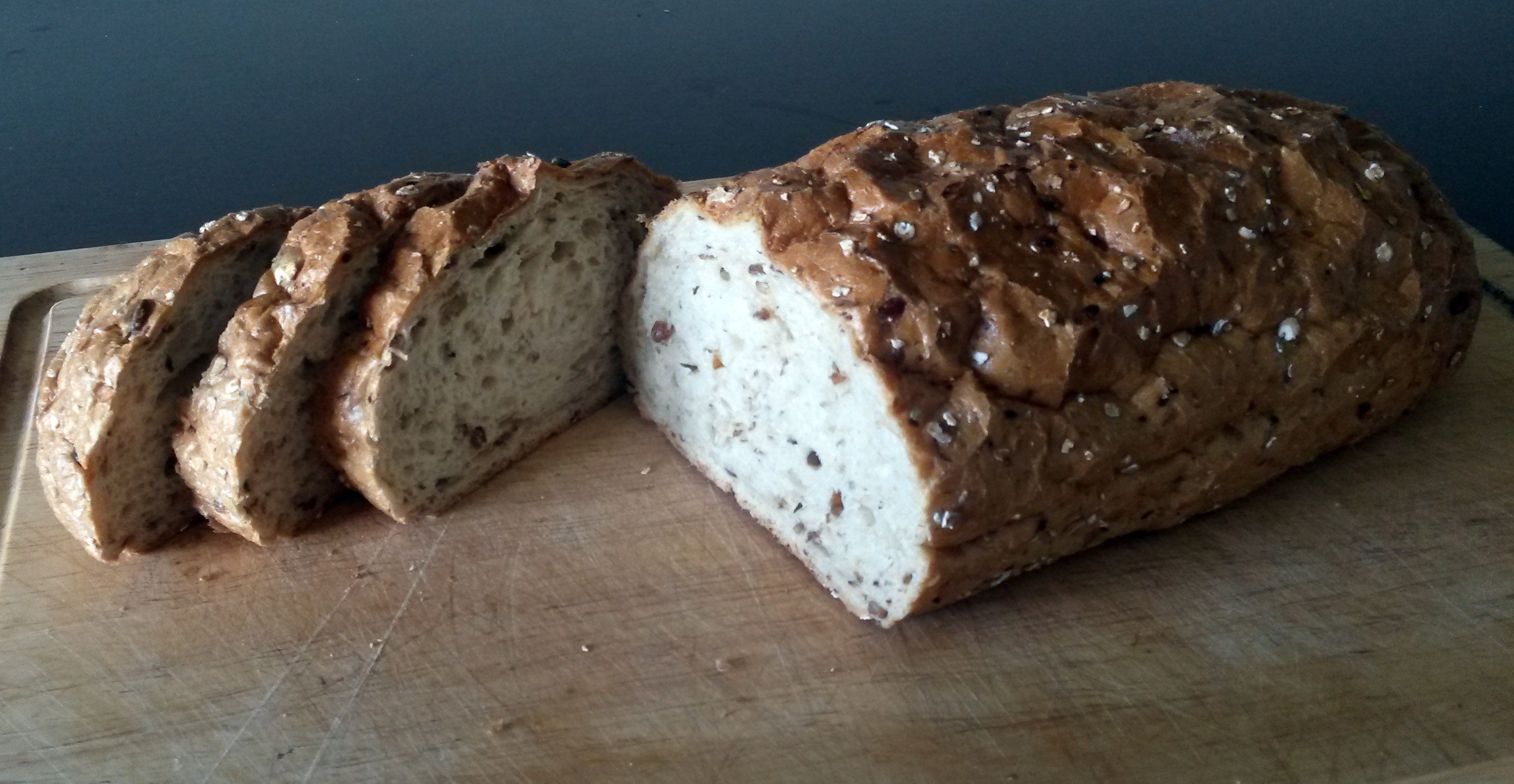
- Type: whole wheat bread
- Place of origin: Estonia

Sepik is an Estonian whole wheat bread. Sepik is prepared with wheat flour or with a mixture that can contain wheat, rye, and barley flour. Additionally it can contain bran.

Traditionally the bread was served for the celebrations like New Year, Vastlapäev, or St. Martin's Day. The direct predecessor of sepik is a barley bread known in South Estonia as karask.

Many food companies in Estonia and other Baltic states make their own variations of sepik which differ from the traditional Estonian sepik. It has been described as comparable to Graham bread in the U.S.

== See also ==
- List of breads

== Citations and references ==
=== Cited sources ===
- Кальвик, Сильвия (1987). Эстонская кухня [Estonian cuisine] (in Russian). Периодика.
- Sune, Ingrid (2009). Eesti-inglise Eesti köögisõnastik [English-Estonian Culinary Dictionary] (in Estonian). Tartu Ülikool.
- Ränk, Gustav (1976). Old Estonia, the people and culture. Indiana University.
- Kärner, Karin Annus (2005). Estonian Tastes & Traditions. Hippocrene Books. ISBN 9780781811224.
