= Mohnflesserl =

Pastry

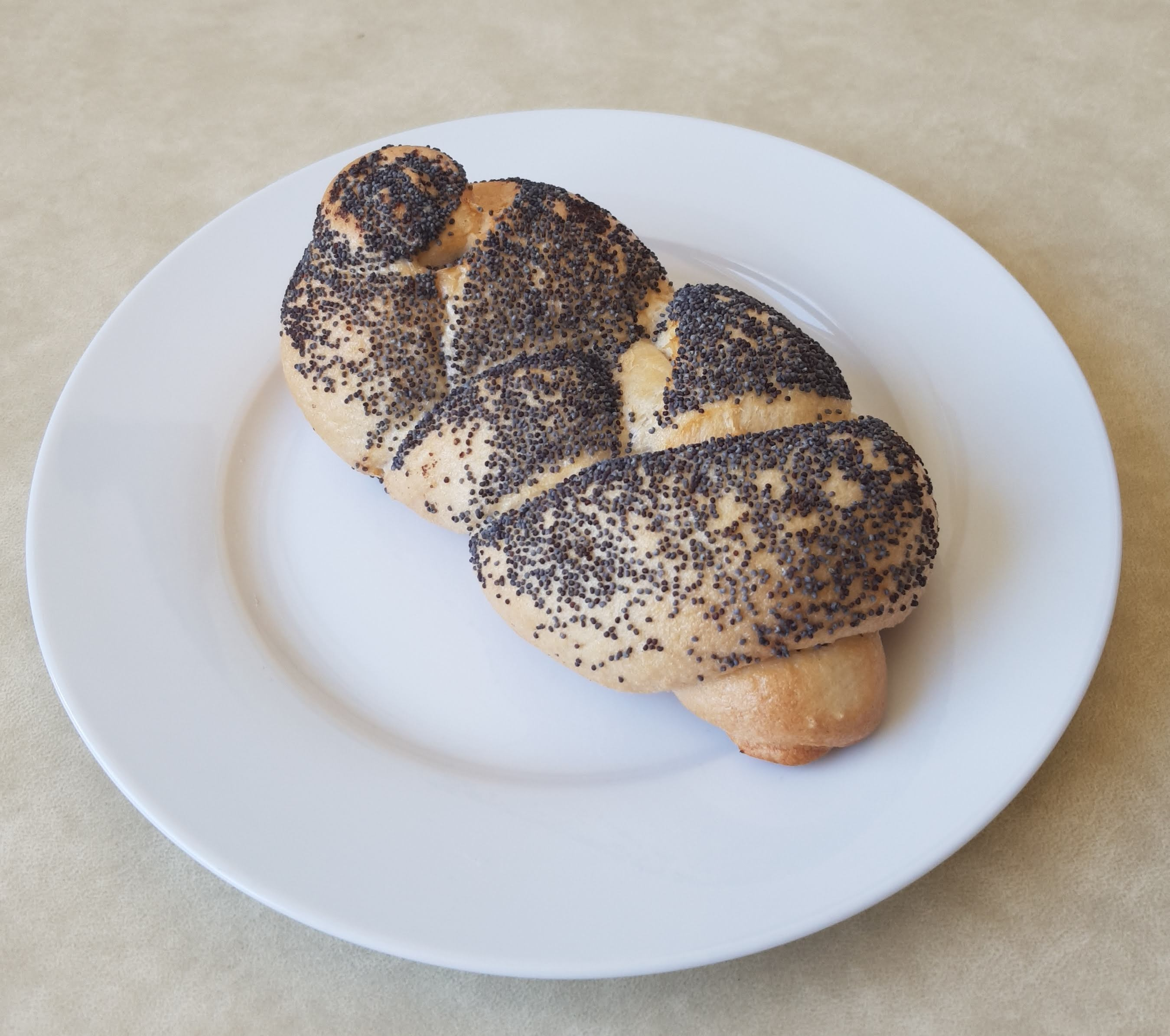
Mohnflesserl without salt

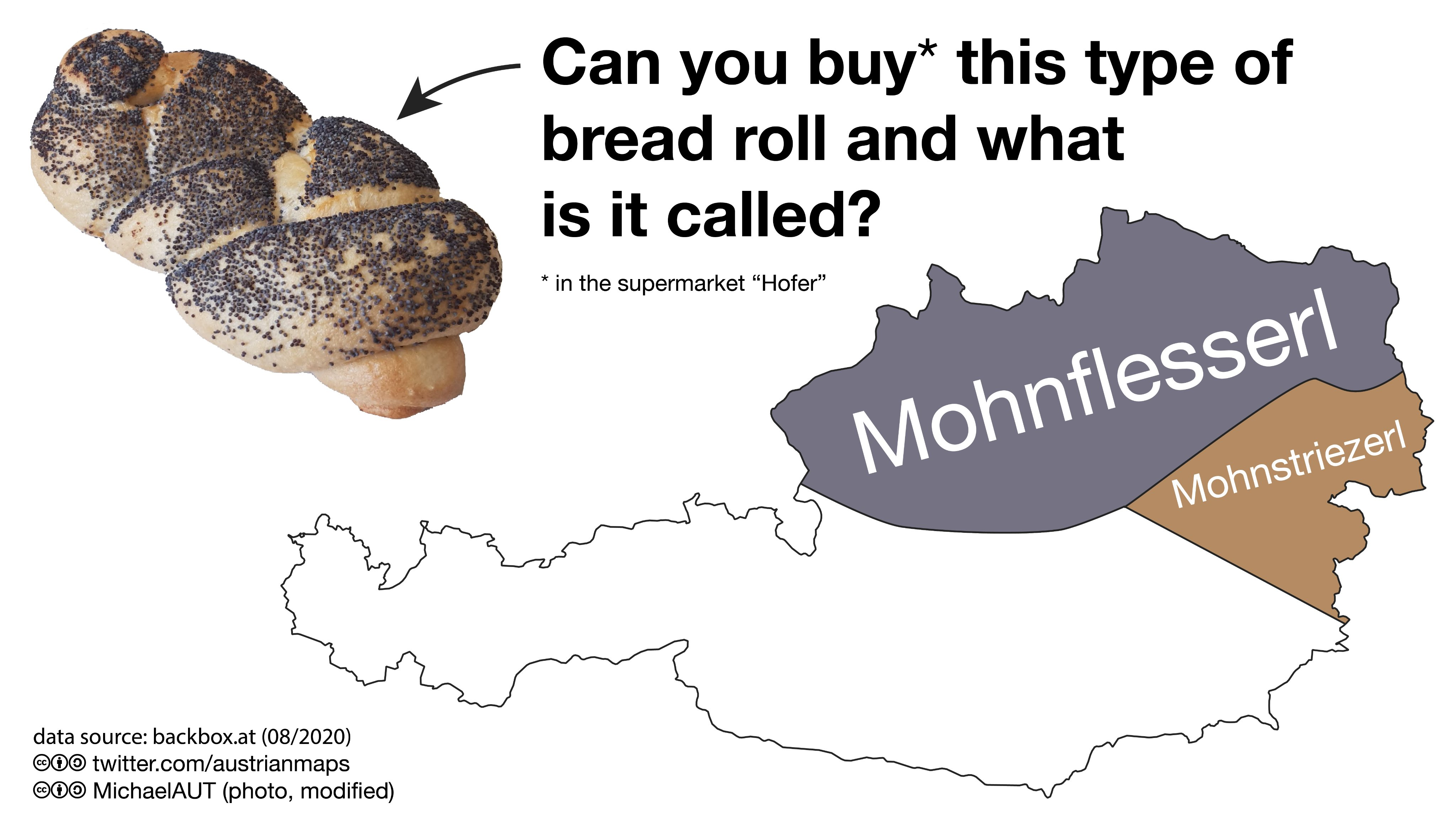
Distribution of the name varieties

Mohnflesserl or Mohnstriezerl is a traditional Austrian pastry in the form of a braided bun. It is typically sprinkled with poppy seeds and, especially in Upper Austria, with salt, and sometimes served glazed.

== Name ==
Mohnflesserl comes from the German "Mohn" meaning poppy. In other countries, different names are used for similar or identical pastries. Some such names include "Mohnstriezel" (poppy striezel) or the more widely used "Mohnzopf" meaning literally, "poppy plait". In Eastern Austria, the name "Mohnweckerl" (small poppy loaf) is also common.

The term "Flesserl" harks back to the times when salt was transported from the Salzkammergut through Upper Austria via the Traun on rafts (German: Floß).
