= Sgabeo =

Italian food

Sgabei
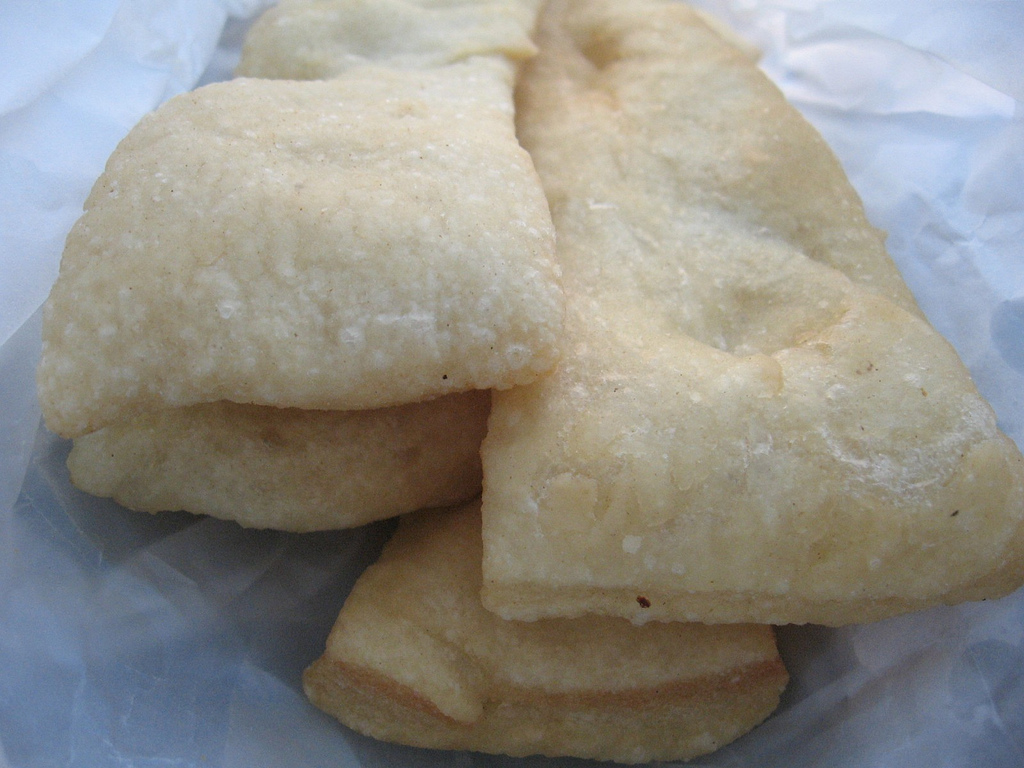
- Type: Doughnut
- Place of origin: Italy
- Region or state: Lunigiana
- Main ingredients: Leavened bread dough

Sgabei is an Italian food from Lunigiana, a historical region now divided between Liguria and Tuscany. It is a leavened bread dough, cut into strips, fried and salted on the surface, which is traditionally eaten plain or stuffed with cheeses or salumi. Lately, however, it is not uncommon that sgabeo is also proposed as a sweet, filled with pastry cream or chocolate.

== Origin ==
The recipe for sgabei originates in the Val di Magra, in the far east of Liguria, where women used to fry the dough left over from the production of bread in lard to create a sort of fried bread to accompany salumi and cheeses.

== See also ==
- List of doughnut varieties
- List of fried dough foods
