= Ngome (bread) =

Malian flatbread

- Type: Flatbread
- Place of origin: Mali
- Main ingredients: Millet, water, vegetable oil

Ngome is a flatbread made in Mali using only millet, water and vegetable oil. The millet is typically home-ground and coarse.
