= Lye roll =

Bread product

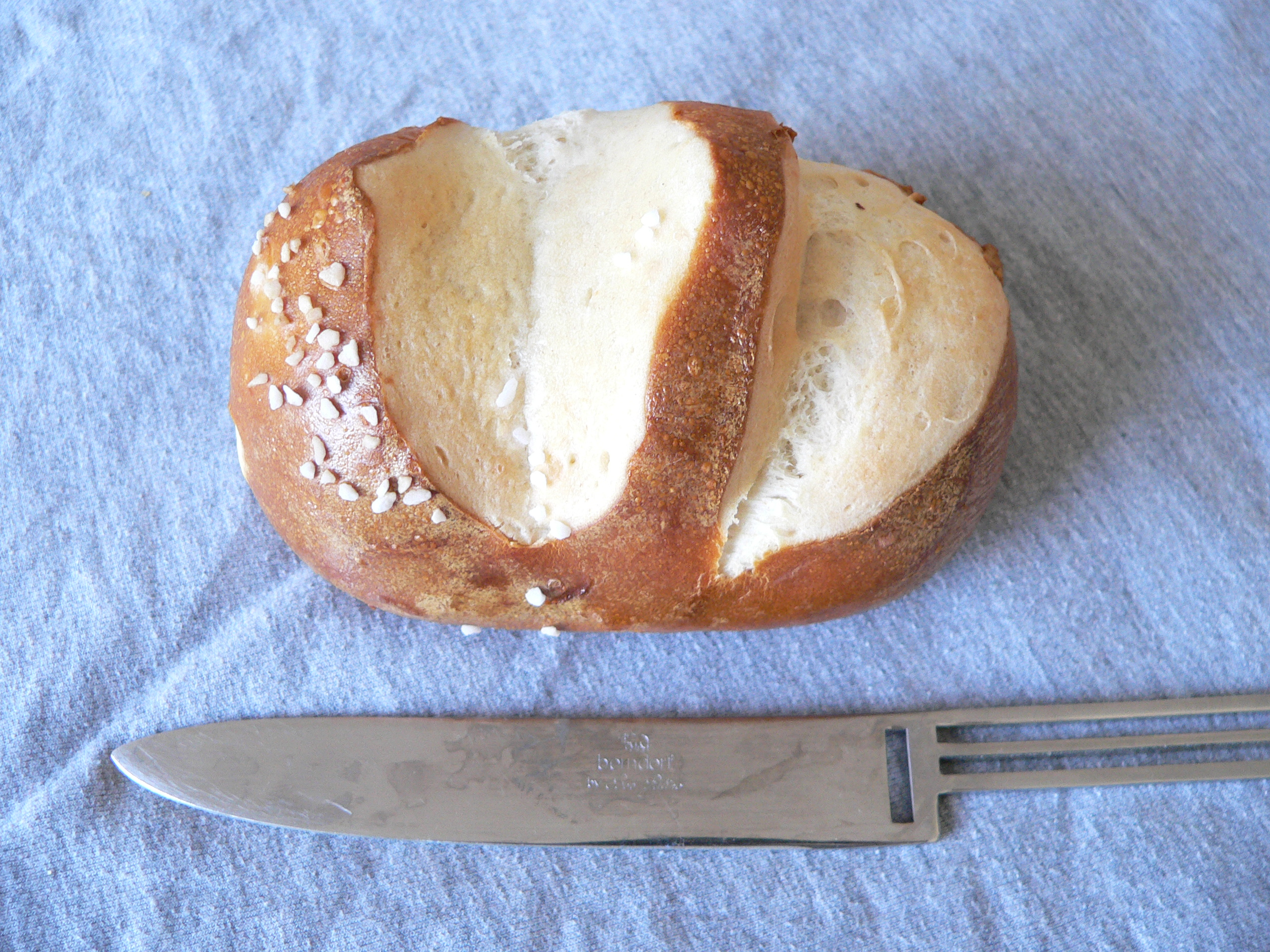
- Type: Bread roll
- Place of origin: Germany; France; Switzerland; Austria
- Region or state: Bavaria; Baden-Württemberg; Alsace
- Main ingredients: Bread roll, solution of lye or baking soda

Lye rolls are a baked specialty in Germany (especially in Bavaria and Swabia), France (Alsace), Switzerland, and Austria. They are made by immersing bread rolls in a lye solution before baking. The German name, Laugengebäck, is used for any baked good dipped in lye. The perhaps best known shape is the pretzel, while rolls or buns are specifically called Laugensemmel or Kastanie (Bavarian), Laugeweckle or Laugestängle (Swabian), and Laugenwecken, Laugenbrötchen or Laugenstange (everywhere else in Germany); Laugenweckerl in Austria; Silserli or Laugenbrötli in Switzerland. In some parts of Asia they are also known as laugen rolls.

In France, the lye roll is known as a mauricette. It was invented by Paul Poulaillon in the Alsace region when he opened the first Poulaillon bakery in 1973. It was later registered as a trademark with an alternate name, Moricette, in 1985. The lard was then replaced by rapeseed oil.

== Lye ==
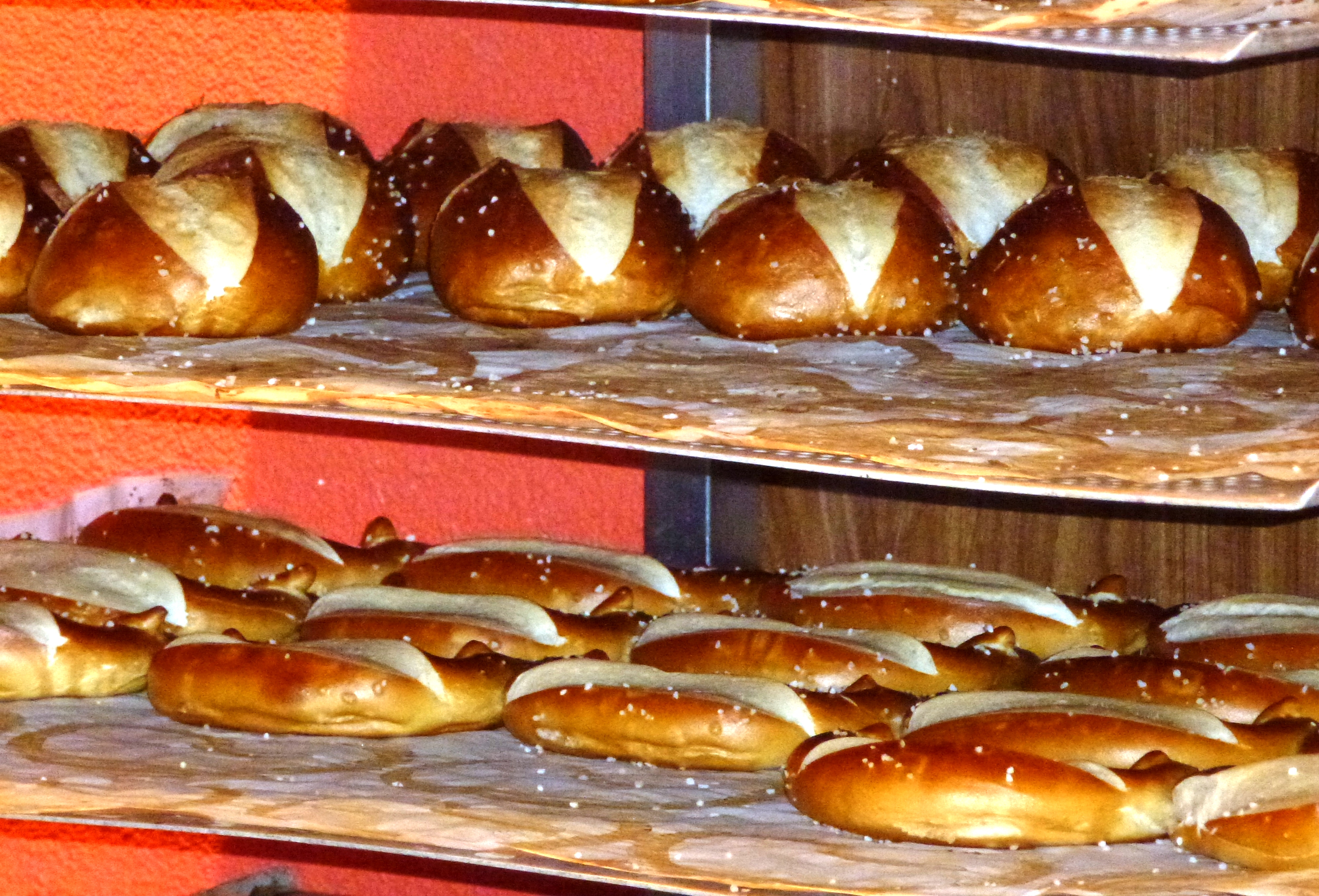
Lye roll and pretzels immediately after baking.

In order to cause a Maillard reaction during baking for the characteristic browning effect, a lye roll needs to be coated with a high pH (alkaline) solution. The higher the pH, the stronger the reaction. Lye (sodium hydroxide (NaOH) or potassium hydroxide (KOH)) is a highly alkaline agent most commonly used for the purpose. However, lye is not the only way to produce the needed result: a baking soda or washing soda solution, which is easier to handle and safer to use, will provide a similar product but will not provide as strong a reaction, so the effect will be less pronounced. Lye is the strongest agent, followed by washing soda, and then baking soda.

The same solution is also used for preparing pretzels; outside of German-speaking countries they are often the only baked food commonly glazed with a lye solution.

== Presentation ==
Both lye rolls and pretzels are typically covered with salt, preferably pretzel salt, a large-grained salt made from compressed smaller salt particles, which reduces the moisture absorption, and hardness of the salt grain. As a snack, lye rolls may also be sold as sandwiches or covered with baked cheese, although this is a more recent development and less common. Typically they are cut in half and buttered, as large soft pretzels often are in Germany and Switzerland as well. Other toppings for lye rolls nowadays also include poppy, sesame, and other seeds as an alternative to the usual salt.

In Germany, they are sold in many shapes and forms, with many having unique names. For example, Laugenstange (“lye bar”) are long oval rolls, while Laugenbrötchen (“lye rolls”) are small round rolls.

== See also ==
- Other foods prepared with lye are lutefisk, hominy, and alkaline noodles
