= Khanom bueang =

Thai pancake

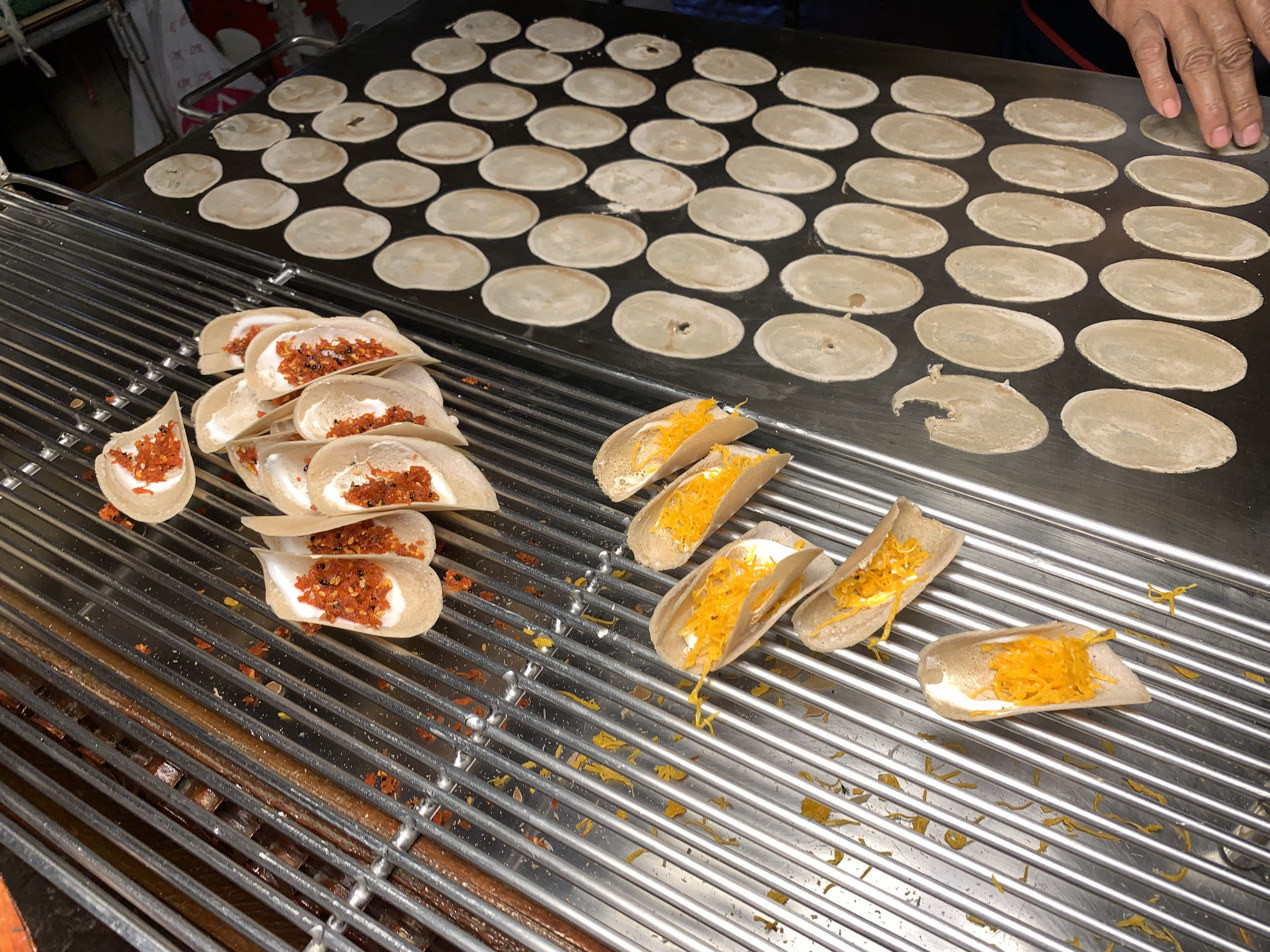
- Khanom bueang salty (left) and sweet (right) variations made at a stall in Mueang Ang Thong
- Type: Pancake
- Place of origin: Thailand
- Main ingredients: Rice flour
- Similar dishes: Khauk mont

Khanom Buang (Thai: ขนมเบื้อง, pronounced [kʰānǒm bɯ̂a̯ŋ]), known as Thai crêpes or crispy pancakes in English. Kanom Bueang is an ancient Thai snack. It is a popular form of street food in Thailand. They resemble tacos and are usually first topped or filled with meringue, followed by sweet or salty toppings such as shredded coconut, Foi Thong (strips of fried eggs or egg yolks), or chopped scallions.

== History ==
Khanom bueang is a Thai snack from the Ayutthaya period. Because in the testimony of Khun Luang ha wat said that, In that era there was no difference between Thai Khanom bueang and Vietnamese Khanom bueang because Vietnamese Khanom bueang has not yet come to Thailand. But one of the stories appears in the book "Dhammaboodpadad" and it said that Khanom bueang came from India and Brahmanism in the Sukhothai period and so was brought to Thailand. Moreover many people have assumed that Khanom bueang cake can be related to the crepes in France.

For famous areas in Khanom bueang in Bangkok such as Banglamphu or Talat Phlu etc.

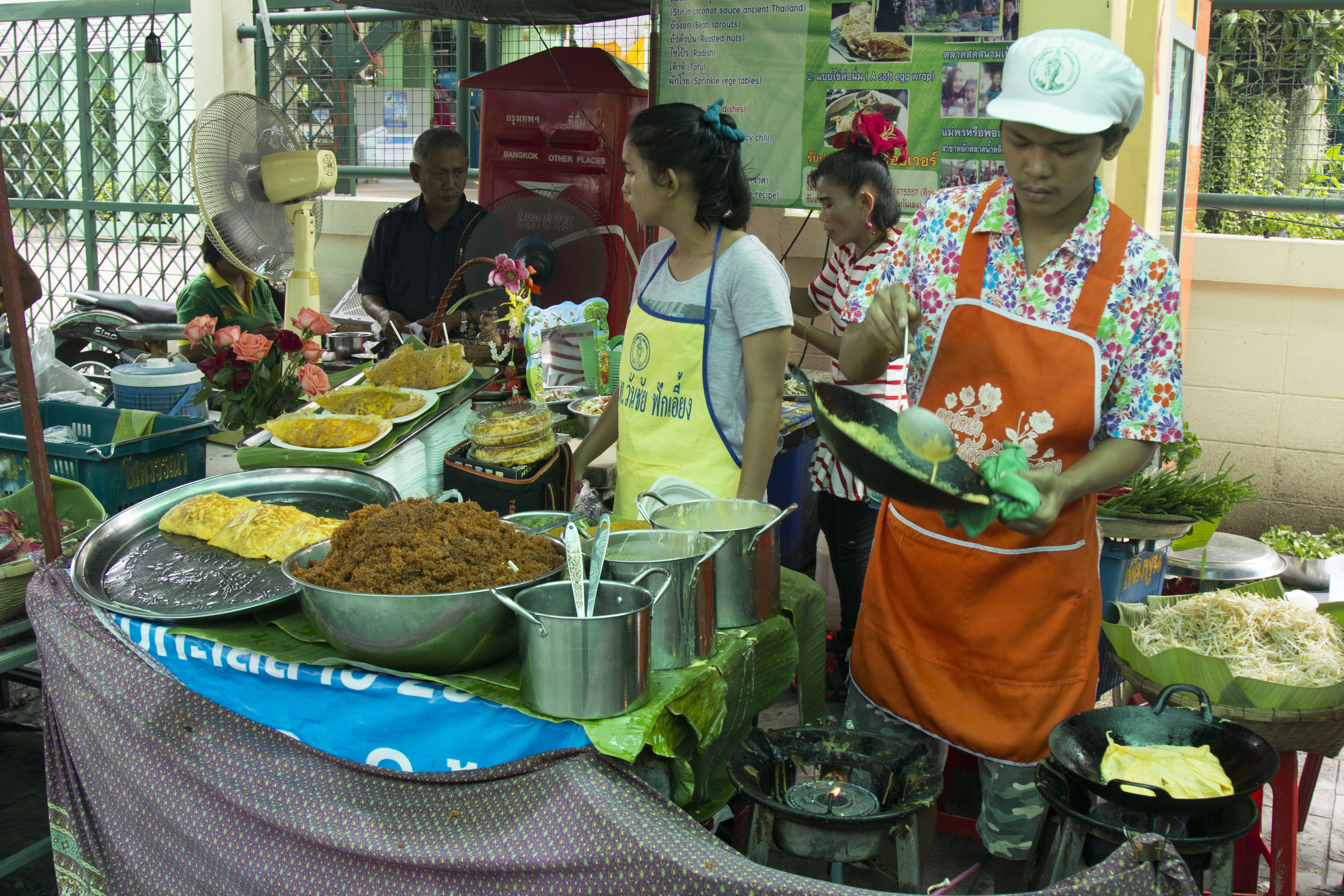
Thai bánh xèo, Khanom bueang yuan sold at Taling Chan floating market in 2015

== Similar dishes ==
Bánh xèo in Vietnamese cuisine is believed to be the origin of Khanom bueang. In Thailand, they are known as Khanom bueang yuon (Thai: ขนมเบื้องญวน, pronounced [kʰānǒm bɯ̂a̯ŋ jua̯n˧], "Annamese crêpes").

The Burmese counterpart, known as khauk mont, is comparatively larger, and is made with rice flour, jaggery, and coconut.

== See also ==
- List of Thai desserts
