= Sheermal =

Saffron-flavoured traditional flatbread

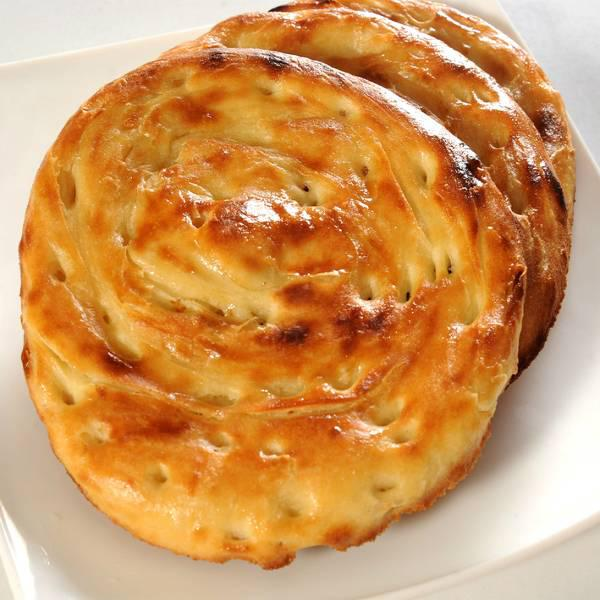
- Sheermal served in Iran
- Alternative names: Shirmal
- Place of origin: Iran, India
- Region or state: Iran, Indian subcontinent
- Main ingredients: Maida, milk, ghee, saffron

Sheermal (Persian/Urdu: شیرمال, Hindi: शीरमल) also spelled shirmal, is a saffron-flavored traditional flatbread in South Asian cuisine. The word sheermal is derived from the Persian words شیر (translit. sheer, Sanskrit kshir) meaning milk, and مالیدن (translit. malidan), meaning to rub or to knead. In a literal translation, sheermal means milk-rubbed. It was said to have originated in Sassanid Iran and was introduced to North India by the Mughal emperors during the medieval period. It became part of Lucknow, Hyderabad and Aurangabad. It is also part of Awadhi cuisine and is eaten in Bhopal and brought to Pakistan post partition.

== Preparation ==
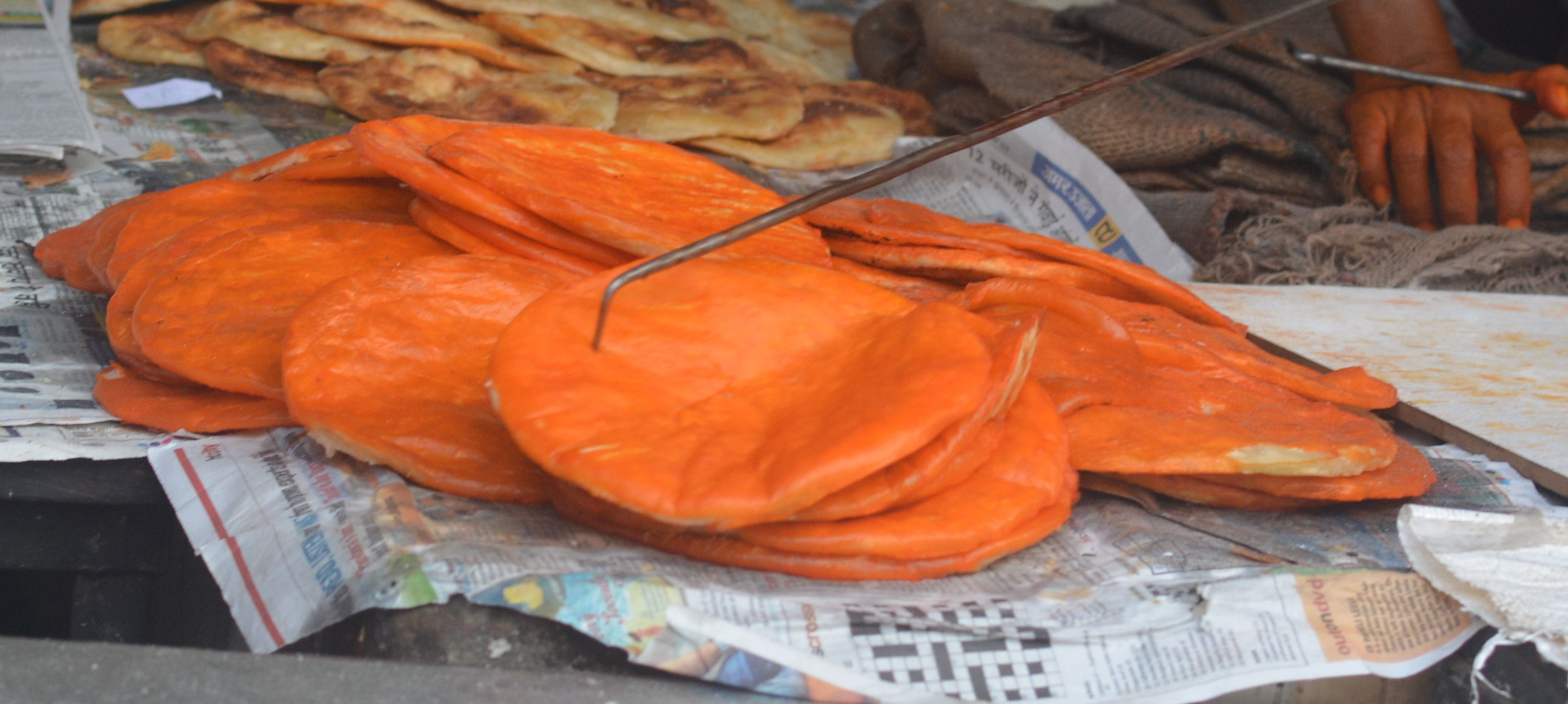
Sheermal served at Lucknow, India.

Shirmal is a mildly sweet naan made out of maida, leavened with yeast and baked in a tandoor or oven. Sheermal was traditionally made like roti. Today, sheermal is prepared like naan. The warm water in the recipe for naan roti was replaced with warm milk sweetened with sugar and flavored with saffron and cardamom.

In India, especially arounr Lucknow, sheermal is sometimes served with kababs, tikkia, or alongside nihari.

== See also ==
- List of Indian breads
