= Nanbai =

Regions with significant populations
- Countries: Pakistan, IndiaRegions: Lucknow, Faizabad, Barabanki, Kanpur, Aligarh, Moradabad

Religion
- Islam

The Nanbai are a Muslim community found in the state of Uttar Pradesh in India. Many members of Nanbai community have migrated to Pakistan after the partition of India and have settled in Karachi, Sindh.

== Background ==
The name Nanbai means "maker of nan". The Nanbai specialize in baking fermented loaves and are seen as experts in the preparation of tandoori roti. This roti is called nan.

== Geography ==
The Nanbai are geographically distributed across Lucknow, Faizabad, Barabanki, Kanpur, Aligarh and Moradabad.

== Religion ==
The Nanbai follow the Sunni sect of Islam. They believe in Allah and in the teachings of Holy Koran and Sharia. At local level, they venerate Ajmer Sharif, and Dewa Sharif. They celebrate Mawlid, Shab-e-Barat, Eid al-Fitr and Eid al-Adha.

== Language ==
They speak Urdu and Hindi. When writing, they use Urdu and Devanagari scripts.

== Dress Code ==
They wear the kurta and banyan. Nanbai women wear salwar, garara for the upper body and a cloth piece called dupatta. When Nanbai women move outside the home, they cover themselves with a burqa.

== Family structure ==
The Nanbai have both joint and nuclear family systems. Joint families are based more on the family occupation where many people are required to work together.
