= Tandoor bread =

Type of flatbread

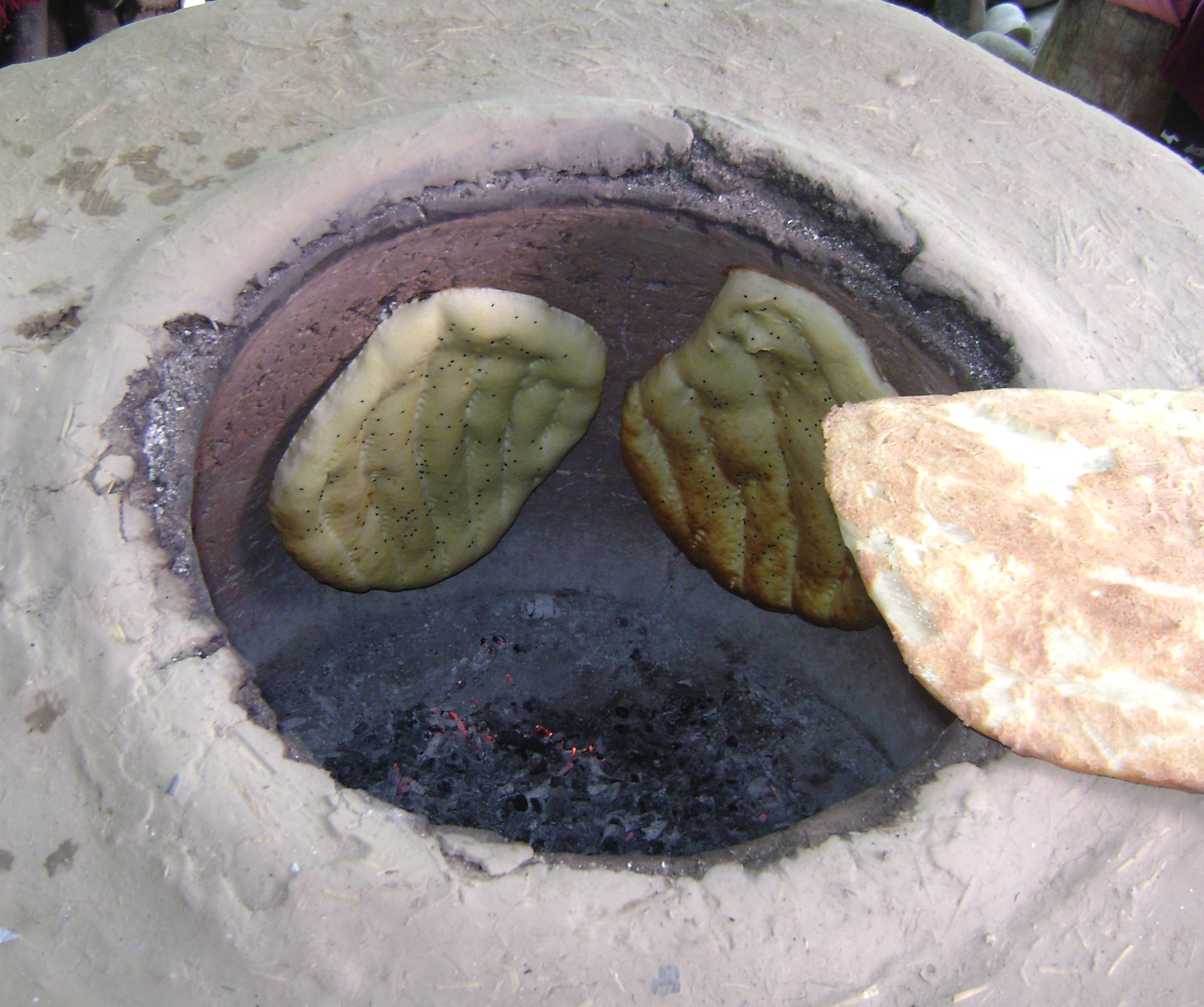
- Tandoor flatbreads
- Region or state: Asia
- Main ingredients: Flour

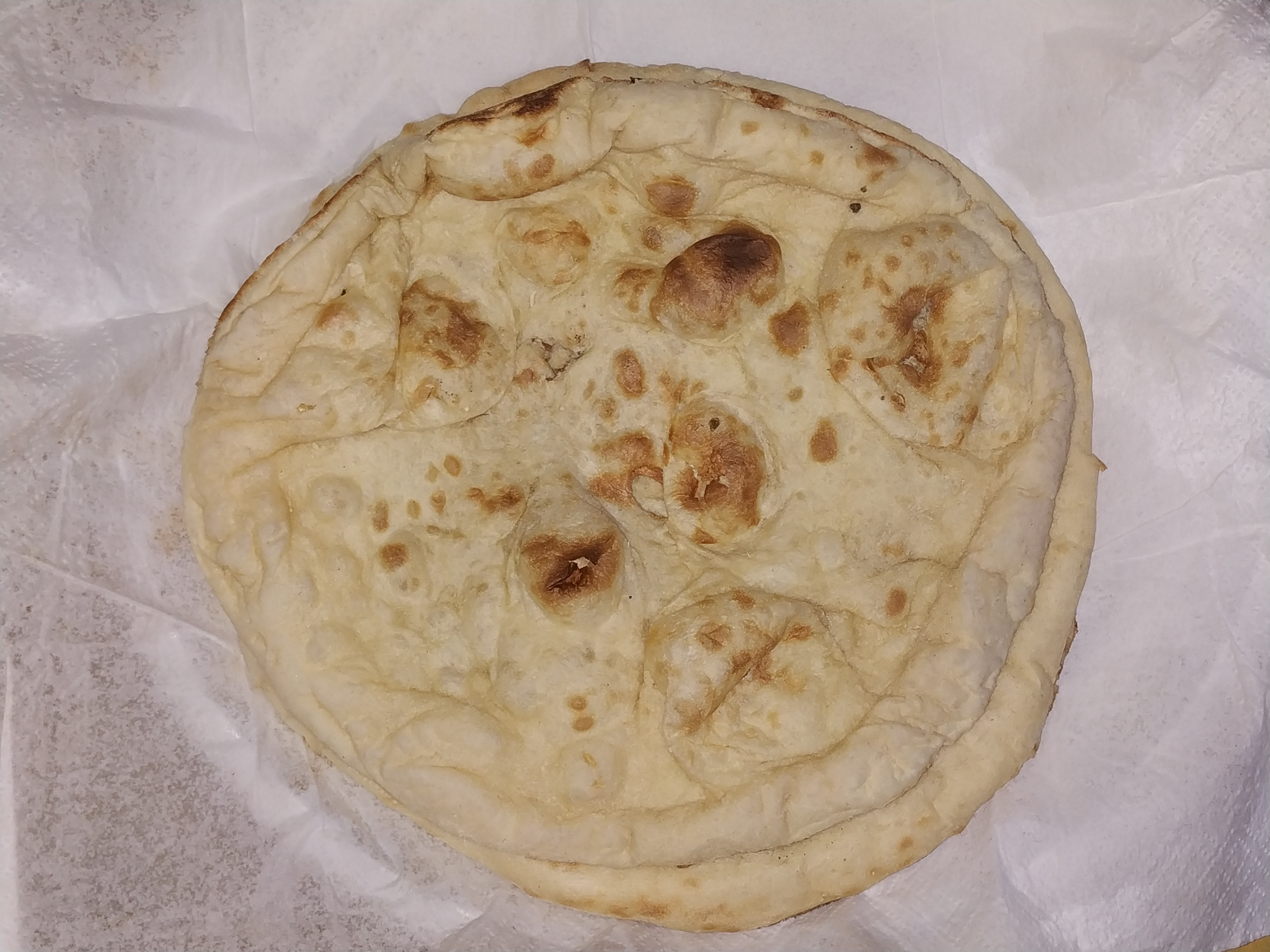
Tandoori bread from Uttar Pradesh

Tandoor bread is a flat bread baked in a clay oven called a tandoor. The technique has been in use for some five thousand years in Central and West Asia and the Indian subcontinent. It may be leavened or unleavened. It is often round, but may be made as elongated oval lavash or canoe-shaped shotis puri.

Because of the expense of a tandoori oven, Indian villages used to share communal ovens. These have been replaced by the habit of bringing food to a local bakery to be baked there. An alternative is to use a wood- or charcoal-fueled oven or grill to give the food a smoky flavor recalling that of tandoor bread.

== Etymology ==
The English word tandoor comes from Hindi/Urdu tandūr (तन्दूर / تندور), which derives from Persian tanūr (تنور) or tandūr (تندور). According to the Dehkhoda Persian Dictionary, the Persian word ultimately came from the Akkadian word tinūru (𒋾𒂟), which consists of the parts tin 'mud' and nuro/nura 'fire' and is mentioned as early as in the Akkadian Epic of Gilgamesh. Tandoor is called kandu in Sanskrit literature, in which tandoori parched, roasted cuisine is described as kandu pakva (grains, meat, etc. roasted in a tandoor) along with roasting on coal which has been called angara pakva.

== History ==
Food was first cooked in tandoor ovens some five thousand years ago. Remains of a clay oven with indication of cooked food have been excavated in the Indus River valley site of Kalibangan, and other places in present-day Afghanistan, Pakistan, north India, Iran, Iraq, and Central Asia.

== Varieties ==
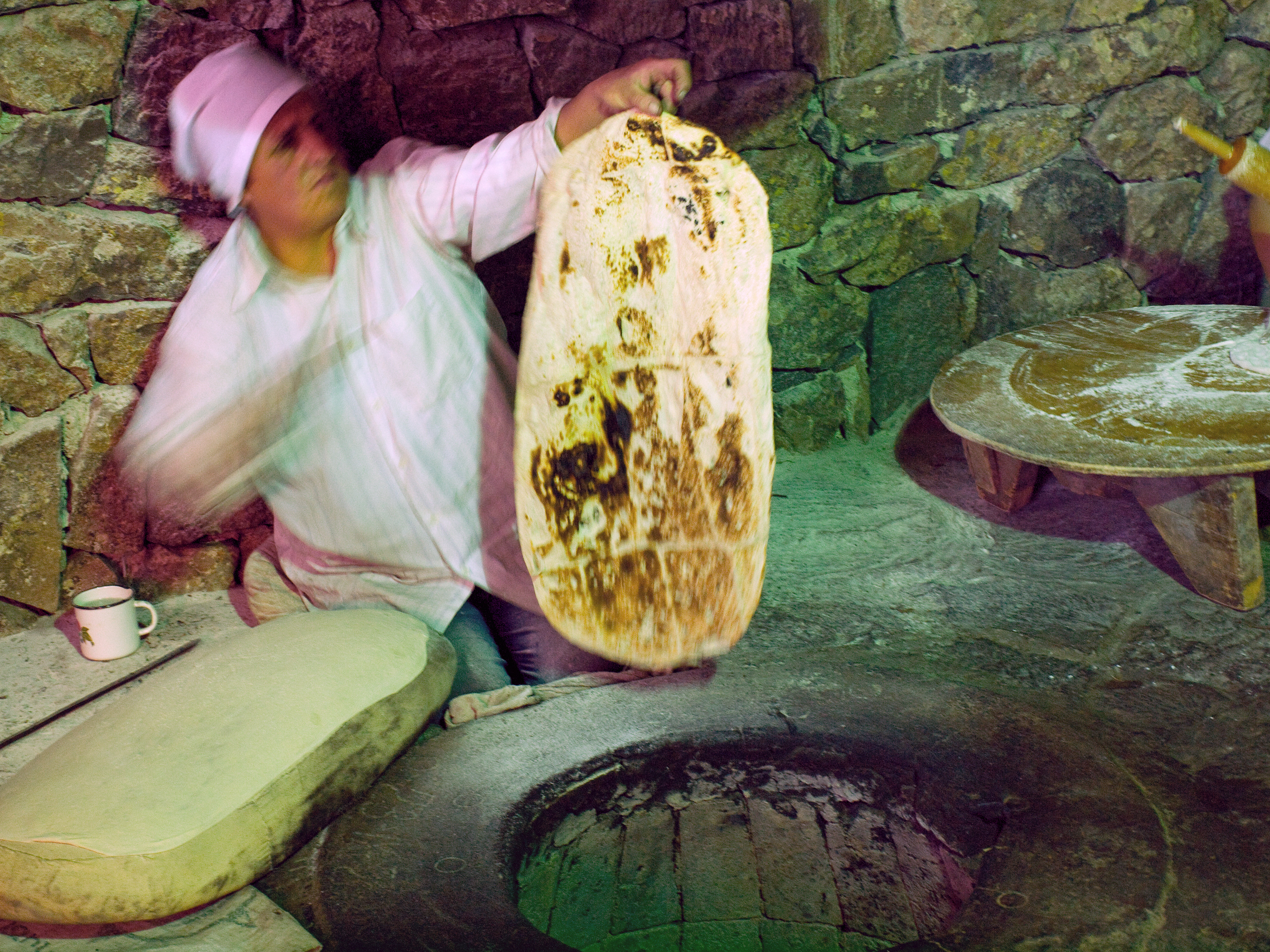
Lavash made in tandoor in Armenia

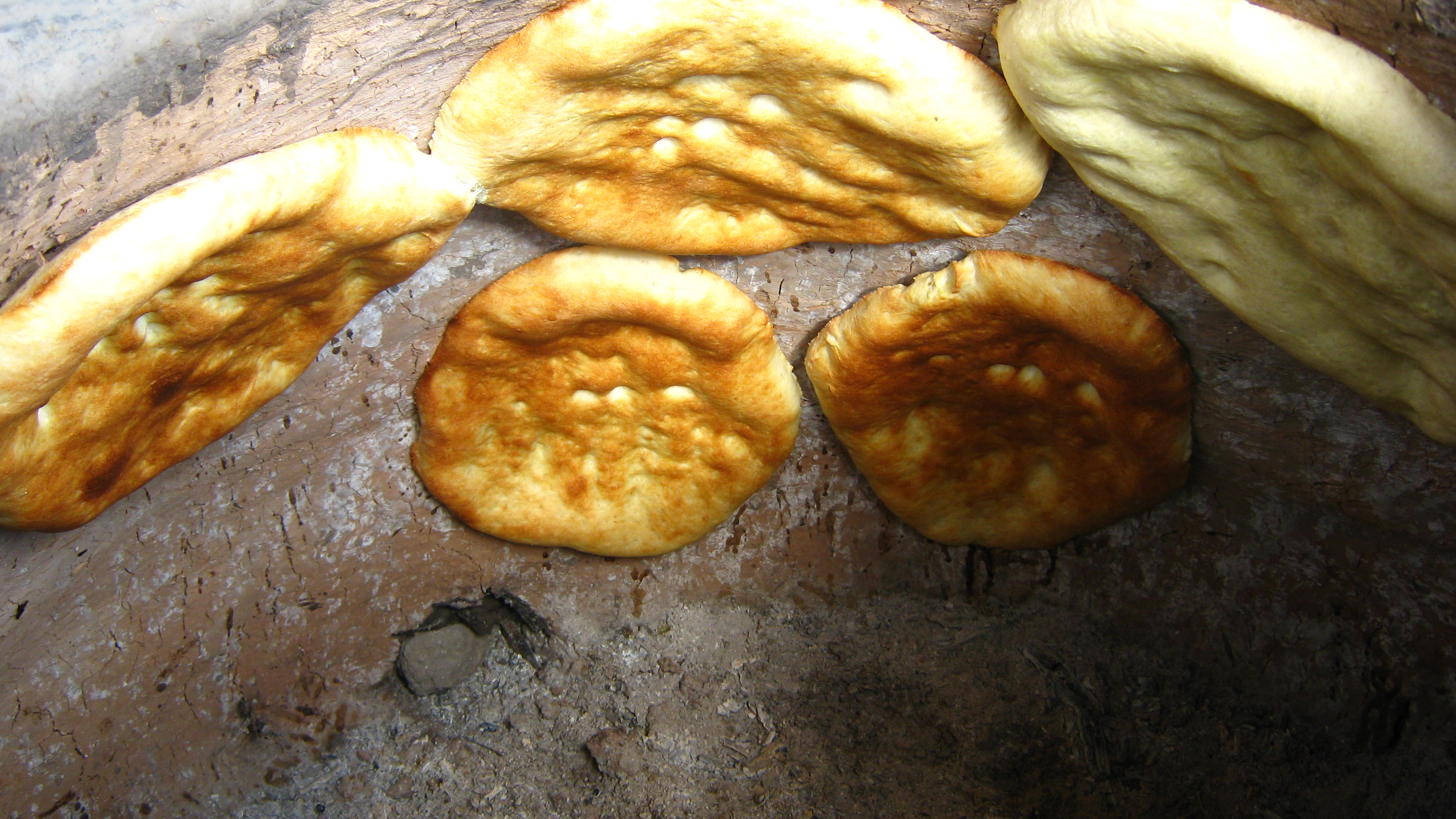
Baking tandoor bread in Azerbaijan

Georgian tonis puri

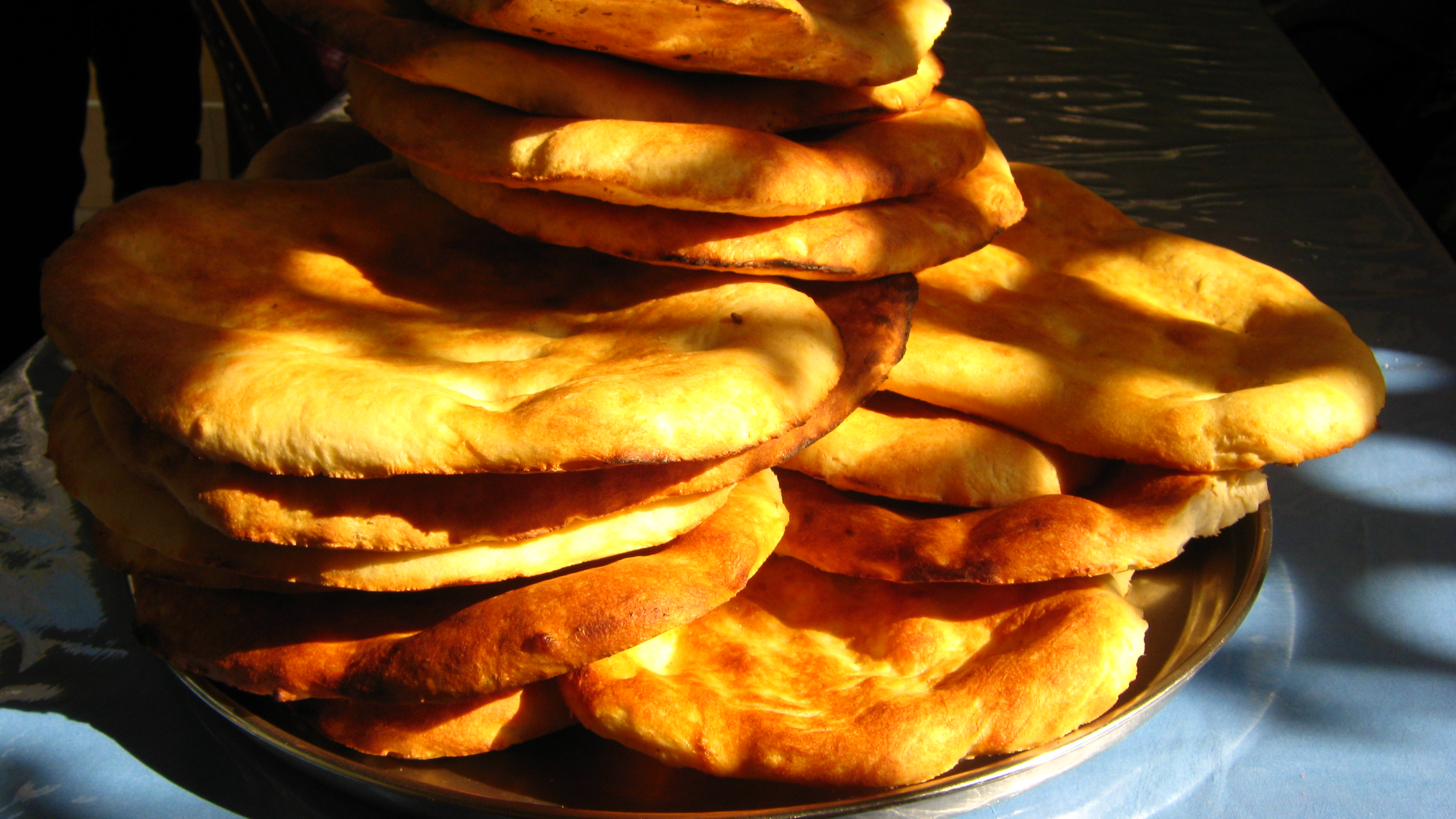
Prepared tandoor bread

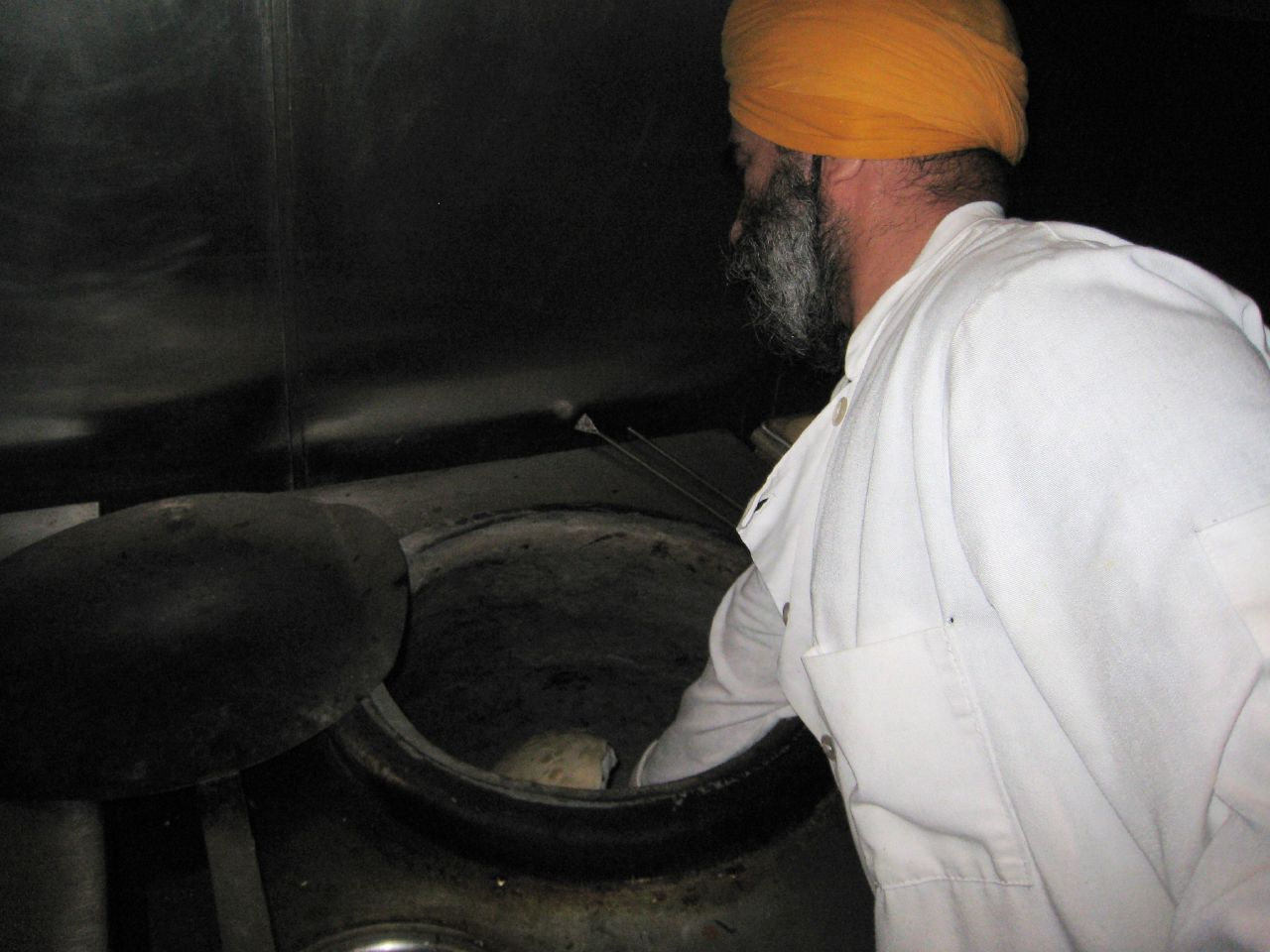
Making tandoor bread in India

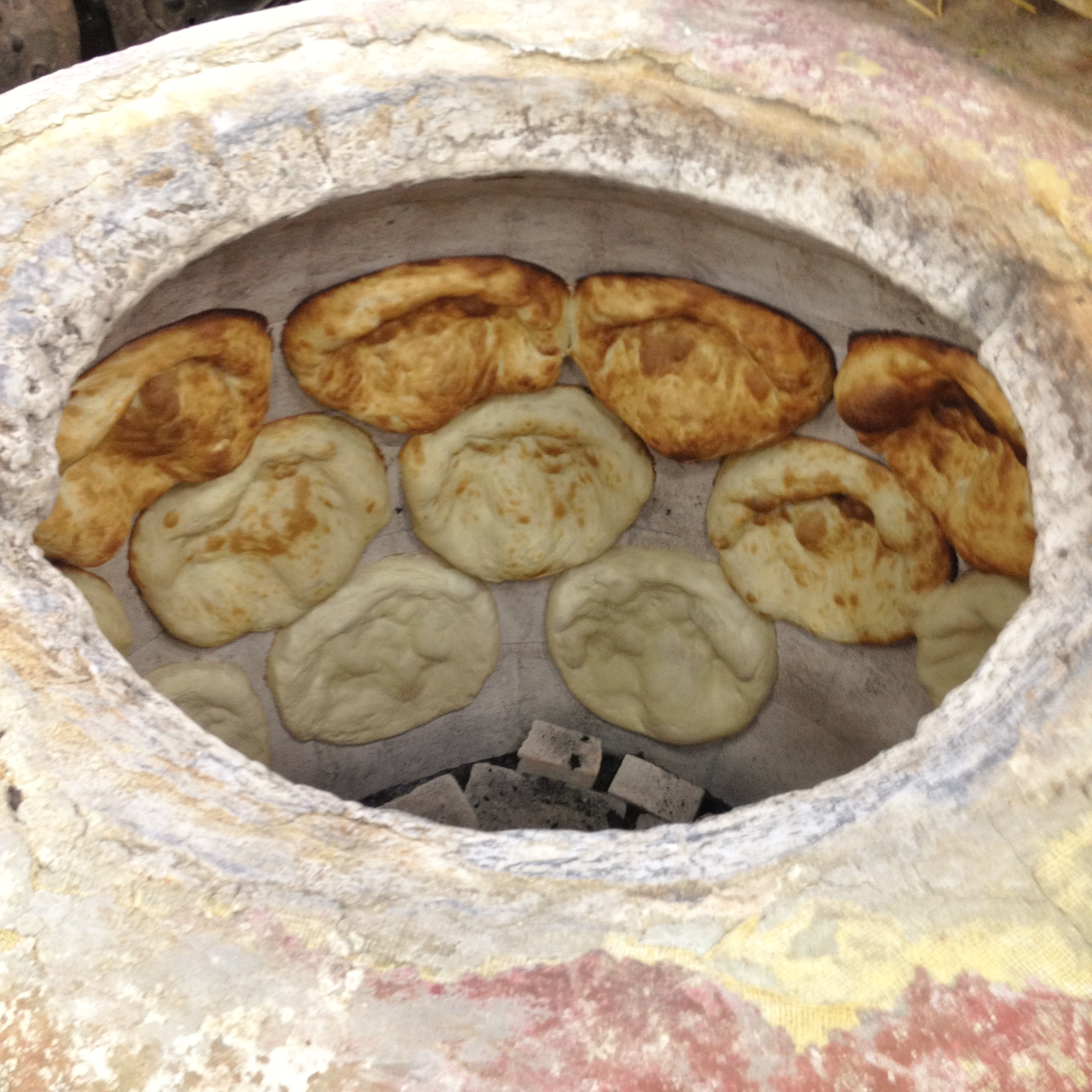
Tonis puri

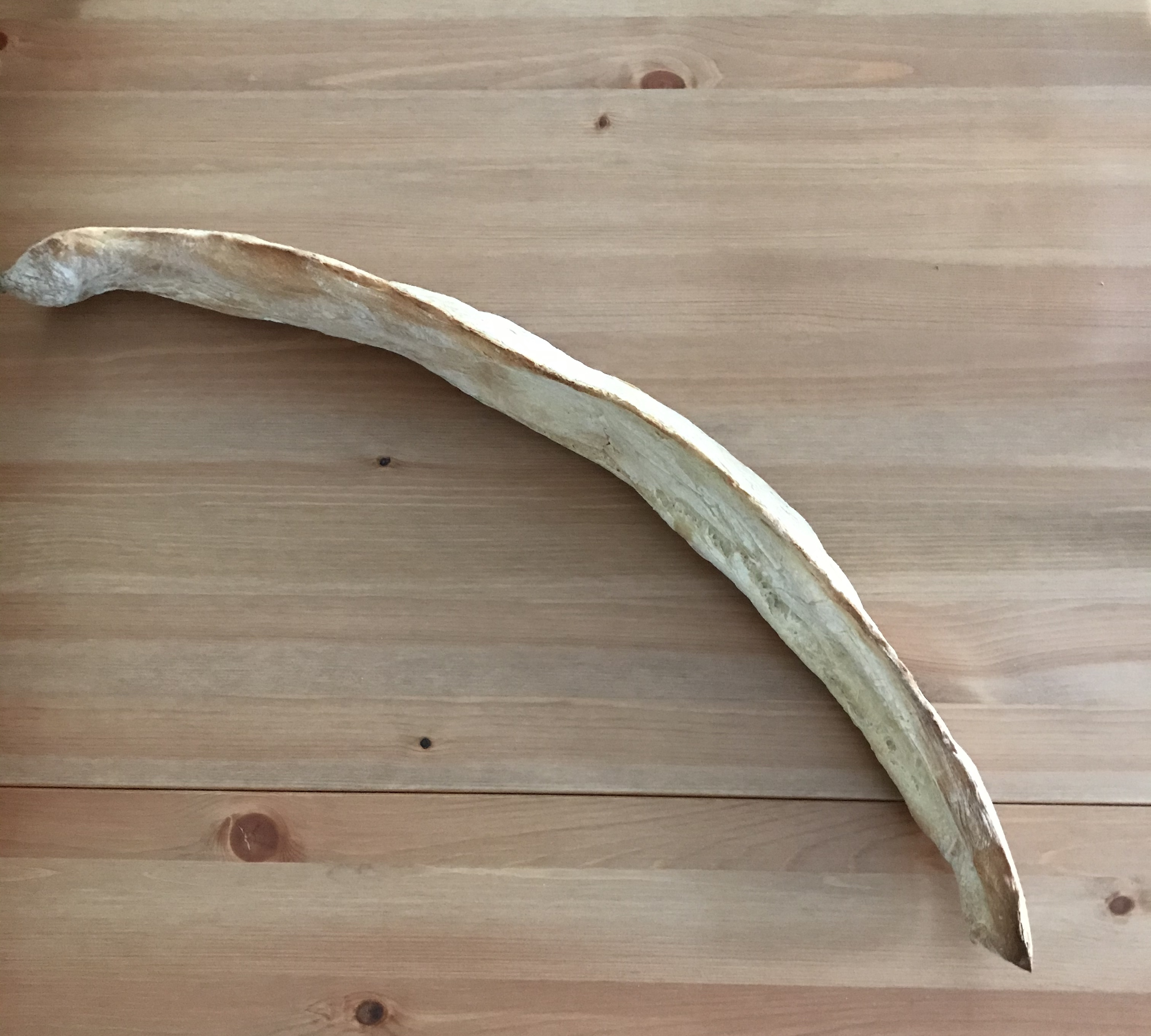
Georgian Shotis puri

=== West Asia ===
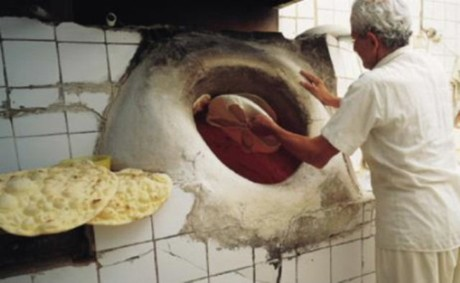
Preparation of khubz al-tannur in Bahrain

The Arabic name for tandoor bread is ḵubz al-tannūr ('bread of the tannur' Arabic: خبز التنور). In some places where it is especially common, such as Iraq, it may be called simply khubz (bread).

In Iran, tandoor breads are known as nân-e-tanūri (Persian: نان تنوری). Varieties include nân-e barbari (Persian: نان بربری), tâftun (تافتون), and shirmal (شیرمال).

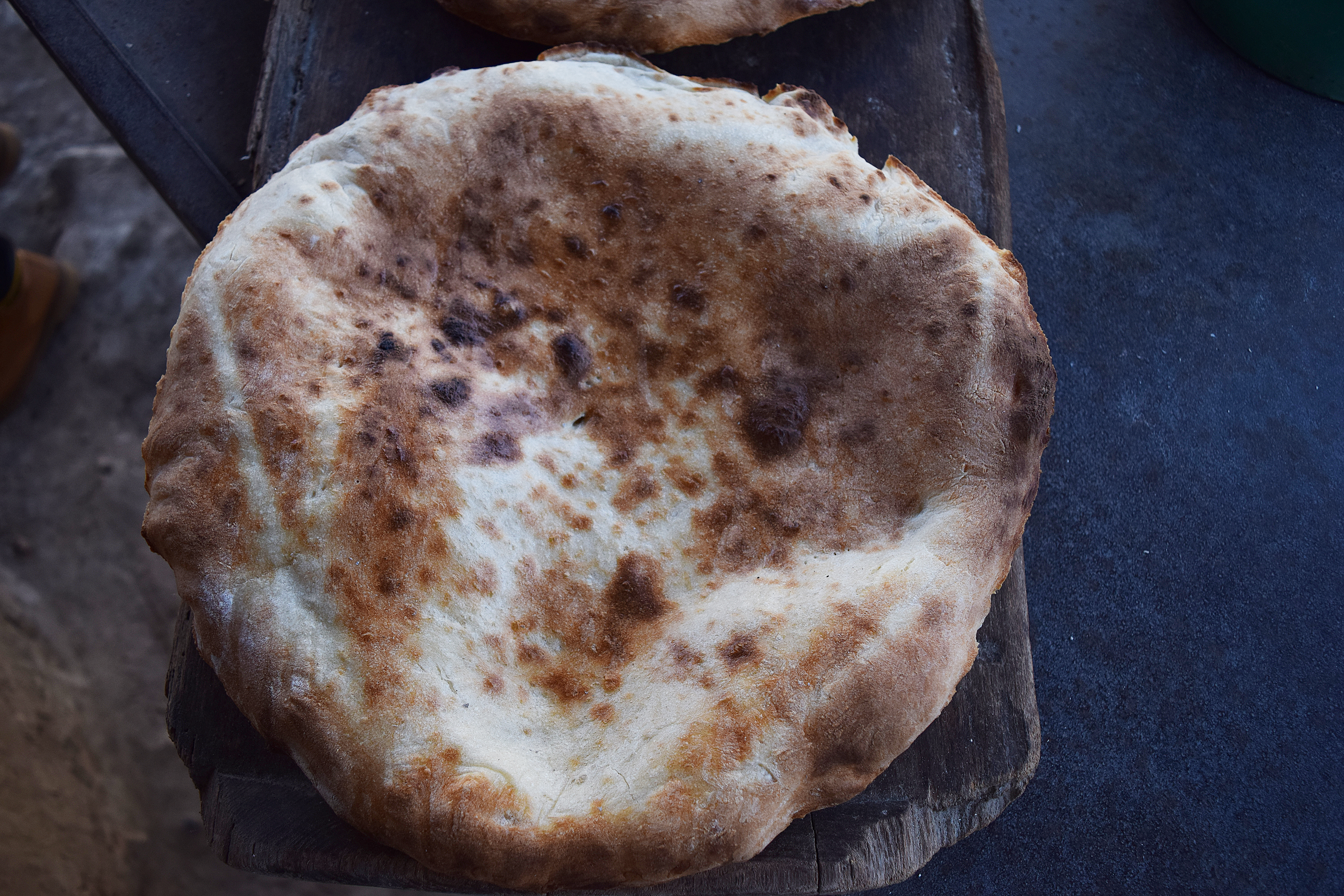
Armenian tonri hats from Aygestan, Nagorno-Karabakh

In Georgia and Armenia, a traditional tandoor is called a tone (Georgian: თონე) and tʿonir (Armenian: թոնիր), and the bread baked in the tone is called tonis ṗuri (Georgian: თონის პური or tʿonir hacʿ Armenian: թոնիր հաց). Canoe-shaped shoti (Georgian: შოთი) is a kind of tonis ṗuri. Lavash (Armenian: լավաշ lavaš) is a flatbread that is also often prepared in a tonir.

=== Central Asia ===
In Central Asia, tandyr nan (Kazakh/Kyrgyz: тандыр-нан tandır-nan, Uzbek: tandir non, Uyghur: تونۇر نان tonur nan, Tajik: нони танурй noni tanuri) is made and eaten.

=== South Asia ===
Tandoor breads are popular in northern Indian regions, where naan breads and atta flatbreads such as the Tandoori roti are baked in tandoor clay ovens fired by wood or charcoal. These naans are known as tandoori naan (Gujarati: તંદૂરી નાન, Hindi: तंदूरी नान).

Tandoor ovens are not common in the average Indian home because they are expensive to fabricate, install and maintain. Authentic tandoori cuisine in urban areas can often be found in specialty restaurants. However, in rural areas in India such as Punjab, the tandoor oven is considered a social institution, for a tandoor oven is shared among the community. Women would go to the oven place with atta along with their marinated meats to meet their neighbors and friends, so they could converse and share stories while waiting for their food to cook. The people in cities once engaged in this social activity, but as businesses and commercialism grew in these areas, communal tandoor ovens became rare. Not uncommonly, people bring food to their local bakeries to cook it there at a fair price. Because of this, people have developed ingenious techniques to replicate the cooking process and the food without the use of the oven. Common alternatives include an oven or a grill fueled by charcoal or wood so the food will be infused with the smoky flavor.

In Pakistani cuisine, tandoor breads are a staple across the country. These range from a simple unleavened Tandoori roti, to yeast-based khamiri roti, as well as richer and more complex (yeast, milk, egg, etc.-based) naans and kulcha breads.

Tandoor bread is gaining popularity in Asia, North America (especially the Caribbean) and Europe due to the Indian diaspora during British colonialism.

=== Caribbean ===
Tandoor bread is found in Caribbean countries such as Guyana, Suriname and Trinidad and Tobago (as roti).

== Physical and chemical composition ==
Aroma, smell, appearance, color, size and overall texture are the general characteristics that are optimized by producers of tandoor bread. The texture and quality of tandoor bread are determined by the percentage of wheat protein, the number of essential amino acids and the type of flour present in the bread. Various studies have demonstrated that the chemical and biochemical composition of flour affects the flour's ability to interact with the other ingredients in tandoor bread.

Response surface methodology is a process which allows for the development of palatable tandoor breads that have a long shelf life and contain minimal amounts of polycyclic aromatic hydrocarbons, which may pose health hazards. For optimal sensory and chemical stability of tandoor bread, the water level is 720 milliliters per kilogram, protein concentrations range from 10.3% to 11.5%, between 1.2 and 1.6% salt is added, and the bread is baked in temperatures ranging from 330 to 450 °C.

== See also ==
- Primitive clay oven
- Wood-fired oven
- Samsa (food)
