= Tandyr nan =

Type of Central Asian flatbread

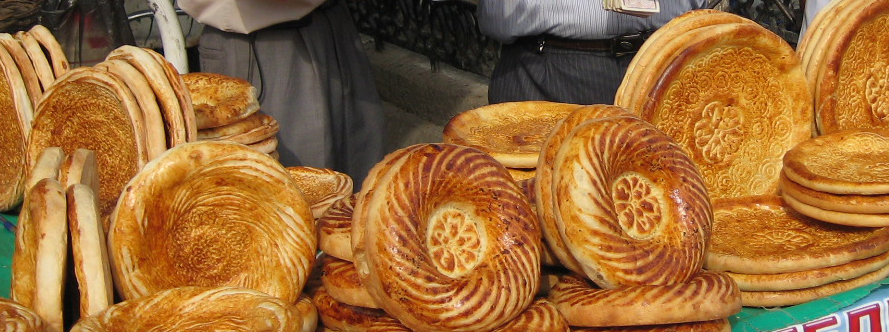
- Type: Tandoor bread
- Place of origin: Central Asia; Kazakhstan; Kyrgyzstan; Tajikistan; Turkmenistan; Uzbekistan; Xinjiang

Tandyr nan is a type of Central Asian bread cooked in a vertical clay oven, the tandyr or tandoor. It is circular and leavened with yeast, and typically has a crisp golden surface. They are often decorated by stamping patterns on the dough, and can be topped with ingredients like sesame seeds, nigella seeds, or thinly sliced onion.

== Preparation ==
Large tandyr ovens used to bake nan as well as cook meat are typically located outdoors. Unlike Indian tandoor ovens, in Central Asia the tandyr can be used in a vertical or horizontal position, although the bread is always baked in the manner of a vertical oven, with the bread stuck onto the inner walls of the oven. The leavening can derive from sourdough starter, as is traditional, or from brewers yeast. Several filled variants of the bread exist, such as Uyghur gosh nan and Turkmen atli nan. Bakers of nan are called nonvoys.

=== Designs ===
Nan is often decorated with a central design in the shape of a circle consisting of patterned dots. This design is created with a special round stamp called in Uzbekistan by the Turkish word çekiç (chekich) or in Turkmenistan or by Uyghurs in Xinjiang as durtlik. It is made of wood and the pattern is usually made of nails. In addition to giving each bakery's nan a distinct design, the holes created by the chekich allow steam to rise from the flattened interior part of the nan. A radial pattern of slashes or dots can also be added with a bosma, a tool often made with reused bicycle spokes. Other bakers may use a chekich several times on the surface of their nan. Nan for festive occasions may have more elaborate designs or color added. Nan for engagements is often colored pink and yellow.

== Cultural significance ==
In Uzbek culture, non has great cultural importance and is used in many ceremonies marking phases of life. Newborn babies have non placed under their heads to symbolize long life, and toddlers learning to walk have non placed between their legs to signify wishes of a blessed journey through life. Non is an essential wedding food, and on the day of the wedding, a bride and groom take bites of a non each, and finish it the following morning for their first breakfast as husband and wife. A similar tradition is also done when a son leaves for military service or to work or study abroad: the son will take bites of two non and they will be dried and hung on the ceiling until he returns.

Non is treated as an important object, and should not be placed on the ground or cut with a knife (it is almost always broken by hand). If non is dropped, it should be placed on a wall or in a tree for birds, and the phrase aysh Allah (God's bread) is spoken aloud.

== Names ==
- Kazakh, Kyrgyz: nan (нан), tandyr nan (тандыр нан)
- Tajik: non (нон)
- Turkmen: tamdyr çörek
- Uyghur: nan (نان), tonur nan (تونۇر نان)
- Uzbek: non, tandir non
- Chinese: náng (馕; 饢)
- Russian: lepyoshka (лепёшка), tandyrnaya lepyoshka (тандырная лепёшка)

== Varieties ==
=== Obi non ===
Obi non or lepyoshka (лепёшка, "flatbread"), is a kind of flatbread in Afghan, Tajik and Uzbek cuisine. It is shaped like a disc and thicker than naan. Obi non are baked in clay ovens called tandyr.

=== Tohax ===
Tohax (тоқаш/toqash, токоч, توغاچ, Тоғач, Samarqand noni/Самарқанд нони), also known as toqach or toghach, is a type of tandyr bread consumed within the Xinjiang Uyghur Autonomous Region of China, as well as in many regions of Central Asia (Kazakhstan, Kyrgyzstan, Uzbekistan).

== Gallery ==
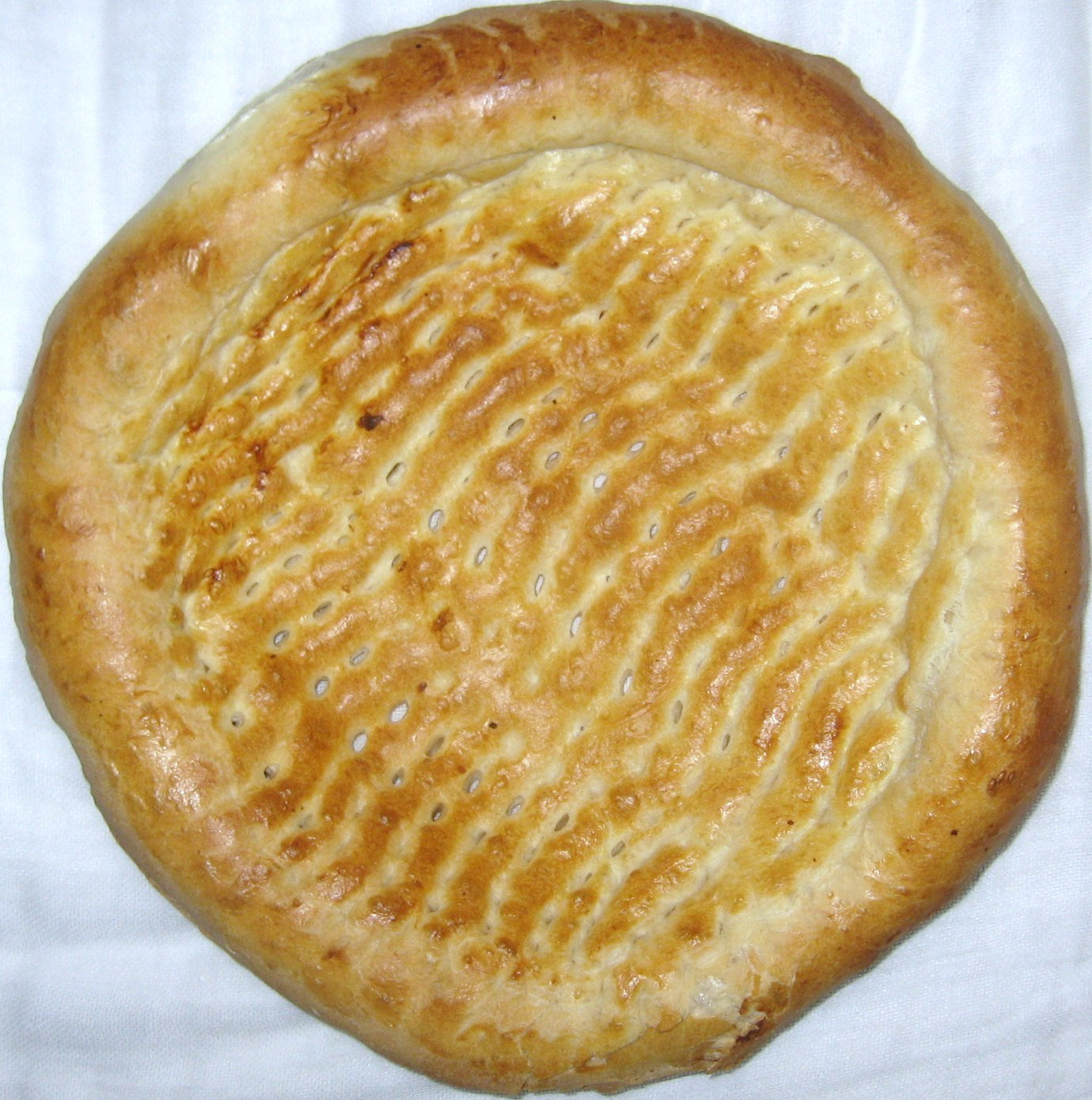
Chon-nan

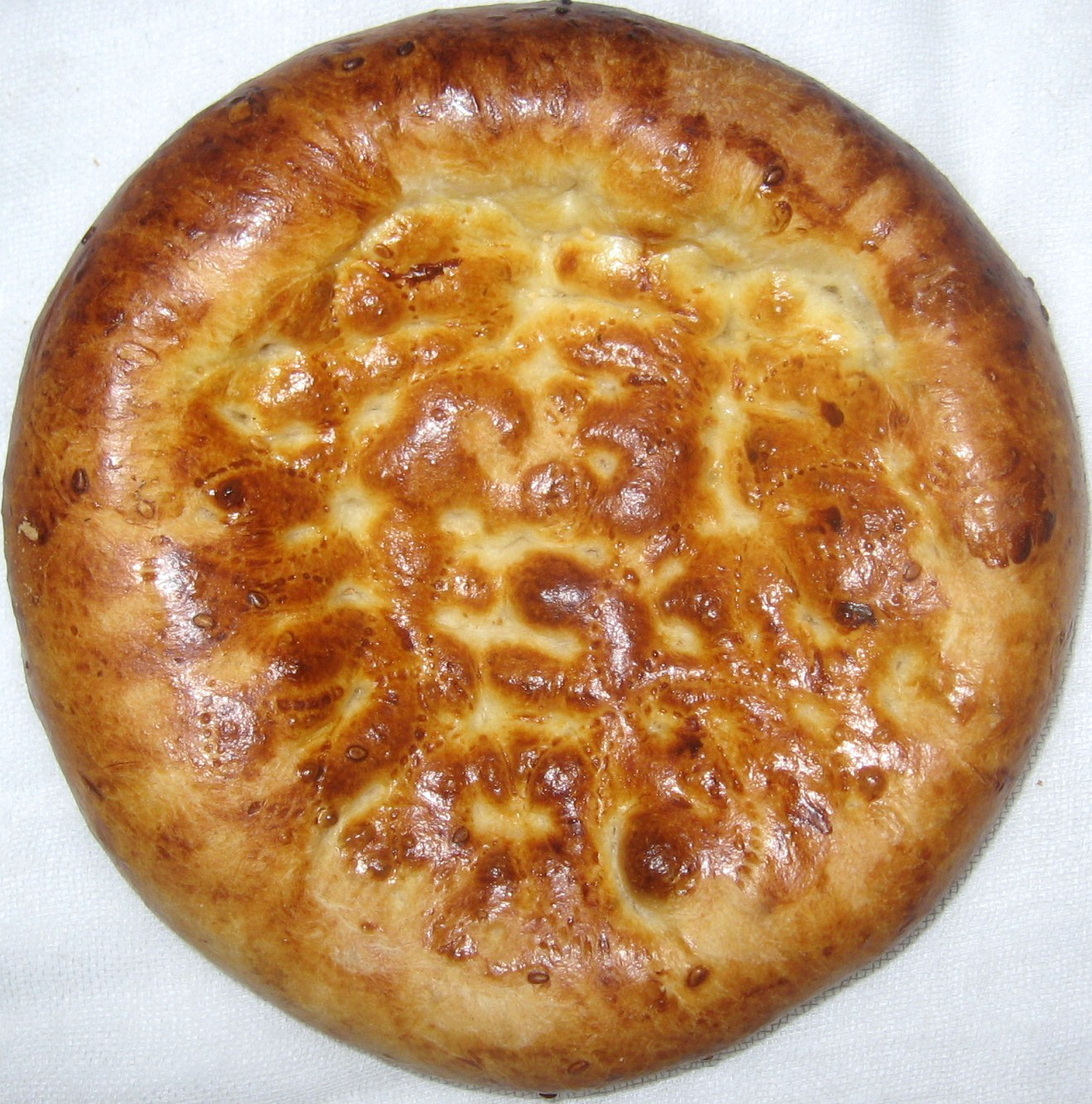
Pitir-nan

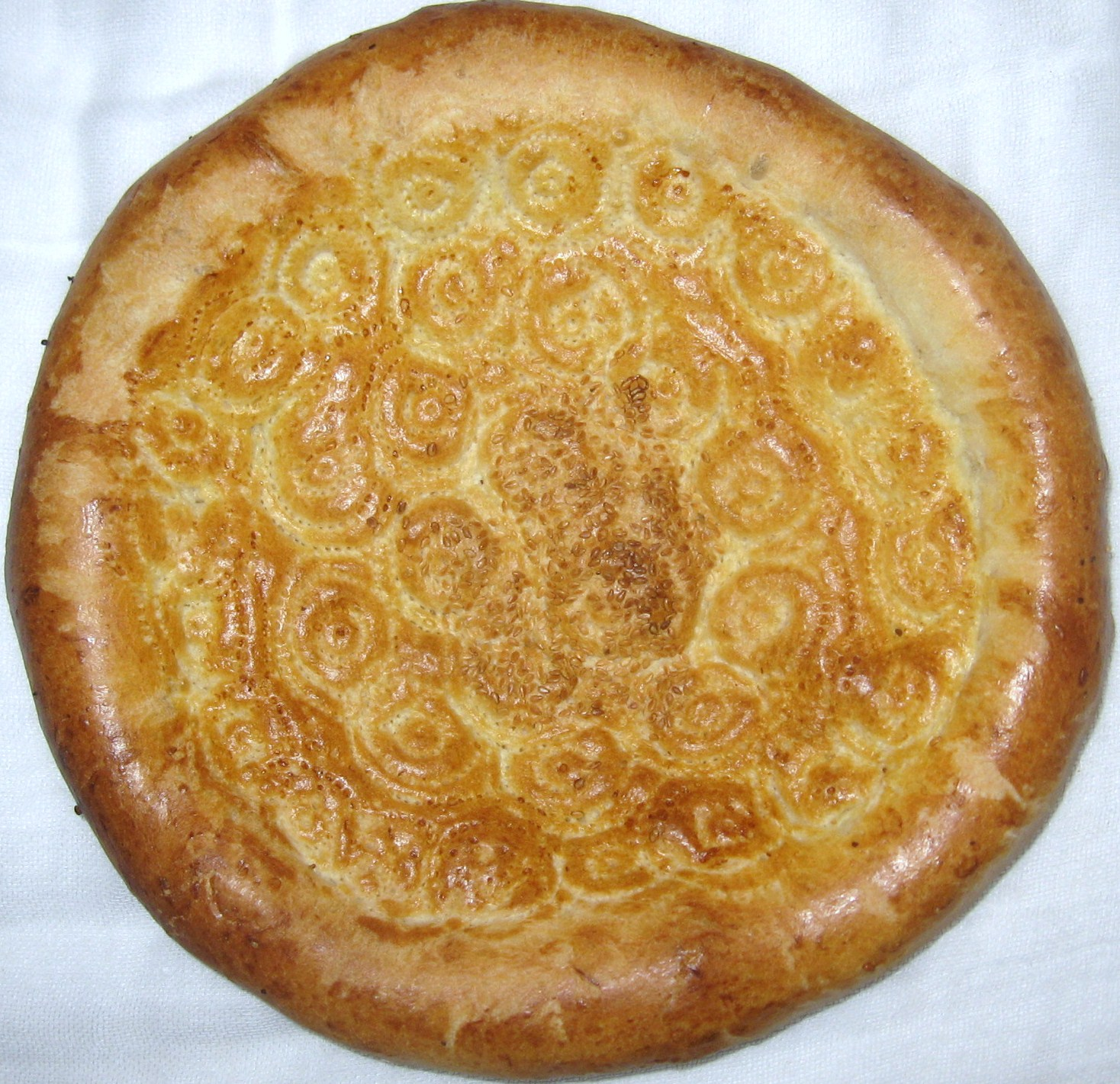
Pitir-nan2

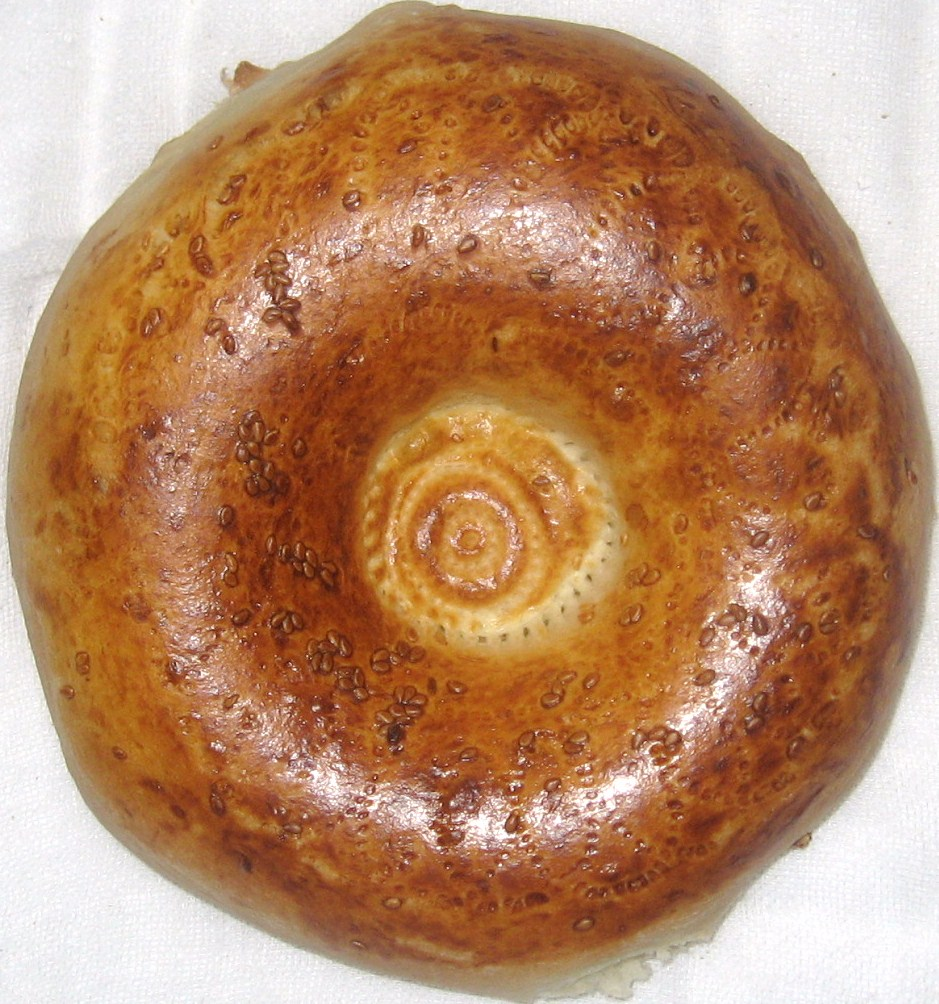
Tohax-nan

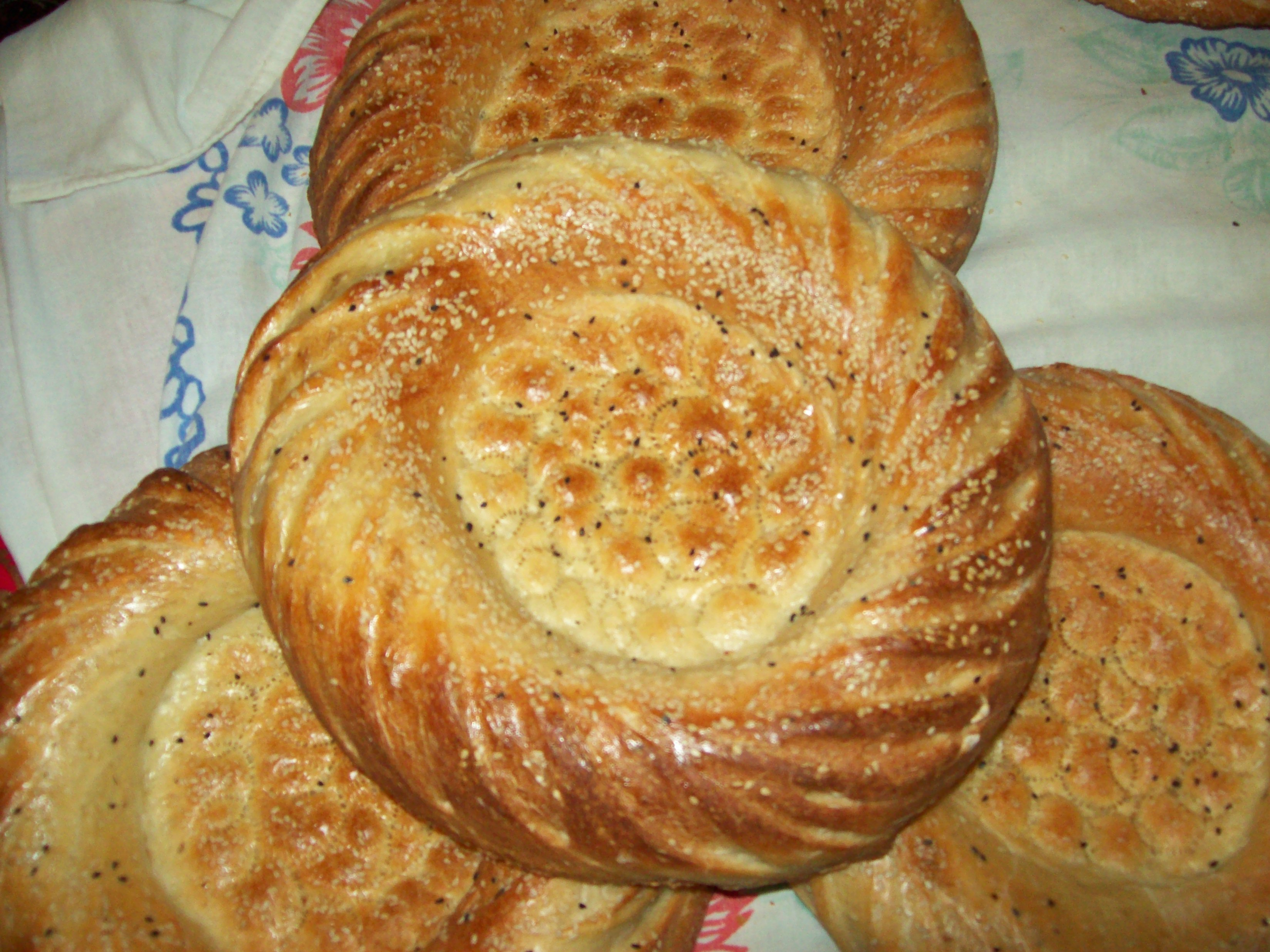
Tashkent-style non

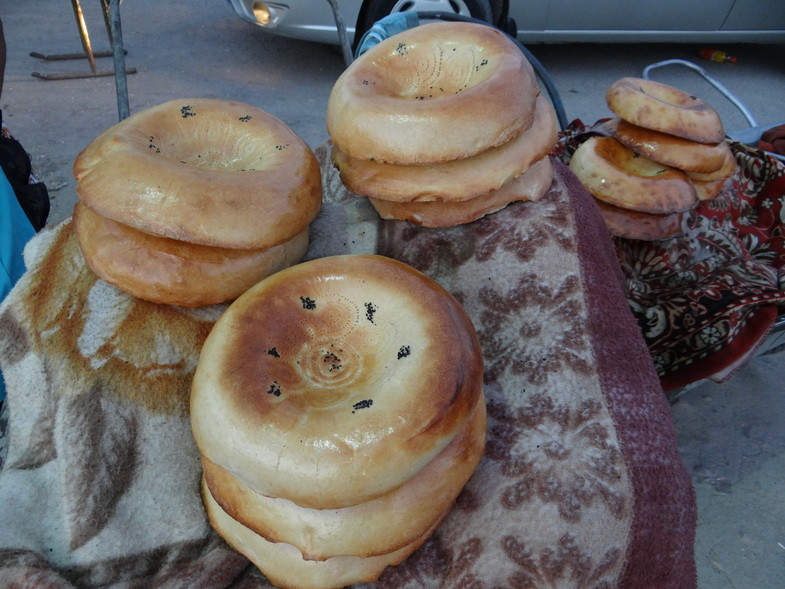
Samarkand-style non

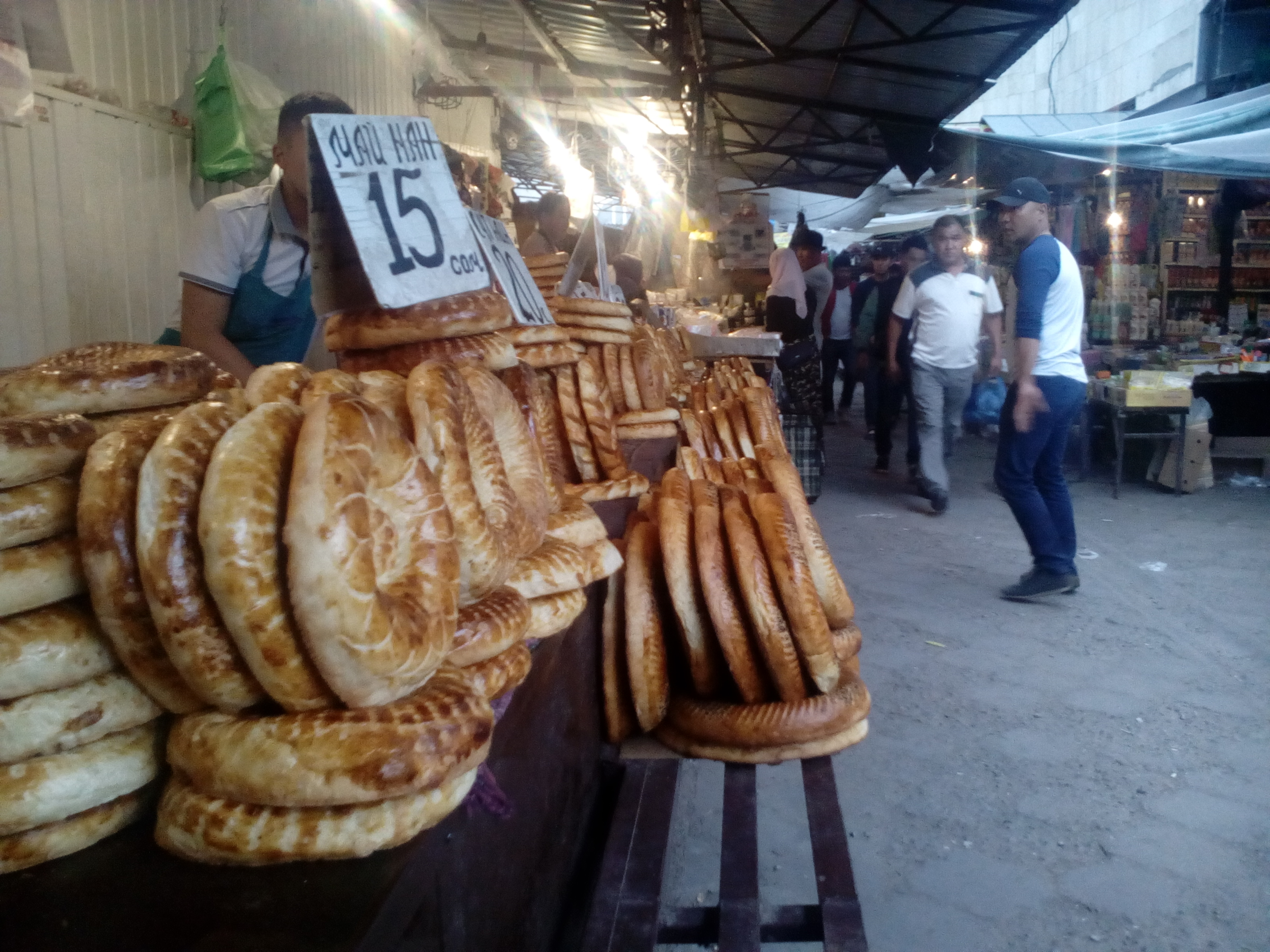
Tandyr nan sold in Kyrgyzstan

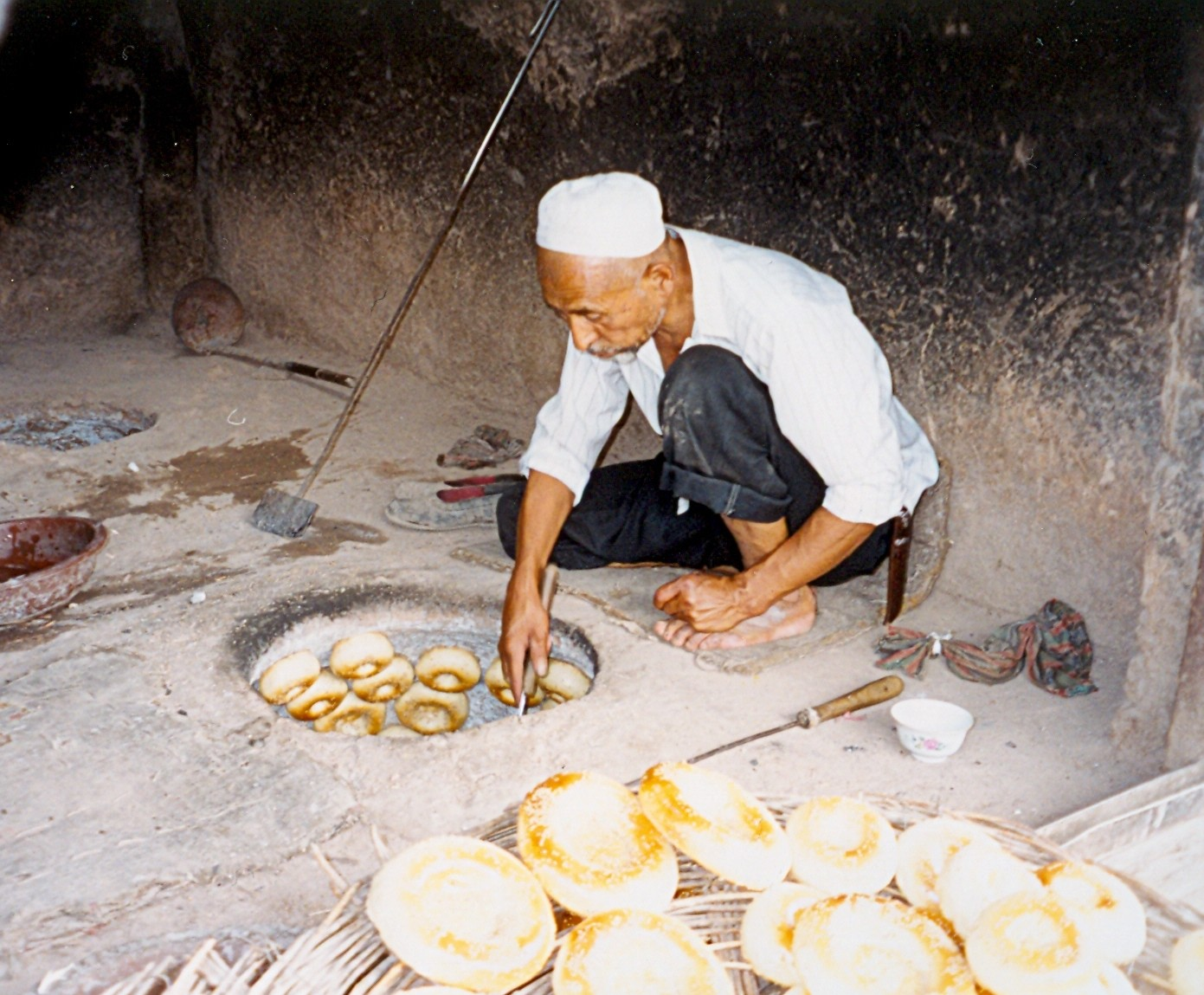
A Uyghur nan baker in Kashgar

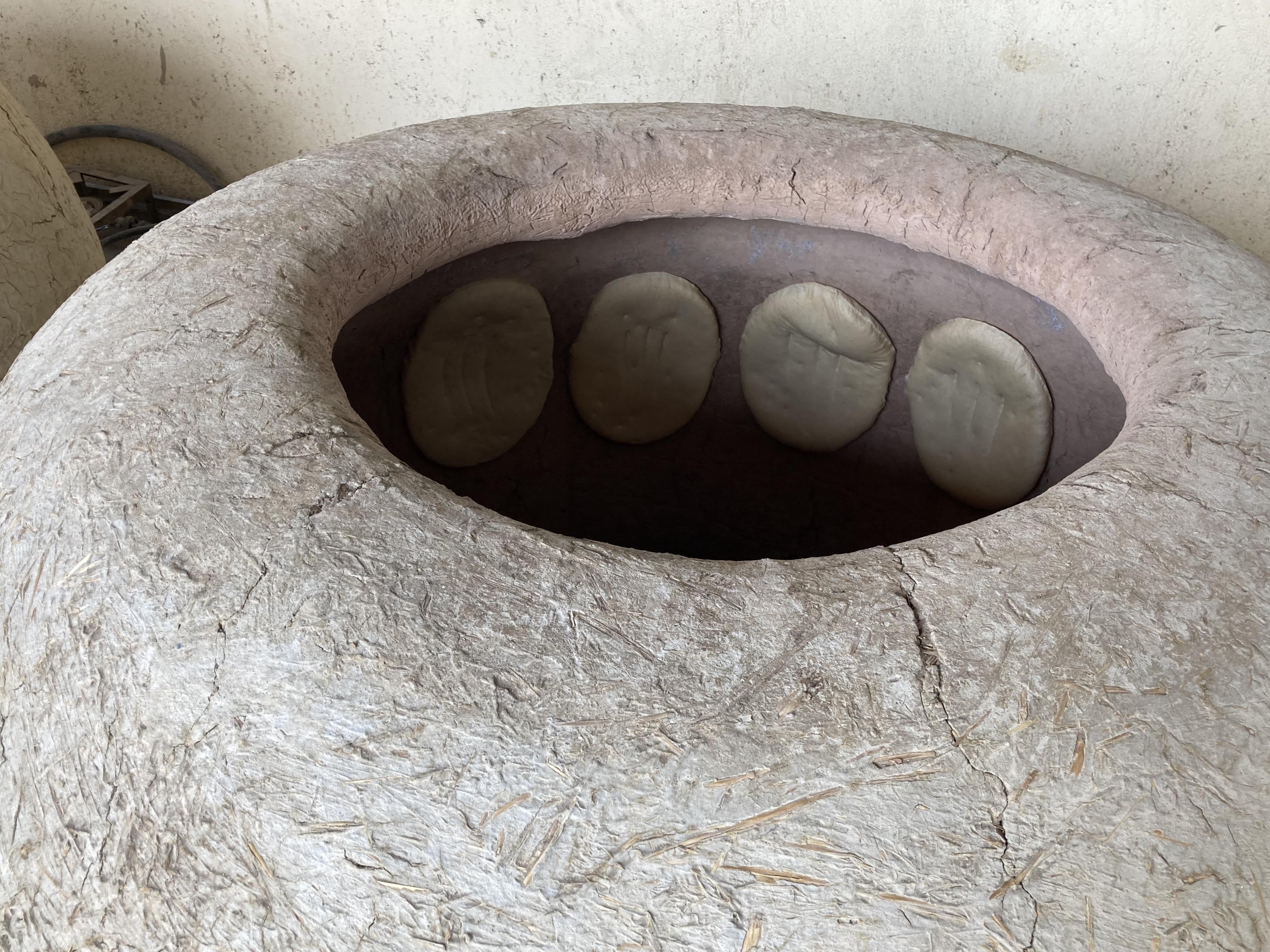
Baking çorek in a Turkmen tamdyr

== See also ==
- Bazlama
- Matnakash
- Naan
- Taftan
- Tonis puri
- Taboon bread
- Tandoori roti
- Çörek
- Shaobing
