= Naan =

Asian flatbread

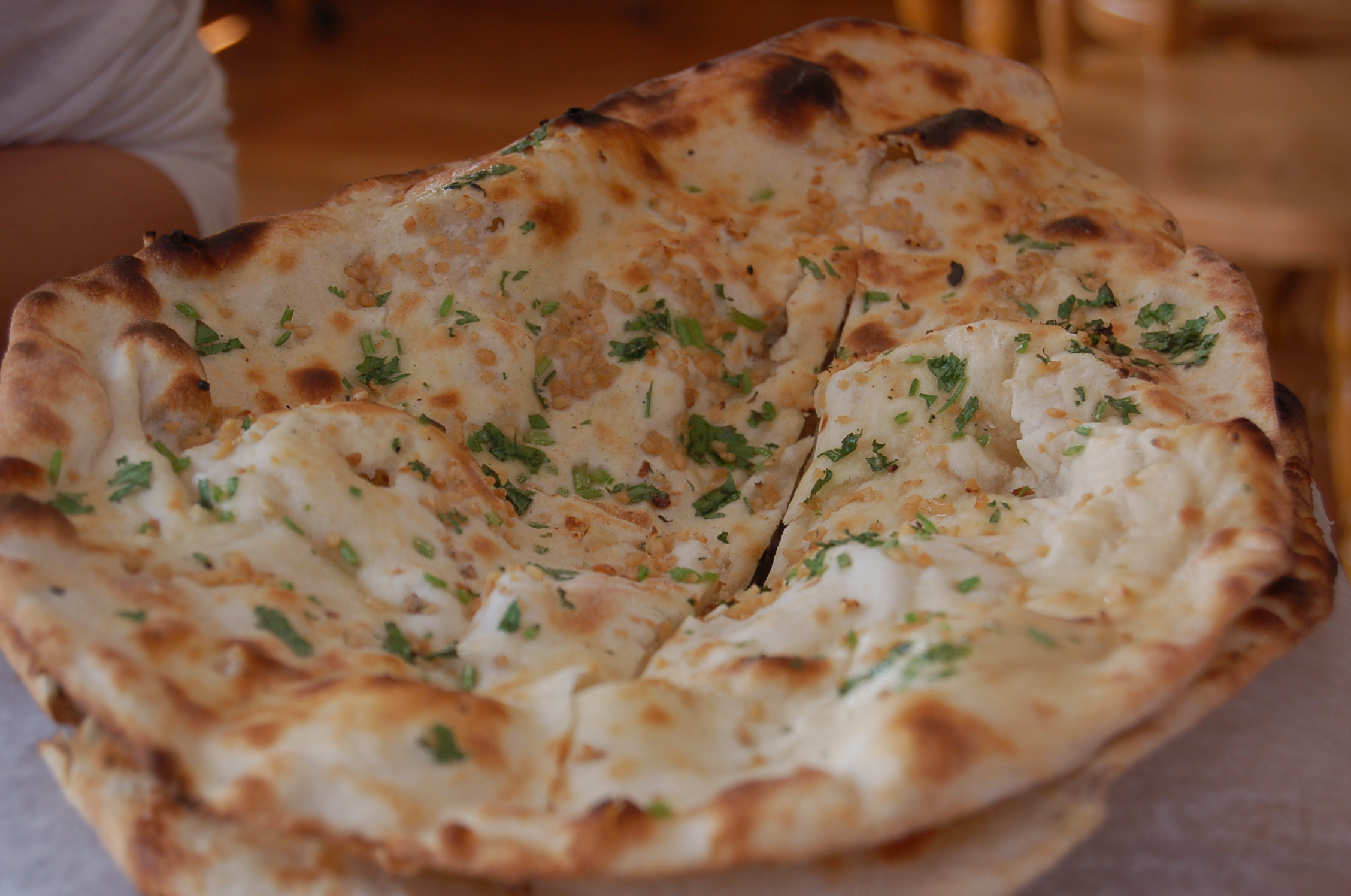
- Alternative names: nan, noon, paan, faan
- Region or state: Asia
- Main ingredients: Flour, yeast, salt, sugar, ghee, water

Naan (/nɑːn/) is a leavened, oven-baked or tawa-fried flatbread, that can also be baked in a tandoor. It is characterised by a light and fluffy texture and golden-brown spots from the baking process. Naan is used in many cuisines worldwide.

Composed of white or wheat flour and combined with a leavening agent, typically yeast, naan dough develops air pockets that contribute to its fluffy and soft texture. Additional ingredients for crafting naan include warm water, salt, ghee and yogurt, with optional additions like milk, egg, or honey. Baking powder or baking soda can be used instead of yeast to reduce the preparation time for the bread.

In the baking process using a tandoor, naan dough is rolled into balls, flattened and pressed against the inner walls, which can reach temperatures up to 480 °C (900 °F). This method allows the bread to be baked within minutes, achieving a spotty browning due to intense heat. Naan can be prepared on a stovetop using a tava. The pan may be flipped upside down over the flame to achieve browning on the bread's surface.

Once baked, naan is coated with ghee or butter and served warm. This soft and pliable bread accompanies meals, replacing utensils for scooping up sauces, stews, and curries, or with dryer dishes like tandoori chicken.

== Etymology ==
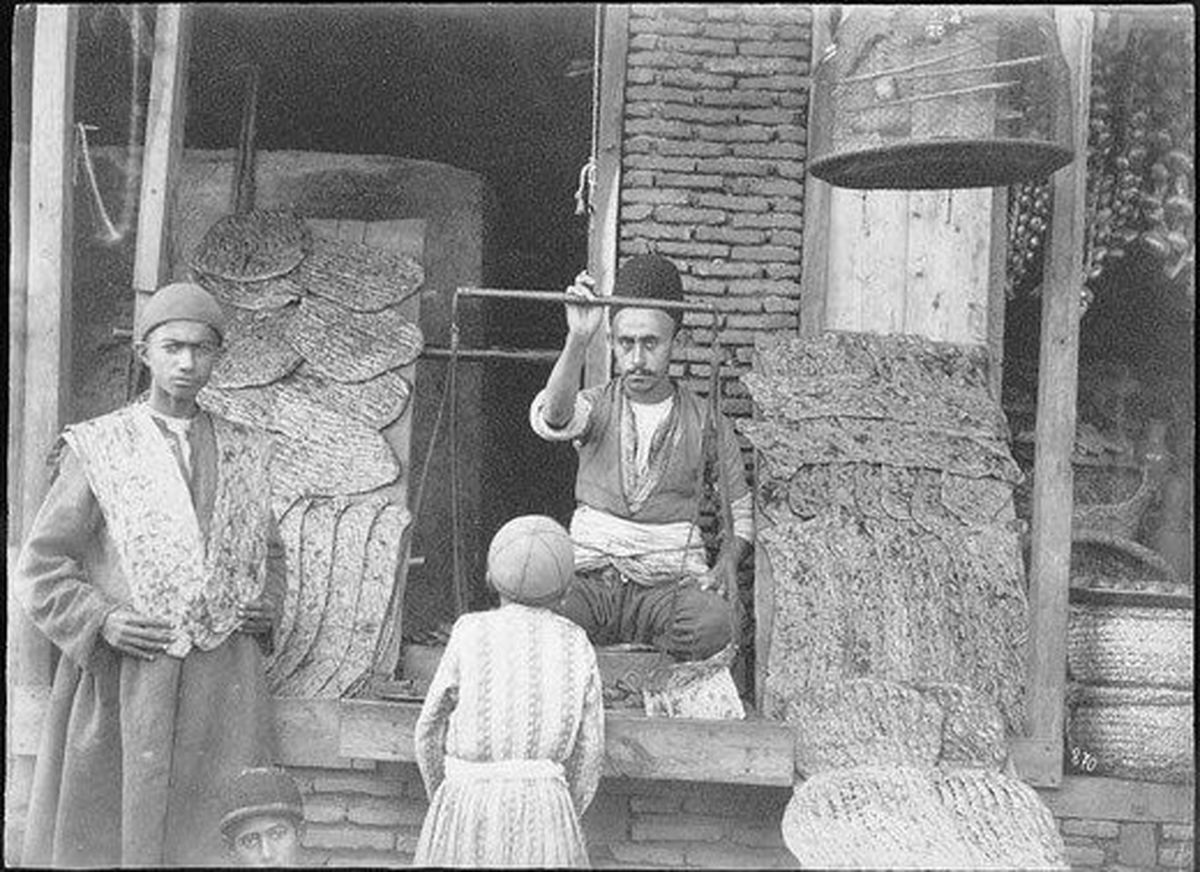
A naan bakery in Iran, Qajar era (circa 1880 CE)

The term "naan" comes from Persian nân (نان), a generic word for any kind of bread.

The earliest known English use of the term occurs in an 1803 travelogue written by William Tooke. While Tooke and other early sources spelled it "nan", the spelling "naan" has become predominant since the 1970s.

== Varieties ==
=== South Asia ===
Naan spread to South Asia during the Islamic Delhi Sultanate period. The earliest mention of naan in the region comes from the memoirs of Indo-Persian Sufi poet Amir Khusrau living in South Asia during the 1300s AD. Khusrau mentions two kinds of naan eaten by Muslim nobles; Naan-e-Tunuk and Naan-e-Tanuri. Naan-e-Tunuk was a light or thin bread, while Naan-e-Tanuri was a heavy bread and was baked in the tandoor. During the Mughal era in the 1520s, naan was a delicacy that only nobles and royal families enjoyed because of the lengthy process of making leavened bread and because the art of making naan was a revered skill known by few. The Ain-i-Akbari, a record of the third Mughal emperor’s reign, refers to naan being eaten with kebabs or kheema in it. By the 1700s, naan had reached the masses in Mughal cultural centers in South Asia.

=== Indonesia ===
In Indonesia, naan is a popular alternative to rice among the Indians, Arabs, Malays, Acehnese and the Minangkabaus, similar though not the same as roti or roti canai which was introduced from Tamils. This dish is known as roti naan or roti nan, and is cooked using Indonesian spices such as garlic.

=== Myanmar ===
Naan bya (Burmese: နံပြား) in Myanmar is traditionally served at teahouses with tea or coffee as a breakfast item. It is round, soft, and blistered, often buttered, or with creamy pè byouk (boiled chickpeas) cooked with onions spread on top, or dipped with Burmese curry.

External image
- A slideshow of Hyderabadi Kulcha / Naan / Sheermaal preparation images. Published on Flickr, retrieved 2023-02-06

=== China ===
The Jingzhou style of guokui, a flatbread prepared inside a cylindrical charcoal oven much like a tandoor, has been described as "Chinese naan". It is also an integral part of Uyghur cuisine and is known in Chinese as 饢 (náng).

=== Japan ===
After being promoted by Kandagawa Sekizai Shoukou in 1968, which is now the sole domestic manufacturer of tandoors, naan is now widely available in Indian-style curry restaurants in Japan, where naan is typically free-flow. Some restaurants bake ingredients such as cheese, garlic, onions, and potatoes into the naan, or cover it with toppings like a pizza.

=== France ===
In France, the classical naan has been revisited with cheese, to create Cheese Naan in Paris in the 1970s. The most likely origin is attributed to André Risser, who, concerned about the French reception of Indian cuisine in 1967, decided to fill naan with cheese spread. Another hypothesis attributes the creation of the variant, in Paris in 1976, to an Indian family from Bombay.

=== Elsewhere ===
In 1799, the word naan was introduced into the English language by historian and clergyman William Tooke. Today, naan can be found worldwide in restaurants serving Central Asian naan and in the cuisine of Kyrgyzstan, it is available in many supermarkets. Fusion cuisine has introduced new dishes that incorporate naan, including naan pizza and naan tacos and even huevos rancheros (an egg dish) served over naan. Naan pizza is a type of pizza where naan is used as the crust instead of the traditional pizza dough. Chefs such as Nigella Lawson, and supermarkets such as Wegmans offer recipes for people to make their own naan pizza at home, though it is certainly not traditional.

== Gallery ==
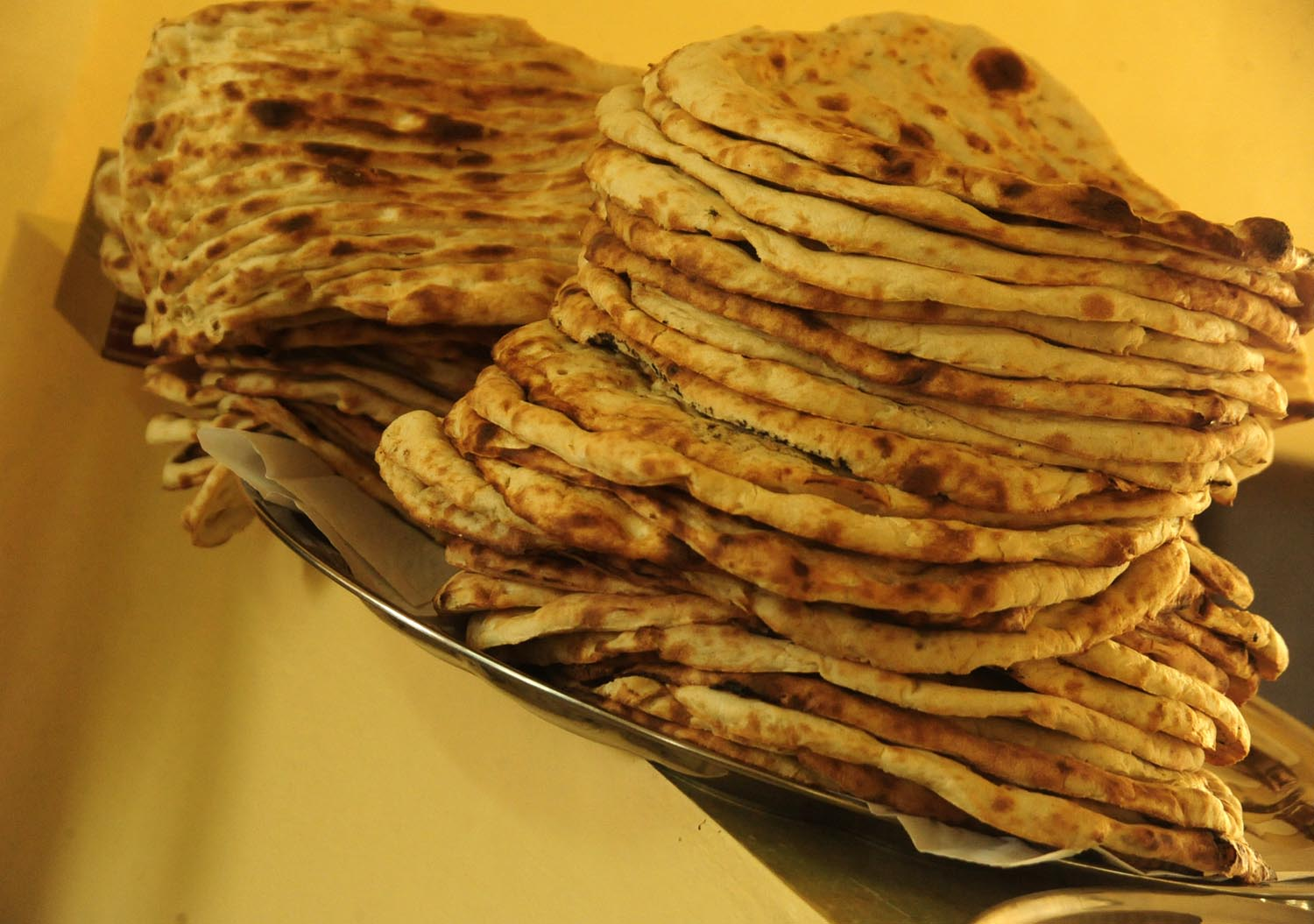
Nan in Afghanistan

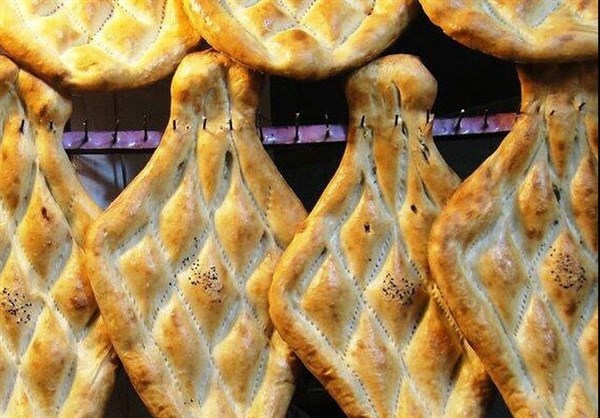
Nan in Kabul, Afghanistan

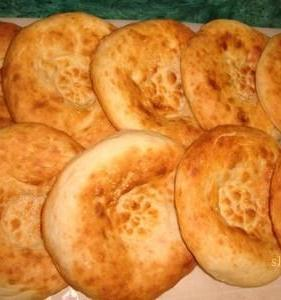
Nan in Mazar-e Sharif, Afghanistan

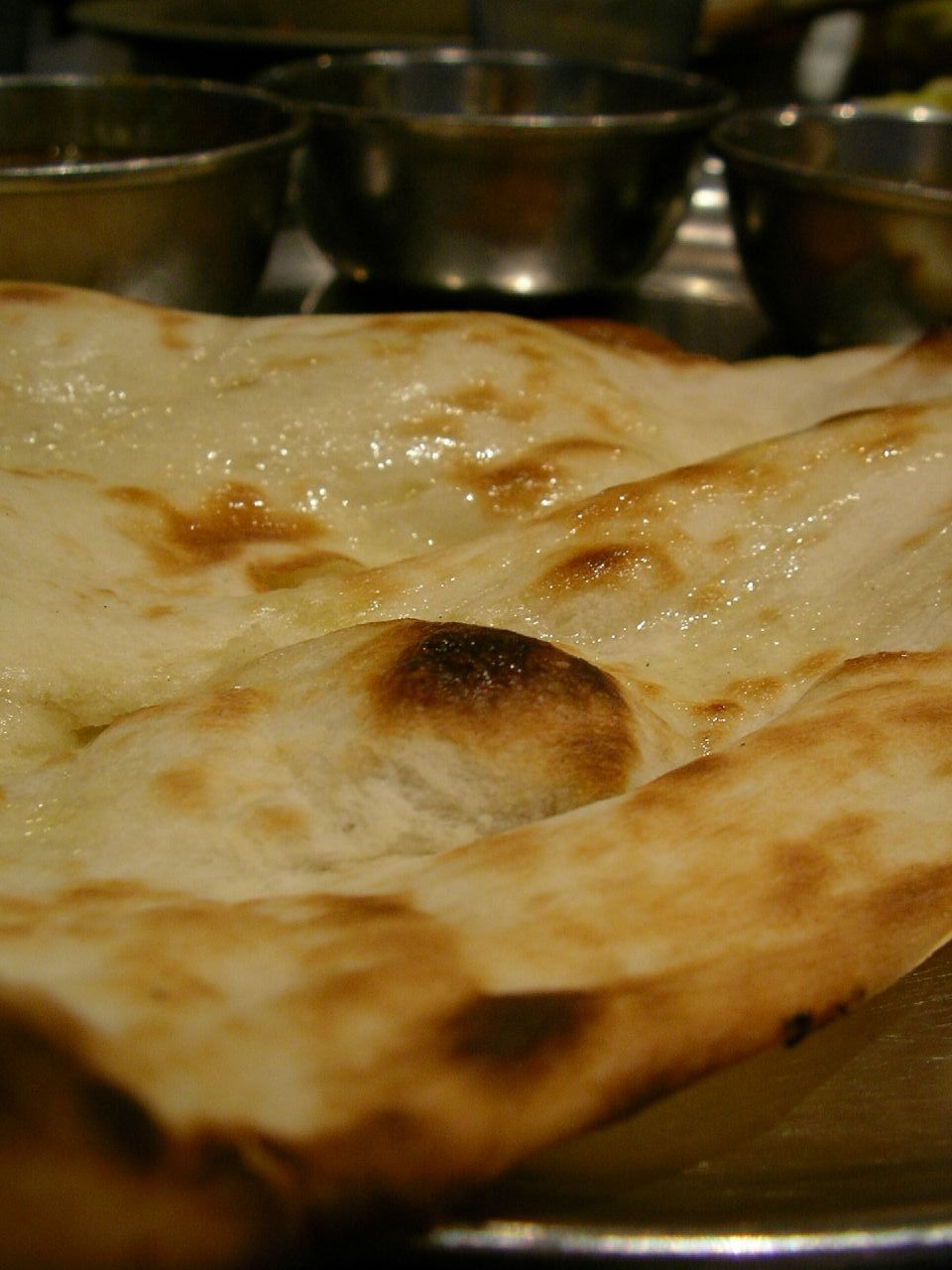
Indian naan baked in the tandoor

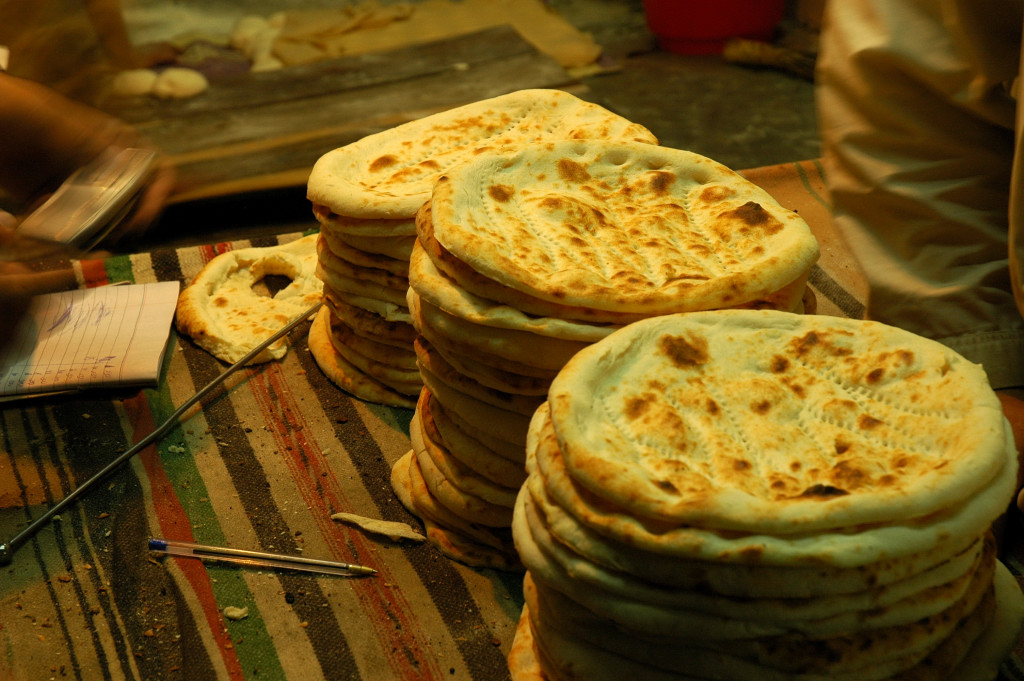
Tandoor-baked naan in Karachi

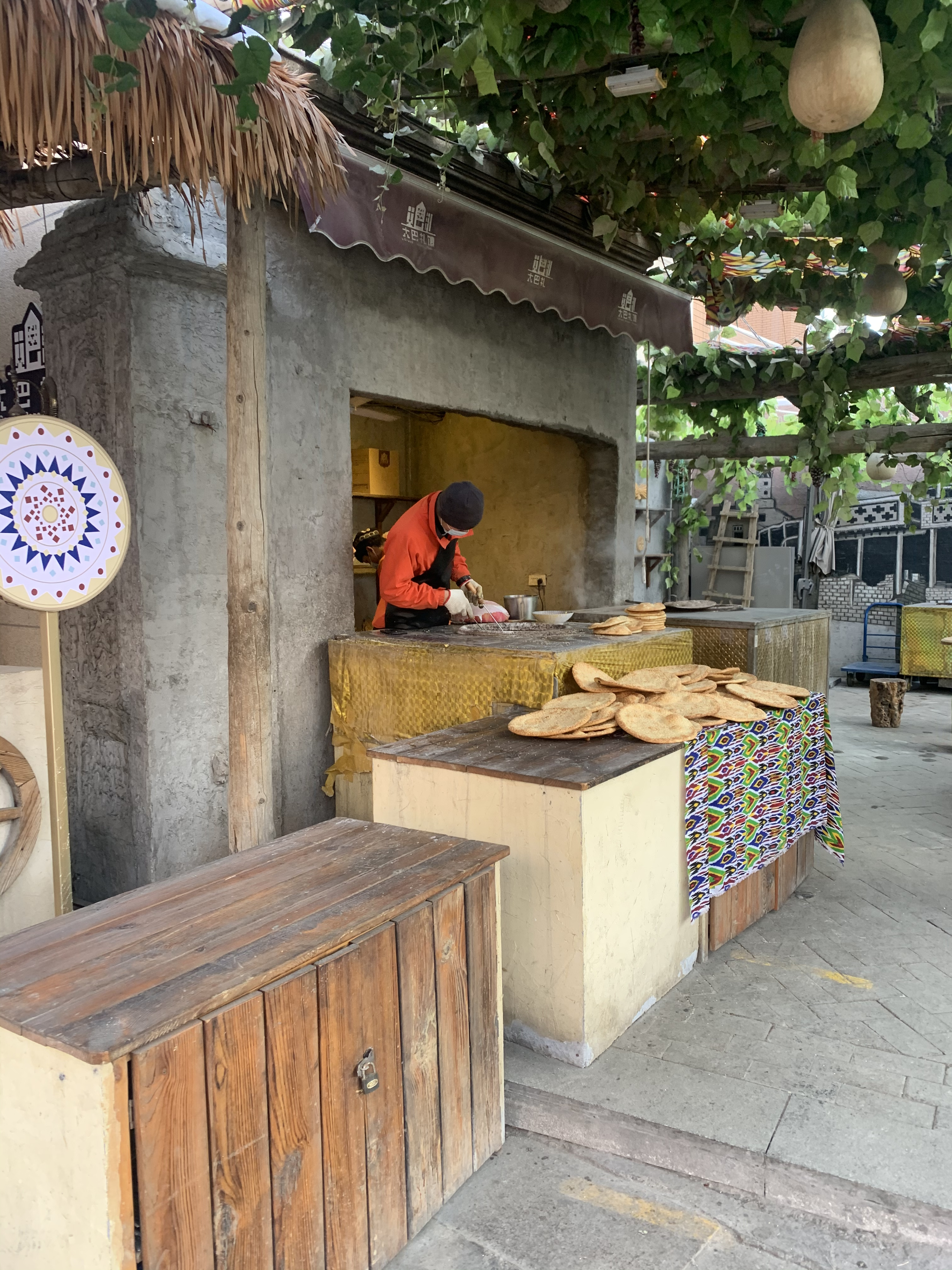
A Uyghur naan store in Ürümqi, China

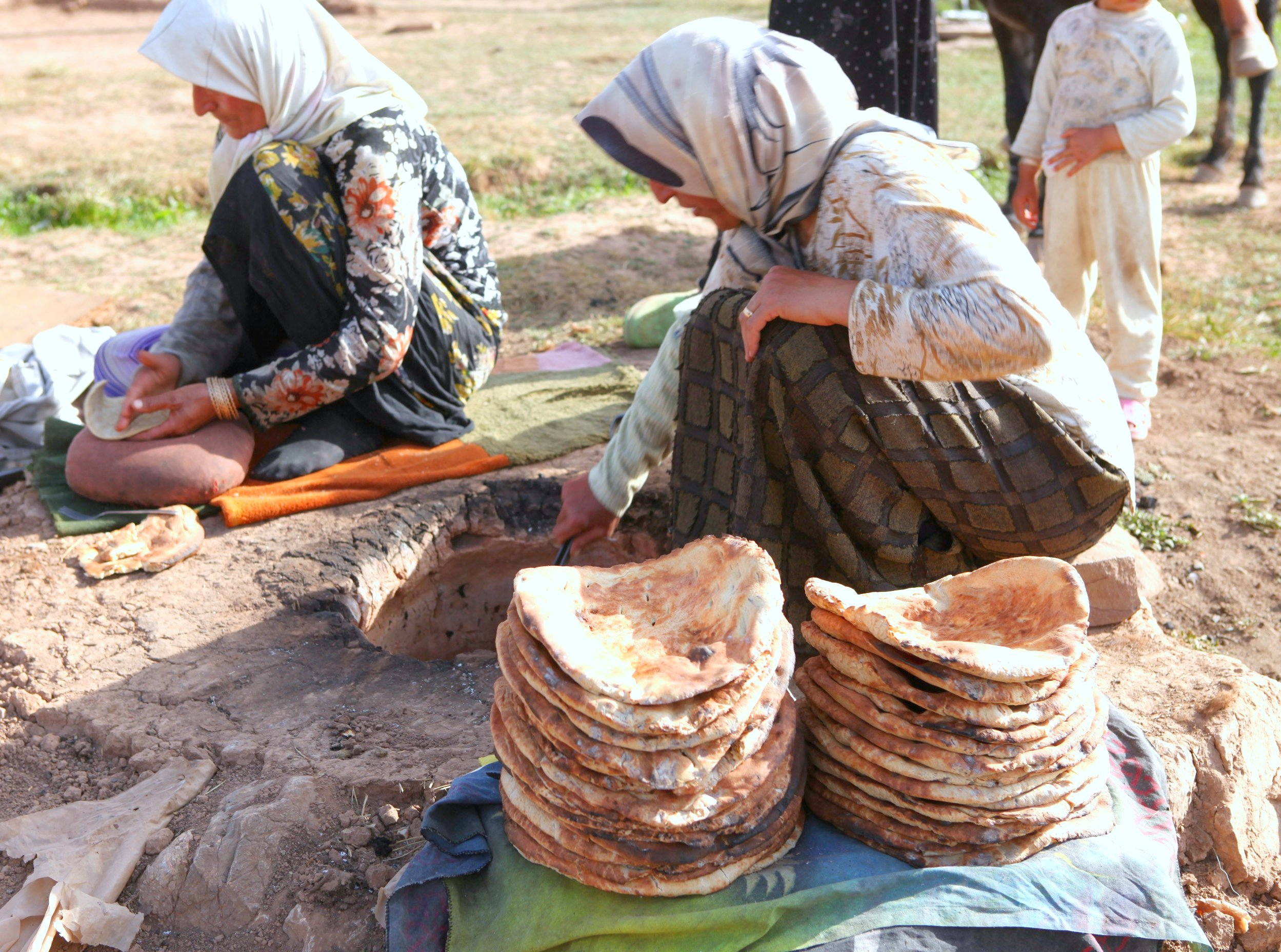
Nan in Iran

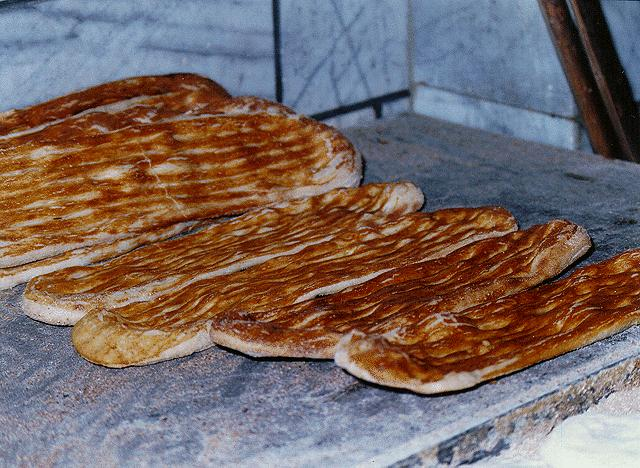
Nân-e barbari in Iran

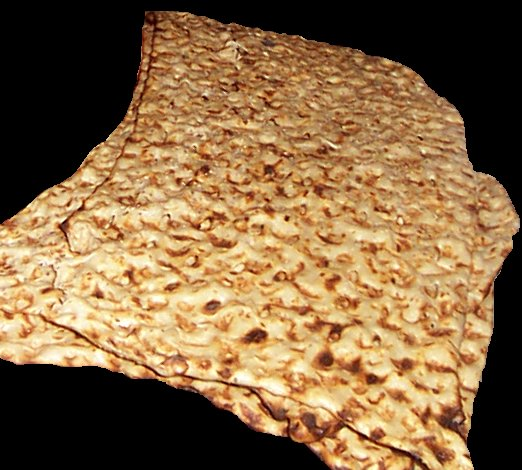
Nân-e sangak in Iran

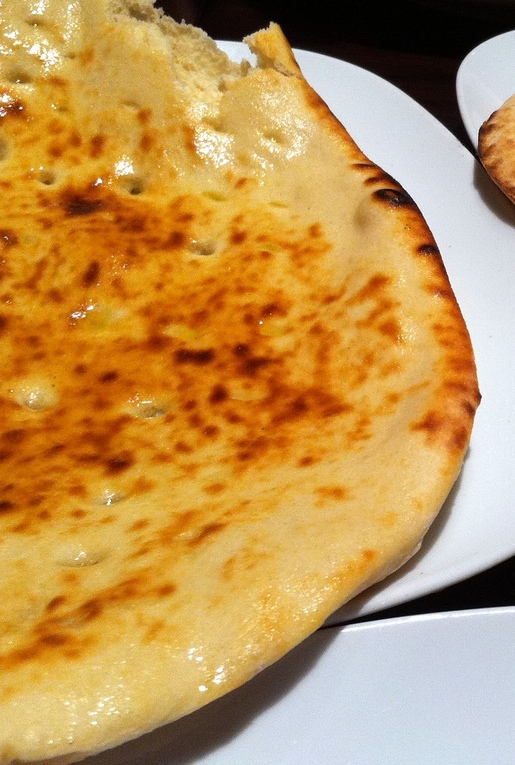
Nân-e tâftun in Iran

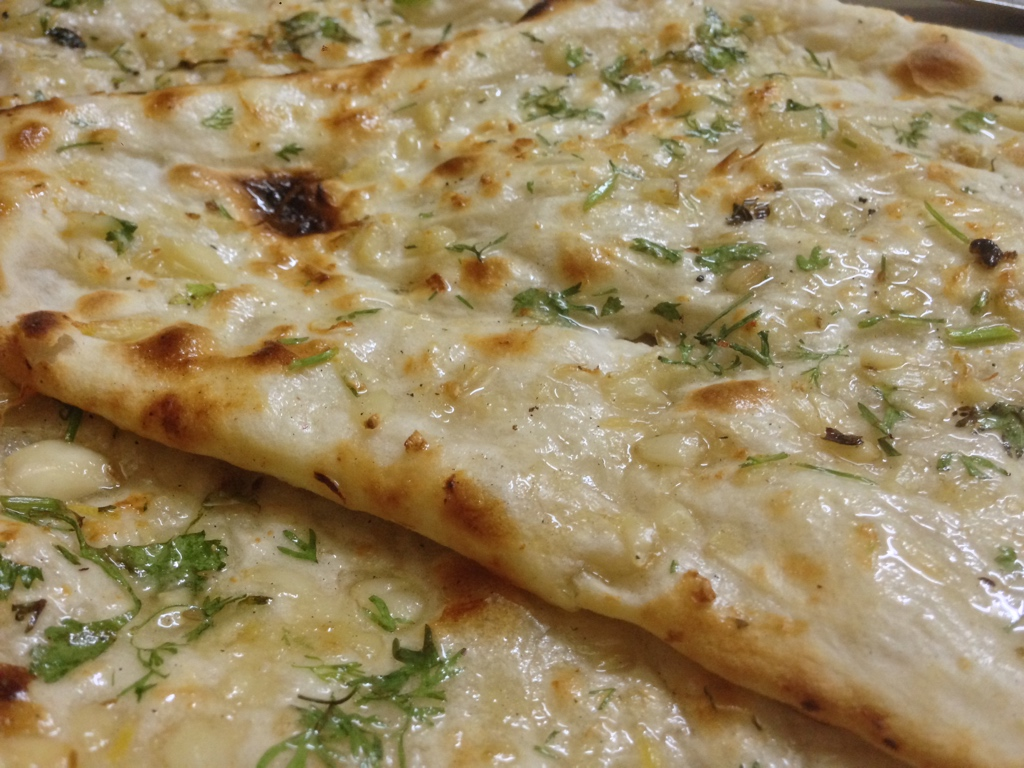
Butter garlic naan

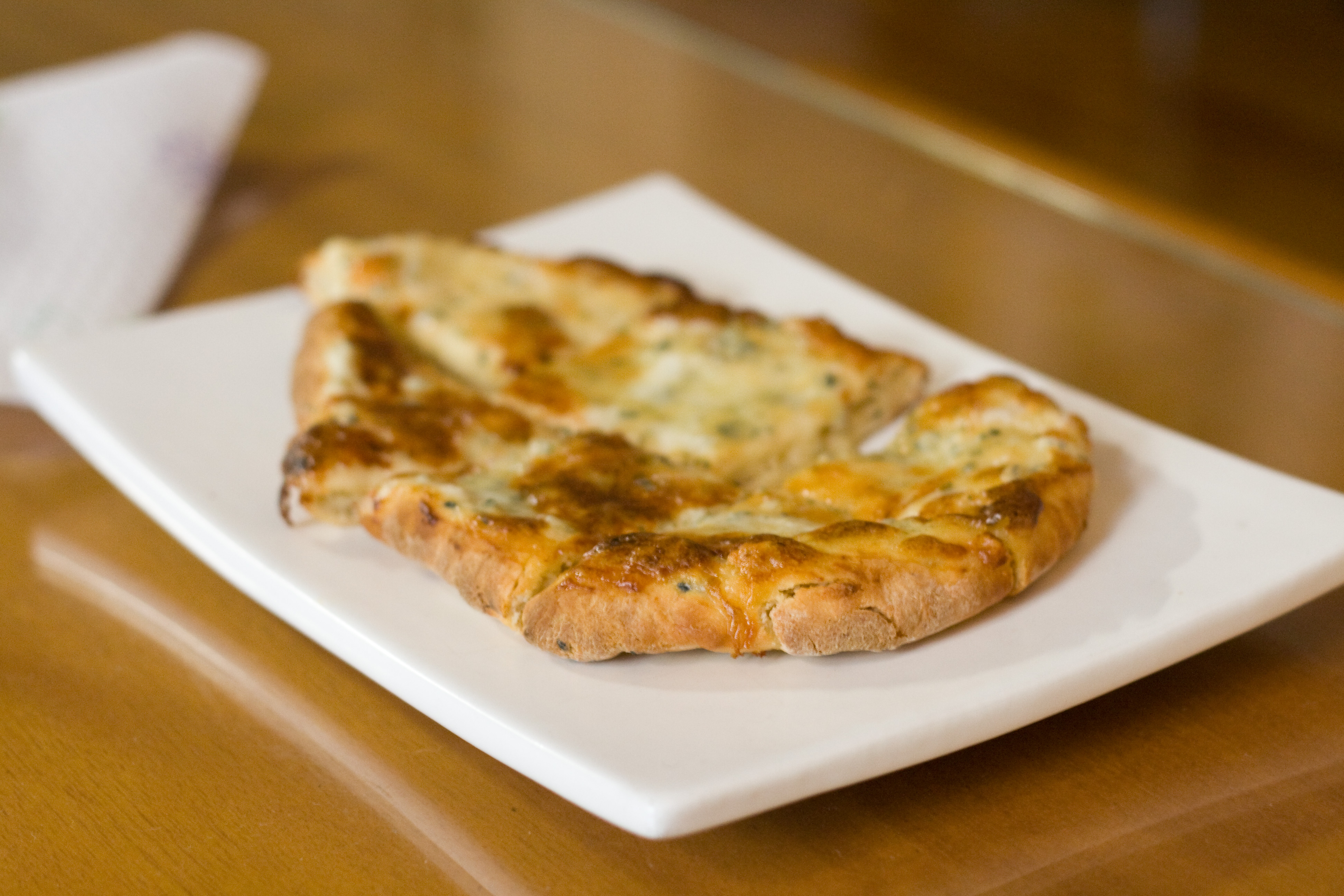
Paneer (cheese) naan

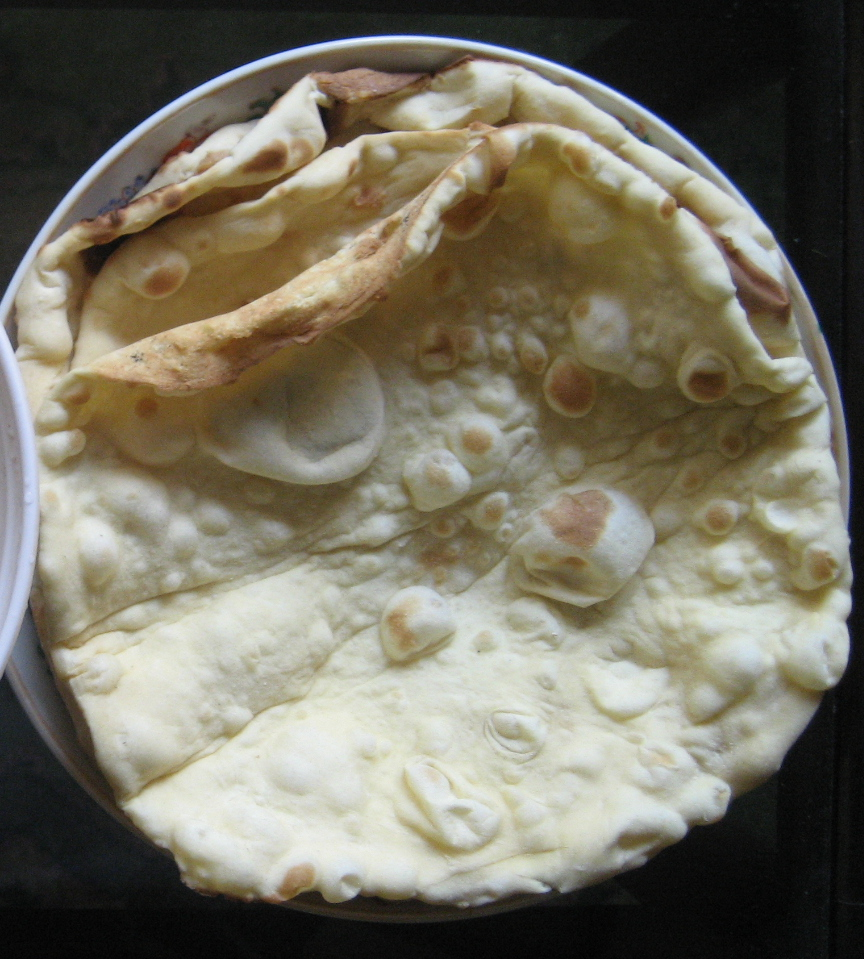
Burmese nan bya

== See also ==
- Iranian naans
  - Sangak
  - Taftoon
  - Barbari
  - Lavash
- Tandoor bread
  - Tandoori roti
  - Tandoori paratha
  - Tandyr nan
- Bazlama
- Shotis puri
- Tonis puri
- Matnakash
- Paratha
- Parotta
- Afghan bread
- Indian breads
- Pakistani breads
- List of Pakistani breads
- List of Indian breads
