= Shoti =

Type of traditional Georgian bread

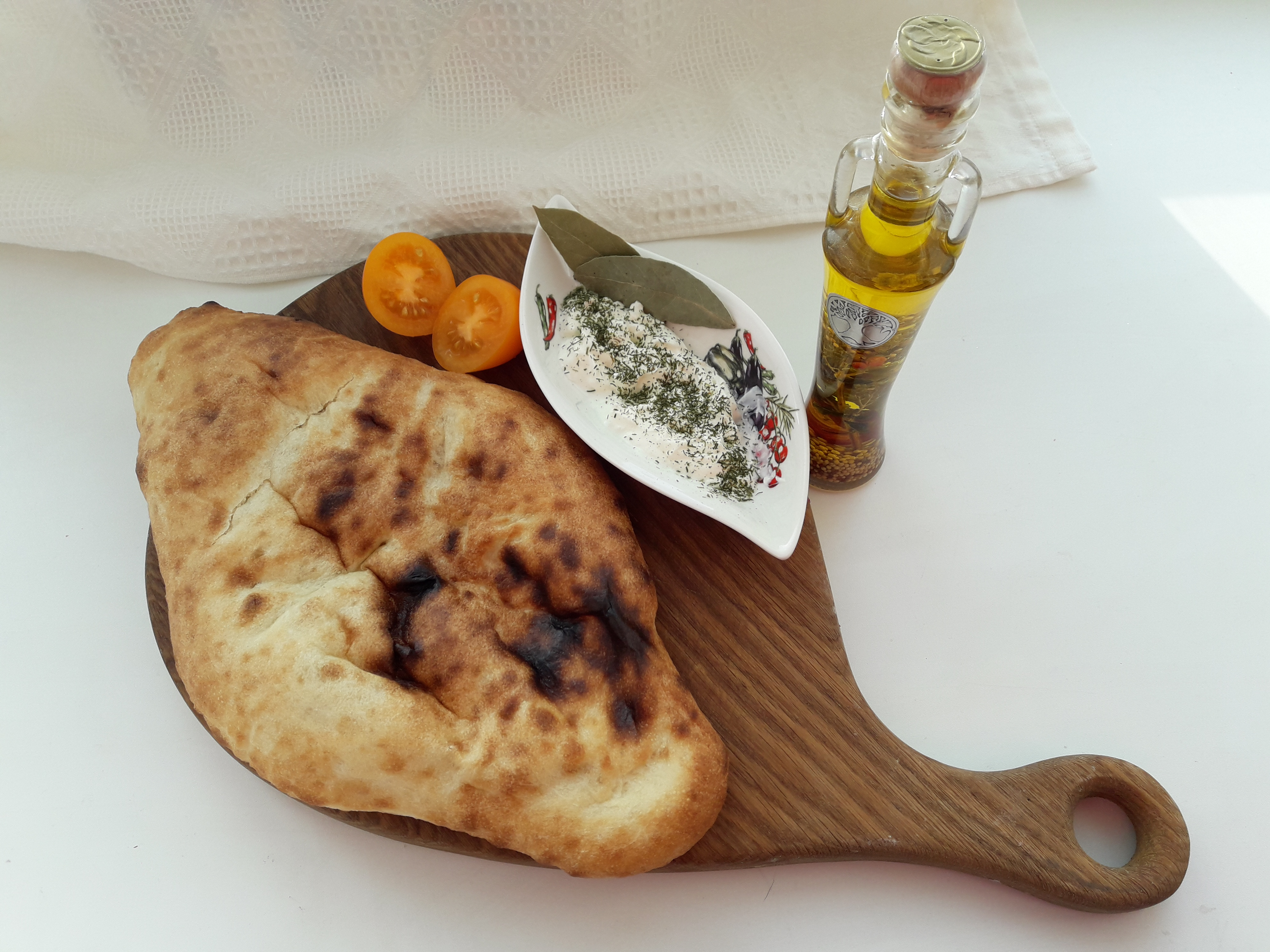
- Type: Bread
- Place of origin: Georgia
- Region or state: West Asia, South Caucasus, Eastern Europe
- Main ingredients: White flour

Shotis puri or simply shoti (Georgian: შოთი) is a type of traditional Georgian bread, made of white flour and shaped like a canoe. Shoti is baked in a specific bakery called tone or torne/turne (old Georgian). The word is cognate with tandoor. The bread is served as any other bread, but it tends to be more popular on special celebrations such as Easter, Christmas, and New Year's Day, as well as birthdays and weddings. It gets its distinctive shape from the method of cooking, as long strands of dough are stuck to the inside of a traditional round well-shaped brick or clay oven.

== Gallery ==
Collection of Images

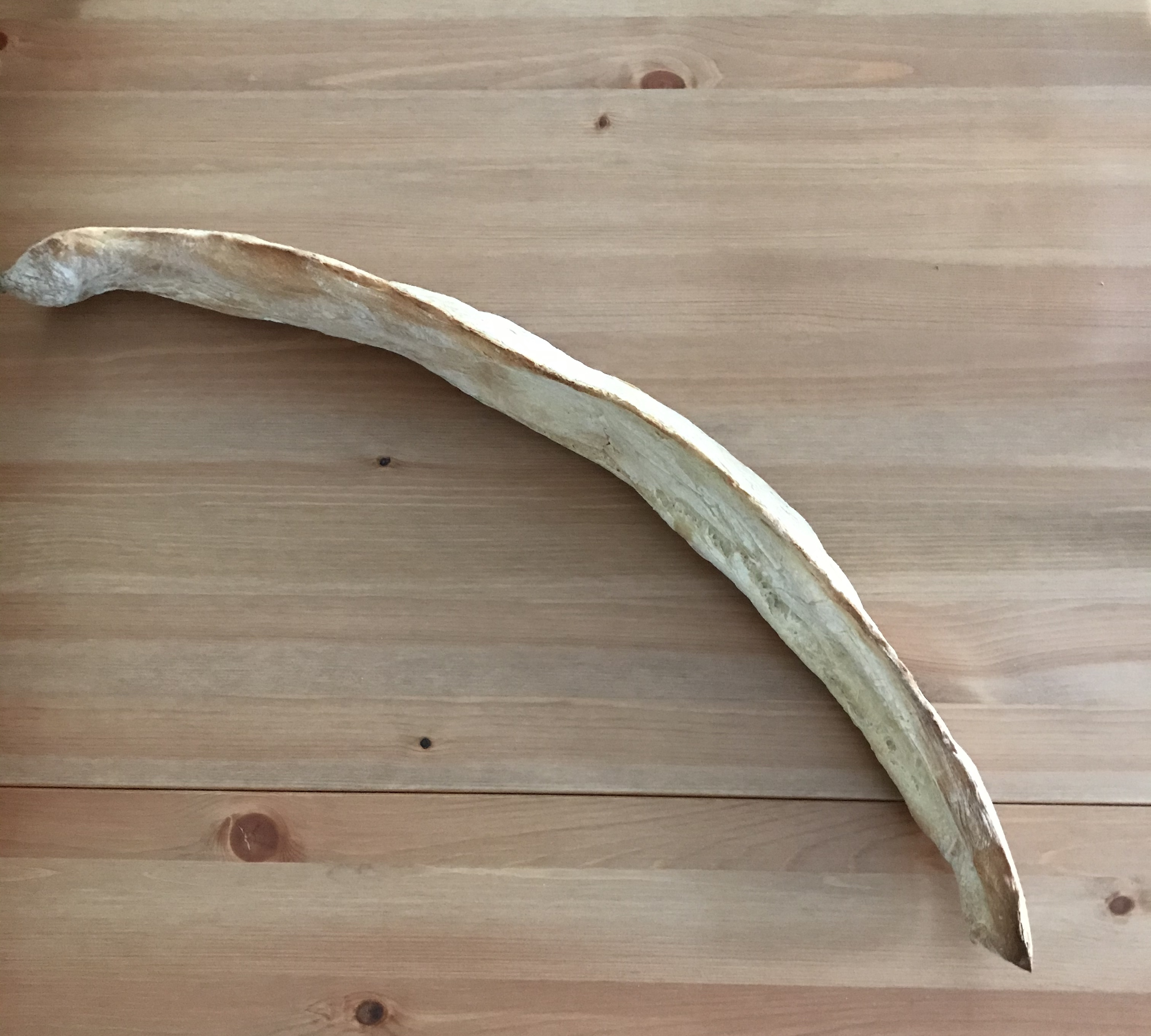
Kakhetian Shoti
"Dedas Puri"

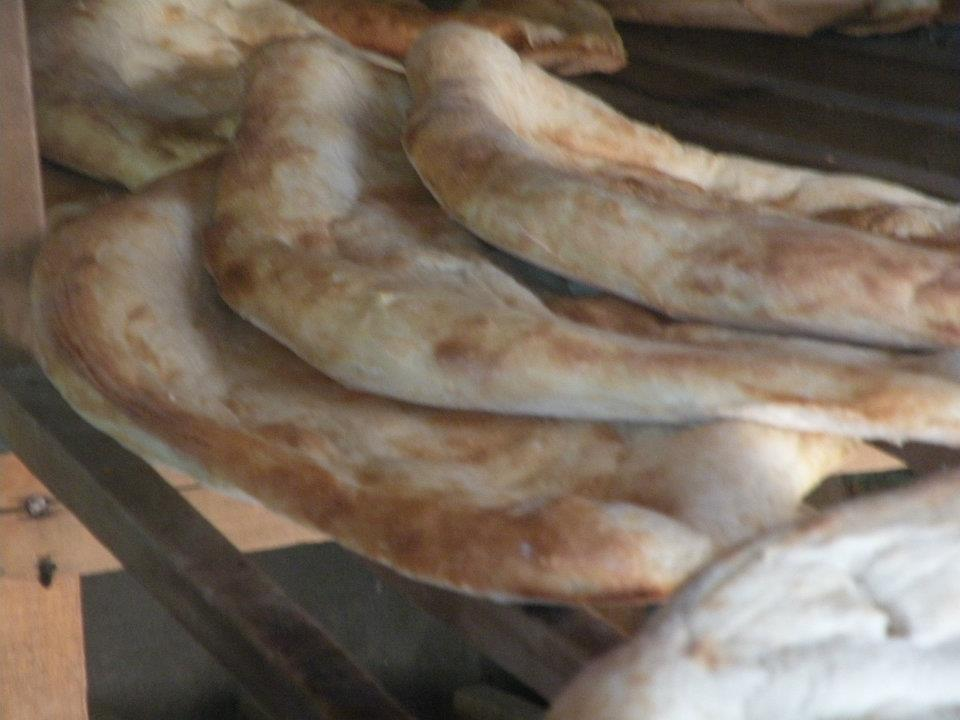

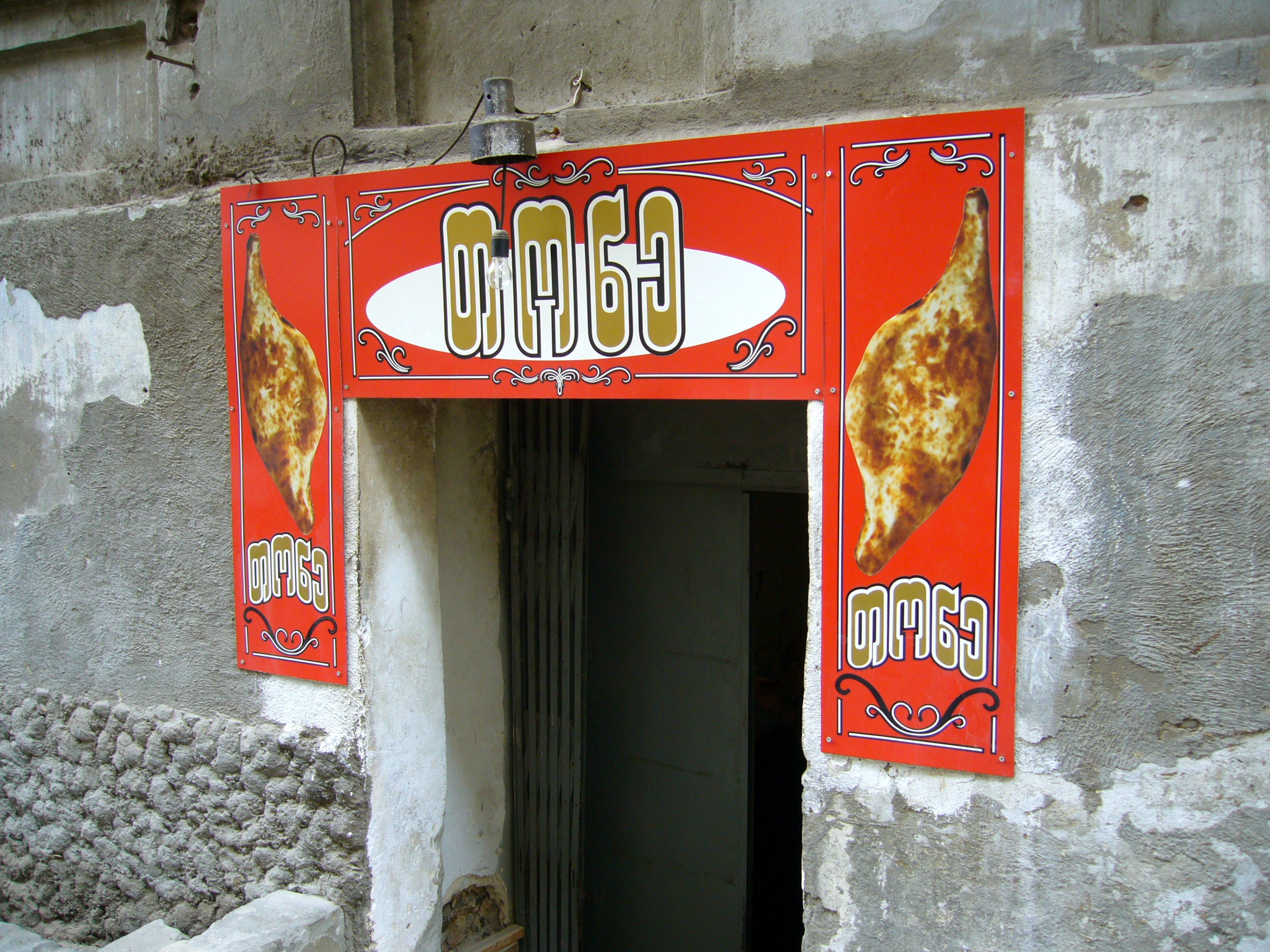
Tone in Tbilisi

== See also ==
- Tonis puri
- Naan
