= Tonis puri =

Type of Georgian bread

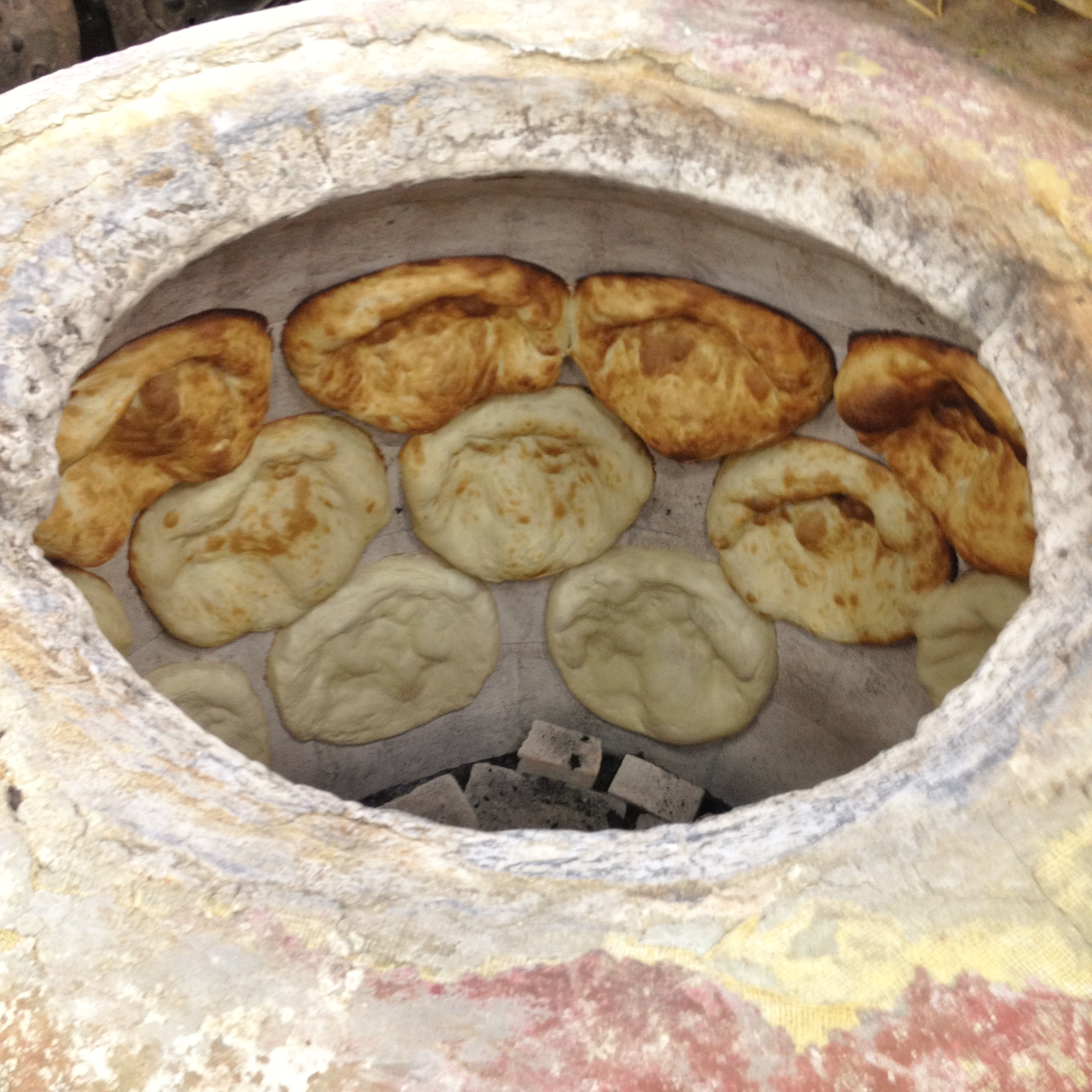
- Oven used to make traditional Georgian bread (tonis puri)
- Type: Flatbread
- Place of origin: Georgia

Tonis puri (Georgian: თონის პური) is a type of Georgian bread, baked in a specific oven called a tone or torne. The word is cognate with tandoor. The bread is served as any other bread, but it tends to be more popular on special celebrations such as Easter, Christmas, and New Year's Day, as well as birthdays and weddings.

== Photo gallery ==
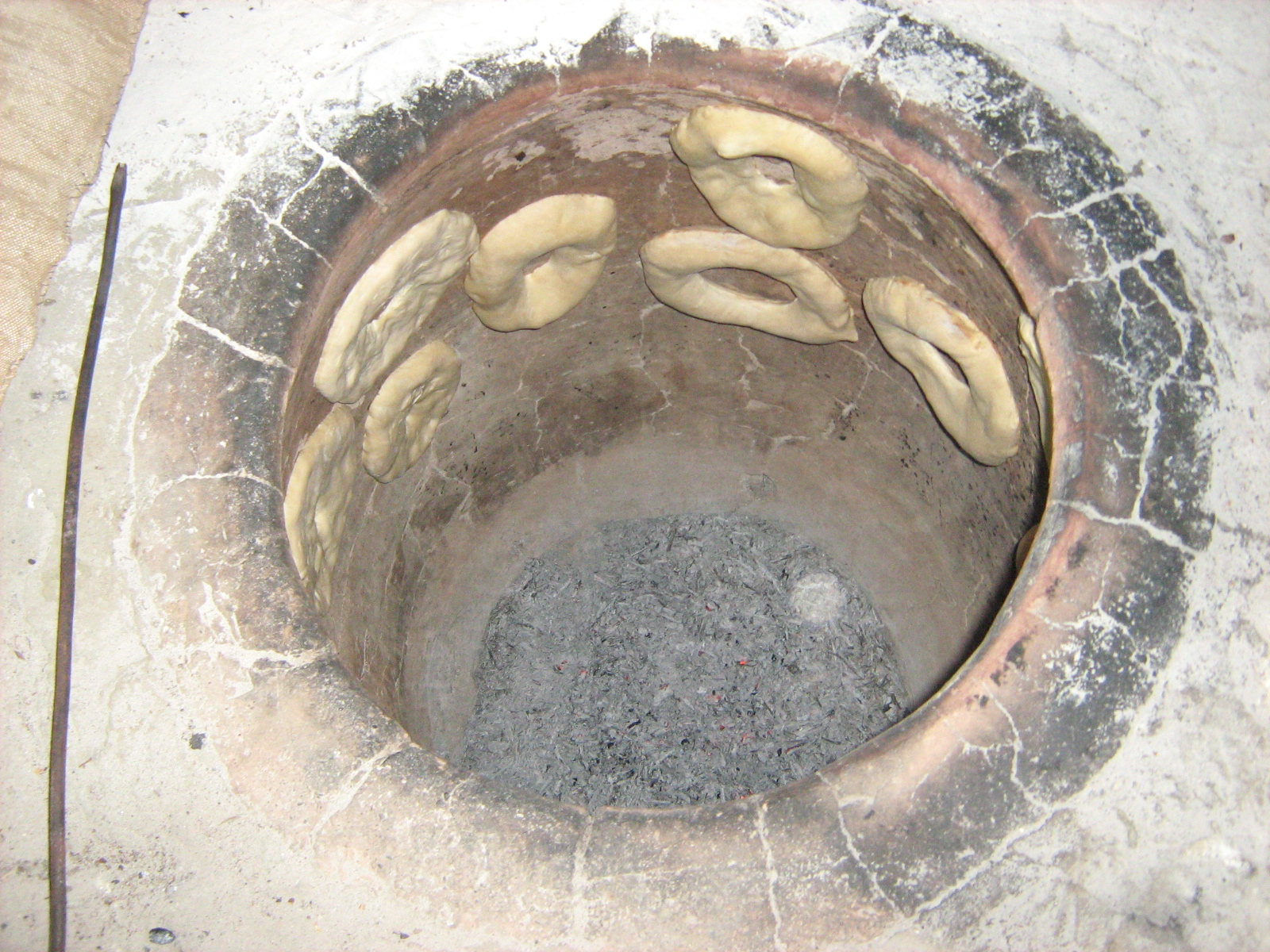

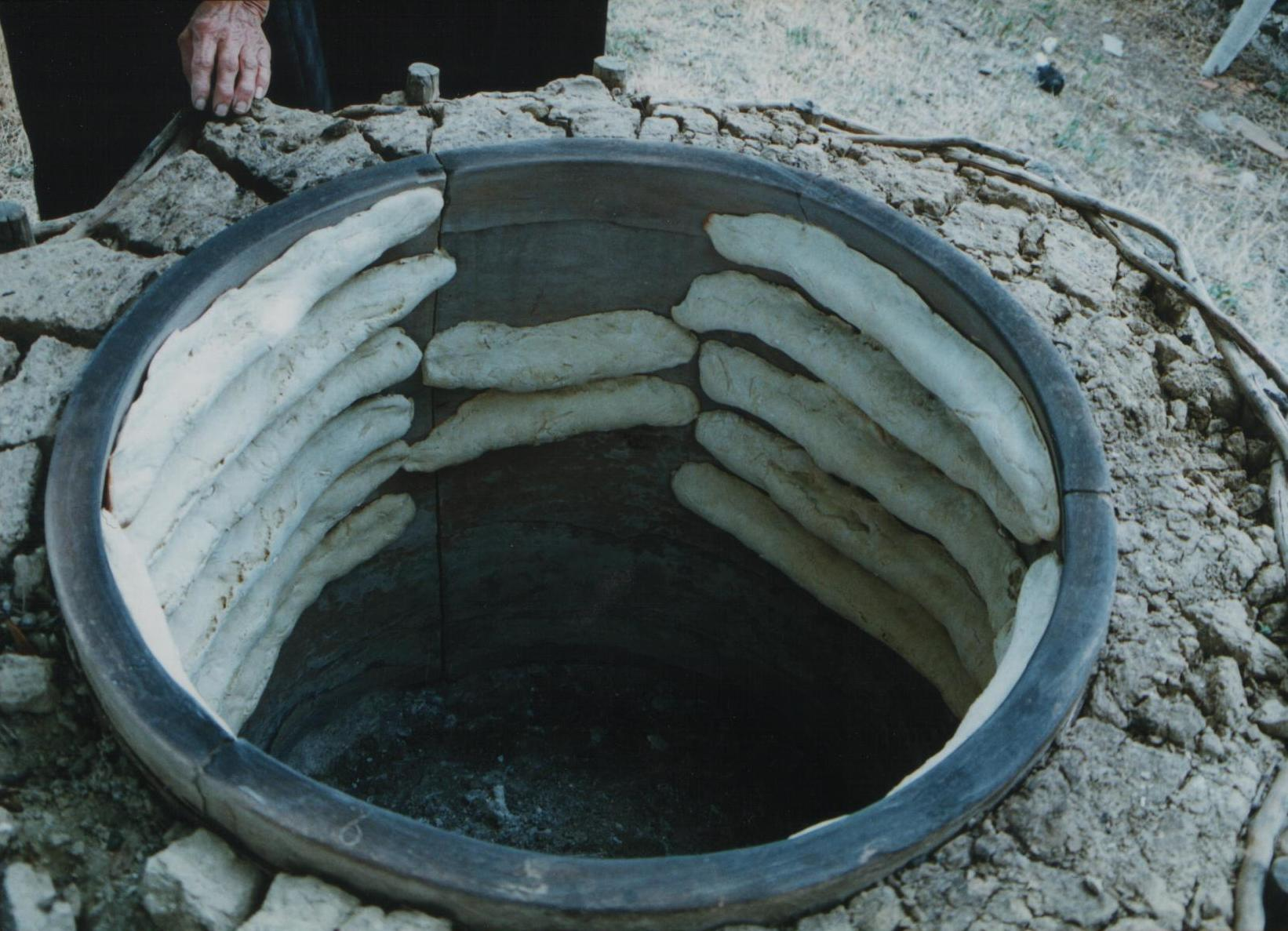

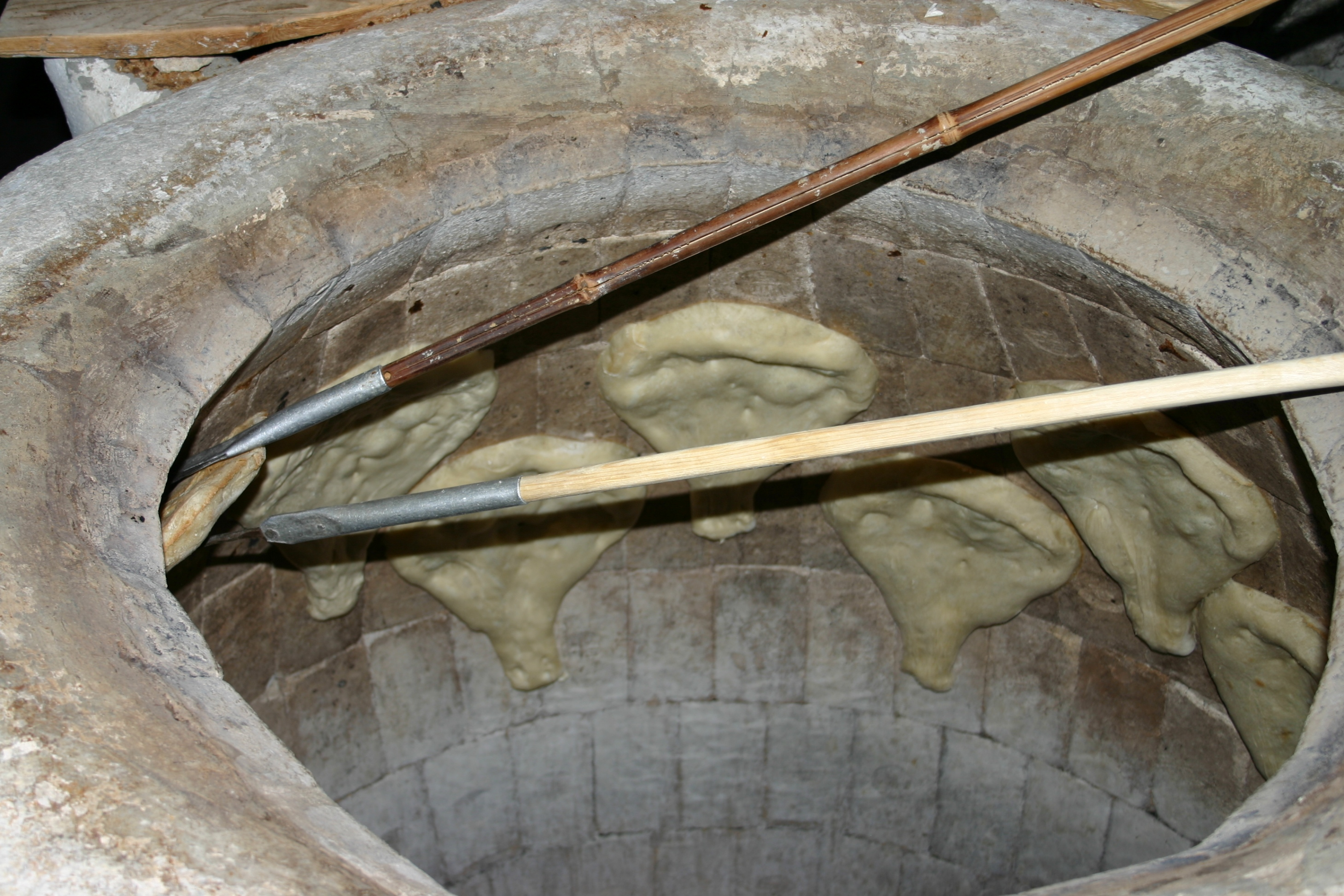

== See also ==
- Naan
- Samoon
- Shotis puri
