= Dassant =

Brand of baking mixes

Dassant Gourmet Mixes is a brand of baking mixes. The brand is produced by NorthWest Specialty Baking Mixes and is based in Portland, Oregon.

== History ==
Dassant was founded in 1980, with its specialization product the Classic Beer Bread. The first order for Dassant products was for 11,000 units, and was produced over a long weekend in a Portland-area coffee manufacturer's facility. The brand expanded in 1987 with the launch of the Truffle Brownie mix. In 1992, the San Francisco Chronicle named Dassant Truffle Brownie Mix the best overall mix, beating out Pillsbury, Duncan Hines and Betty Crocker.

The brand expansion continued through 1990 with the launch of cake mixes, cookie mixes, pancake mixes and one vanilla scone mix. In 1992 the Atlanta Journal named Dassant's Old English Scone "Atlanta's Best Scone".

From 1993 to 1996, Dassant produced a line of bread machine mixes. Flavors included Greek Sun-Dried Tomato, Italian Roasted Garlic, French Provincial and British Cinnamon Orange Bread.

By 1999 Dassant products were available at Trader Joe's stores, including the Italian Orange Dessert Cake.

In early 2012, Dassant introduced a line of baking mixes including pancakes, cookies, carrot cake and pumpkin bread."Dassant Introduces a New Face in Premium Baking Mixes" (Press release). Yahoo! News. February 1, 2012.

In April 2013 Dassant launched Dassant Classics, a brand new selection of three baking mix flavors including brownie, carrot cake and a blondie bar.

== Beer Bread ==
Dassant Classic Beer Bread was introduced in 1980 as a baked loaf. It was first distributed to the Portland area bakeries and restaurants. In 1985 it made its first appearance as a simple-to-make mix requiring no measuring, kneading or rising time to bake.

By 1992, the company had six beer bread varieties, including Parisian Dill Onion and Southern Corn.

The Beer Bread mix was the first product released by Dassant. As of 2026, it remains the company's highest-selling item by volume.

== Truffle Brownie ==
Dassant Truffle Brownie mix was first introduced in 1987. Since then it has been reviewed by numerous publications. In January 2012, Woman's World Magazine called the mixes the "holy grail of brownie mixes".

== Manufacturing ==
Dassant baking mixes are kosher certified. The manufacturing facility is routinely inspected by a 3rd party auditor and adheres to FDA regulations and Good Manufacturing Practices.

It appears that Dassant may now be out of business? Website and phone numbers are out of service, at least as of June 12, 2017.
