= List of quick breads =

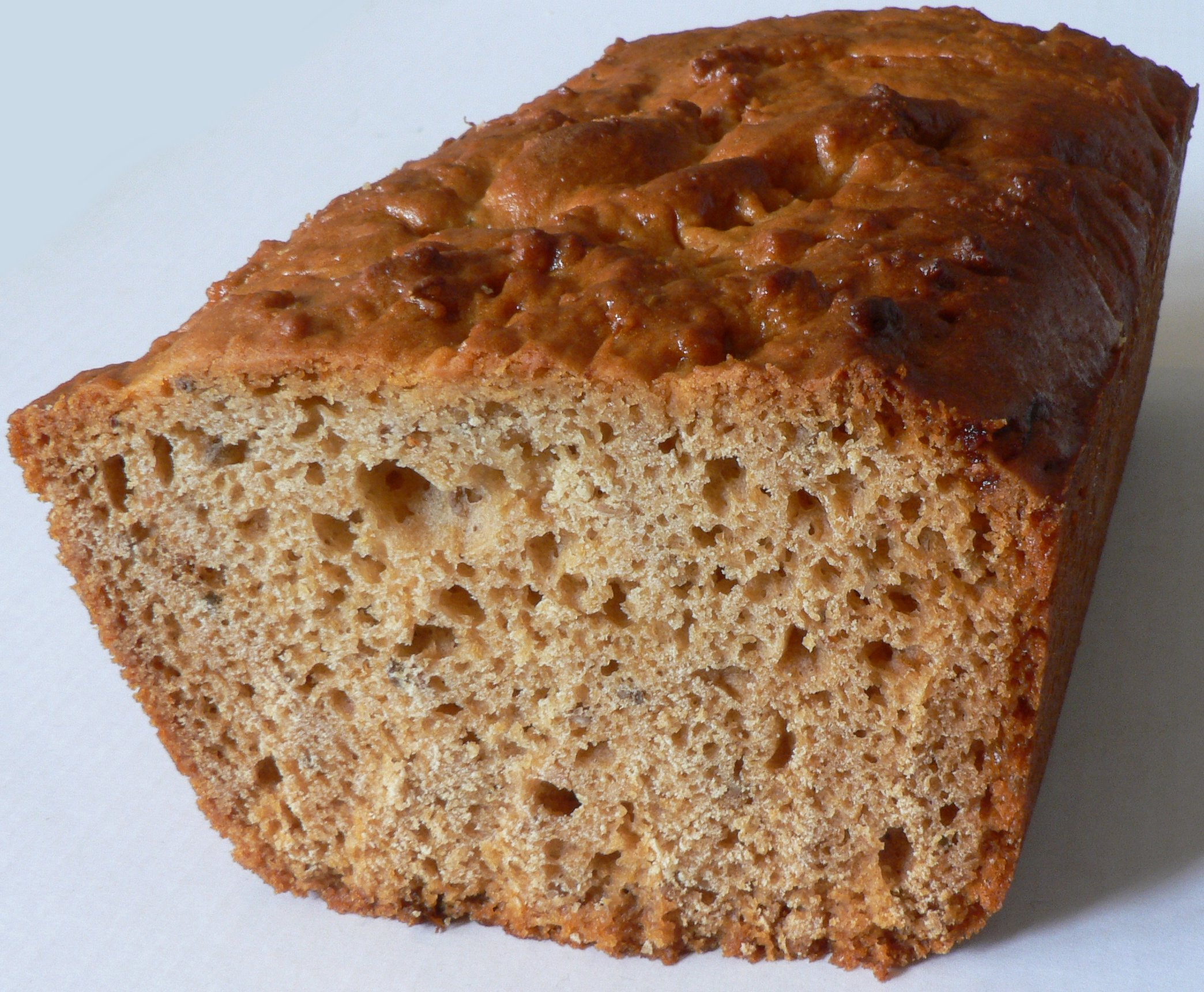
Pain d'épices

This is a list of quick breads. Quick bread is a North American term for any bread leavened with some leavening agents other than yeast or eggs. Preparing a quick bread generally involves two mixing bowls. One contains all dry ingredients (including chemical leavening agents or agent) and one contains all wet ingredients (possibly including liquid ingredients that are slightly acidic in order to initiate the leavening process). In some variations, the dry ingredients are in a bowl and the wet ingredients are heated sauces in a saucepan off-heat and cooled.

== Quick breads ==
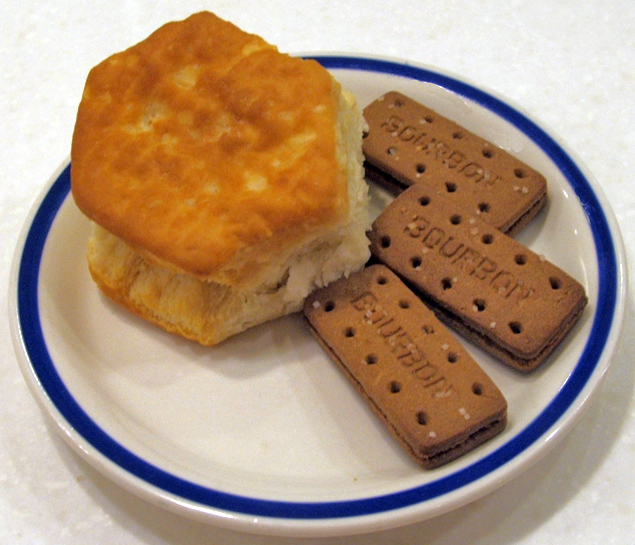
American (left) and British (right) biscuits. The American version is a type of quick bread.

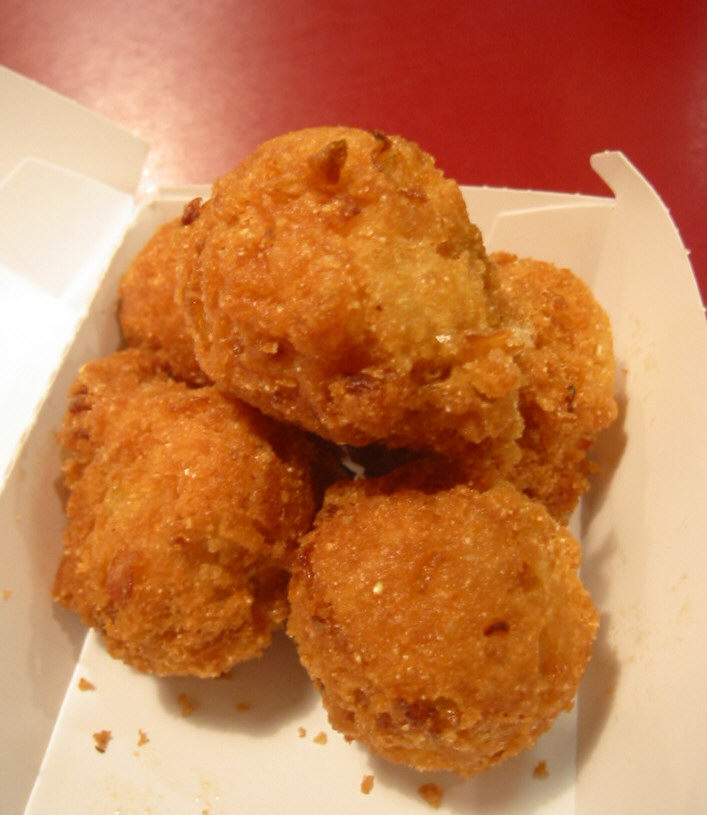
Hushpuppies

- Balep korkun – consumed mainly in central Tibet
- Banana bread – Cake made from mashed bananas
- Bannock – Type of flat quick bread – British and Irish variety of flat quick bread or any large, round article baked or cooked from grain
- Bannock – Type of bread – Indigenous American bread
- Beaten biscuit – Type of biscuit
- Beer bread – Bread baked with beer in the dough
- Biscuit – Type of bread
- Boortsog – a traditional fried dough food found in the cuisines of Central Asia, Idel-Ural, and Mongolia
- Brown bread – Whole grain bread
- Bun – Bread-based food
- Bush bread – Seedcakes baked by Aboriginal Australians
- Carrot bread – Bread featuring carrots
- Cornbread – American bread made with cornmeal
- Damper – Australian Campfire Bread
- Egg waffle – spherical egg waffle popular in Hong Kong and Macao
- Farl – Scottish and Irish three-cornered flatbreads and cakes – any of various quadrant-shaped flatbreads and cakes, traditionally made by cutting a round into four pieces
- Frybread – Variety of flatbread
- Griddle scone – Scone made with a griddle or frying pan
- Hushpuppy – Deep-fried savory food made from cornmeal batter
- Lángos – Hungarian deep-fried flatbread made of a dough with flour, yeast, salt and water
- Mantecadas – Spongy pastry originating in Spain – spongy pastry from Spain similar to a muffin, but flatter
- Muffin – A part-raised flatbread or a quickbread
- Pain d'épices – French quick bread – French cake or quick bread
- Pancake – Thin round cake made of eggs, milk, and flour
- Proja – Type of cornbread – Balkan quick bread
- Puftaloon – Australian fried scone – Australian puffed scone
- Pumpkin bread – Type of moist quick bread made with pumpkin
- Scone – Traditional British and Irish baked good
- Shortcake – Dessert with a crumbly scone-like texture
- Soda bread – variety of quick bread traditionally made in a variety of cuisines in which sodium bicarbonate (otherwise known as baking soda) is used as a leavening agent instead of the more common yeast
- Sopaipilla – Fried pastry traditional in Spain, Latin America, and the southwestern United States
- Touton – Newfoundland pancake
- Waffle – Batter or dough-based food cooked between two patterned, shaped plates
- Zucchini bread
- Zucchini slice, a quickbread-like dish popular in Australia

== See also ==
- List of baked goods
- List of bread rolls
- List of breads
- List of cakes
- List of pancakes
- List of pastries
- List of sweet breads
- List of toast dishes
