= Baking mix =

Dry foodstuff used in baking

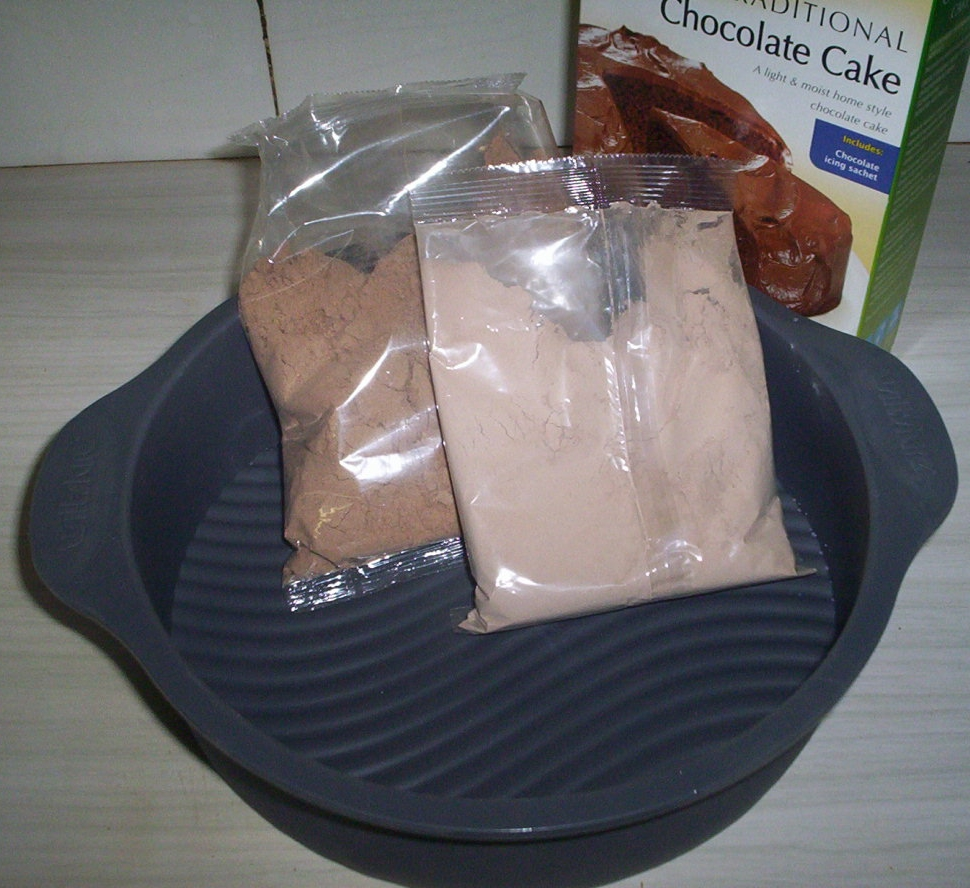
The contents of a chocolate cake baking mix

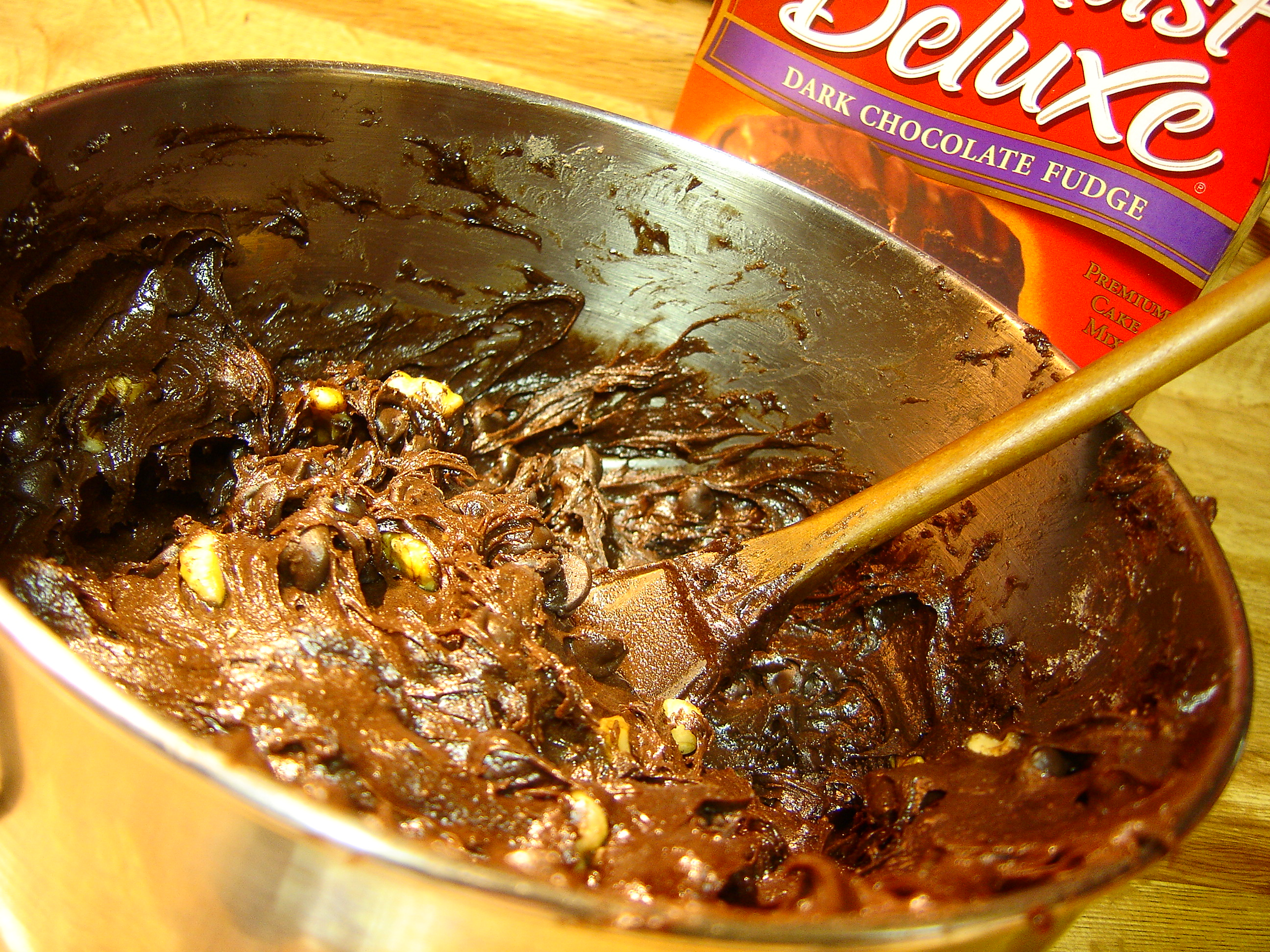
Duncan Hines baking cake mix being mixed together

A baking mix is a mixed formulation of ingredients used for the cooking of baked goods. Baking mixes may be commercially manufactured or homemade. Baking mixes that cater to particular dietary needs, such as vegan, gluten-free, or kosher baking mixes, can be bought in many places.

The global market for baking mixes, both for home and professional use, has been estimated at over US$1 billion in 2023.

== Types ==
Baking mixes are produced for the preparation of specific foods such as breads, quick breads, pancakes, waffles, cakes, muffins, cookies, brownies pizza dough, biscuits and various desserts, among other foods. Some all-purpose baking mixes, including commercial and homemade varieties, can be used to prepare several types of baked goods, such as biscuits, pizza dough, muffins, cookies and pancakes, among others. Some bread baking mixes are formulated for use in a bread machine.

Ingredients in baking mixes may include flour, bread flour, baking powder, baking soda, yeast, sugar and salt, as well as others depending upon the food type. Gluten-free baking mixes may be prepared using rice flour in place of wheat flour. Dry baking mixes typically require the addition of water or milk, and may also require additional ingredients such as eggs, butter and cooking oil.

Bread formulations may also use enzymes as dough improvers to modify dough properties and improve the texture or shelf life of the finished product.

Commercially, the market is divided into dough mixes, complete mixes, and concentrates. A complete mix may be a powdered mixture that needs only water (or water and yeast) added. A concentrate contains flavorful ingredients such as spices and cocoa, but needs additional flour or other bulky ingredients added. Dough mixes are the most common.

== Size ==
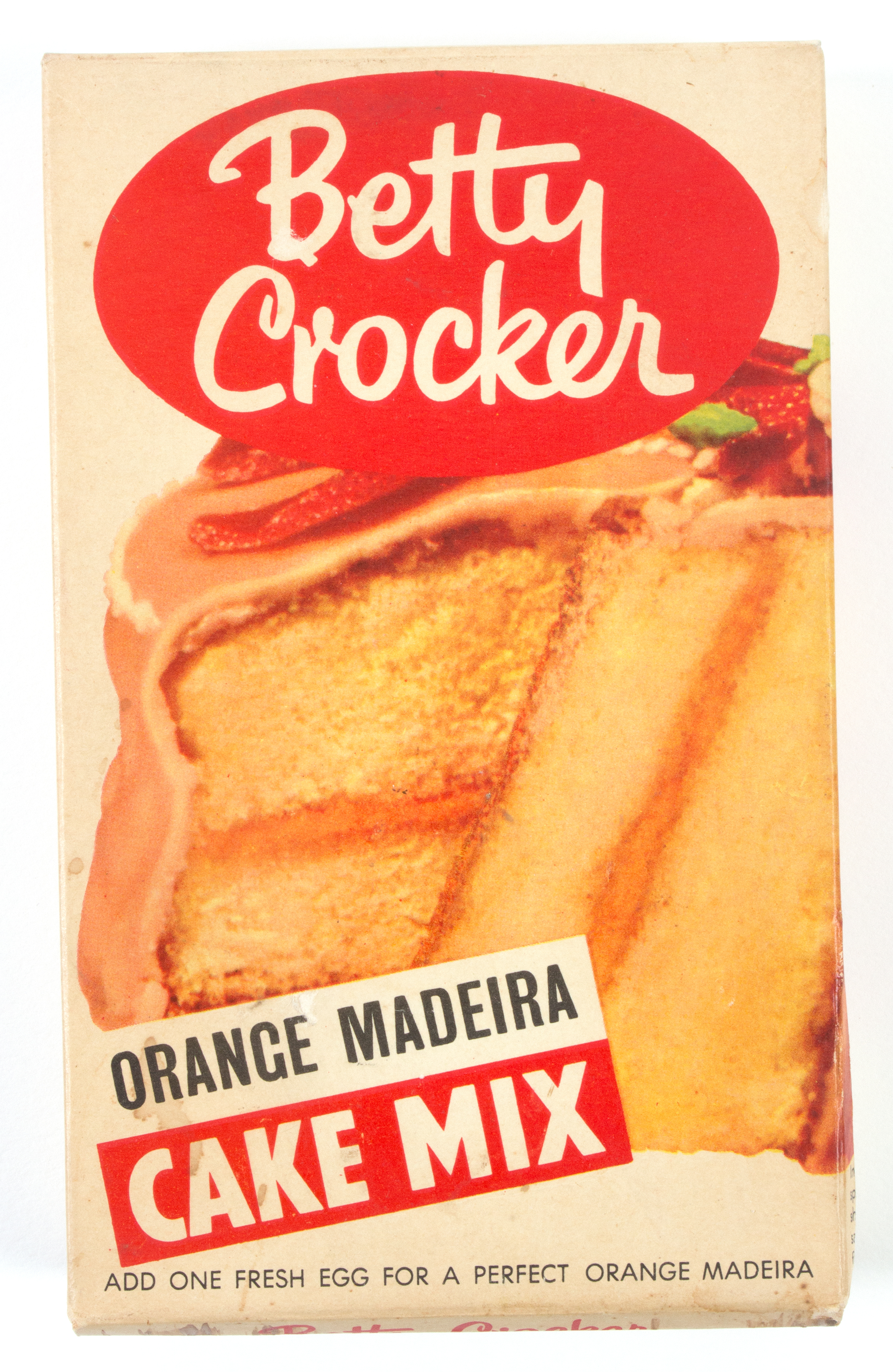
Betty Crocker orange madeira cake mix, New Zealand, 1940s-70s.

Some baking mixes are sold in bulk volumes, and the baker measures out the amount needed. In other cases, the mix is sold pre-measured in a commonly desired size, such as enough baking mix to make a particular size of cake. Around 2012, most large American manufacturers of cake mixes reduced the size of their standard cake mixes by about 15% by weight, as a result of rising prices for ingredients. This resulted in complaints from some customers about the mix making smaller cakes or fewer cupcakes. Betty Crocker and Pillsbury mixes shrank from 18.25 to 15.25 ounces (520 to 430 g). After the COVID-19 pandemic, another round of shrinkflation resulted in some mixes being reduced to as low as 13 ounces (another 15%). However, not all manufacturers followed this trend of reducing the amount to maintain the price; the King Arthur Baking Company, which makes premium-quality cake mixes, continued to produce 22-ounce (620 g) cake mixes.

The accumulated changes, which reduced the weight by about a quarter and added additional leavening agents, meant that some recipes based on combining standard-sized cake mixes with other ingredients, such as those in the Cake Mix Doctor cookbook by Anne Byrn, no longer worked. Some home bakers have attempted to compensate for this by adding flour, sugar, and other ingredients to the store-bought mix.

== History ==
Aunt Jemima pancake mix, manufactured by the Pearl Milling Company in 1896, claims to be the first baking mix in the United States.

== Brands and companies ==
=== Asia ===
The sale of baking mixes in Asia is due in part to urbanization and the adoption of Western baked goods as a hobby or social activity.

=== United States ===
About a quarter of all baking mixes are sold in North America. Major manufacturers include Archer Daniels Midland, Dawn Foods, and General Mills.

==== Brands ====
Arrowhead Mills is a brand of organic baking mixes, cereals, grains and nut butters. The company was founded in 1960 by nutritionist Frank Ford in Hereford, the seat of Deaf Smith County in the southern Texas Panhandle west of Amarillo, Texas. Many Arrowhead Mills products are certified at least 70 percent organic by the Texas Department of Agriculture (TDA) or Pro-Cert Organic Systems.

Atkins Nutritionals produces an all-purpose baking mix, along with several other foods. Dr. Atkins founded Atkins Nutritionals, Inc. in 1989 to promote the low-carbohydrate products of his increasingly popular Atkins diet. This diet was developed after Atkins read a research paper in the Journal of the American Medical Association published by Gordon Azar and Walter Lyons Bloom. Atkins used information from the study to resolve his own overweight condition.

General Mills owns the brand Betty Crocker, under which a variety of foods are purveyed, including baking mixes. Marjorie Husted was the creator of Betty Crocker. She was a home economist and businesswoman under whose supervision the image of Betty Crocker became an icon for General Mills. In 1921, Washburn Crosby merged with five or more other milling companies to form General Mills. There are a number of Betty Crocker-branded products, such as plastic food containers and measuring cups, and a line of small appliances like popcorn poppers and sandwich makers with the Betty Crocker brand name. It also owns the Pillsbury Company, which makes its own baking mixes.

Bisquick is a baking mix brand that was founded by Carl Smith in 1931. At the time, Smith was employed a sales executive for the General Mills, Inc. Sperry Division. Bisquick may be used to bake several foods, such as biscuits, pancakes, coffee cake and other baked goods. According to General Mills, Bisquick was invented in 1930 after one of their top sales executives met an innovative train dining car chef on a business trip. After the sales executive complimented the chef on his deliciously fresh biscuits, the dining car chef shared that he used a pre-mixed biscuit batter he created consisting of lard, flour, baking powder and salt. The chef then stored his pre-mixed biscuit batter on ice in his kitchen ahead of time, enabling him to bake fresh biscuits quickly on the train every day. As soon as the sales executive returned from that business trip, he stole the chef's idea and created Bisquick.

Bob's Red Mill is an American company that produces over 400 products, including baking mixes. The company is a producer of lines of natural, certified organic, and gluten-free milled grain products, billing itself as the "nation's leading miller of diverse whole-grain foods." In February 2010, owner Bob Moore transferred ownership of the company to his employees using an employee stock ownership plan.

Dassant is an American brand of baking mixes. The company was founded in 1980, with its specialization product the Classic Beer Bread. Dassant Truffle Brownie mix was first introduced in 1987. Since then it has been reviewed by numerous publications. In January 2012, Woman's World Magazine called the mixes the "holy grail of brownie mixes". In early 2012, the company introduced a line of baking mixes including pancakes, cookies, carrot cake and pumpkin bread.

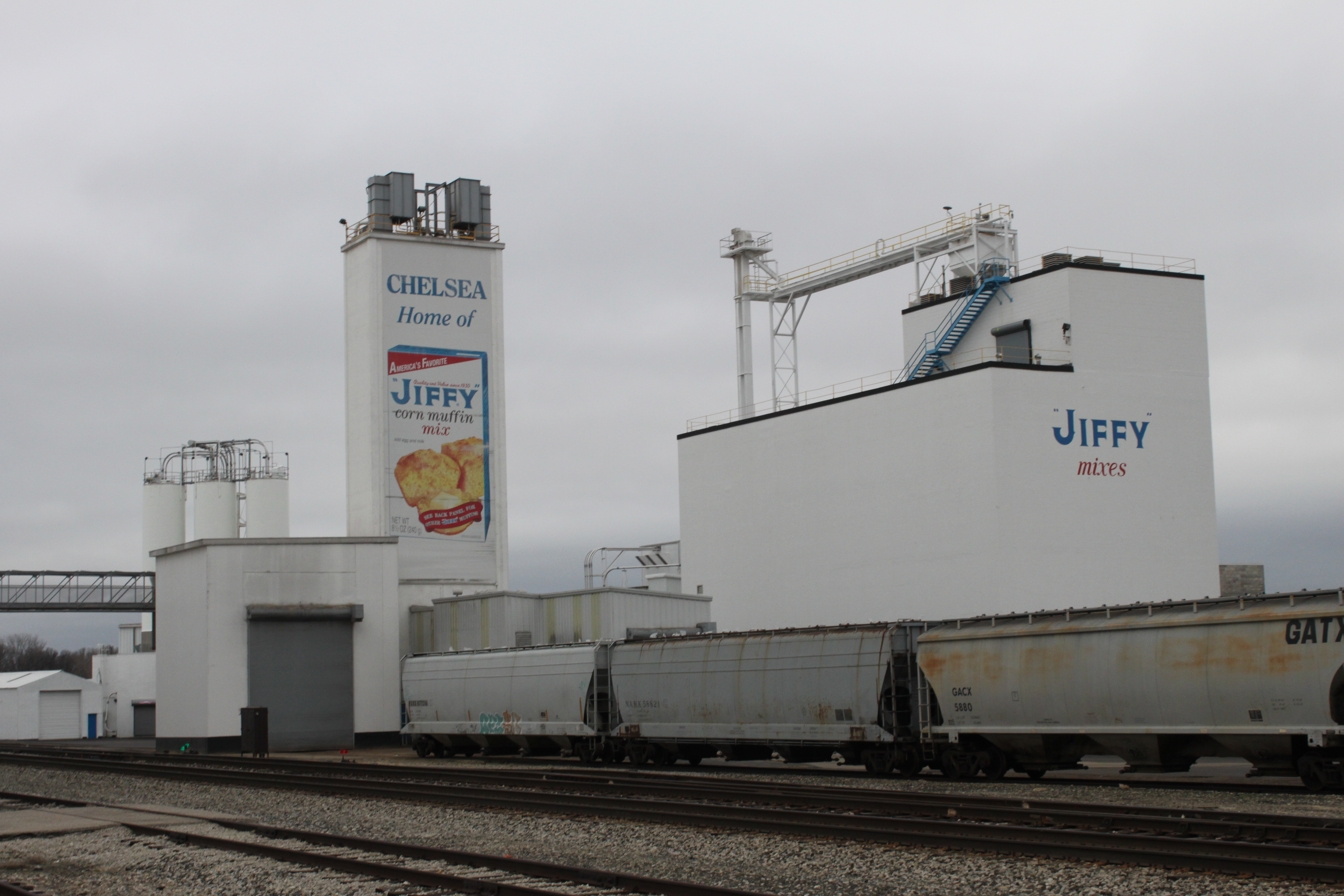
Grain elevators at the Chelsea Milling Company, manufacturer of Jiffy mix products, in Chelsea, Michigan

Jiffy mix is a baking mix brand produced and owned by the Chelsea Milling Company in Chelsea, Michigan. Jiffy mix has been produced since 1930. As of 2015, 19 mixes are produced, which are distributed to all of the U.S. states, and in 32 countries. Most of the company's products are handled, processed and produced in-house, which includes grain storage, the grinding of grains into flour, product mixing and box manufacturing.

Martha White is an American brand under which several baking mixes are purveyed. The Martha White brand was established as the premium brand of Nashville, Tennessee-based Royal Flour Mills in 1899. At that time, Nashville businessman Richard Lindsey introduced a fine flour that he named for his daughter, Martha White Lindsey. The Martha White brand is probably most associated with its long-term sponsorship of the Grand Ole Opry, a radio program featuring country music.

==== Companies ====
Auntie Anne's is an American chain of pretzel bakeries that also produces a pretzel baking mix. The chain started as a market stand in the Downingtown, Pennsylvania, Farmer's Market.

Cherrybrook Kitchen is a company that produces baking mixes and other baking products. The company was founded in response to the growing number of children and adults diagnosed with food allergies. 11 million adults and children are affected by peanut, dairy, egg and nut allergens, while approximately one in 133 Americans suffers from celiac disease.

The King Arthur Baking Company is an American supplier of flour, baking mixes, baked goods and cookbooks. The company was founded in 1790 in Boston, Massachusetts by Henry Wood. In 1996 the company's name was changed to The King Arthur Flour Co. to reflect its principal brand, and also converted to an employee-owned business structure. The employee-owned company has been named one of the Best Places to Work in Vermont every year since the inception of the award in 2006.

Conagra Brands is an American packaged foods company that owns the Duncan Hines brand, which includes cake mixes. Duncan Hines (March 26, 1880 – March 15, 1959) was an American pioneer of restaurant ratings for travelers. He is best known today for the brand of food products that bears his name. In 1952, Hines introduced Duncan Hines bread through the Durkee's Bakery Company of Homer, New York. Principals Michael C. Antil Sr., Albert Durkee, and Lena Durkee were the bakery proprietors. This was Duncan Hines' first foray into baked goods. In 1957, Nebraska Consolidated Mills, who at the time owned the cake mix license, sold the cake mix business to the U.S. consumer products company Procter & Gamble. The company expanded the business to the national market and added a series of related products.

Streit's is a kosher food company based in New York City that produces 11 cake mixes. The company also produces pancake mixes and many other foods. The company was founded in 1916 by Aron Streit, a Jewish immigrant from Austria. Its first factory was on Pitt Street on the Lower East Side of Manhattan. The company's 47,000-square-foot (4,400 m^{2}) matzo factory, along with Katz's Delicatessen and Yonah Schimmel's Knish Bakery, is a surviving piece of the Lower East Side's Jewish heritage.

=== Europe ===
Baking mixes sold in Europe account for about 30% of the global market. Major manufacturers such as the Irish Kerry Group and the Belgian Puratos Group were founded there.

==== Germany ====
Dr. Oetker is a German company that also produces cake mixes which are sold in various other countries.

Baking mixes

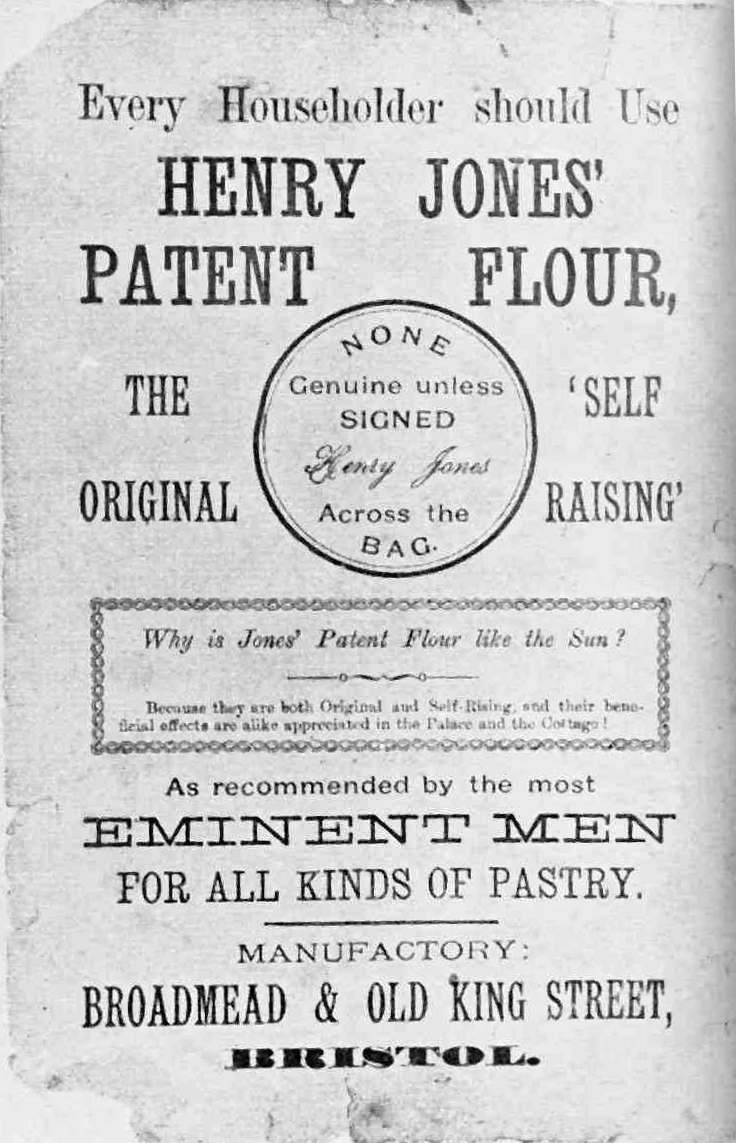
An advertisement for Henry Jones Self-Raising Flour, Bristol, UK (between circa 1845 and circa 1880)

== See also ==
- Cookie dough – some store varieties are pre-mixed
- List of food companies
- List of twice-baked foods
