= Zucchini bread =

A quick bread made from zucchini

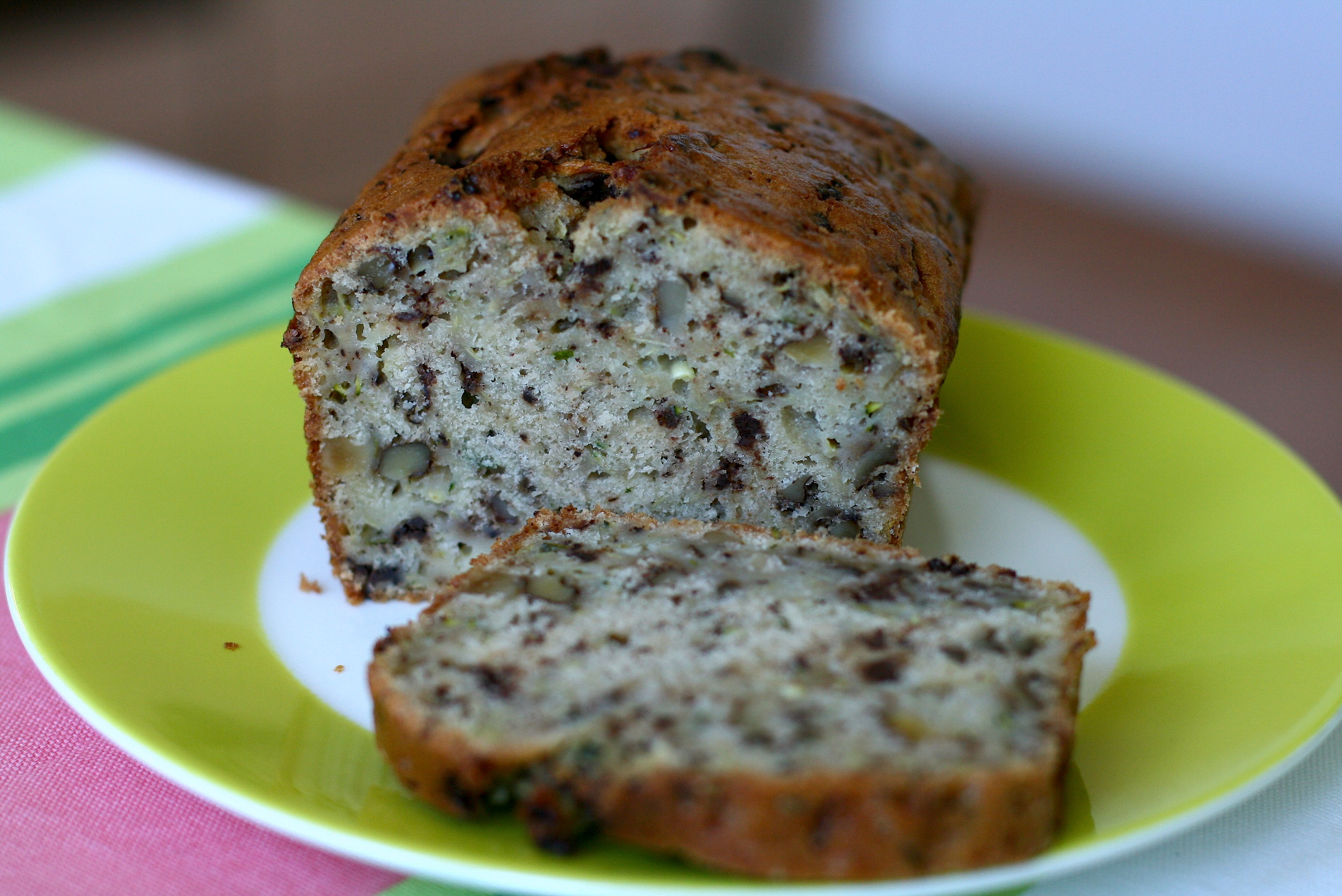
- Sliced zucchini bread
- Type: Quick bread
- Main ingredients: Zucchini, sugar, flour, eggs, salt
- Variations: Cheese, vegan, lemon, chocolate.

Zucchini bread is a moist quick bread made from zucchini. The zucchini is typically unpeeled and shredded with a food processor or a grater. Removing seeds before shredding can impact the taste, texture, and moisture depending on the maturity of the seeds.

Zucchini bread is typically made with zucchini, flour, salt, sugar, eggs and other additional ingredients. Additional ingredients can include multiple things such as dried fruit, nuts, chocolate chips, spices, and cheese. Zucchini bread may be served with a variety of accompaniments such as milk, ice cream, butter, cream cheese, honey, or jams.

Zucchini bread batter is typically baked in a rectangular or square shaped loaf pan, but can also be made into muffins by using a muffin tin.

Chocolate zucchini bread.

Variations include a cheese-flavoured zucchini bread, with a savory flavor. Most often, sharp cheddar, swiss, mozzarella, or parmesan are used. Other variations include chocolate zucchini bread using cocoa powder, and lemon zucchini bread flavored with lemon zest or juice. In vegan versions, ingredients like eggs or dairy products are substituted with vegan alternatives like vegetable oil or plant-based milk.

== See also ==
- Banana bread
- Carrot bread
- List of squash and pumpkin dishes
- List of quick breads
- Pumpkin bread
- Zucchini slice
