= Pandemic baking =

Home baking during the COVID-19 pandemic

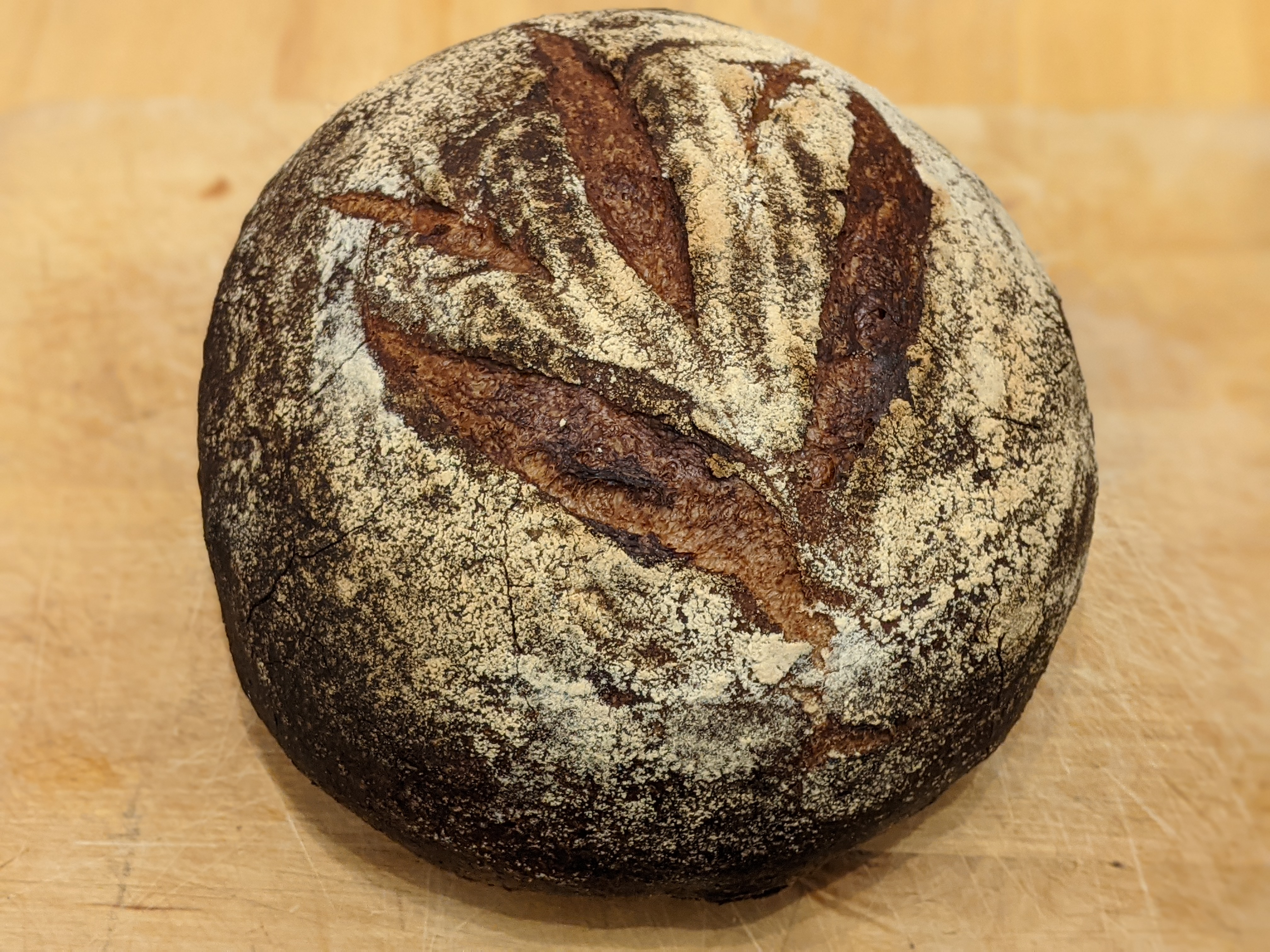
Sourdough baked during lockdown

During the 2020 COVID-19 lockdowns, home baking experienced an explosion of interest, which was termed pandemic baking, lockdown baking, or quarantine baking. The increase in home baking sparked by the pandemic outlasted the lockdowns, resulting in an overall increase in interest in home baking.

The most popular bakes were breads; due to yeast shortages, sourdough breads were particularly popular in some areas and unleavened breads or breads leavened with baking soda, baking powder, or beer were also popular.

Post-pandemic, the popularity of home baking remained high, but became a weekend activity. Home cooking in general remained more common than it was pre-pandemic.

== Background ==
Baking-aisle sales had been flat since 2016. The COVID-19 pandemic forced many workers into working remotely or being unable to work at all; in both cases, people who had previously spent many hours a day away from home were home full time. Two-thirds of Americans reported an extra six hours a week of free time.

Many newly-homebound workers developed hobbies during the pandemic that they hadn't previously had time to pursue. Almost half spent more time on home cooking, and baking in particular was one of the most popular. Bread and Viennoiserie in particular are types of baking that require the baker to be available at multiple points -- the timing of which are not always easy to predict -- during a baking process that might be hours to days long.

Baking has also been associated with stress relief.

== Causes ==
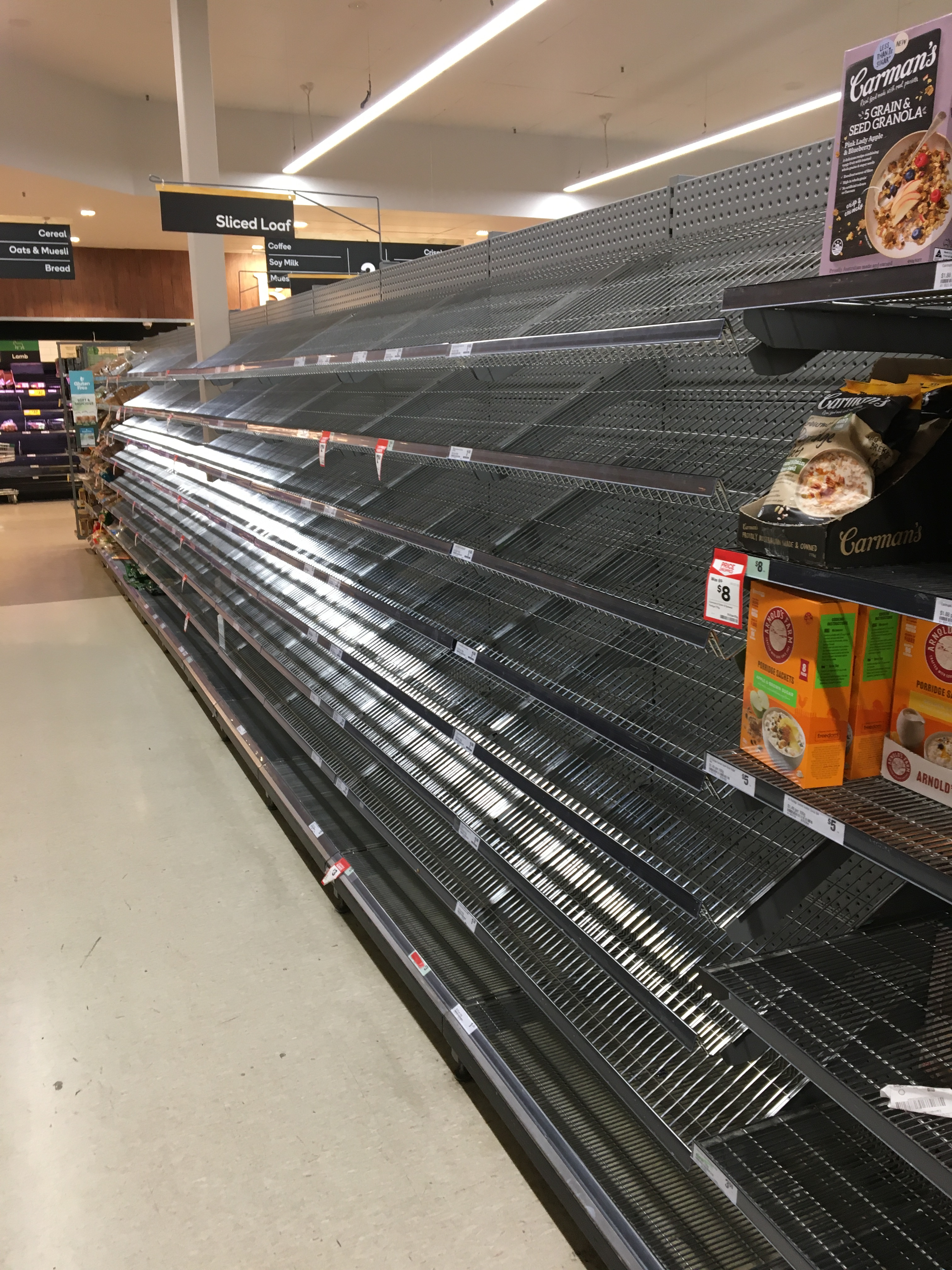
Empty supermarket bread aisle in Wagga Wagga, New South Wales

The interest in bread making was associated with newly-homebound workers developing hobbies they hadn't previously had the time at home to pursue, such as bread baking. It also was associated with retail bakery closings due to the pandemic, which meant those bakeries' customers couldn't access the baked goods they previously had regularly consumed. Some areas also experienced panic buying of bread. In much of the world breadbaking became symbolic of resilience in the response to the lockdowns.

According to Emily St. James, "bread baking is a thing we do in a crisis". Before the pandemic, US company King Arthur Baking was in the process of rebranding; the company's rebranding studies had found that many of their customers engaged in stress baking: baking at home to bring joy to themselves and others during stressful times.

Similar to the COVID-19 pandemic, the Spanish flu pandemic of 1918-1919 also was a time with food shortages, and home bread baking surged. Developing expertise in cooking and baking addressed fears that if there were a shortage, people would be able to provide for themselves.

Baking together over video calls or in virtual classes became a popular way for people to connect, whether with family and friends or to build new relationships during times of social isolation. Many also found a sense of community by viewing others' finished bakes on social media..

Some bakers recreated nostalgic favorites from the past; in India school cake experienced a resurgence in popularity. Juliana Young, writing in Digest: A Journal of Foodways and Culture, agreed that nostalgia, and a desire for tradition during a time when many traditions were unavailable, contributed to the impulse to bake. The BBC argued that cooking and baking, even for oneself, invoked feelings of shared experience and social interaction because food is often shared. Baking, and kneading in particular, has long been noted as a calming and meditative activity.

== Popularity ==
In Britain over half of those surveyed agreed (39%) or strongly agreed (15%) that they'd "started baking again due to more free time during lockdown". In the US, 31% of consumers reported having baked at least once a week and another 24% reported having baked once or twice a month in 2022. Mark Bittman referred to the increase in interest as "the recent baking craze".

== Popular items ==
Cakes and cookies were popular bakes, but breads were the items most focused on.

Banana bread was a popular bake in the UK, India, and the US. Sourdough bread was popular in the US; in the UK it was popular among Millennials.

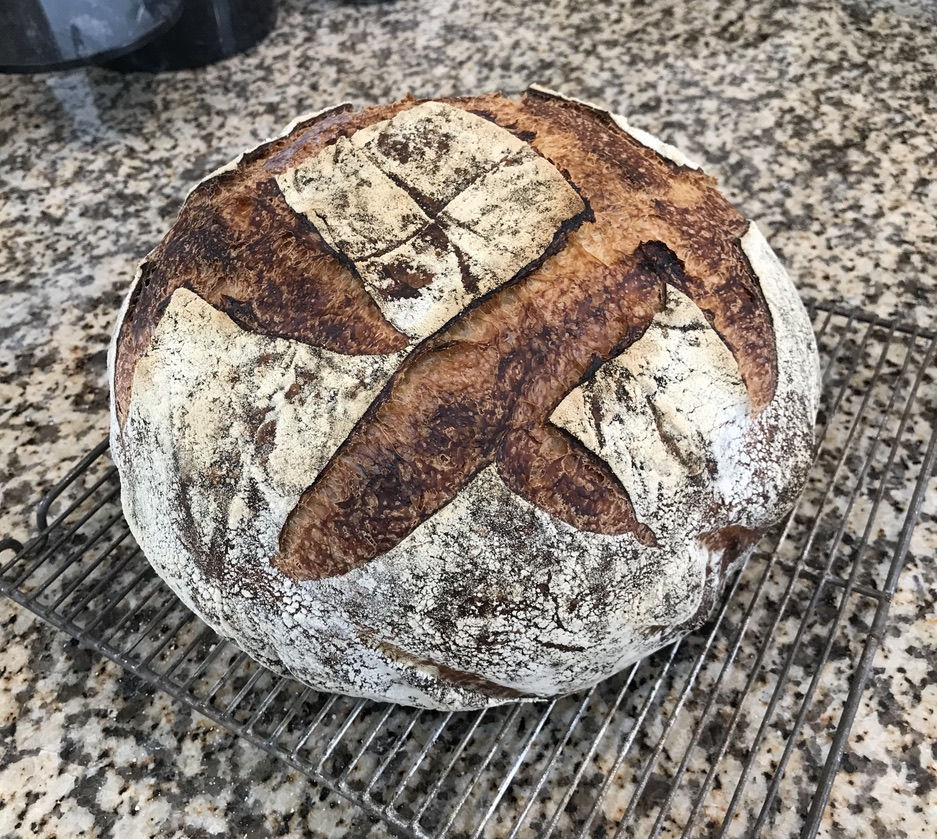
Sourdough baked in Ohio during lockdown

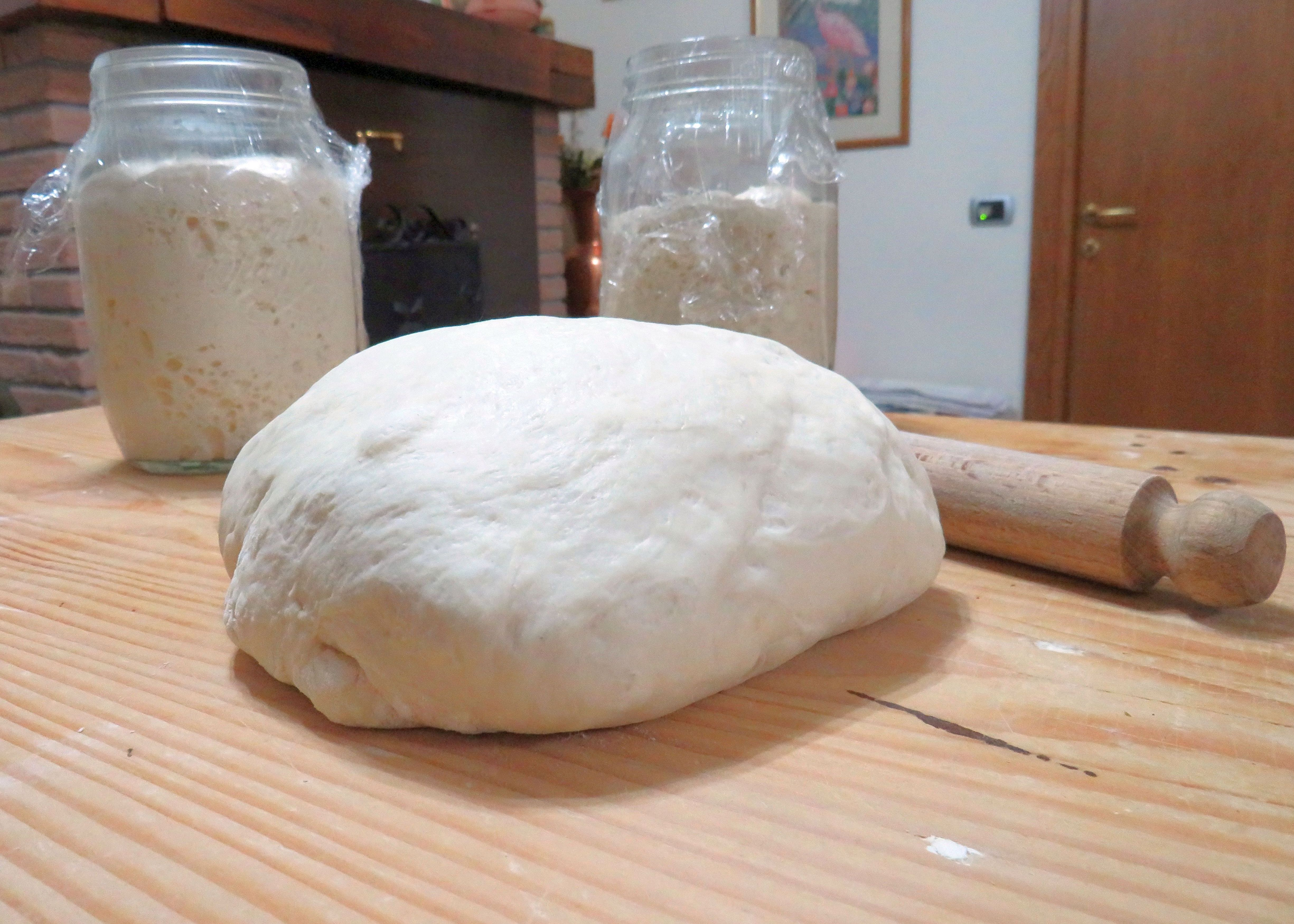
Sourdough and starter in Italy during lockdown

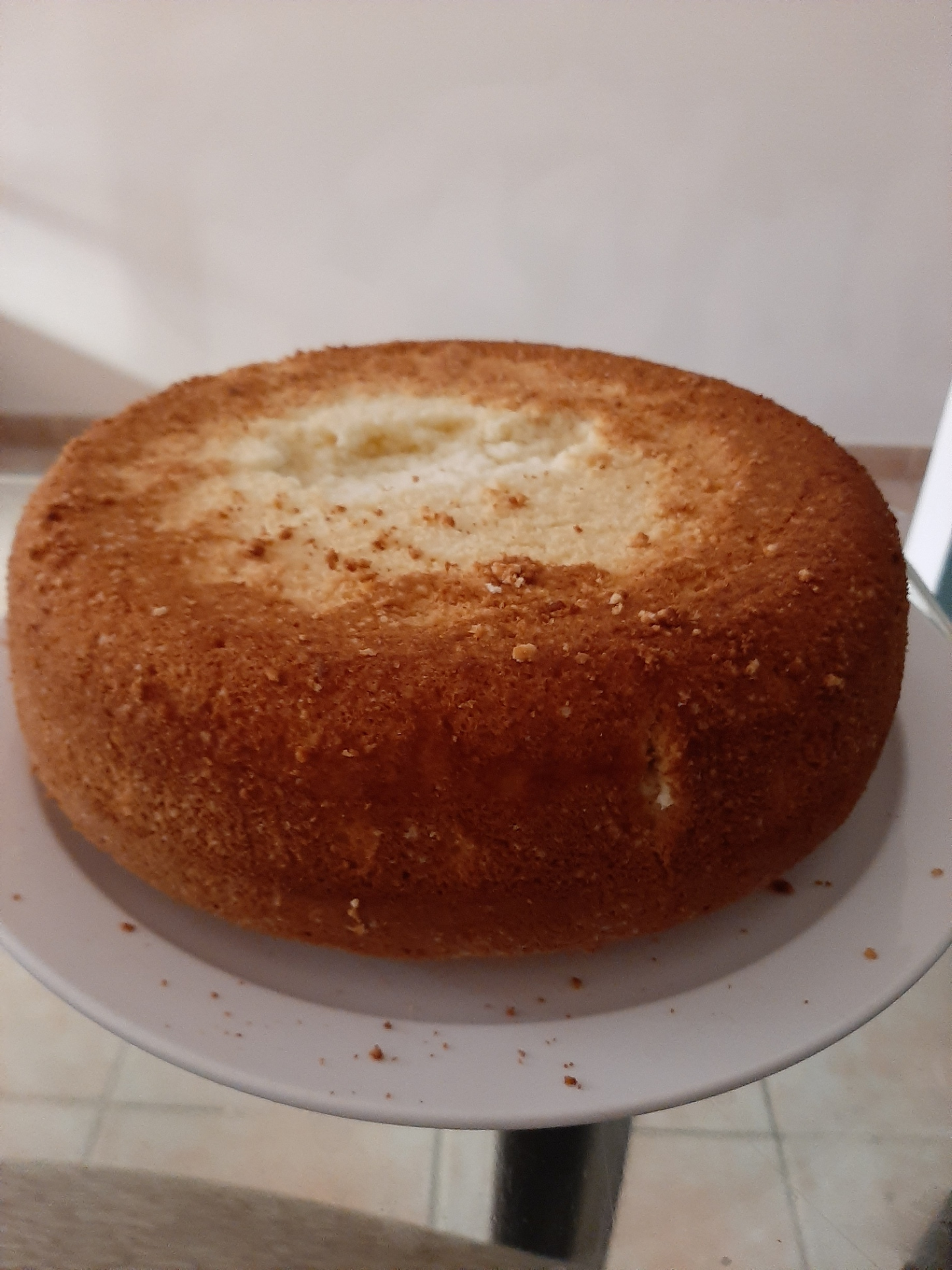
Panetela, a Cuban sponge cake baked during lockdown

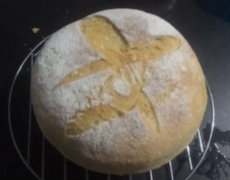
Sourdough baked during lockdown

== Short term consequences ==
Books on breadmaking experienced spikes in sales. Calls to King Arthur's Baker's Hotline advice line spiked, requiring the company to increase the size of that team. In France, Moulinex reported a 40% increase in sales of breadmakers. Pinterest reported an over 1500% increase in the search term "savory croissant" in Argentina.

Sales of flour, yeast, and many other baking supplies in the US doubled or tripled in the first months of the pandemic. Some areas experienced shortages of flour and yeast that began with the first lockdowns and lasted for months. Unlike the COVID-19 shortages caused by hoarding and panic buying, such as toilet paper and hand sanitizer, people were actually buying flour and yeast, using it, and wanting to buy more. In the case of King Arthur Flour, the inability to meet demand wasn't due to a shortage of wheat or milling capacity but to bagging capacity for 5-pound bags of flour.

Because of the yeast shortages, many bread bakers experimented with sourdough. One New York baker reported that after having offered on Instagram to share her sourdough discard, she received hundreds of requests within 24 hours and more than a thousand, some from as far away as Singapore and Australia.

Other bakers experimented with unleavened breads or breads leavened with baking soda, baking powder, or beer, such as damper bread, an Australian bread that is traditionally made without leavening.

== Longer effects ==
Some sources indicate that pandemic baking turned into a long-term higher interest in home baking. According to Food Innovation Quarterly, pandemic baking "revived the practice of baking homemade bread in France and Italy". According to Freedonia Group, "home baking activity remains more popular [in 2023] compared to 2019".

According to Supermarket News, in the US there was "a lingering interest in the activity, which...is helping buoy retail sales of baking ingredients". The trade magazine in 2023 predicted ongoing increases in sales of home baking supplies through at least 2027 due to "more consumers taking up home baking as an activity in the longer term after initially baking more during the pandemic". In October 2023 it reported interest in sourdough baking classes had remained high.

According to Markus Haberfellner of the Upper Austrian Haberfellner Mill, consumer demand for flour had returned to pre-pandemic levels, but "what has remained is that those people have seen how much effort goes into baking bread. So, they appreciate the professional group of bakers and are returning to them".

According to the Utah Farm Bureau, interest in sourdough baking continued to increase after the end of the pandemic. The increased interest in sourdough baking during the pandemic led to innovation in specialized equipment for home bakers. Companies developed dedicated temperature control devices specifically for maintaining sourdough starters, addressing challenges that bakers had previously solved using improvised methods such as heating pads, warm ovens, or placement near appliances.

According to Baking Business, after the sharp increase in sales of home baking supplies in 2020, there was a slight decline in 2021 but another increase in 2022.

Some commercial bakeries, some of whom had previously considered home baking as a threat to their business, rolled out home baking kits to draw sales from people who remained interested in home baking after the pandemic had ended. Baking supply companies also rolled out new kits and recipes to encourage pandemic bakers to maintain the habit after the lockdowns ended.

As remote workers returned to workplaces, baking became a weekend activity. Home cooking in general remained more common than prepandemic levels.
