= Pain d'épices =

French spiced cake

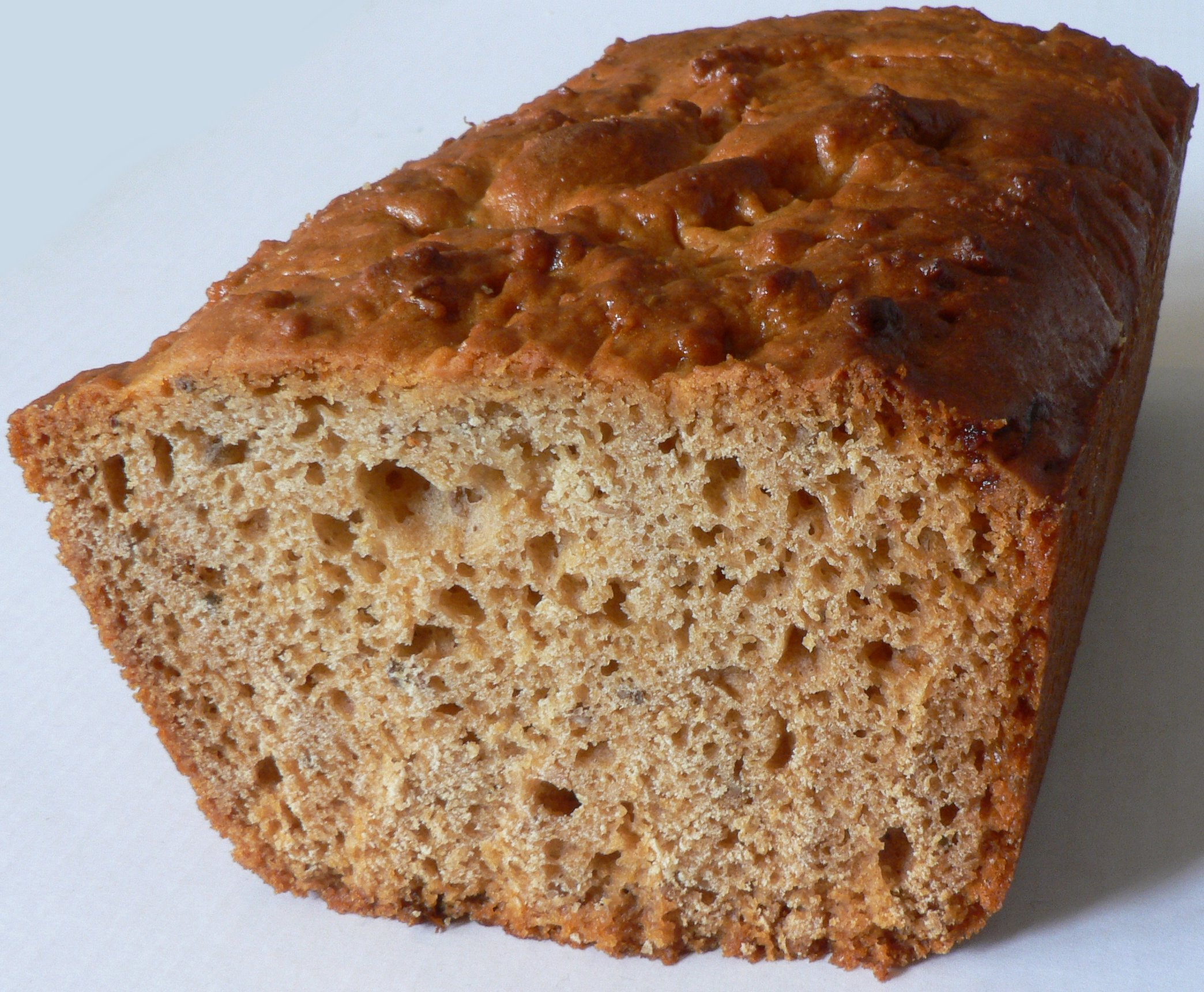
- Type: Cake
- Place of origin: France
- Region or state: Reims, Dijon, and Alsace
- Associated cuisine: French cuisine
- Main ingredients: Rye flour; honey; spices
- Ingredients generally used: Aniseed; clove; nutmeg; cinnamon
- Similar dishes: Spice cake; gingerbread

Pain d'épices (French: [pɛ̃ depis]) or pain d'épice (French for 'spice bread') is a French cake in the Gateau de Voyage (en. Travel Cake) category of French baking (classed as a quick bread in North America). Its ingredients, according to Le Dictionnaire de l'Académie française (1694), were "rye flour, honey and spices". In Alsace, a considerable tradition incorporates a pinch of cinnamon.

== Overview ==
According to Maguelonne Toussaint-Samat, the commercial production of pain d'épices was a specialty of Dijon and Reims, based on a recipe of a pastry cook from Bourges and made popular when Charles VII and his mistress Agnes Sorel expressed their liking for it. The honey used was the dark buckwheat honey of Brittany. In 1571, the Corporation of Spice Bread Makers of Reims were chartered separately from the party cooks; in 1596, the Parisian makers of pain d'épices were given their own charter. The Reims pain d'épices industry was decimated by World War I. The pain d'épices of Dijon outpaced its older competitors in the Napoleonic era, and the bread is now considered one of the specialties of that city.

Pain d'épices was originally a sourdough bread without added leavening; it was left in a wooden trough to rest in a cool place for months, during which the honeyed rye flour experienced fermentation. When ready the dough was cooked in loaf moulds. The modern product usually rises with baking soda, or with baking powder, developed in the nineteenth century.

Because traditional pain d'épices is sweetened entirely with honey, honey merchants in France often stock loaves of it for sale. La Collective des Biscuits et Gâteaux de France reserves the name pain d'épices pur miel (French for 'pure honey spice bread') for pain d'épices sweetened only with honey.

== See also ==
- List of French desserts
- List of breads
- List of quick breads
- Cuisine and specialties of Nord-Pas-de-Calais
