= School cake =

British traybake dessert

School cake or school dinner cake is a British traybake dessert consisting of a vanilla sheet cake with vanilla frosting and sprinkles, often served with pink custard. It was commonly served as part of school dinner in primary schools in the United Kingdom.

According to Vulture, the cake was served to students on Fridays as an inducement to good behavior through the week. According to Wales Online, the dish is "synonymous with school dinners" and was served "for generations". Good Housekeeping called it a "classic". The Manchester Evening News called it "iconic".

The dish was part of the pandemic baking phenomenon.
