= Zucchini slice =

Dish common in Australia and New Zealand

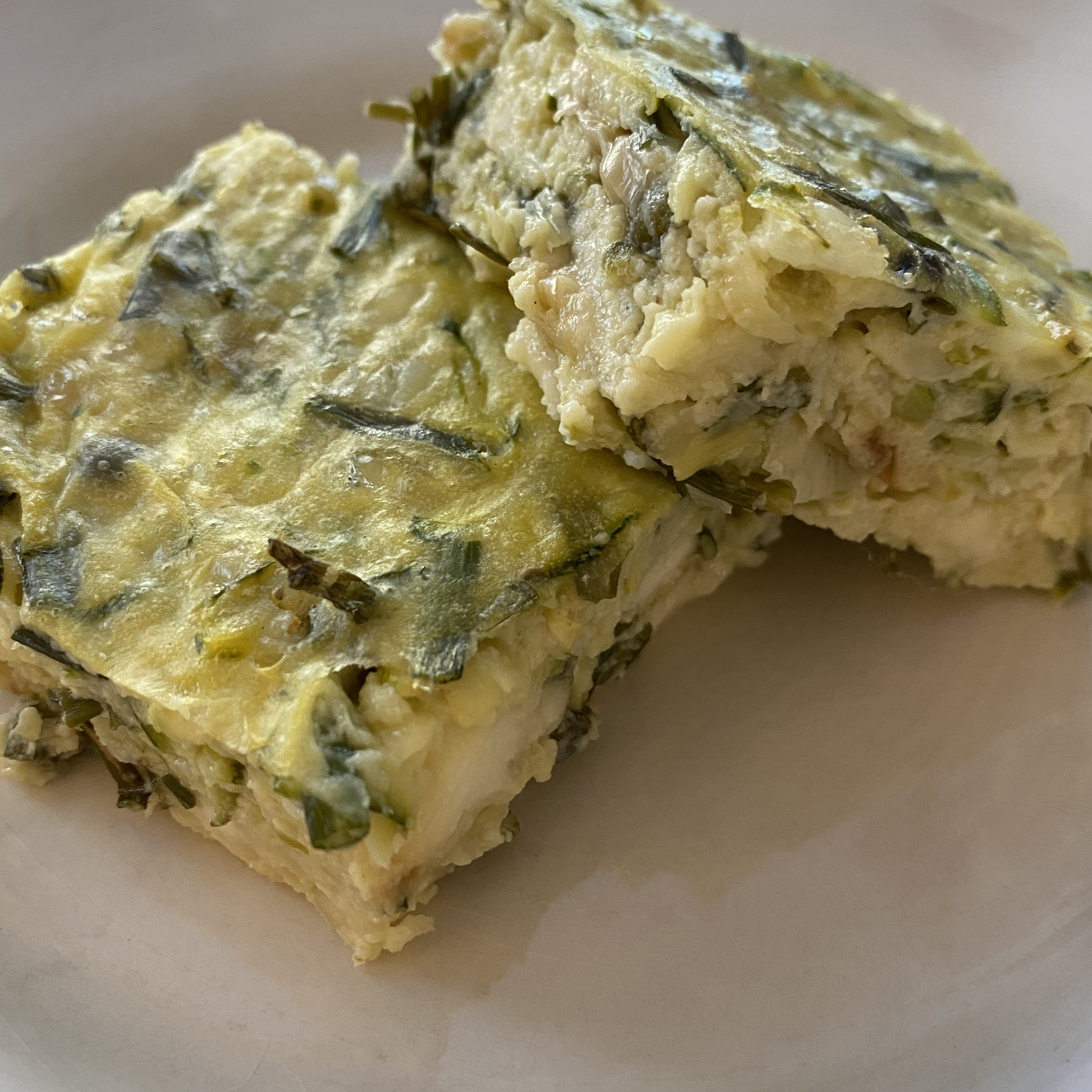
- Course: Main dish, side dish
- Region or state: Australia and New Zealand
- Associated cuisine: Australia, New Zealand
- Serving temperature: Warm, room temperature, hot
- Main ingredients: Zucchini, eggs, cheese, flour
- Ingredients generally used: Bacon, onions
- Similar dishes: frittata, quiche, quickbread

Zucchini slice is a dish common in Australia and New Zealand that bears similarities to frittatas and quick breads. It consists of zucchini, eggs, cheese, usually bacon, and flour, baked to form a flat loaf. It is then cut into squares and served as a main dish or a side dish, often eaten for lunch.

It is one of a category of similarly-named and -served dishes common in the region, both sweet and savory.

== History ==
In Australia and New Zealand the dish is a "beloved lunchbox staple or café snack", according to the New York Times. It is one of a category of slices, both sweet and savory, common in the region.

The dish may have roots in Europe or the Middle East.

== Description ==
The New York Times calls it "a cross between a frittata and savory quick bread". The main flavors are of egg and cheese.

== Ingredients, preparation, and serving ==
The dish combines zucchini, eggs, cheese, flour, and usually bacon, along with seasonings and sometimes other ingredients.

The dish takes approximately an hour to produce. The zucchini is grated and combined with the other ingredients into a thick batter and baked until firm, typically in a Lamington pan. It is served in flat slices, usually warm or at room temperature, and eaten out of hand. It can also be served hot.

The dish is typically eaten as an entree or a side dish.

== Popularity ==
The dish is very common in Australia and New Zealand; Australian Women's Weekly introduces their version with the phrase "No introduction needed" and named it to their 2003 list of six "all time reader favourite meals". According to Taste.com.au, it is their most popular recipe. Magic Little Meals refers to it as "a favorite with young and old". According to More it is perennially at the top of online search lists during zucchini season in Australia.

== Similar dishes ==
Dishes similar to the category of slices include bar cookies, frittatas, and sheet cakes. The zucchini slice is most similar to a frittata, although the inclusion of flour makes it according to Lukas Volger similar in texture to "somewhere between a quiche and a savory muffin".

== See also ==
- Mucver
- Vanilla slice
- Zucchini bread
