= King Arthur Baking =

American flour and baking company

Coordinates: 43°42′10″N 72°18′41″W

King Arthur Baking Company
- Rebranded logo since 2020

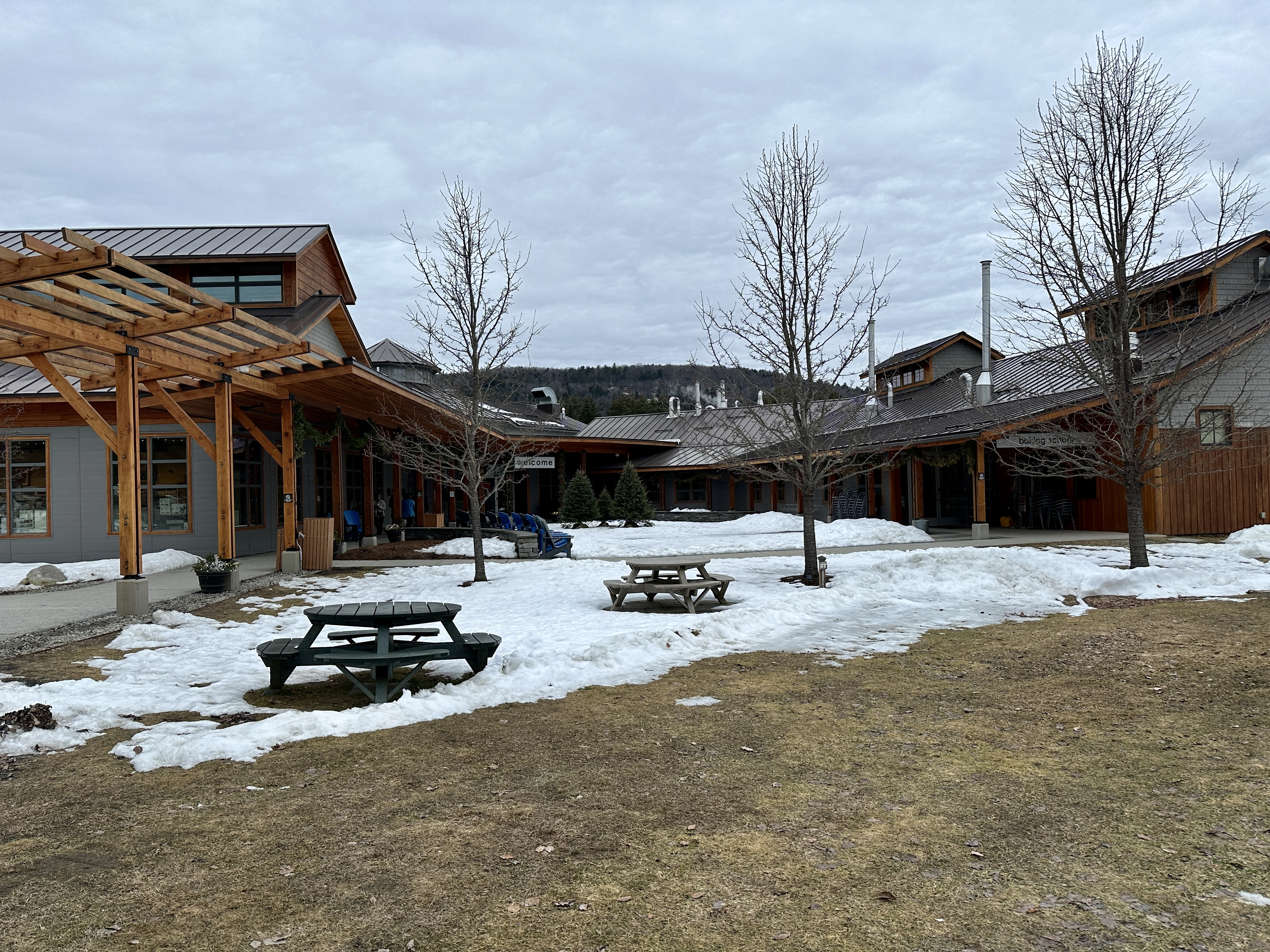
- King Arthur Baking retail store, cafe, bakery, and baking school
- Type: Private, employee-owned benefit corporation
- Industry: Food
- Founded: 1790; 236 years ago
- Founder: Henry Wood
- Headquarters: Norwich, Vermont, United States
- Key people: Karen Colberg, CEO
- Products: Flour, baking mixes, cookbooks, baked goods, baking classes
- Owner: Employee-Owned (since 2004)
- Number of employees: 365 (as of 2020)
- Website: www.kingarthurbaking.com

The King Arthur Baking Company, formerly the King Arthur Flour Company, is an American supplier of flour, ingredients, baking mixes, cookbooks, and baked goods. It also runs two baking schools, one at its Norwich, Vermont, bakery and the other in Burlington, Washington.

The company was founded in Boston, Massachusetts, in 1790 before the headquarters was moved to Norwich, Vermont. It is the oldest flour company in the United States. King Arthur Baking is employee-owned and a B Lab-certified benefit corporation.

== History ==
=== Founding and early years ===
The company was founded in 1790 in Boston, Massachusetts, by Henry Wood. Wood was primarily an importer and distributor, originally of English-milled flour. The business grew quickly, and Wood took on a partner in the early 1790s, forming Henry Wood & Company. Benjamin F. Sands took over the company in 1870, renaming it to reflect his ownership interest. In 1895, the company was reorganized as a joint-stock company, named Sands, Taylor & Wood Company after its then owners: Orin Sands, Mark Taylor, and George Wood (no relation to Henry Wood).

=== 1896 branding ===
In 1896, Sands, Taylor & Wood introduced a new brand of premium flour. George Wood had attended a performance of the musical King Arthur and the Knights of the Round Table, which inspired the name of the new product: King Arthur Flour. The brand was introduced at the Boston Food Fair on September 10, 1896, and had substantial commercial success.

With Orin Sands's death in 1917, control of the company passed to his son, Frank E. Sands. As the market for retail flour declined, the company expanded into the commercial bakery market, first with wholesale flours and later (in the 1960s) into commercial baking equipment. Sands, Taylor & Wood also introduced other retail food products under the King Arthur name, including a line of coffee.

=== Relocation ===
Sands, Taylor & Wood acquired Joseph Middleby, a maker of baking supplies, such as prepared pie fillings, in 1973. Three years later, that business was expanded with the purchase of H.A. Johnson. As interest rates rose through the 1970s, financial pressures forced the company to change strategy, and in 1978 then-president Frank E. Sands II sold off all but the core flour business and relocated the company from Brighton, Massachusetts, to Norwich, Vermont. As of 1990, the company had only five employees; it hired its sixth that year, P. J. Hamel. Hamel was brought in to develop a catalog and increase the company's sales outside of New England.

Co-owner Brinna Sands, wife of Frank Sands II, is credited with starting the bakery and school; according to the former director of the Norwich retail bakery and baking school Jeffrey Hamelman, she was "a visionary. She's the one who felt like King Arthur would never be a truly complete company just selling flour. It's got to be showcasing what the flour can do."

=== Conversion to employee-owned structure and expansion into retail ===
Sands, Taylor & Wood Company converted to an employee-owned business structure in 1996, and also changed its name to The King Arthur Flour Co., Inc., reflecting its principal brand. The company has been 100% employee-owned through an Employee Stock Ownership Plan (ESOP) since 2004. Employees who log more than 800 hours of work per year following their first year of employment are eligible to become owners through the ESOP. In 2007 it became a B corporation.

As of 2014 the company had been named one of the Best Places to Work in Vermont every year since the inception of the award in 2006. In 2016 it was named Company of the Year by the Employee Stock Ownership Plan Association.

In 2016 the company opened a second baking school in Burlington, Washington, at the Washington State University Bread Lab.

2020 rebranding

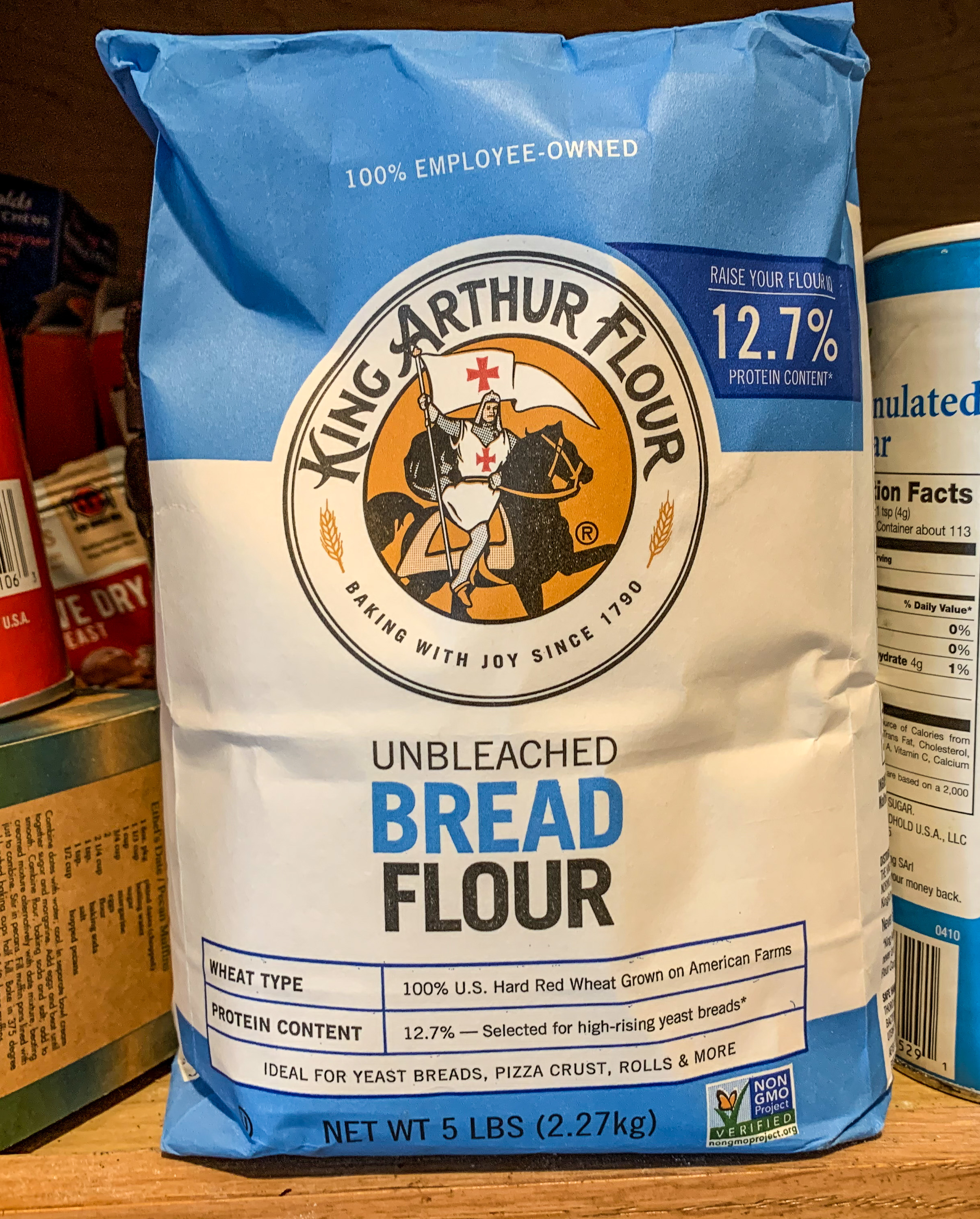
Bread flour packaging before 2020 rebranding

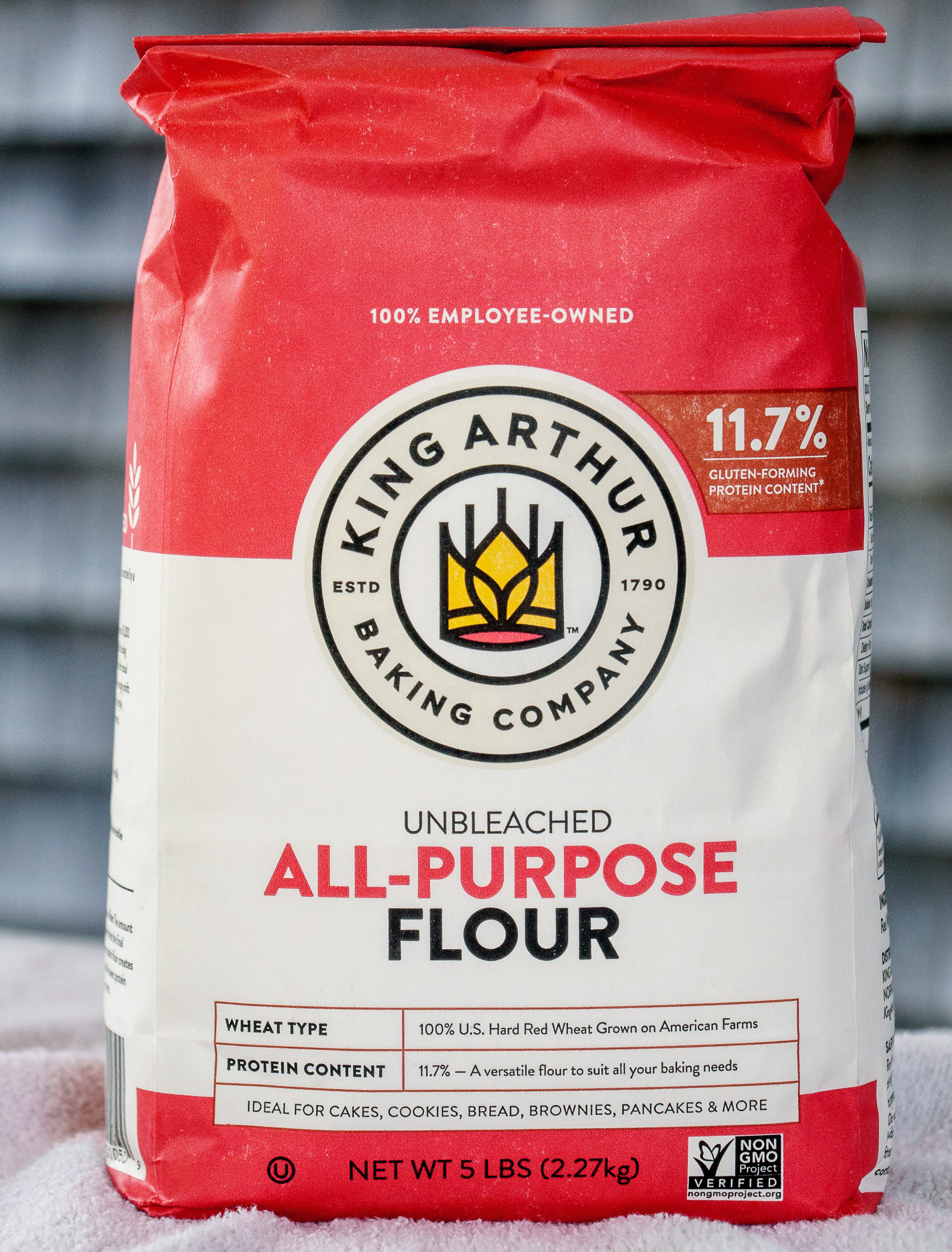
All-purpose flour packaging after 2020 rebranding

=== 2020 rebranding ===
In July 2020 King Arthur Flour changed its name to the King Arthur Baking Company Inc. to better reflect its products and services other than flour, and the logo was changed from a medieval knight riding a charger to a wheat-themed crown.

As of 2020 the company had 365 employees.

=== COVID-19 pandemic ===
The 2020 rebranding change coincidentally was launched several months into the COVID-19 pandemic, when retail flour sales had exploded. Before the pandemic, the company's rebranding studies had found that many of their customers engaged in stress baking, meaning that they baked at home to bring joy to themselves and others during stressful times.

The company's flour sales in March 2020 were approximately twenty times what the previous year's sales had been, and industry-wide, sales of flour, yeast, and many other baking supplies in the US had doubled or tripled – the re-branding happened during a time of significant and unexpected sales growth.

The COVID-19 pandemic caused a sudden leap in the company's business as newly-homebound workers across the country developed hobbies they had not previously had the time at home to indulge, such as bread baking. The increase in home baking also was associated with retail bakery closings due to the pandemic, which meant those bakeries' customers could not access their bread providers. The month of March is typically a slow time for the company, which experiences a rise in sales for the winter holidays and then another one for the Easter season. From the week of March 16, both consumer and grocery store orders increased over the previous year and calls to the company's baking advice line spiked unusually. Unlike the COVID-19 shortages caused by hoarding, such as toilet paper and hand sanitizer, people were actually buying flour, using it, and wanting to buy more. The shortages were not due to a shortage of wheat or milling capacity but to bagging capacity for 5-pound bags of flour; in response the company developed a 3-pound bag.

In the spring of 2020, their webpages covering sourdough bread saw an increase in traffic due to the number of people baking during the pandemic. Calls to the company's advice line spiked, requiring them to increase the size of that team. The company created additional recipes and baking tutorials online and launched several bake along show series, including The Isolation Baking Show, which featured Hamelman and Gesine Bullock-Prado baking together but socially distanced, Martin Bakes at Home, featuring one of the company's professional bakers demonstrating artisan-style baking with typical home-kitchen equipment and ingredients, and Baking with Kids, which featured instructors baking at home with their own children.

=== Post-2020 ===
In June 2026, it was announced that King Arthur would be opening up a permanent retail location and baking school in Alexandria, Virginia.

== Activities ==
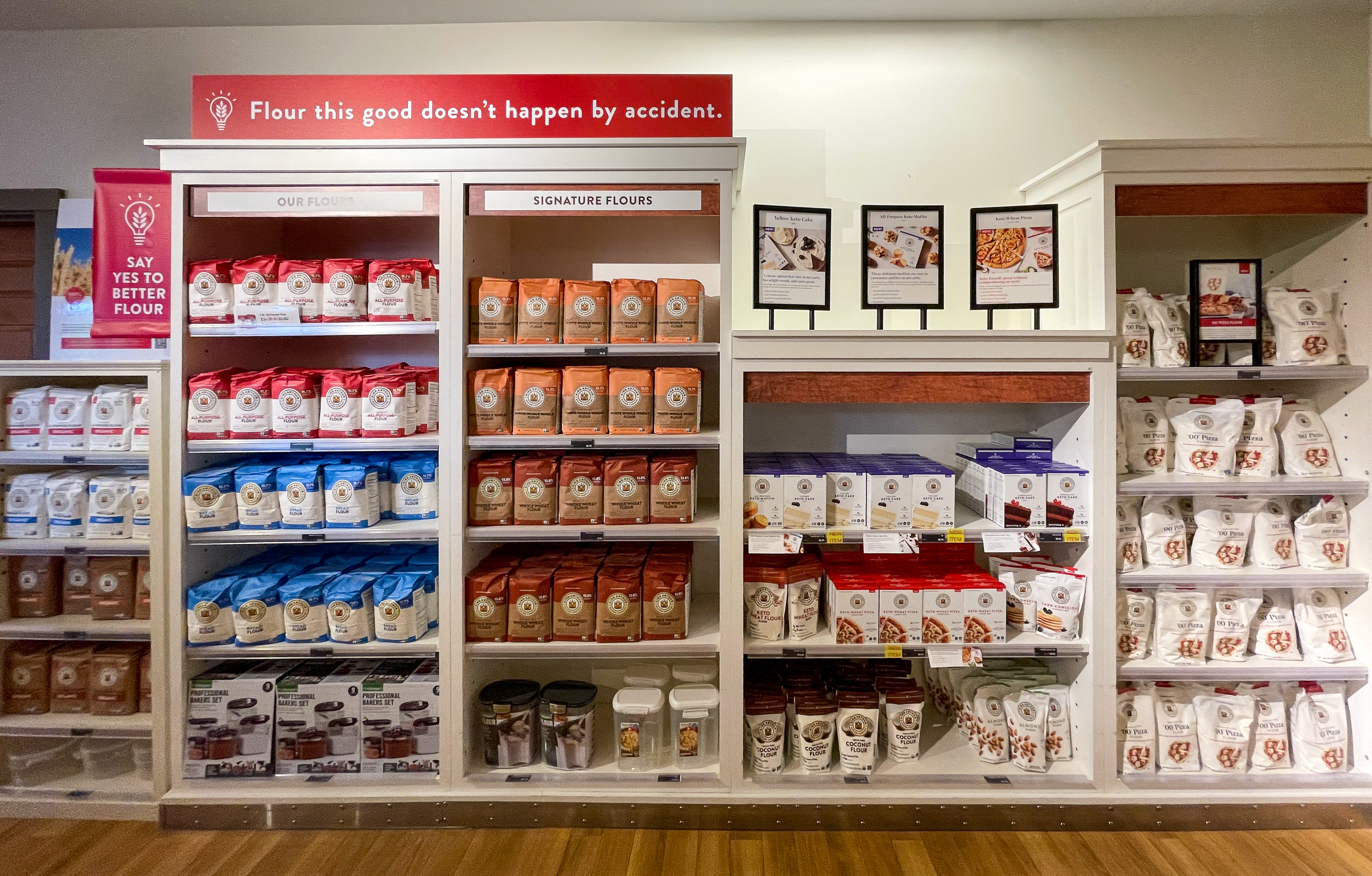
Sacks of flour at the company's retail store in Norwich, Vermont

In addition to its wholesale flour business, King Arthur also sells baking equipment, ingredients, baking mixes, and cookbooks directly to consumers through its catalog, The Baker's Catalogue, website, and at its flagship store, The Baker's Store, located in Norwich, Vermont. It runs a baking advice service, has published cookbooks, and offers classes.

=== Retail sales and building ===
The company has sold flour and other baking supplies directly to consumers since the 1990s, first via their catalog and then also online. Mark Bittman called out King Arthur Flour's whole-grain flours as among the best and most precisely produced in the industry.

In 2000, the company opened a retail building that includes a bakery, café, retail store, and baking school in Norwich, Vermont. CBS Saturday Morning called it "the Mecca of Baking".

=== Cookbooks and website ===
The company has also published four cookbooks, including the King Arthur 200th Anniversary Cookbook and the King Arthur Flour Baker's Companion, the latter of which was a James Beard Award winner for Cookbook of the Year in 2003.

The website also offers recipes, baking demonstrations and advice, online ordering, and virtual classes.

=== Baker's Hotline ===
Since 1993 the company has offered baking advice through their Baker's Hotline service, which operates both as a call center and via online chat and digital media.

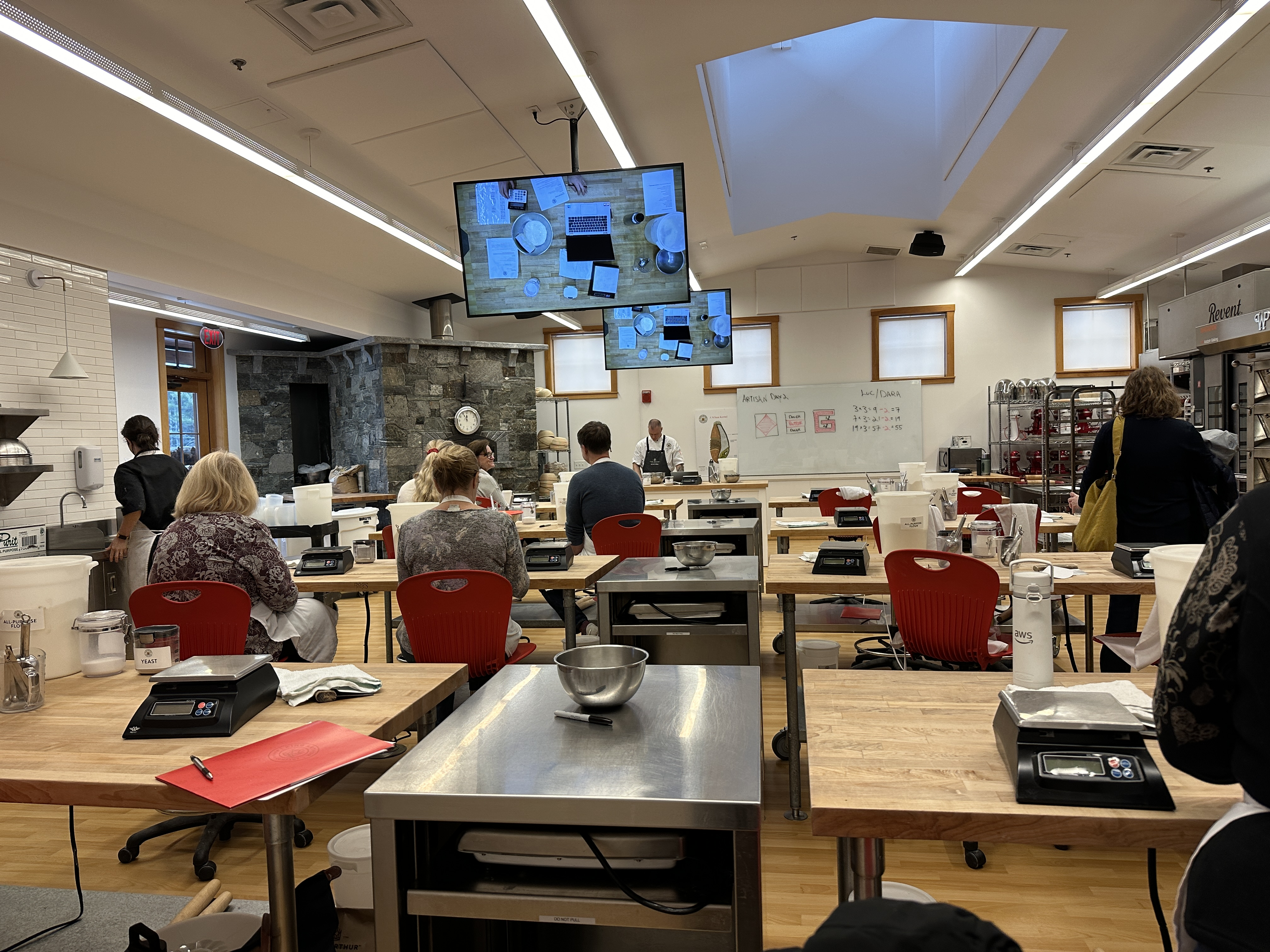
Baking school classroom in Norwich, Vermont

=== King Arthur Baking School and The Bread Lab ===
The company offers in-person baking classes at its Norwich store and at Washington State University's Bread Lab in Burlington, Washington, and also offers classes virtually. Both locations offer classes for home bakers of all skill levels and for professional bakers. As of 2020 the school's Baking Director was Amber Eisler.

In 2018 King Arthur's Jeff Yankellow developed the Bread Lab's Approachable Loaf recipe for a commercially-produced loaf that would be healthy, tasty and priced affordably. The bread is produced commercially by bakeries in multiple states and in several countries; King Arthur sells it in its retail store under the name Just Bread.

=== Baking Pitchfest ===
In 2024, King Arthur announced it would hold a baking contest, Baking Pitchfest, for bakeries and baked goods brands owned by persons of color, with a stated mission of helping to remove barriers to entry into the field, with the winner to receive mentorship and financial backing to help grow their brands and businesses. The project drew criticism from conservatives who accused the company of reverse racism. The competition was planned as a two-day event in May 2024 at the company's Vermont headquarters.

=== Bake for Good ===
The company operates a school program, Bake for Good, which teaches students to bake and encourages them to donate baked goods within their communities.
