= Cherrybrook Kitchen =

American bakery

- Company type: Private
- Industry: Food
- Founded: 2004
- Headquarters: Burlington, Massachusetts, United States
- Key people: Patsy Rosenberg, Founder
- Products: Allergen-free baking mixes
- Website: cherrybrookkitchen.com

Cherrybrook Kitchen is a privately held company producing baking products for the food allergy market. The company was founded in 2004 by Patsy Rosenberg and is headquartered in Burlington, Massachusetts. The company was acquired by Cell-nique in 2011.

Cherrybrook Kitchen was founded in response to the growing number of children and adults diagnosed with food allergies. 11 million adults and children are affected by peanut, dairy, egg and nut allergens, while approximately one in 133 Americans has Celiac Disease. Cherrybrook Kitchen offers two lines of gourmet baking mixes: Original and Gluten Free. The Original Line includes all-natural gourmet baking mixes that are free of peanuts, dairy, eggs and nuts; the gluten free line, introduced in 2005 as Gluten Free Dreams, is made with rice flour and is free of gluten and wheat in addition to peanuts, dairy, eggs and nuts. .

In 2009, the firm announced a new partnership with Arthur, the award-winning book series and PBS program.

The firm received a 2008 Kids Food Award from Kiwi Magazine and was recently named one of Parents Magazine's "Best Snacks for Kids with Food Allergies."

== Manufacturing ==
All of Cherrybrook Kitchen's products are produced in a completely nut-free facility using dedicated equipment that do not share dairy or egg products. The mixes are routinely tested for allergen cross-contaminants. All of its products have been accepted by the Feingold Association, an organization dedicated to helping children and adults establish allergen-free diets. The mixes are also kosher, vegan certified and cholesterol free.
