= Arrowhead Mills =

Breakfast cereal brand

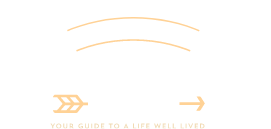
- Product type: Organic baking mixes, flours, grains, cereals
- Current owner: Hometown Food Company
- Country: United States
- Introduced: 1960
- Markets: United States
- Previous owners: The Hain Celestial Group, Inc.; Arrowhead Mills, Inc.
- Website: arrowheadmills.com

Arrowhead Mills is an American brand of grain-based foods, including organic baking mixes, flours, beans, seeds and breakfast cereals.

The brand was founded in 1960 by organic farmer and nutrition advocate Frank Ford in Hereford, Texas, and became one of the early commercial producers of stone-ground, pesticide-free flours in the United States.

== History ==
Arrowhead Mills was founded in 1960 by Frank Ford in Hereford, the seat of Deaf Smith County in the Texas Panhandle, west of Amarillo. Ford began by growing wheat on the High Plains using organic methods at a time when chemical fertilizers and pesticides were becoming standard in U.S. agriculture. Seeking to market flour that retained the bran and germ, he purchased a stone mill, ground his own grain and supplied whole-wheat flour locally, selling the sacks directly to stores from his pickup truck.

During the 1960s, Ford expanded from wheat into other grains grown without synthetic pesticides and continued to mill them on stone equipment. By the early 1970s, Arrowhead Mills was distributing an expanding range of natural foods and was described as one of the country's larger wholesalers in the emerging natural and organic foods sector, with a catalogue running to more than a hundred items and warehouses serving a national network of distributors.

In 1998, the brand left founder ownership when Hain Food Group (later The Hain Celestial Group, Inc.) agreed to acquire Arrowhead Mills, along with several other natural foods businesses, from investment firm The Shansby Group and other owners. Hain Celestial's 2001 annual report lists Arrowhead Mills among the group's principal brands and notes the July 1, 1998 completion date of the acquisition.

In 2019, Hain Celestial sold the Arrowhead Mills and SunSpire brands to Chicago-based Hometown Food Company for US$15 million in a transaction that included the Hereford, Texas manufacturing plant and its employees. Hometown Food is a portfolio company of Brynwood Partners.

== Products ==
Products include:

1. Breakfast Foods, including cold and hot cereals, granola, and pancake/waffle mixes;
2. Flours, including white, rye, spelt, oat, and millet flours among other grains;
3. Baking Ingredients, such as wheat germ and wheat gluten;
4. Baking mixes, such as bread mixes, pie crusts, and dessert mixes;
5. Beans, such as Anasazi beans, green lentils, and soybeans;
6. Grains, including ancient grains such as amaranth and quinoa;
7. Seeds, including flax seeds and popcorn;
8. Rice of several varieties; and
9. Cooking Mixes, such as stuffing mix.

== See also ==
- List of food companies
