= Pumpkin bread =

Type of moist quick bread made with pumpkin

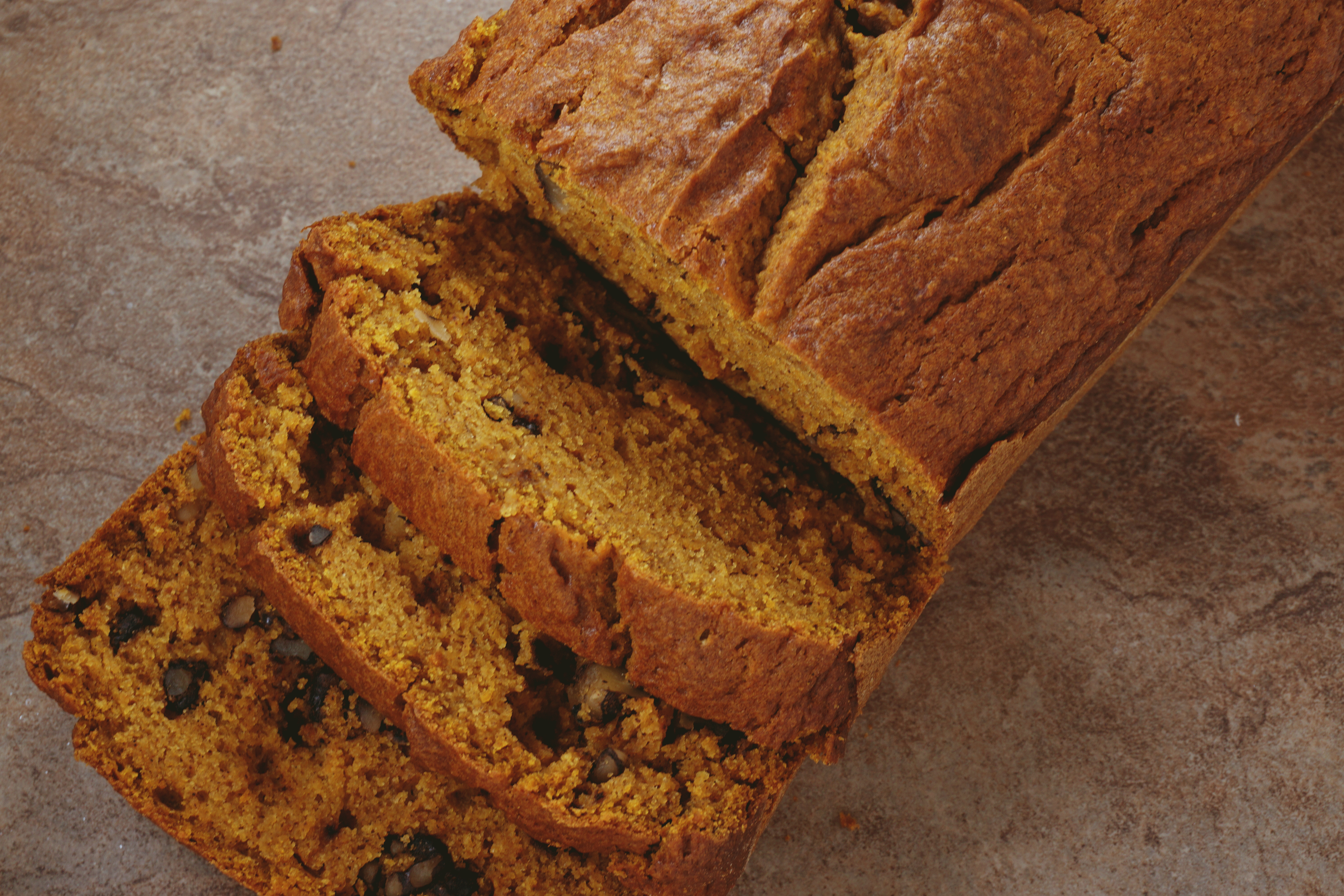
- Pumpkin walnut bread
- Type: Quick bread
- Place of origin: United States
- Main ingredients: Pumpkin

Pumpkin bread is a type of moist quick bread made with pumpkin. The pumpkin can be cooked and softened before being used or simply baked with the bread; using canned pumpkin renders it a simpler dish to prepare. Additional ingredients include nuts (such as walnuts), raisins and chocolate chips.

Pumpkin bread is usually baked in a rectangular loaf pan and is often made in late fall when fresh pumpkins are available. It can be made into muffins by using a cupcake pan. It can also be made from canned pumpkin, resulting in a stronger pumpkin taste.

== See also ==
- Banana bread
- Zucchini bread
- List of squash and pumpkin dishes
- List of quick breads
