= Duncan Hines =

American businessman, writer, food critic

- Born: March 26, 1880; Bowling Green, Kentucky, U.S.
- Died: March 15, 1959 (aged 78); Bowling Green, Kentucky, U.S.
- Education: Bowling Green Business University
- Occupations: Businessman, writer, food critic
- Spouses: Florence Chaffin Hines (m. 1905; died 1938); Emelie Tolman (m. 1939; div. 1945); Clara Wright Nahm (m. 1947)

Duncan Hines (March 26, 1880 – March 15, 1959) was an American author and food critic who produced restaurant ratings for travelers. He branched out to marketing food under his name, which continues as a brand in the present.

== Early life, family and education ==
Hines was born in Bowling Green, Kentucky, the son of a former Confederate soldier. His mother died when he was four years old, and he was raised by his grandmother.

Hines attended Bowling Green Business University, which later merged with what is now Western Kentucky University. He worked in the American West for Wells Fargo and other companies before settling in Chicago, Illinois.

== Writing career ==
Hines worked as a traveling salesman for a Chicago printer, and he had eaten many meals on the road across the United States by 1935 when he was 55. At this time, there was no American interstate highway system and only a few chain restaurants, except in large populated areas. Therefore, travelers depended on local restaurants.

Hines and his wife Florence began assembling a list for friends of several hundred good restaurants around the country. The list became popular and he began selling the paperback book Adventures in Good Eating (1935), highlighting restaurants and their featured dishes that Hines had personally enjoyed in locations across the United States.

One such listing in the 1939 edition read:

Corbin, KY. Sanders Court and Café
41 — Jct. with 25, 25 E. ½ Mi. N. of Corbin. Open all year except Xmas.
A very good place to stop en route to Cumberland Falls and the Great Smokies. Continuous 24-hour service. Sizzling steaks, fried chicken, country ham, hot biscuits. L. 50¢ to $1; D., 60¢ to $1

The book proved so successful that Hines added another which recommended lodging. In the late 1940s and early 1950s, Hines wrote the newspaper food column Adventures in Good Eating at Home, which appeared in newspapers across the US three times a week on Sunday, Tuesday, and Thursday. The column featured restaurant recipes adapted for home cooks that he had collected during his nationwide travels.

== Entrepreneurial career ==
In 1952, Duncan Hines introduced Duncan Hines bread through the Durkee's Bakery Company of Homer, New York. Principals Albert Durkee, and Lena Durkee were the bakery proprietors. This was Duncan Hines' first foray into baked goods.

By 1953, Hines sold the right to use his name and the title of his book to Roy H. Park to form Hines-Park Foods, which licensed the name to a number of food-related businesses. The cake mix license was sold to Nebraska Consolidated Mills in Omaha, Nebraska, which developed and sold the first Duncan Hines cake mixes.

In 1957, Nebraska Consolidated Mills sold the cake mix business to the U.S. consumer products company Procter & Gamble. The company expanded the business to the national market and added a series of related products.

Also in 1957, Hines appeared as a guest challenger on the TV panel show To Tell the Truth.

Hines died of lung cancer at his home in Bowling Green on March 15, 1959, at the age of 78. He was buried in Fairview Cemetery in Bowling Green, at the same series of Hines family plots as Thomas Hines.

== Legacy ==
Duncan Hines logo

The Duncan Hines brand is owned by Conagra Brands, the name for Nebraska Consolidated Mills, which was the original owner of the brand. Conagra reacquired the brand through its acquisition, in 2018, of Pinnacle Foods which bought it from Procter & Gamble in 1997.

Hines is honored in his hometown of Bowling Green, and a portion of U.S. Route 31W north of the city was named the Duncan Hines Highway after his death. A museum exhibit at Western Kentucky University's Kentucky Museum in Bowling Green showcases Duncan Hines.

== Publications ==
- Hines, Duncan (1935). Adventures in Good Eating. Chicago: Adventures in Good Eating, Inc.
- Hines, Duncan (1938). Lodging for a Night. Chicago: Adventures in Good Eating, Inc.
- Hines, Duncan (1939). Adventures in Good Cooking (Famous Recipes) and the Art of Carving in the home. Bowling Green: Adventures in Good Eating, Inc.
- Hines, Duncan (1955). The Duncan Hines Barbecue Cook Book. Hemp and Company.
- Hines, Duncan (1955). The Duncan Hines Dessert Book. Pocket Books.
- Hines, Duncan (1955). Duncan Hines' Food Odyssey. Thomas Y. Crowell Company.
- Hines, Duncan (2014). Hatchett, Louis (ed.). The Duncan Hines Dessert Book. Foreword by Jane Stern and Michael Stern (Reprint ed.). The University Press of Kentucky. ISBN 978-0865548107.
