= Quick bread =

Baked goods leavened with agents other than yeast

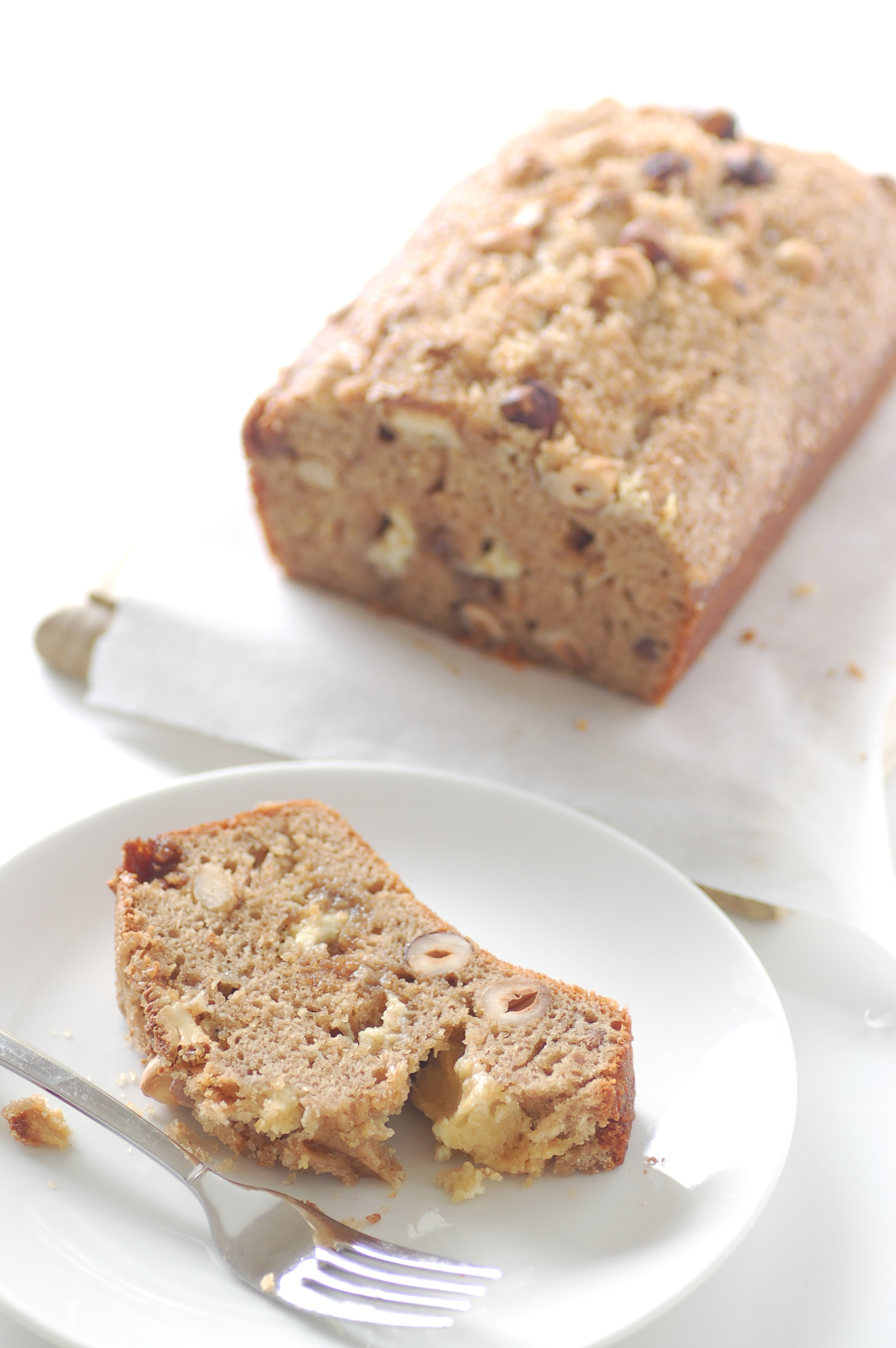
- Banana bread is a type of quick bread
- Type: Bread

Quick bread is any baked goods leavened with a chemical leavening agent rather than a biological one like yeast or sourdough starter. An advantage of quick breads is their ability to be prepared quickly and reliably, without requiring the time-consuming skilled labor and the climate control needed for traditional yeast breads.

Quick breads include many cakes, brownies and cookies—as well as banana bread, pumpkin bread, beer bread, biscuits, cornbread, muffins, pancakes, scones, and soda bread.

== History ==
The name quick bread most likely originated in the United States at the end of the 19th century. However, the idea of a bread that used a rapid chemical leavening instead of a slow-rising yeast had been known for centuries before the name appeared. Before the creation of quick bread, most baked goods were leavened either with yeast or by mixing dough with eggs.

The discovery or rediscovery of chemical leavening agents and their widespread military, commercial, and home use in the United States dates back to 1846 with the introduction of commercial baking soda in New York, by Church and Dwight of "Arm & Hammer" fame. This development was extended in 1856 by the introduction of commercial baking powder in Massachusetts, although perhaps the best known form of baking powder is "Calumet", first introduced in Hammond, Indiana and West Hammond, Illinois (later Calumet City, Illinois) in 1889. Both forms of food-grade chemical leaveners are still being produced under their original names, although not within the same corporate structure.

During the American Civil War (1861–1865), the demand for portable and quickly-made food was high, while skilled labor for traditional breadmaking was scarce. This encouraged the adoption of bread which was rapidly made and leavened with baking soda, instead of yeast. The shortage of chemical leaveners in the American South during the Civil War contributed to a food crisis there.

As the Industrial Revolution accelerated, the marketing of mass-produced prepackaged foods was eased by the use of chemical leaveners, which could produce consistent products regardless of variations in source ingredients, time of year, geographical location, weather conditions, and many other factors that could cause problems with environmentally sensitive, temperamental yeast formulations. These factors were traded off against the loss of traditional yeast flavor, nutrition, and texture.

== Leavening process ==
Preparing a quick bread generally involves two mixing containers. One contains all dry ingredients (including chemical leavening agents or agent) and one contains all wet ingredients (possibly including liquid ingredients that are slightly acidic in order to initiate the leavening process). In some variations, the dry ingredients are in a bowl and the wet ingredients are heated sauces in a saucepan off-heat and cooled.

During the chemical leavening process, agents (one or more food-grade chemicals—usually a weak acid and a weak base) are added into the dough during mixing. These agents undergo a chemical reaction to produce carbon dioxide, which increases the baked good's volume and produces a porous structure and lighter texture. Yeast breads often take hours to rise, and the resulting baked good's texture can vary greatly based on external factors such as temperature and humidity. By contrast, breads made with chemical leavening agents are relatively uniform, reliable, and quick. Usually, the resulting baked good is softer and lighter than a traditional yeast bread.

Chemical leavening agents include a weak base, such as baking soda (sodium bicarbonate) plus a weak acid, such as cream of tartar, lemon juice, or cultured buttermilk, to create an acid–base reaction that releases carbon dioxide. (Quick bread leavened specifically with baking soda is often called "soda bread".) Baking powder contains both an acid and a base in dry powdered form, and simply needs a liquid medium in which to react. Other alternative leavening agents are egg whites mechanically beaten to form stiff peaks, as in the case of many waffle recipes, or steam, in the case of cream puffs. Nevertheless, in a commercial process, designated chemical leavening acids and bases are used to make gas production consistent and controlled. Examples of acid—base combinations include:

Leavening acids	Leavening bases
Citric acid; Tartaric acid; Glucono delta-lactone (GDL)	Potassium bicarbonate; Ammonium bicarbonate; Sodium bicarbonate

Almost all quick breads have the same basic ingredients: flour, leavening, eggs, fat (butter, margarine, shortening, or oil), and liquid such as milk. Ingredients beyond these basic constituents are added for variations in flavor and texture. The type of bread produced varies based predominantly on the method of mixing, the major flavoring, and the ratio of liquid in the batter. Some batters are thin enough to pour, and others thick enough to mold into lumps.

== Mixing methods ==
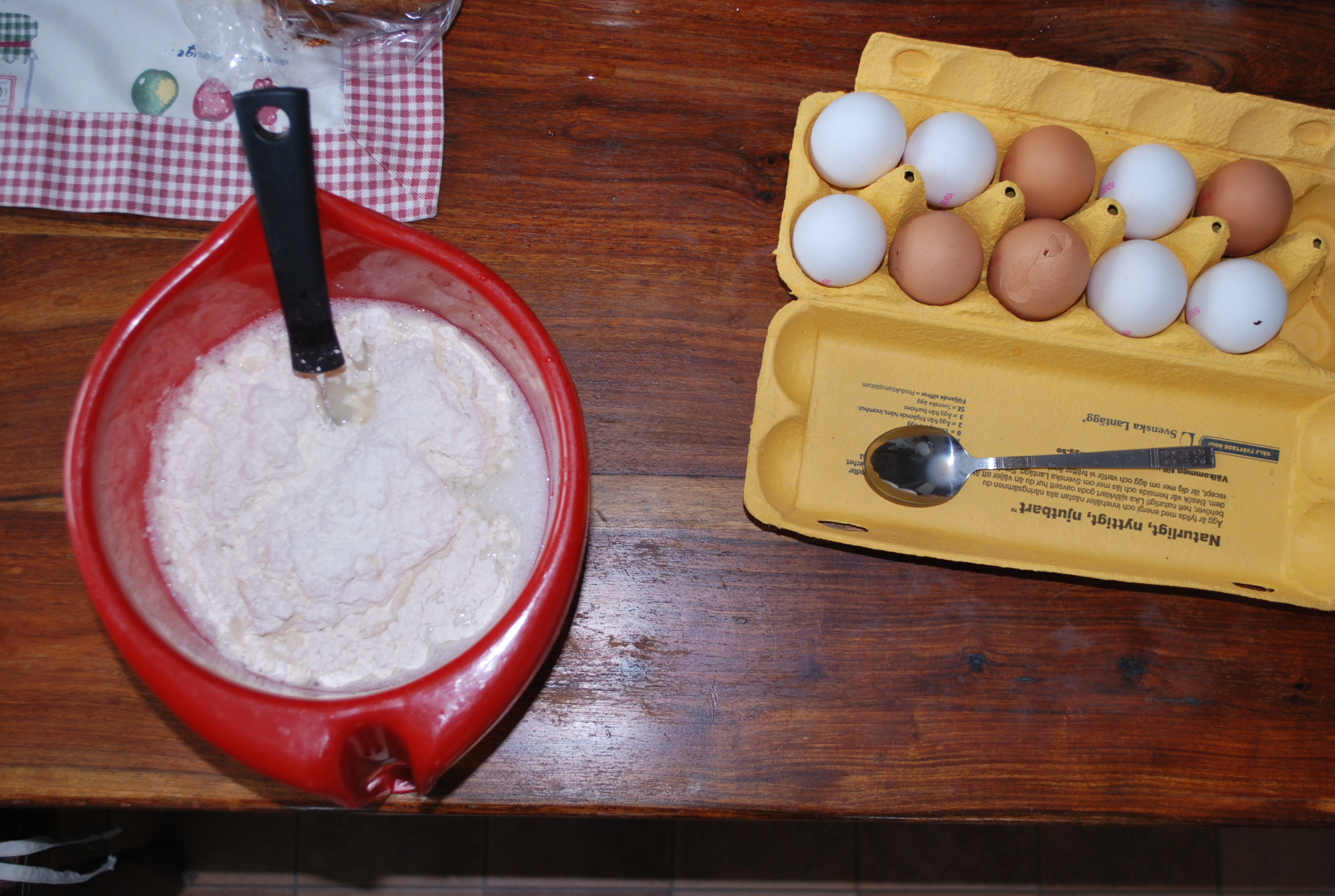
Pancake batter is made using the stirring method.

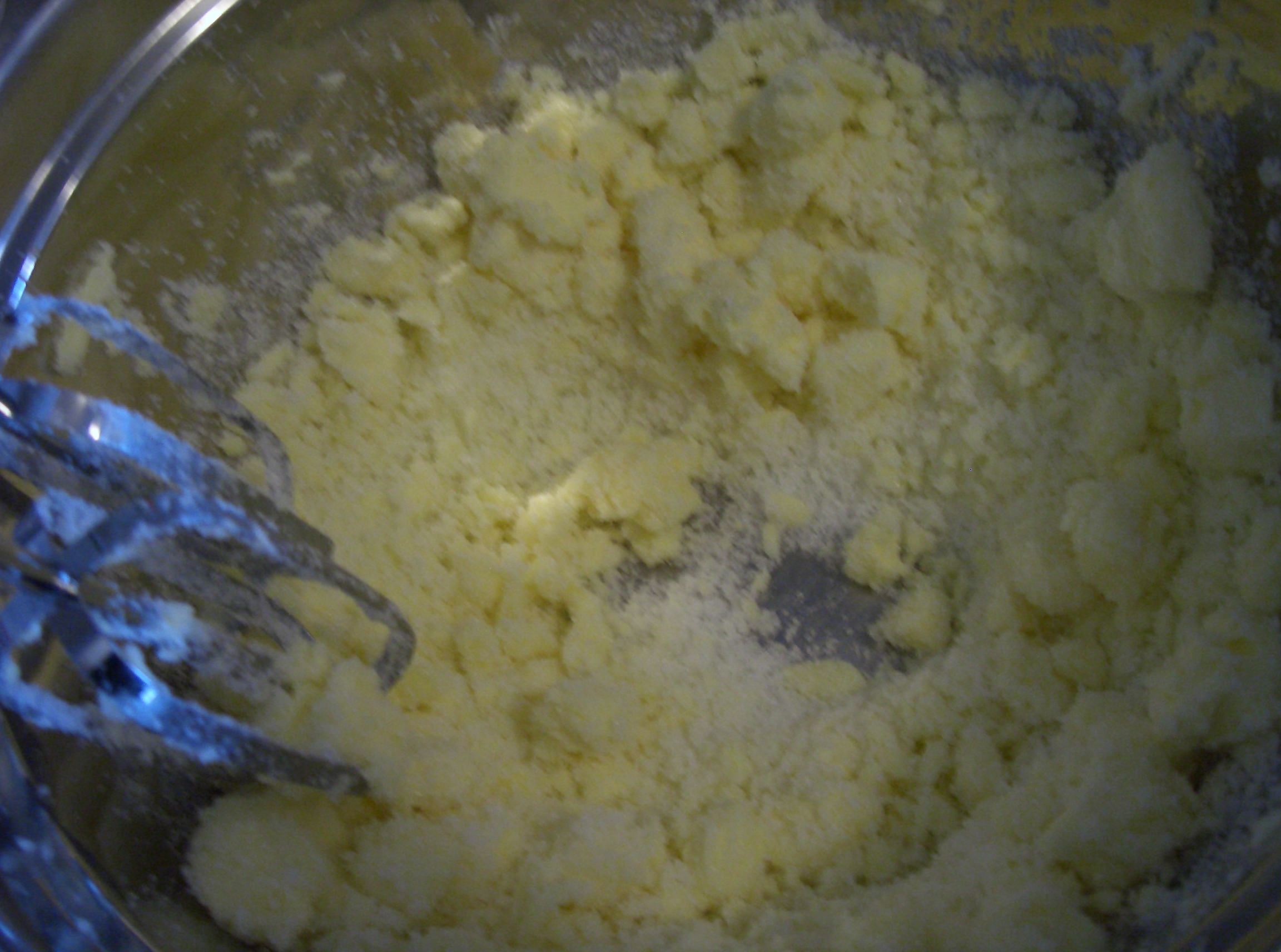
Layer cakes and shortbread cookies are made using the creaming method.

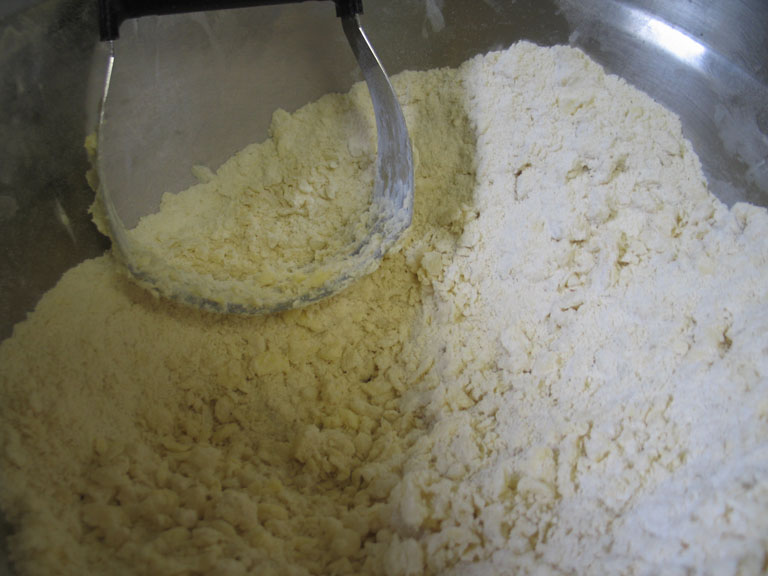
Pie crust is made using the shortening method.

There are three basic methods for making quick breads, which may combine the "rise" of the chemical leavener with advantageous "lift" from other ingredients:

- The stirring method (also known as the quick-bread method, blending method, or muffin method) is used for pancakes, muffins, corn bread, dumplings, and fritters. It calls for measurement of dry and wet ingredients separately, then quickly mixing the two. Often the wet ingredients include beaten eggs, which have trapped air that helps the product to rise. In these recipes, the fats are liquid, such as cooking oil. Usually mixing is done using a tool with a wide head such as a spoon or spatula to prevent the dough from becoming over-beaten, which would break down the egg's lift.
- The creaming method is frequently used for cake batters. The butter and sugar are "creamed", or beaten together until smooth and fluffy. Eggs and liquid flavoring are mixed in, and finally dry and liquid ingredients are added in. The creaming method combines rise gained from air bubbles in the creamed butter with the rise from the chemical leaveners. Gentle folding in of the final ingredients avoids destroying these air pockets.
- The shortening method, also known as the biscuit method, is used for biscuits and sometimes scones. This method cuts solid fat (whether lard, butter, or vegetable shortening) into flour and other dry ingredients using a food processor, pastry blender, or two hand-held forks. The layering from this process gives rise and adds flakiness as the folds of fat melt during baking. This technique is said to produce "shortened" cakes and breads, regardless of whether or not the chosen fat is vegetable shortening.

== Dough consistency ==
Quick breads also vary widely in the consistency of their dough or batter. There are four main types of quick bread batter:

- Pour batters, such as pancake batter, have a liquid-to-dry-ratio of about 1:1 and so pours in a steady stream. Also called a "low-ratio" baked good.
- Drop batters, such as cornbread and muffin batters, have a liquid-to-dry ratio of about 1:2.
- Soft doughs, such as many chocolate chip cookie doughs, have a liquid-to-dry ratio of about 1:3. Soft doughs stick significantly to work surfaces.
- Stiff doughs, such as pie crust and sugar cookie doughs, have a liquid-to-dry ratio of about 1:8. Stiff doughs are easy to work in that they only minimally stick to work surfaces, including tools and hands. Also called "high-ratio" baked good.

The above are volumetric ratios and are not based on baker's percentages or weights.

== Terminology ==
The term quick bread is common in the US and is not universally used in other English-speaking countries.

== See also ==
- Bread (especially the Composition and chemistry section)
- Cake mixing techniques
- List of baked goods
- List of quick breads
