= Beer bread =

Bread baked with beer in the dough

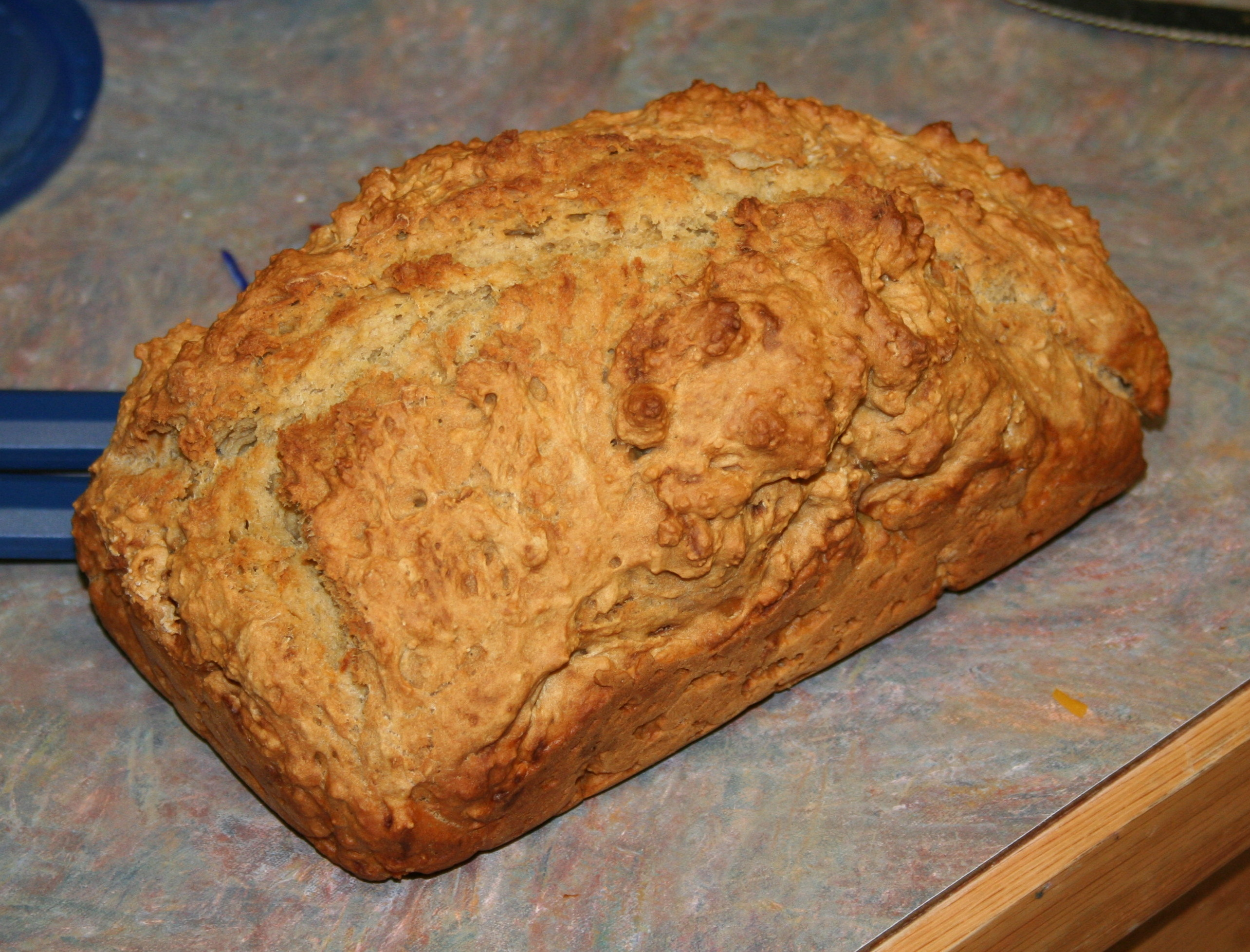
- Type: Bread
- Main ingredients: Flour, beer, sugar, leavening agent (baking soda or yeast)

Beer bread is any bread that includes beer in the dough mixture. Depending on the type of beer used, it may or may not contribute leavening to the baking process. Thus, beer breads range from heavy, unleavened loaves to light breads and rolls incorporating baker's yeast. The flavor of beer bread is sometimes enhanced with other flavors, such as cheese or herbs.

== Description ==
Beer bread can be a simple quick bread or a yeast bread flavored with beer. Beer and bread have a common creation process: yeast is used to turn sugars into carbon dioxide and alcohol. In the case of bread, a great percentage of the alcohol evaporates during the baking process.

Beer bread can be made simply with flour, beer, and sugar. Some bottled beers—especially craft beers—may intentionally have visible dormant, but live, yeast sediment at the bottom of the bottle. However, many mass-market beers have the live yeast filtered out. Without sufficient leavening from the beer, a loaf of beer bread will be fairly dense and heavy unless an additional leavening agent (e.g., baking soda, baking powder, baker's yeast and sugar, sourdough starter, or wild yeast cultured from the environment) is added. Self-raising flour may be used because it is a mixture of flour and leavening agent. Beer bread made without a leavening agent is very sturdy, but tends not to lose moisture when cooked for a long time; lengthier cooking tends to produce a thicker crust. Pre-packaged beer bread mixes, with the dry ingredients and leavening agents already included, are available to purchase.

Different styles of beer bread can be made by using different beers; for instance, a stout or dark beer will give a darker bread with more pronounced flavor. Using a beer that is spiced, or has a flavor added, will make a bread with a similar flavor, but less intense than the beer.

Any number of additional flavorings may be used to enhance the flavor of beer bread. They include cheddar and dill, sun-dried tomato and herb, garlic and feta, etc., added to the mix of dry ingredients. One consideration when choosing flavors is that if the beer bread is not going to be eaten straight away, the flavors will become enhanced upon storage.

== See also ==
- Beer batter, a coating for fried foods that uses beer
- Quick bread
- Vienna bread, bread developed from beer yeast
- Beer soup
