= List of flatbreads =

Flatbreads are the most common type of bread. There are many types of flatbread from many parts of the world. Flatbreads come in many shapes and sizes, with thicknesses ranging from below 1 millimeter to about 4 centimeters, and diameters ranging from around 5 to 70 centimeters.

Flatbreads are made of flour, often using cereal grains such as wheat, barley, maize, millet, sorghum, or rye. The flour is generally mixed with water and salt to form a dough. Leavening is sometimes added, which may include sourdough or baker's yeast. Other dough ingredients may include fat or oil, used as shortening. Some flatbreads have additional ingredients as fillings or toppings. Flatbreads may be baked with any method. Most types are baked on top of a griddle or in a vertical oven—such as a tandoor—while other types are baked in a domed oven or heated directly on embers. Some types are instead fried.

Flatbreads are categorized into two forms: double-layered and single-layered. Double-layered flatbreads are leavened and expand from gases while baking, which results in a separation between top and bottom. Single-layered flatbreads do not experience this, sometimes being punctured to prevent expansion. Single-layered flatbreads are further divided into unleavened versions, which are rolled thin, and leavened versions, which are thick and airy.

Pancakes, which are made of liquid batter rather than firm dough, may be considered a type of flatbread. Pancakes and pancake-like flatbreads are listed separately at List of pancakes.

== List ==
Name	Classification	Dough ingredients (Note: Excluding water, salt, and yeast)	Thickness	Diameter	Physical description	Baking method	Cuisine	Ref.
Aghrum	—	Semolina	—	—	—	—	North Africa (Kabyle)	
Arepa	Single-layered, unleavened	Maize flour; sometimes uses fillings	1–3 cm (0.4–1.2 in)	8–10 cm (3.1–3.9 in)	Round, with flat or convex top	Griddle (sometimes boiled before baking)	Americas (Colombia, Peru, Venezuela)	
Ash cake	Unleavened (usually)	Varies	—	—	—	Embers	Worldwide	
Bakarkhani	Leavened (yeast)	Wheat flour (refined), sugar, milk, ghee, almonds, raisins	—	—	—	Baked	South Asia (Pakistan)	
Baladi	Double-layered, leavened (sourdough, sometimes with additional yeast)	Wheat flour	1.25 cm (0.5 in)	20 cm (7.9 in)	Round with pocket	Oven	North Africa (Egypt, Sudan)	
Bammy	—	Cassava	—	—	Round	—	Americas (Jamaica)	
Bannock	Unleavened; less commonly leavened (sodium bicarbonate)	Oats or barley flour or wheat flour	—	—	Round, thick, the size of a plate; some versions use elaborate ingredients including lard	Griddle; historically ember-baked before placing on griddle	Europe (Scotland)	
Bannock	Leavened (baking powder)	Wheat flour (refined), fat, sugar; sometimes milk, eggs, fruits (such as berries), or nuts	—	—	Round, large	Oven, campfire, cast iron pan, or fried	Americas (Indigenous Canadian, including Inuit)	
Barbari bread	Single-layered, leavened (sourdough or yeast)	Wheat flour (or barley flour)	2.5–3 cm (1.0–1.2 in)	70–80 cm (28–31 in) by 25–30 cm (10–12 in)	Oval, heavy	Brick oven (partially pregelatinized)	West Asia (Iran, Afghanistan)	
Bataw	Single-layered, unleavened	Wheat flour, maize flour, fenugreek	—	50 cm (20 in)	Round, thin	—	—	
Batbout	Double-layered, leavened	—	—	—	—	—	North Africa (Morocco)	
Bati	Unleavened	Wheat flour, fat	1.5 cm (0.6 in)	5 cm (2.0 in)	Ball-shaped, hard and crusty, low in moisture and high in fat	—	South Asia (Rajasthan)	
Bazlama	Single-layered, leavened (sourdough)	—	3 cm (1.2 in)	10–20 cm (3.9–7.9 in)	—	Griddle	West Asia (Turkey, Middle East)	
Bhakri	Single-layered, unleavened	Sorghum flour, finger millet flour, pearl millet flour, rice flour	3 mm (0.1 in)	15–20 cm (5.9–7.9 in)	Round	Griddle	South Asia (Western India)	
Bhatura	Single-layered, leavened (sodium bicarbonate and yogurt)	Wheat flour	2 mm (0.1 in)	15–20 cm (5.9–7.9 in)	Round, puffy	Deep-fried	South Asia (North India, Pakistan)	
Carchiola	Single-layered, unleavened	Cornmeal	2 cm (0.8 in)	—	Hard	Reversible grill in fireplace	Europe (Basilicata)	
Casabe	—	Cassava flour	—	—	Similar to arepa	—	Americas (Caribbean coast, including Venezuela, Garifuna)	
Chapati (Note: Also called roti or phulka)	Single-layered, unleavened	Wheat flour (atta) or other flour (sorghum or pearl millet)	2 mm (0.1 in)	15–20 cm (5.9–7.9 in)	Round, thin, bubbly with brown spots	Griddle, then placed over a direct flame	Worldwide, originally South Asia (North India, Pakistan, Bangladesh), also commonly East Africa (Kenya, Uganda, Tanzania)	
Chipa	Varies (may be flatbreads or rolls)	—	—	—	Crisp	—	Americas (Paraguay)	
Chorek	Single-layered, leavened	—	—	—	Pressed with decorative stamps	—	Central Asia (Turkmenistan)	
Cong you bing (Note: Also called green onion pancake)	Unleavened or leavened (yeast)	Wheat flour (refined), oil (or lard), scallions	—	—	Round with spiraling layers, varying textures	Griddle	East Asia (China)	
Crescenta	Single-layered, leavened (yeast)	Wheat flour, lard, diced ham, diced bacon	—	—	—	—	Europe (Emilia-Romagna and Tuscany)	
Crescenta fritta	Double-layered, leavened (sodium bicarbonate)	Wheat flour, milk, pork fat (strutto)	—	—	Diamond-shaped	Deep-fried	Europe (Emilia-Romagna and Tuscany)	
Crescentina modenese	Single-layered, leavened (yeast or sodium bicarbonate); historically unleavened	Wheat flour; sometimes milk and lard	1.5 cm (0.6 in)	15 cm (5.9 in)	Decorative imprint from griddle	Between clay plates held in fire	Europe (Emilia-Romagna)	
Crescia sfogliata	Single-layered, unleavened	Wheat flour, egg, pork fat (strutto), black pepper	—	—	—	Cast-iron pan	Europe (Marche)	
Crostolo	Single-layered, unleavened	Wheat flour, egg, milk, black pepper	—	—	Round with spiral layers, blackened stripes	Grill	Europe (Emilia-Romagna and Marche)	
Crumpet	—	—	—	—	—	Griddle	Europe (Britain)	
Damper	—	Wheat flour; historically seed flour	—	—	—	Campfire	Oceania (Aboriginal Australian)	
Dhebra	—	Finger millet; sometimes additionally wheat flour and chickpea flour	—	—	—	—	South Asia (India, particularly Rajasthan and Guajrat)	
English muffin	Single-layered, leavened (yeast)	Wheat flour, milk, butter; coated in cornmeal	—	—	Round with straight edges, chewy, light-colored	Griddle, then oven	—	
Farl	—	Wheat flour, oatmeal	—	—	Thin, triangular or quarter-circle	—	Europe (Scotland)	
Flatbrød	—	Barley flour	—	—	—	—	Europe (Norway)	
Flatkaka	Single-layered, unleavened	Rye and/or barley flour; sometimes milk products	1 cm (0.4 in)	—	Round, dense	Oven	Europe (Scandinavia)	
Focaccia	Single-layered, leavened (yeast)	Wheat flour, olive oil; sometimes topped with rosemary or other ingredients	1.25–5 cm (0.5–2.0 in)	20 cm (7.9 in)	Various shapes, similar dough to pizza	Oven	Europe (Italy)	
Fougasse	—	Wheat flour; other ingredients vary	—	—	Large	—	Europe (France)	
Frena	—	Flour, olive oil, nigella	—	—	—	Baked on pebbles	North Africa (Originally Morocco; also Israel)	
Frybread	Leavened (sometimes baking powder)	Wheat flour, milk, oil	—	—	—	Fried	Americas (Indigenous North American)	
Girda	Single-layered, leavened	Wheat flour	2 mm (0.1 in)	15 cm (5.9 in)	Round	Tandoor or Griddle	South Asia (Kashmir)	
Gomme	Single-layered, unleavened	Flour, milk	Up to 5 cm (2.0 in)	35–40 cm (14–16 in)	Round	Griddle covered in ashes	West Asia (Turkey)	
Gnocco ingrassato	Single-layered, leavened (yeast)	Wheat flour, lard, diced ham	2–3 cm (0.8–1.2 in)	—	Rectangular	Oven	Europe (Emilia-Romagna)	
Gnocco fritto	Double-layered, leavened (sodium bicarbonate)	Wheat flour, pork fat (strutto)	5 mm (0.2 in)	5–15 cm (2.0–5.9 in)	Rectangular	Deep-fried	Europe (Emilia-Romagna)	
Gul poli	Stuffed, unleavened	Wheat flour; filled with jaggery, coconut, peanuts, sesame seeds, poppy seeds, cardamom	3 mm (0.1 in)	10–15 cm (3.9–5.9 in)	Round, crisp, sweet	Griddle	South Asia (Maharashtra)	
Hamursuz	Leavened	—	—	—	—	Vertical oven	West Asia (Turkey)	
Harcha	Unleavened	Semolina, fat	—	—	Rough	—	North Africa (Algeria)	
Himbasha	Leavened	Wheat flour, flavorings such as cardamom	—	—	Sweet	—	East Africa (Ethiopia, Eritrea)	
Jow	Single-layered, leavened	Barley flour	—	—	—	—	West Asia (Iran)	
Kaak	—	—	—	—	Very hard	Tandoor	South Asia (Balochistan)	
Kesra rakhis	Single-layered, unleavened	Semolina, fat	—	—	Firm, homogenous surface	—	North Africa (Algeria, Berber)	
Khamiri roti	Leavened (yeast or sodium bicarbonate)	Wheat flour, yogurt (or buttermilk), sugar, ghee, aniseed	—	—	Sweet	Griddle, tandoor, or deep-fried	South Asia (India, Pakistan)	
Khakhra	—	Wheat flour, mat bean, oil	—	—	Thin, crisp	—	South Asia	
Khobz el-dâr	Single-layered, leavened (sourdough or yeast)	Semolina, fat, milk, egg, sesame seeds	1–2 cm (0.4–0.8 in)	—	Round, docked with rectangular cuts	Oven	Africa (Morocco, Algeria)	
Khoshk	Single-layered, leavened	—	—	—	—	—	West Asia (Iran)	
Kitcha	Single-layered, unleavened or leavened	Teff flour, sometimes with sorghum or millet flour	—	—	—	—	East Africa (Ethiopia)	
Korsan	Single-layered, unleavened	Wheat flour (whole)	—	57 cm (22.4 in)	Round, thin	Oven	West Asia (Saudi Arabia)	
Kulcha	Single-layered, leavened	Wheat flour; various fillings or flavorings	3–4 mm (0.1–0.2 in)	10–12 cm (3.9–4.7 in)	Round	Tandoor	South Asia (Kashmir, Punjab)	
Laffa	—	—	—	—	Thin, soft; similar to pita	—	West Asia (originally Iraq and Yemen; also Israel)	
Lagana	Unleavened	Flour, sesame seeds	—	—	Fairly dry	—	Europe (Greece)	
Lahmacun	Single-layered, leavened (yeast)	Wheat flour; topped with minced meat and vegetables	—	—	Round, thin	Oven	West Asia (Turkey, Middle East)	
Lángos	Leavened (yeast)	—	—	—	Savory	Deep-fried	Europe (Hungary)	
Laobing	Single-layered, unleavened	—	—	23–26 cm (9.1–10.2 in) by 13–17 cm (5.1–6.7 in)	—	Griddle (shallow-fried)	East Asia (China)	
Laufabrauð	—	—	—	—	Thin	Fried	Europe (Iceland)	
Lavash	Single-layered, leavened (sourdough or yeast)	Wheat flour	2–5 mm (0.1–0.2 in)	20–70 cm (8–28 in) by 10–40 cm (4–16 in)	Oval or rectangular, sometimes dried	Clay oven	West Asia (including Armenia, Turkey)	
Lefse	—	Wheat flour, potato, milk (or cream); optionally lard	—	—	—	Griddle	Europe (Norway, Sweden)	
Lepeshka	Single-layered, leavened	—	—	—	—	—	Central Asia (Uzbekistan, Kazakhstan)	
Litti	Stuffed	Wheat flour; filled with sattu	—	—	—	Oven such as tandoor	South Asia (Bihar)	
Luchi	—	Wheat flour (refined), ghee	—	12.5–15 cm (4.9–5.9 in)	Round, puffy; similar to puri	Deep-fried	South Asia (Bengal)	
Maadjouna	Leavened	Semolina	—	—	—	—	North Africa (Algeria)	
Makki ki roti	Single-layered, unleavened	Maize flour	2–3 mm (0.1–0.1 in)	15 cm (5.9 in)	Round	Baked or sautéed	South Asia (Punjab)	
Maluj	Single-layered, leavened (sourdough or yeast)	Wheat flour (refined); some variations use barley flour	3–5 mm (0.1–0.2 in)	30–35 cm (12–14 in)	Round	Clay oven	West Asia (Yemen)	
Manakish	Leavened	Wheat flour; topped with ingredients such as cheese, chili pepper, minced lamb, za'atar, sesame seeds, sumac, or kashk	—	—	Various styles; griddled version is thin and crisp	Griddle or oven	West Asia (including Lebanon and Palestine)	
Markouk (Note: Also called mashrooh or mafrood)	Single-layered, unleavened	—	—	—	Very thin	—	West Asia (Lebanon, Palestine, Syria, Jordan, Saudi Arabia, UAE, Oman)	
Matloue	Single-layered, leavened (yeast)	Wheat flour, semolina	2.5 cm (1.0 in)	—	—	Griddle	Africa (Algeria)	
Matnakash	Single-layered, leavened	—	—	—	—	—	West Asia (Armenia)	
Matzah	Single-layered, unleavened	Wheat flour (whole); sometimes additional ingredients	—	—	Round or rectangular, thin, crisp, laminated, docked with even cuts	Oven	Worldwide (Jewish)	
Merahrah	Double-layered, leavened (sourdough)	Maize flour, ground fenugreek seeds	—	—	Round	—	North Africa (Egypt)	
Missi roti	Single-layered, unleavened	Wheat flour, chickpea flour	2–3 mm (0.1–0.1 in)	15 cm (5.9 in)	Round, yellow	Tandoor or Griddle	South Asia (Punjab)	
Mlinci	—	—	—	—	Thin	—	Europe (Balkans)	
Mo	—	—	—	—	Round, white, hard outside with soft inside	Steamed	East Asia (Shaanxi)	
Mont lay bway	—	Rice flour	—	—	Thin, crisp, airy	Fried	Southeast Asia (Myanmar)	
Murtabak	Stuffed	Filled with chicken, mutton or other meat	—	—	Folded	Fried	Southeast Asia (Malaysia, Singapore)	
Muufo (Note: Also called mkate wa mofa)	Single-layered, leavened	—	—	—	—	Oven (mofa)	East Africa (Somalia, Kenya)	
Naan	Single-layered, leavened (sourdough or yeast)	Wheat flour, yogurt (or milk), shortening; some variations use egg or various toppings	3 mm (0.1 in)	17 cm (6.7 in) by 12 cm (4.7 in) (Note: Historical versions of naan were 25 cm (9.8 in) by 13 cm (5.1 in) across.)	Teardrop-shaped, puffy; many styles (Note: The version in Uzbek cuisine is round, not teardrop-shaped, and pressed with decorative stamps.)	Tandoor	Worldwide, originally South Asia (North India, Pakistan) and Central Asia	
Ngome	—	Millet flour, vegetable oil	—	—	—	—	West Africa (Mali)	
Oatcake	Sometimes leavened (yeast, sourdough)	Oatmeal; sometimes fat	—	—	Various styles	Griddle or oven	Europe (British Isles, particularly Scotland)	
Pane carasau	Leavened (sodium bicarbonate; some versions use yeast or sourdough)	Semolina (Note: A variant, pane guttiau, adds olive oil.)	1–2 mm (0.0–0.1 in)	—	Round or rectangular, thin, crisp, sliced to separate layers	Oven (twice-baked)	Europe (Sardinia)	
Papadam	—	Non-grain flour (lentil, chickpea, or potato); sometimes spices such as ajwain	—	About 8 cm (3.1 in) (Note: A variant, papad, is about 22 cm (8.7 in) across and slightly thinner.)	Thin, crisp	Fried; dried before cooking	South Asia (North India)	
Paratha	Multilayered, unleavened	Wheat flour (whole or refined), shortening	2–3 mm (0.1–0.1 in)	15 cm (5.9 in)	Round, square, or triangular, with folded or spiraling layers	Shallow-fried	South Asia (North India)	
Paratha, stuffed	Stuffed, unleavened	Wheat flour; filled with spiced vegetables such as potatoes	3 mm (0.1 in)	15 cm (5.9 in)	Round	Shallow-fried	South Asia (North India)	
Panigaccio	Double-layered, leavened	—	—	—	—	Griddle (testo)	Europe (Tuscany)	
Parotta	Multilayered, unleavened	Wheat flour; optionally egg and sugar	2 mm (0.1 in)	15 cm (5.9 in)	Round with spiraling layers, cream-colored	Shallow-fried	South Asia (South India)	
Piadina romagnola	Single-layered, unleavened; sometimes leavened (sodium bicarbonate)	Wheat flour (refined), olive oil, pork fat (strutto); historically made with cornmeal	4–8 mm (0.2–0.3 in) (Note: A variant of piadina romagnola from Rimini has a thickness of 3 mm (0.1 in) and a diameter of 28–30 cm (11–12 in).)	15–25 cm (5.9–9.8 in)	—	Griddle (testo)	Europe (Emilia-Romagna)	
Pide / İçli pide	—	Topped with meat, cheese, eggs, or spinach	—	—	Oval, thin	—	West Asia (Turkey)	
Pide / Ramazan pidesi	Single-layered, leavened (yeast)	Wheat flour, shortening, sugar	1.5–2 cm (0.6–0.8 in)	20–25 cm (7.9–9.8 in)	Round	Oven	West Asia (Turkey)	
Pistoccu	Double-layered, leavened (yeast)	Semolina	3–4 mm (0.1–0.2 in)	—	Crisp, sliced to separate layers	Steam oven (twice-baked); historically wood-fired oven	Europe (Sardinia)	
Pita (Note: Also called Arabic bread or Lebanese bread)	Double-layered, leavened (yeast)	Wheat flour	1.5–10 mm (0.1–0.4 in)	15 cm (5.9 in)	Round with pocket	Oven	Worldwide (including Greece, Turkey, Middle East, North Africa)	
Pitta	Single-layered, leavened	—	—	—	—	—	Europe (Calabria, Sicily, Apulia)	
Pizza	Single-layered, leavened (yeast/chemical)	Wheat flour, sugar, shortening; topped with tomato sauce, cheese, and other ingredients	Varies	About 25 cm (9.8 in)	Wide range of styles, see list of pizzas	Oven	Worldwide (Originally Italy)	
Planc	—	—	—	—	—	—	Europe (Wales)	
Puccia	Double-layered, leavened (sourdough)	Semolina (or barley flour), olive oil	—	20 cm (8 in)	Round	Stone	Europe (Apulia)	
Pupusa	Stuffed	Maize flour; filled with beans, cheese, squash, chicharrones, or other ingredients	—	—	Similar dough to tortilla	Griddle	Americas (El Salvador, Guatemala, Honduras)	
Puran poli	Stuffed, unleavened	Wheat flour; filled with jaggery and Bengal gram	2 mm (0.1 in)	15 cm (5.9 in)	Round, sweet	Griddle	South Asia (Maharashtra)	
Puri	Single-layered, unleavened	Wheat flour (atta or maida), sometimes additional flours, sometimes shortening; sometimes stuffed	1.5–2 mm (0.1–0.1 in)	10–15 cm (3.9–5.9 in)	Puffy, gold-colored	Deep-fried	South Asia (India, Pakistan, Bangladesh)	
Roomali roti	Single-layered, unleavened	Wheat flour	1–1.5 mm (0.0–0.1 in)	30 cm (11.8 in)	Large, very thin, tender	Griddle (on convex side)	South Asia (North India, Central India)	
Roti canai / Roti prata	Unleavened	—	—	—	Thin, layered; similar to parotta	Fried	Southeast Asia (Malaysia, Singapore)	
Rotla	—	Millet or sorghum flour	—	—	—	Griddle (sautéed)	South Asia (Gujarat)	
Rye flatbread	Varies	Rye flour	5–10 mm (0.2–0.4 in)	5 cm (2.0 in)	Round (sometimes with hole), crisp, wide range of styles	—	Europe (Scandinavia, Finland)	
Salouf	—	—	—	—	Oblong	Grill	West Asia (originally Yemen; also Israel)	
Samoli	Single-layered, leavened (yeast)	Wheat flour, sugar, shortening	—	19 cm (7.5 in) by 15 cm (5.9 in)	Resembles a loaf	—	West Asia (Arabian Peninsula)	
Samoon	Double-layered, leavened	—	—	—	—	—	West Asia (Iraq)	
Sanchuisanda	—	—	—	—	—	Embers	East Asia (China)	
Sangak	Single-layered, leavened (sourdough)	Wheat flour; topped with sesame or poppy seeds	3–5 mm (0.1–0.2 in)	70–80 cm (28–31 in) by 40–50 cm (16–20 in)	Blistered	Oven with heated pebbles	West Asia (Iran)	
Schiacciata	Single-layered, leavened (yeast)	Wheat flour, olive oil (or strutto)	—	—	—	Griddle (testo) covered in embers	Europe (Tuscany and Lombardy)	
Schüttelbrot	Single-layered, leavened (sourdough)	Rye and wheat flour, spices such as fennel	data-sort-value=0.3 | 3–15 mm (0.1–0.6 in)	10–35 cm (4–14 in)	Round, dry, sour, with irregular holes	—	Europe (South Tyrol)	
Shamsi	Single-layered, leavened (sourdough)	—	—	20 cm (7.9 in)	Round or square	Oven; exposed to sunlight before baking	North Africa (Egypt)	
Shaobing	Leavened (sourdough or yeast)	Topped with sesame seeds	—	—	Round, thick, hand-sized; various styles	Baked	East Asia (China)	
Sheermal	Single-layered, leavened	Wheat flour, milk, sugar; sometimes saffron and cardamom	3–4 mm (0.1–0.2 in)	15 cm (5.9 in)	Round, sweet	Tandoor	South Asia (Kashmir)	
Shoti	—	—	—	—	—	Tandoor	West Asia (Georgia)	
Shrak	Unleavened	Wheat flour (whole)	—	—	Large	Griddle	West Asia (Middle East, including Bedouin tribes)	
Shuraik	—	—	—	—	Soft, gold-colored	—	West Asia (Arabian Peninsula)	
Spianata	Double-layered, leavened (sourdough)	Semolina	1 cm (0.4 in)	20–30 cm (8–12 in)	Round, crusty	Wood-fired oven	Europe (Sardinia)	
Tachnift	Single-layered, leavened	—	—	—	—	—	North Africa Morocco	
Tafarnout	Double-layered, leavened	—	—	—	—	Oven with heated pebbles	North Africa (Berber)	
Taftoon (Note: Also called tanoor bread)	Single-layered, unleavened	Wheat flour	2 mm (0.1 in)	40–50 cm (16–20 in) by 40–50 cm (16–20 in)	Round or oval, red-brown, docked	—	West Asia (Iran)	
Tamees	Single-layered, leavened (yeast)	Wheat flour, sugar, shortening	—	35 cm (14 in)	Round, thick, golden-brown with brown spots	Oven	West Asia (Saudi Arabia)	
Tandoor bread	Varies (sourdough or yeast)	Wheat flour, sodium bicarbonate; sometimes mixed with ground meat	—	—	Wide range of styles (including taftoon and tandoori roti)	Tandoor	West and South Asia (Middle East, Indian subcontinent, Afghanistan)	
Tandoori roti	Single-layered, unleavened	Wheat flour	3–8 mm (0.1–0.3 in)	15–20 cm (5.9–7.9 in)	Puffy	Tandoor	South Asia (North India)	
Tannouri	Leavened (sourdough or yeast)	Wheat flour	—	24–35 cm (9.4–13.8 in)	Round	Tandoor	West Asia (Saudi Arabia, Jordan, Iraq, Afghanistan)	
Tanok	—	—	0.1–3.5 cm (0.0–1.4 in)	30–40 cm (11.8–15.7 in)	Round (usually)	Vertical oven	West Asia (Iran, Afghanistan)	
Terabelesi	Leavened (yeast)	Wheat flour (refined)	2 cm (0.8 in)	20 cm (7.9 in)	Round, docked with square cuts	Oven	North Africa (Tunisia)	
Thepla	Single-layered, unleavened	Wheat flour, gram flour, fenugreek leaf	1–2 mm (0.0–0.1 in)	15 cm (5.9 in)	Round, thin	Griddle	South Asia (Gujarat)	
Torta al testo	Single-layered, leavened (sodium bicarbonate)	Wheat flour, fat (lard or olive oil)	—	—	Docked using a fork	Griddle (testo) in embers	Europe (Umbria)	
Tortilla, maize	Single-layered, unleavened	Maize flour (nixtamalized)	2–3 mm (0.1–0.1 in)	15 to 20 cm (5.9 to 7.9 in)	Round, thin, dense, chewy, light-colored	—	Americas (including Mexico, Guatemala)	
Tortilla, wheat	Single-layered, unleavened	Wheat flour, shortening (lard)	3–4.8 cm (1.2–1.9 in)	18–25 cm (7.1–9.8 in)	Round, bubbly with brown spots	Griddle	Worldwide; Originally Americas (Mexico, United States)	
Tunnbröd	Single-layered, leavened (yeast or chemical agent)	Wheat and/or rye and/or barley flour	—	—	Rectangular, thin	—	Europe (Sweden)	
Wrap	Single-layered, leavened (yeast)	Wheat flour, improving agents	—	25–30 cm (9.8–11.8 in)	Round, large, thin	Oven	Worldwide	
Yufka	Single-layered, unleavened	Wheat flour, acid (vinegar or lemon), olive oil	1–2 mm (0.0–0.1 in)	40–80 cm (16–31 in)	Round, cream-colored, crisp	Griddle	West Asia (Turkey)	
Zichi	Double-layered, leavened (sourdough)	Semolina	5 mm (0.2 in)	35–40 cm (14–16 in)	Stamped; sometimes dried	Wood-fired oven	Europe (Sardinia)	

== See also ==
- List of breads
  - List of bread rolls
  - List of quick breads
- List of crackers
- List of baked goods
