= Crescentina =

Crescentina may refer to:

- Crescentina modenese, also known as crescenta or tigella, a round bread from the Modena area of Emilia-Romagna, Italy
- Gnocco fritto, also called crescentina, a bread from the Emilia-Romagna region of Italy
