= Bazlama =

Leavened flatbread from Turkey

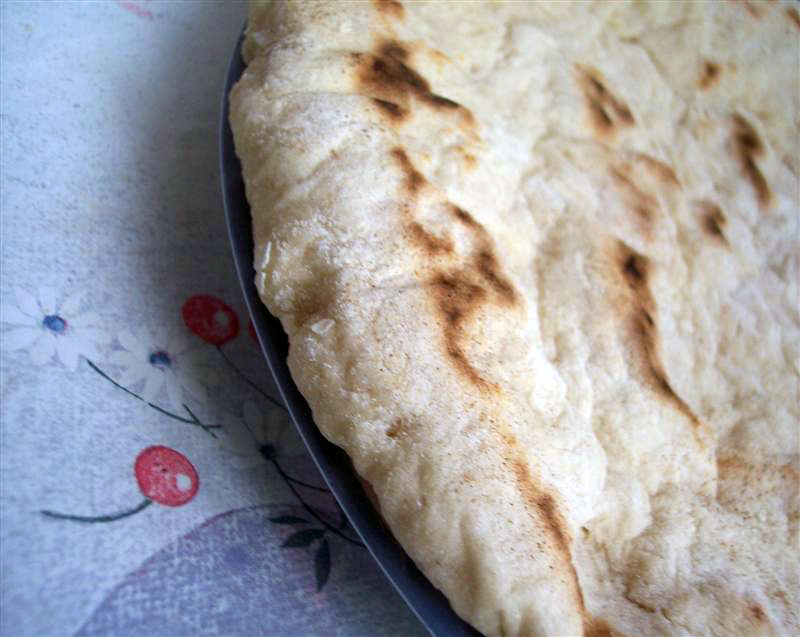
- Type: Flatbread
- Place of origin: Turkey
- Main ingredients: Wheat flour, water, salt, yeast, yogurt

Bazlama is a leavened, circular flatbread from Turkish cuisine with a soft, fluffy texture and slightly crisp exterior. It is made from wheat flour and yogurt (adding a slight tanginess) and has an average thickness of 2 cm and diameters ranging from 10 to 25 cm. After mixing and fermenting for two to three hours, a 200-250 gram piece of dough is made into balls, then rolled out flat and baked on a hot stove. During baking, the bread is turned over and fried on both sides. After baking, it is generally consumed fresh and is often served as part of a traditional Turkish breakfast. Bazlama is sometimes referred to as "village bread" due to its popularity in rural areas of Turkey. Shelf life of bazlama varies from several hours to a few days, depending on storage conditions.

== See also ==
- List of flatbreads
