= Sajji =

Meat dish from Pakistan

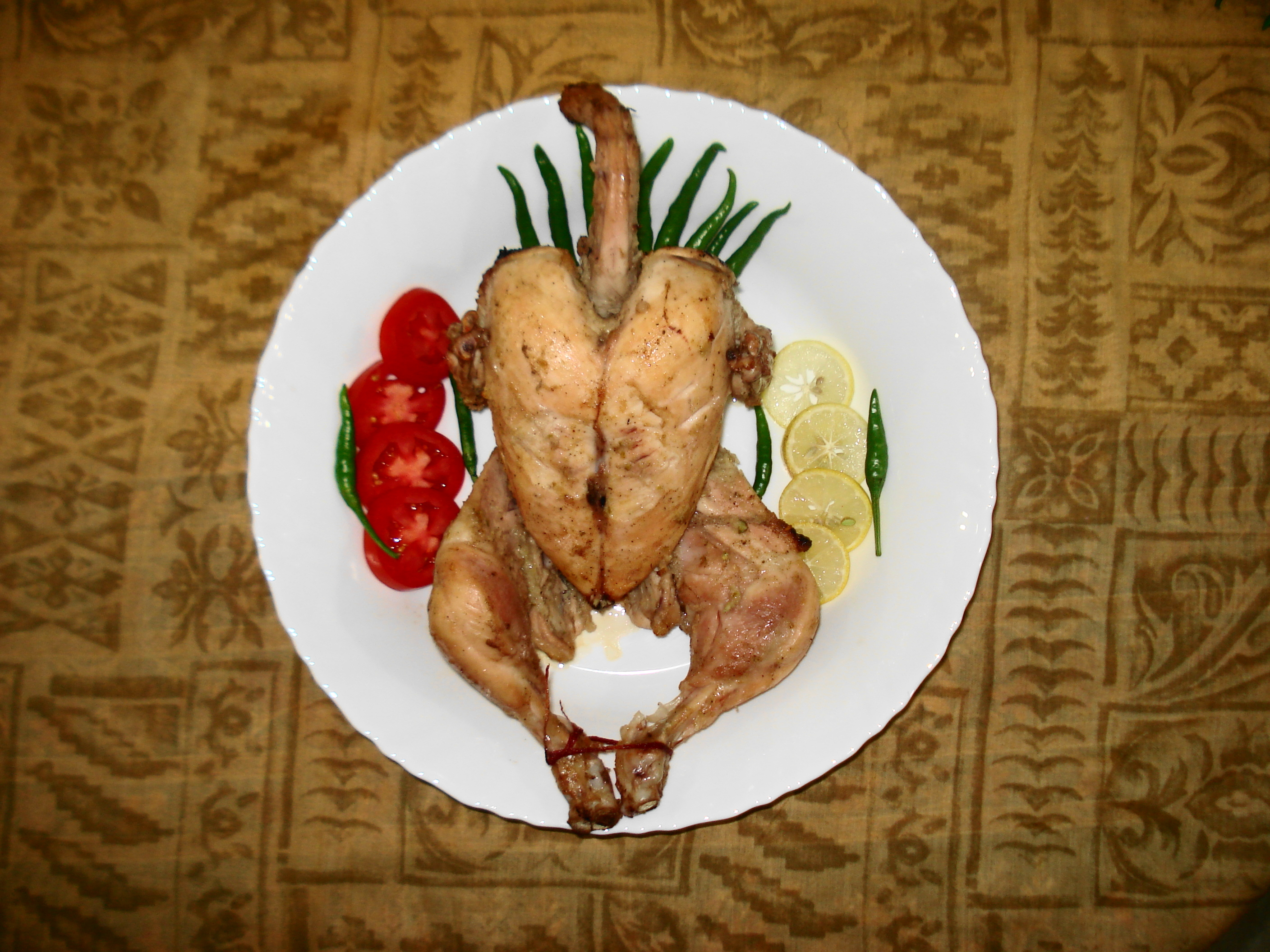
- Place of origin: Pakistan
- Region or state: Southern Punjab

Sajji (Urdu: سجی) is a meat dish from Pakistan, today popular amongst the South Asian diaspora. Its origin lies with the Baloch people, specifically the Lehri tribe of southern Punjab. The traditional sajji consists of lamb, marinated only in salt with a few spices. It is considered done when it is at the rare stage. It is served with rice that is cooked inside the animal, which is baked in an oven and wrapped around a stone tandoor.

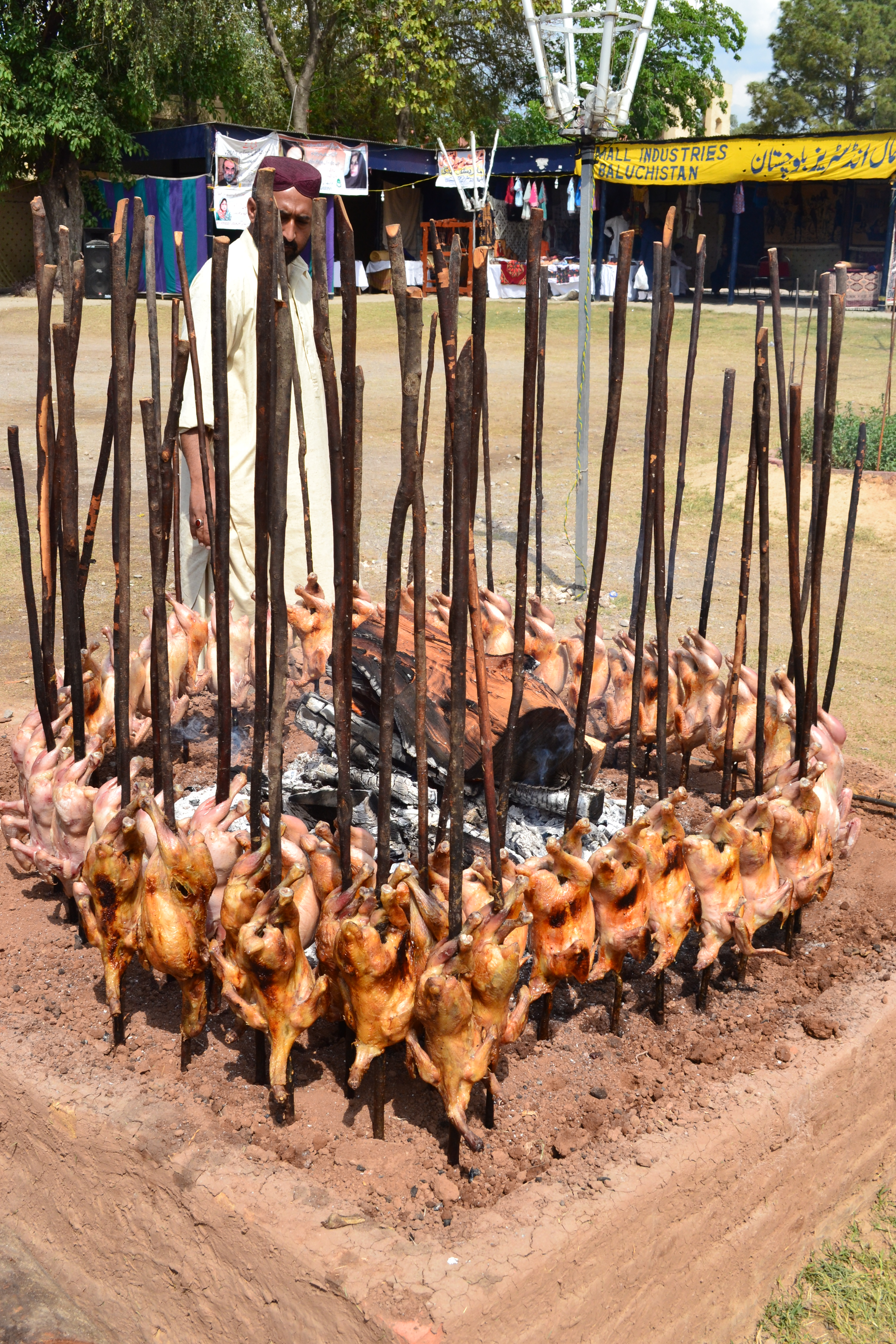
Sajji being cooked in Balochistan, Pakistan

Regional varieties are found with subtle differences in flavouring. Notably, in the urban centres of Karachi, Islamabad, or Lahore, chicken is used instead of lamb, the sajji is roasted until it is medium or well-done and is served with rice instead of Balochistan's traditional kaak bread.

== See also ==
- Baloch cuisine
- Tabaheg
- List of chicken dishes
- List of lamb dishes
- List of stuffed dishes
