= Tabaheg =

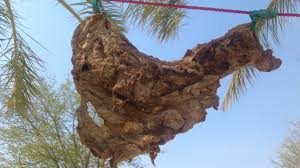
Tabaheg

Tabaheg (Balochi: تباهگ) is a traditional Balochi food in which the meat is salted and dried with sour pomegranate and salt. Tabaheg is cooked with rice. Tabaheg is one of the most famous foods of Balochistan region.

It is made through the meat of sheep or goat yet there is little difference in the making process.

Tabaheg is served with thin layers of meat and rubbing the mixed dough of sour pomegranate powder and salt and lemon juice on these thin layers of meat, then they are hung outdoors on a rope, exposed to sunlight, and in a way that they can absorb enough light and air, covering with a special cloth to protect from the dust and contamination.

== See also ==
- Balochi cuisine
- Sajji
