= Balochi cuisine =

Culinary traditions of the Baloch people

Baloch cuisine
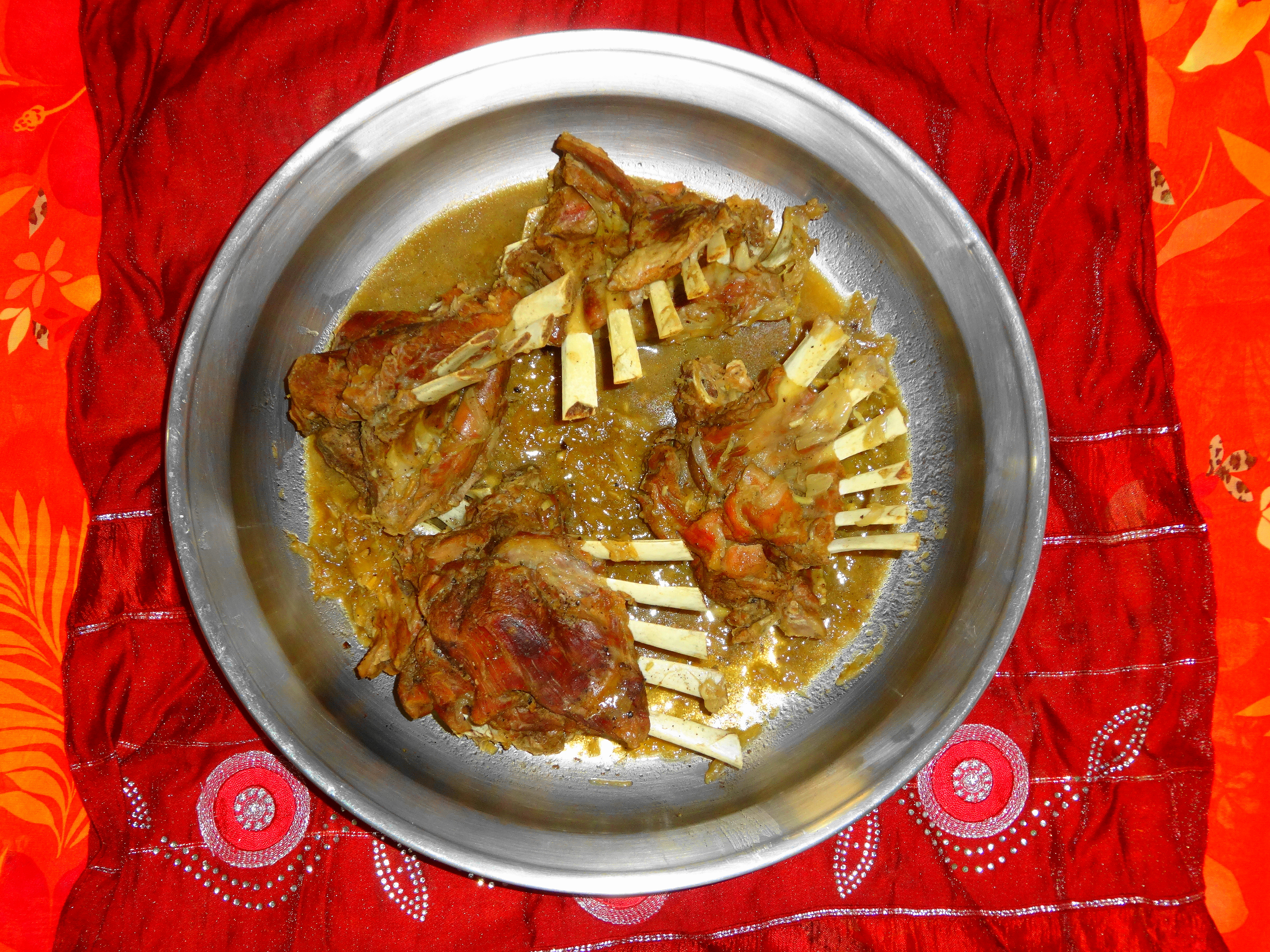
- Baloch namkeen roast
- Country or region: Balochistan

Balochi cuisine (Balochi: بلۏچی ورگ, romanized: Balòči warag) is the food and cuisine of the Baloch people native to the Balochistan region spanning Afghanistan, Iran, and Pakistan, as well as diaspora communities worldwide. Baloch food has a regional variance in contrast to the many cuisines of Pakistan and Iran. (Note: Baloch food is heavily inspired by climate and terrain)

== Meat ==
Meat (گوشت) is the most commonly consumed food in Baloch cuisine. Most meat dishes are cooked on indirect heat with limited spices to preserve the real taste, such as sajji and dampukht. Another traditional dish that is preserved from generations is known as tabaheg—a dish of an entire goat marinated with dried pomegranate and salt.

== Fish ==
Fish is commonly consumed in the coastal region of Balochistan. The most common is mayg o bhat (ماہیگ ءُ بھٹ; "fish and rice").

== Bread ==
There are many kinds of bread in Balochi cuisine, depending on region. A notable bread, known as kaak or kurnoo, is made of wheat wrapped around a hot round stone and cooked around a fire in a hardened ball of bread that can last for days.

== Dessert ==
Just like breads, desserts range from area or tribe. A notable and very popular dessert is gwadari halwa, which is cooked in a round, aged metal pot.

== See also ==
- Outline of cooking
- List of cuisines
  - Afghan cuisine
  - Emirati cuisine
  - Iranian cuisine
  - Turkish cuisine
  - Kuwaiti cuisine
  - Omani cuisine
  - Pakistani cuisine
  - Turkmen cuisine
