= Crescentina modenese =

Type of Italian bread

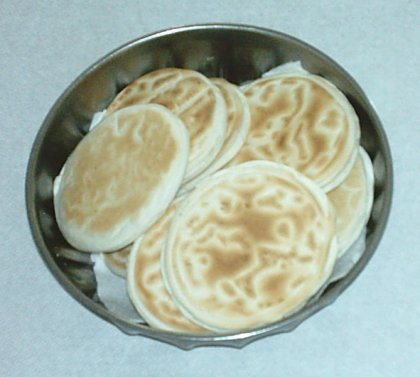
- A dish of crescentine
- Alternative names: Crescenta, tigella
- Type: Bread
- Place of origin: Italy

Crescentine (sg.: crescentina), crescente (sg.: crescenta) or tigelle (sg. tigella) are thin, 10 centimetres (3.9 in) round breads from the Apennine Mountains in the Modena area of Emilia-Romagna, Italy. They are made with flour, water, salt, and yeast, and traditionally eaten filled with cunza, a spread made from pork lard and flavoured with garlic and rosemary or with cold cuts, boar, rabbit, cheese, salty dressings or sweet spreads. In the Apennines, crescente have long been eaten at home or enjoyed in traditional restaurants, but in the last decade some fast food and casual restaurants have added crescente to their menus. Similar breads such as piadina, borlengo, gnocco fritto, and panigaccio are made in neighbouring areas.

Originally, crescente were baked between tiles called tigelle, a term derived from a Latin word for 'cover'. Later, the name tigella came to be used for the bread itself. Nowadays, crescente are baked in restaurants using electric griddles, while at home a special aluminium pan called a tigelliera or cottola over a gas cooker is used.

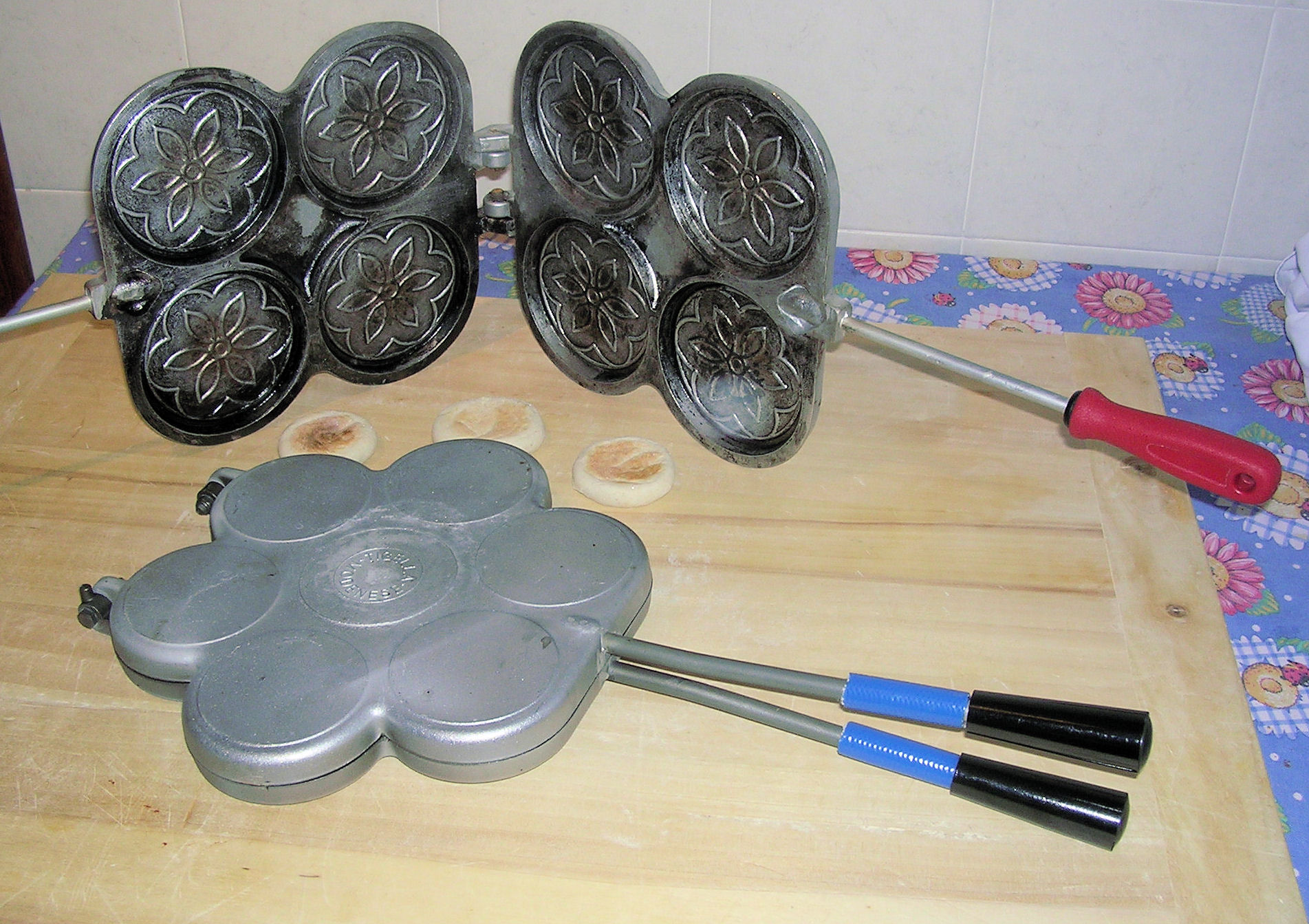
Tigelliera

Crescentine is a prodotto agroalimentare tradizionale (PAT).

== See also ==
Media related to Crescentina modenese at Wikimedia Commons
