= Matloue =

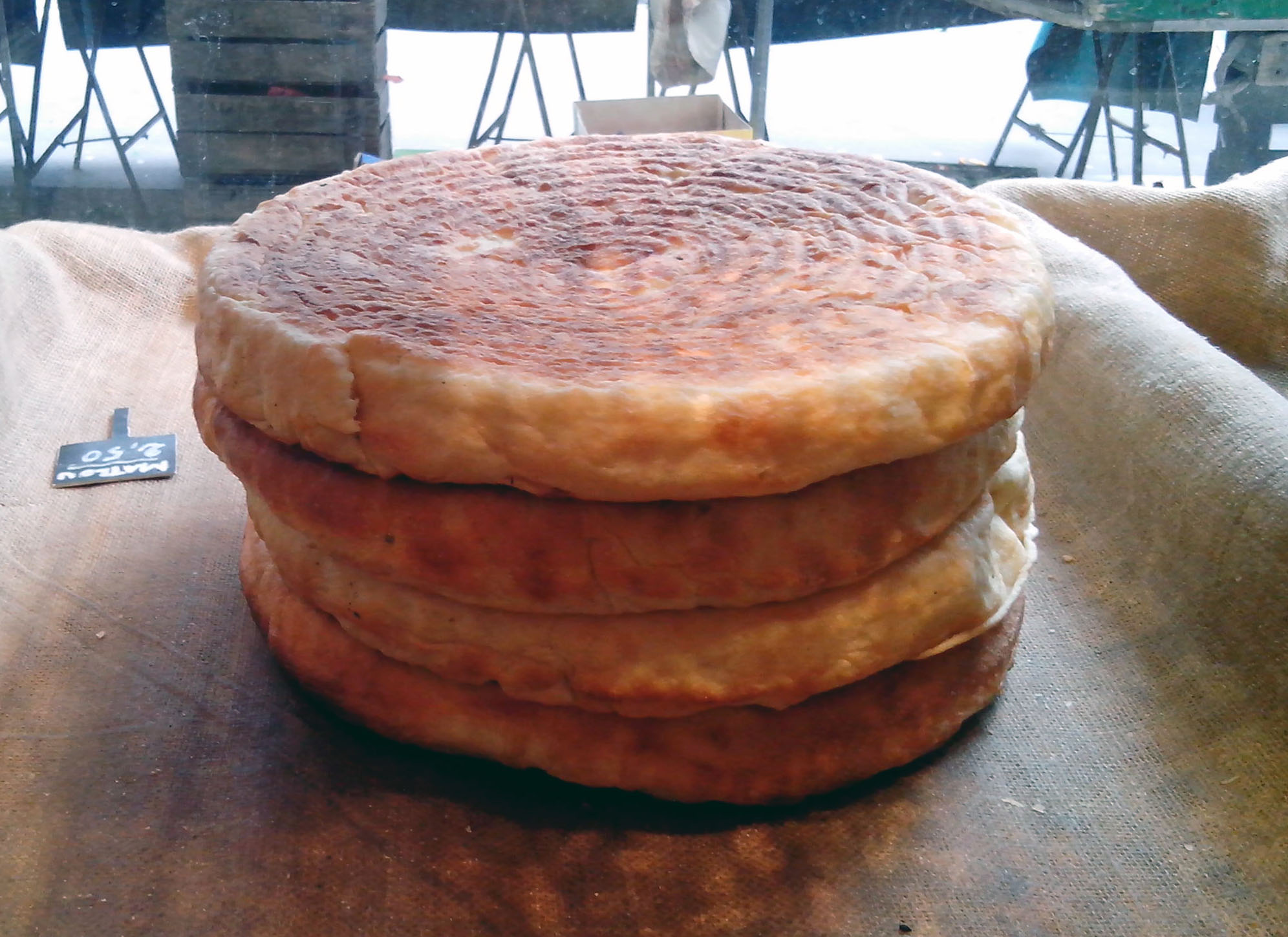
- Alternative names: khobz e-tadjine
- Place of origin: Algeria

Matloue, matlou’ (arabic : المطلوع), Also named khobz e-tadjine and khobz e-matlou, is a type of Algerian sourdough bread. It is made of semolina (durum wheat or barley) and a natural leaven called ghessen (n) temtount. It is cooked on a clay or cast iron tagine.

The bread is a staple on family tables, particularly during Ramadan.
