= Pig fat =

Pig fat may refer to:

- Lard, usually visceral "soft fat", usually rendered
- Fatback, "hard fat" under the skin of the back, usually cured or fried
- Salo (food), cured slabs of pig fat popular in Eastern Europe
