= Borlengo =

Italian thin flatbread

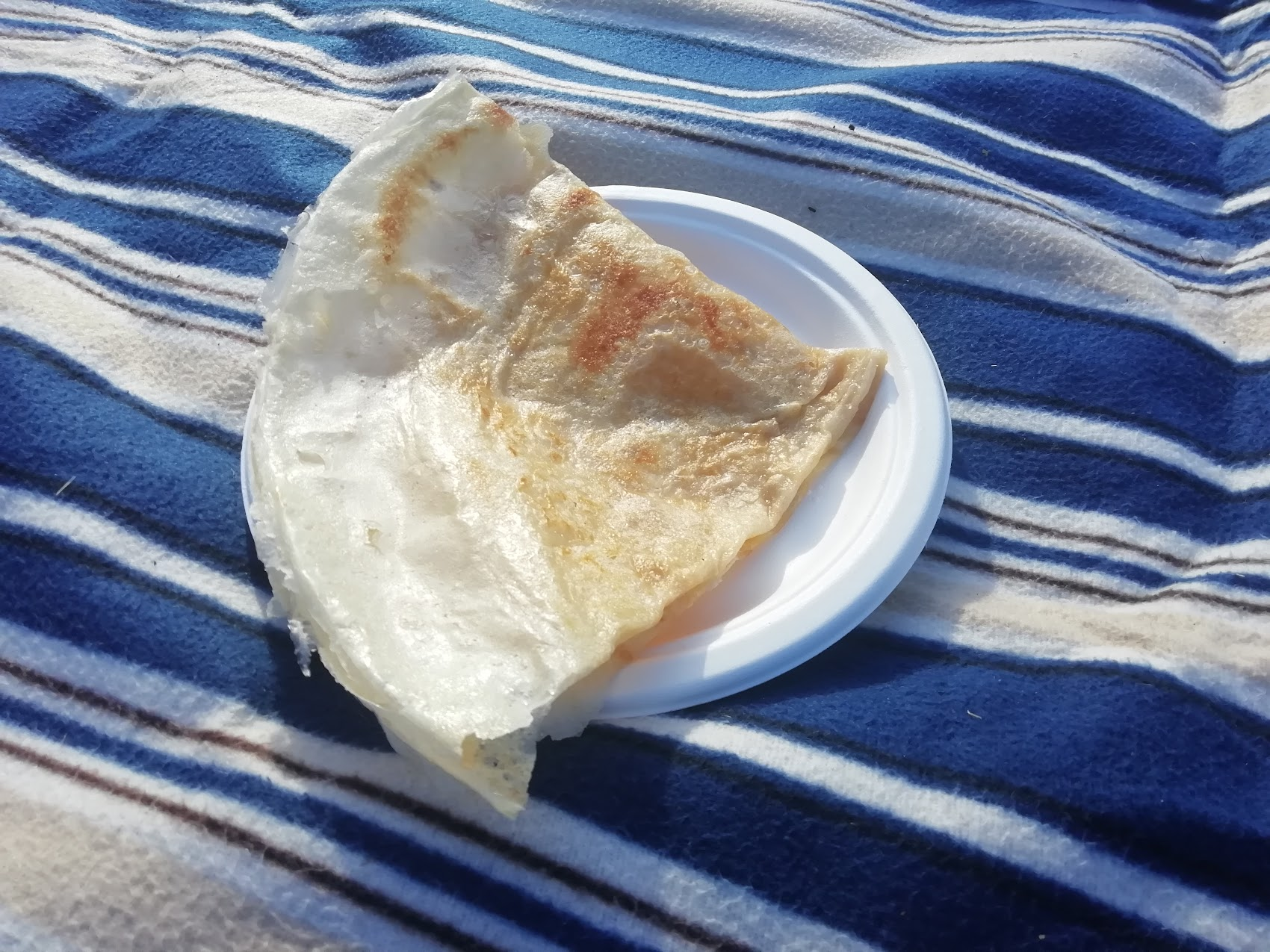
- Alternative names: Burlengo, zampanelle
- Place of origin: Italy
- Region or state: Emilia
- Main ingredients: Water, eggs, flour

Borlengo (pl.: borlenghi), also called burlengo or zampanelle, is an Italian thin flatbread. Originally a type of food eaten by the poor and made only with flour and water, it now also usually includes salt and optionally eggs, and is often made outside in a frying pan the size of a cart's wheel. These are then rubbed with a mixture that can contain rosemary, garlic, salt pork, olive oil, or what is called cunza, sauteed minced pancetta and sausage, folded into quarters and sprinkled with Parmesan.

== See also ==
Media related to Borlengo at Wikimedia Commons
