= Turkmen cuisine =

Culinary traditions of Turkmenistan

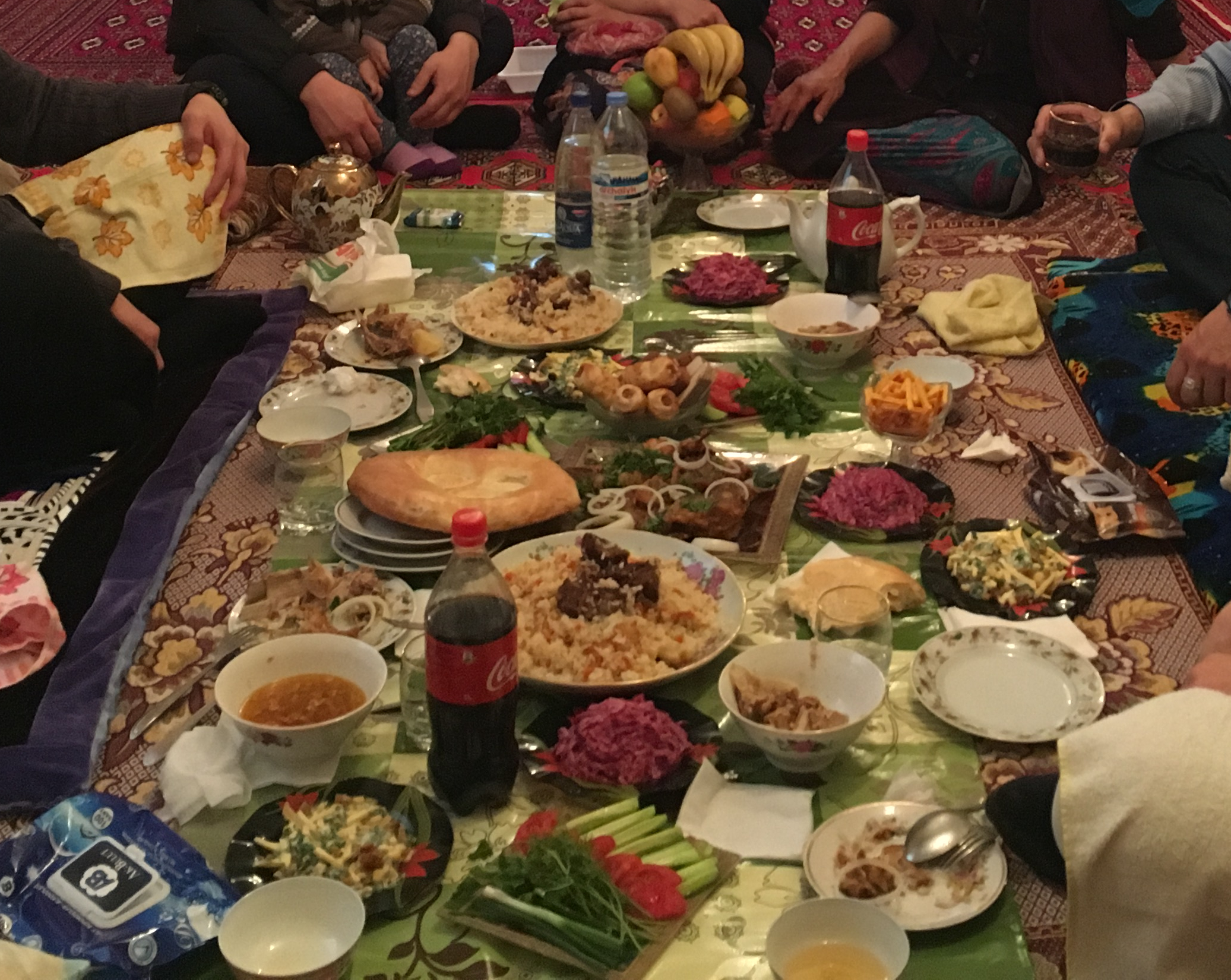
A festive Turkmen luncheon laid out on a sachak (Turkmen tablecloth placed on the floor)

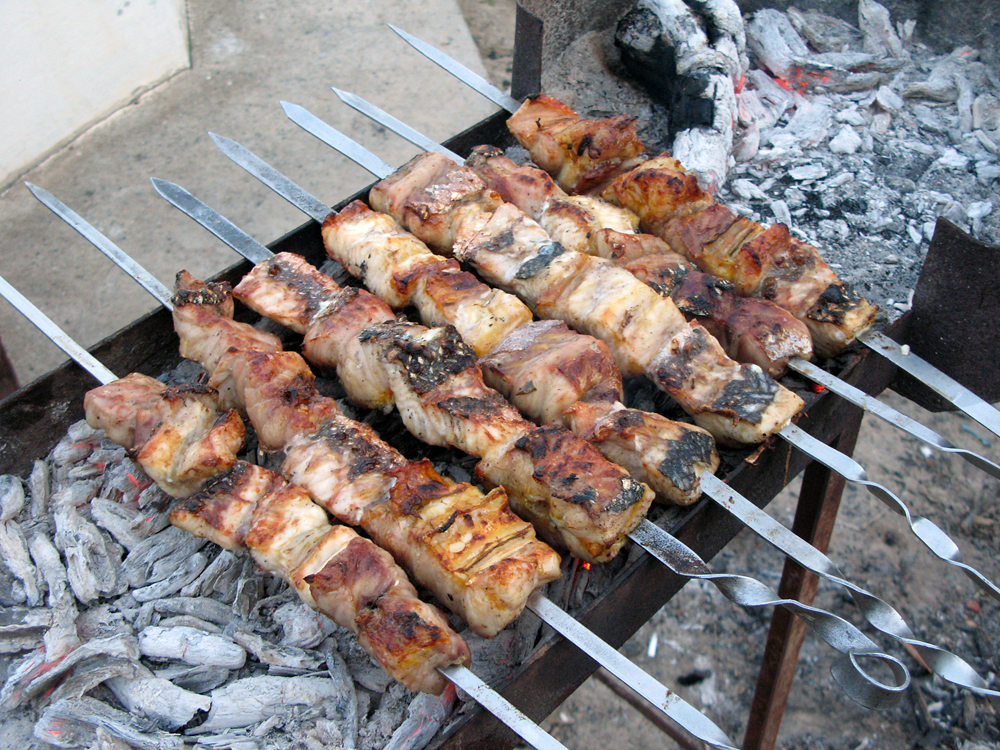
Sturgeon kebabs

Turkmen cuisine, the cuisine of Turkmenistan, is similar to that of the rest of Central Asia. Turkmen seminomadic culture revolved around animal husbandry, especially sheep herding, and accordingly Turkmen cuisine is noted for its focus on meat, particularly mutton and lamb. One source notes,

The nomadic past has left a very noticeable trace in Turkmen cuisine - the basis of the diet is meat: lamb, meat of gazelles, non-working camels, wild fowl, chicken. Beef is consumed much less frequently because this food appeared on the table much later, Turkmens don't eat horse meat at all.

Turkmen cuisine does not generally use spices or seasonings other than salt and black pepper, and is typically cooked with large amounts of widely available cottonseed oil.

A description of Turkmen foods presented at an annual culinary festival included "... more than 15 kinds of soup, meat and fish delicacies, ruddy ichlekli (meat pies), appetizing gutaps with different fillings (pumpkin, spinach), crumbly pilaf, kelle bash ayak and chekdirme, whole roasted lamb, kakmach, hearty yarma, numerous salads, traditional pishme, as well as sweets..." At a formal ribbon-cutting ceremony for new housing, the offerings included "...all kinds of meat, poultry and fish dishes, cereals, vegetables and gourds, soups, culinary products made of dough, dairy products and drinks prepared according to ancient recipes. These include tamdyrlama, ichlekli, yarma, dograma, different kinds of pilaf, çorba, somsa, pishme, süzme, çal, agaran and much else."

== Meat ==
Shashlyk (Turkmen: çişlik), skewered chunks of mutton, lamb, chicken, or sometimes fish, grilled over charcoal and garnished with raw sliced onion and a special vinegar-based sauce, is served in restaurants and often sold in the street. Shashlyk from pork and beef was introduced during the Russian Imperial period, and is easily found in major cities. Kebabs of ground meat are commonly prepared from beef and occasionally camel. Kakmach (Turkmen: kakmaç) is preserved, dried meat prepared in individual portions or strips. Kakmach may be fried in fat or baked in a tandoor, but it is traditionally dried like jerky in the hot desert sun.

Gowurma is deep-fat-fried meat in bite-sized chunks, typically cooked in a cauldron (Turkmen: gazan, a large hemispherical iron pot placed over an open fire). Gowurma is used in various soups and can be eaten hot or cold, or put up for later use.

== Dumplings ==
A wide variety of filled pies and dumplings are available in restaurants and bazaars. Manty are steamed dumplings filled with ground meat, onions or pumpkin. Typical fried dishes include somsa, gutap (often filled with spinach), fitchi (fitçi), börek, and ichlekli (içlekli). These are popular with travelers and taxi drivers, as they can be eaten quickly on the run, and are often sold at roadside stands.

== Fruit ==
=== Melons ===
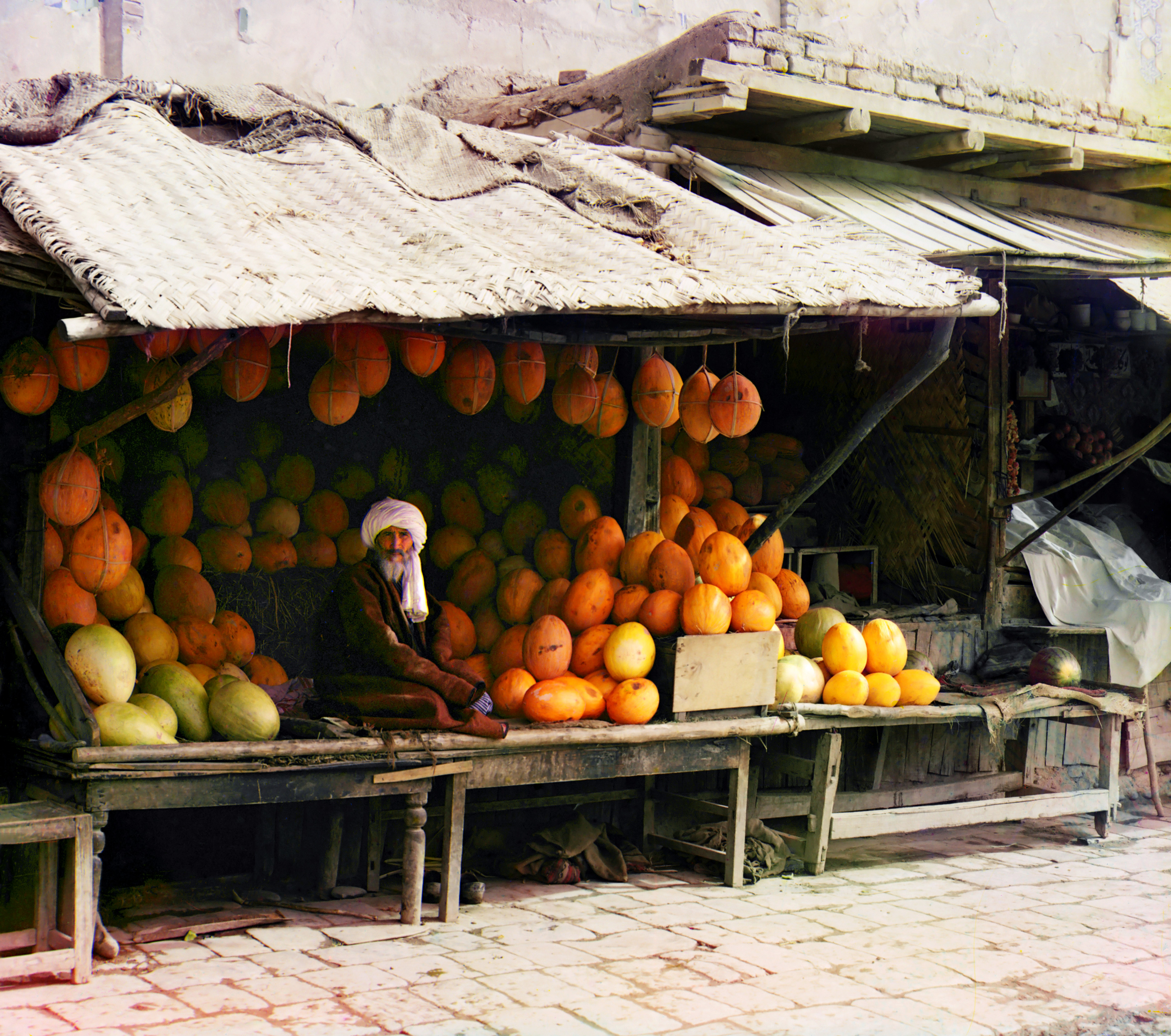
Melon vendor from Samarkand, Russian Turkestan (present-day Uzbekistan); picture taken around 1905 to 1915

In the culinary arena, Turkmenistan is perhaps known best for its melons (Turkmen: gawun), especially in the former Soviet Union, where it was once the major supplier. Turkmen state-controlled media have referred to the melon as the "tsarina of the garden" (Russian: царица бахчи). Though very few melons are exported today, they are a great source of national pride in Turkmenistan and subject of their own Melon Day holiday. Turkmen sources claim the country is home to up to 400 distinct varieties.

=== Pomegranate ===
Residents of oases use pomegranate (Turkmen: nar) as a flavoring, often crushing the seeds for juice to be added to dishes.

=== Pumpkin ===
Pumpkins (Turkmen: kädi) are mainly used as a soup flavoring but, hollowed out, may be used as a vessel for baking casseroles or meats. Pumpkin seeds are crushed for cooking oil.

=== Tomato ===
Although a foreign import from the New World, tomatoes have become a major influence on Turkmen cuisine in the last two centuries. Tomatoes are pickled, dried, pureed, and chopped for adding to dishes, and made into tomato soup and juice.

== Cereal-based dishes ==
=== Breads ===
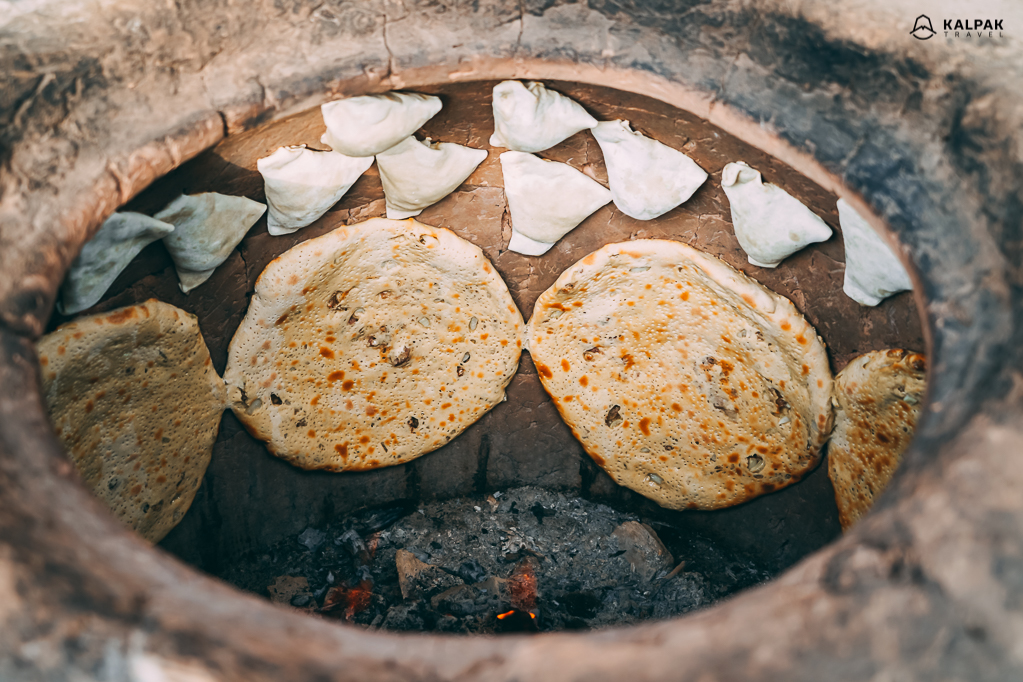
Turkmen bread baking in tandyr

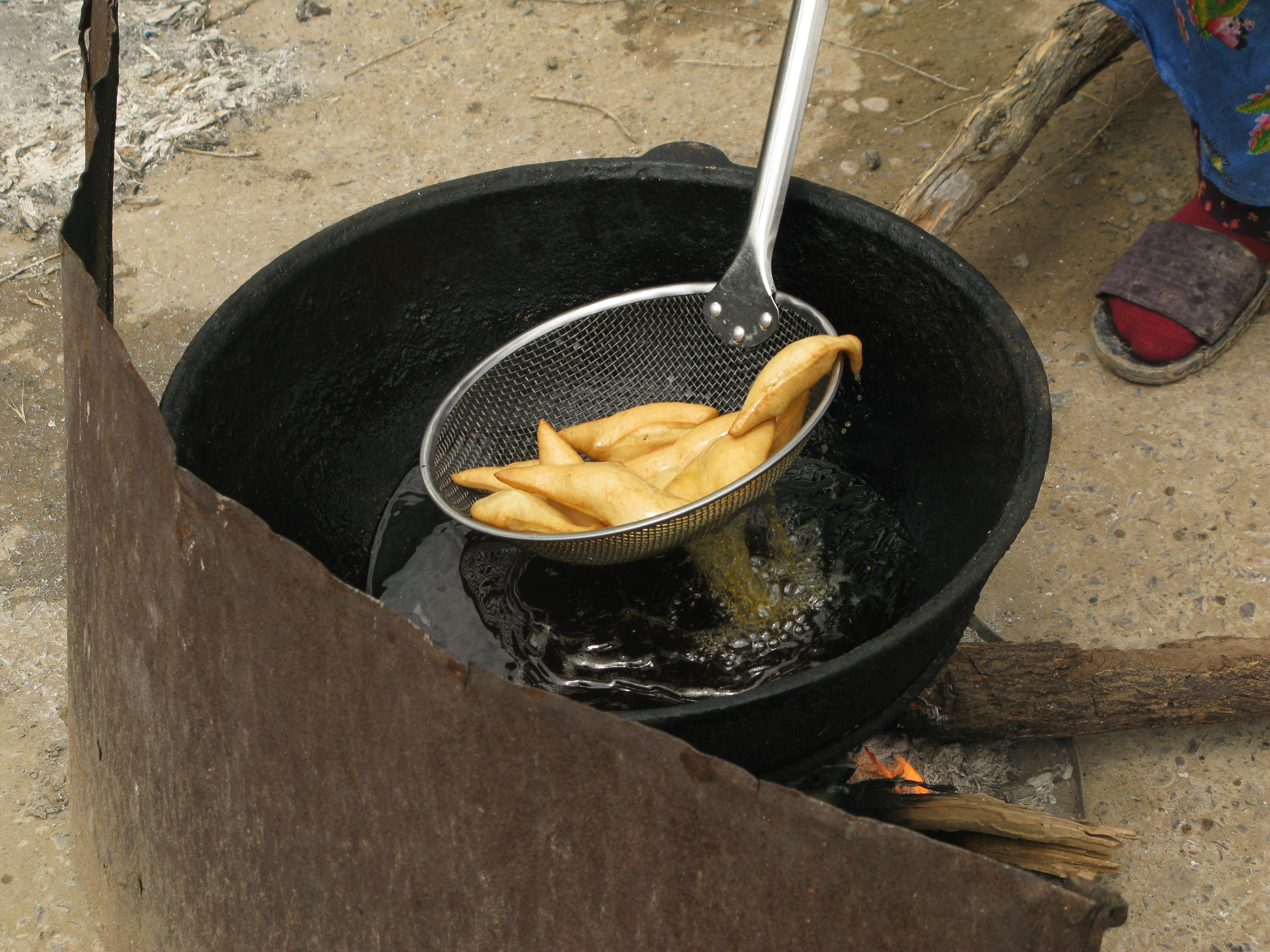
Pishme

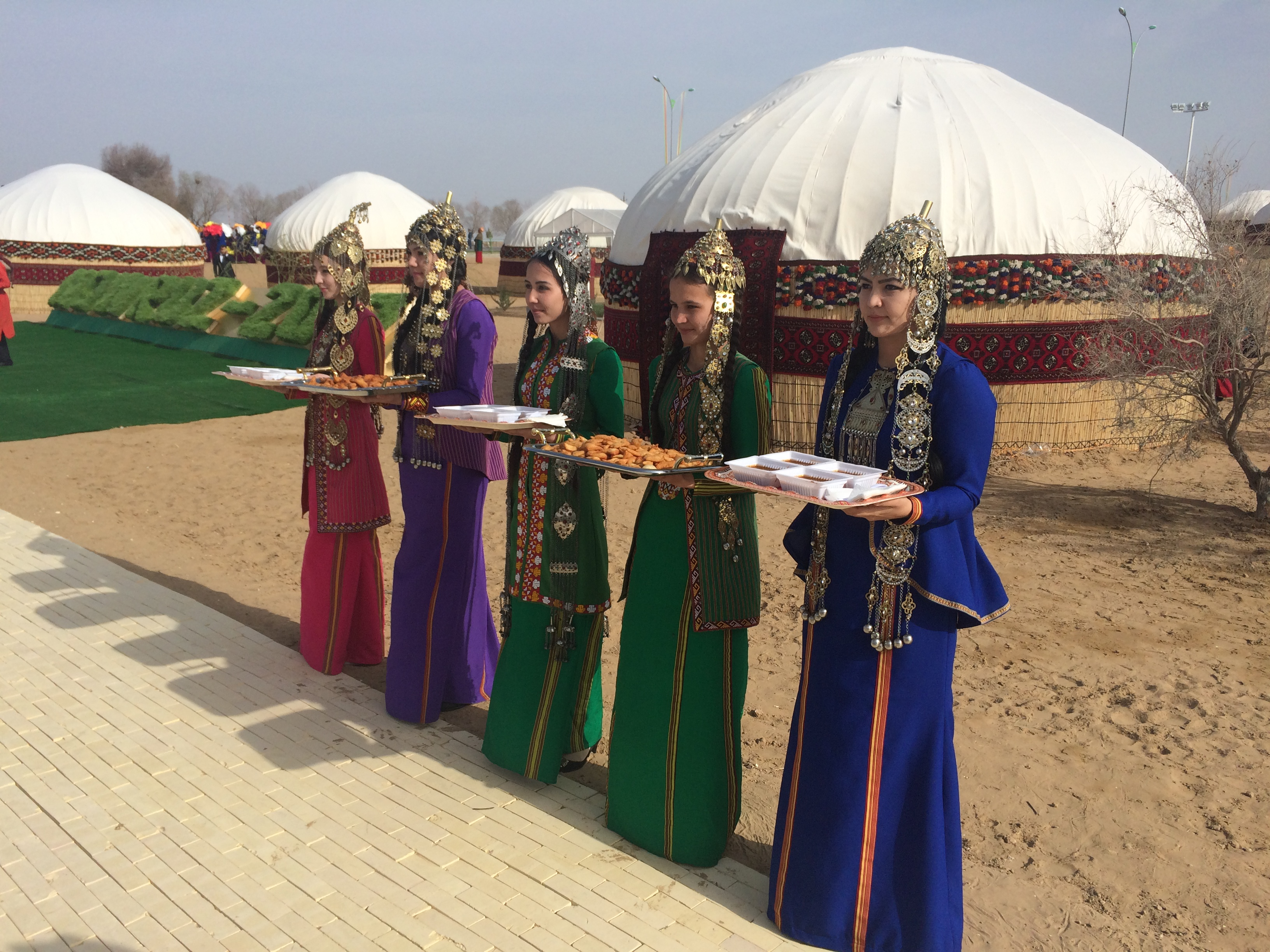
Turkmen girls at a Novruz festival greet guests with pishme and dried fruits.

Meals are almost always served with naan, Central Asian flatbread, known locally as çörek. Turkmen bread is prepared differently from other breads in the region in thick, round disc-shaped loaves baked in a traditional tamdyr clay oven. Bread baked with meat inside (etli çörek, or "meat bread") can be consumed as a meal in itself. Ýagly çörek (literally 'oily bread' or 'buttery bread') is a flaky, layered type of flatbread made with butter. Pishme (Turkmen: pişme) are soft, bite-sized, sweetened, fried breads traditionally presented to arriving guests as a welcoming gesture.

Bread bears highly symbolic importance in Turkmen culture. It is considered highly impolite to turn a loaf of bread upside down or to mistreat bread in any way. There are many superstitions surrounding bread and its preparation. In the words of Turkmen state-controlled media,

...the main role in the hospitality of the peoples of Central Asia is played by bread - çörek, which also serves as a symbol of hospitality, brotherhood, honor, hard work, prosperity, gratitude and the kindest wishes. Bread is baked in many kinds...ancient recipes have many modern variations, but the matter is not even in the ingredients themselves, which determine the softness, puffiness and taste of dough, but in the special ritual of its preparation, especially for festive meals...

The student of Turkmen culture Sergey Demidov wrote,

And yet, despite the high authority of the horse, there was something even higher and more sacred in the Turkmen household, bearing the stamp of taboo from ancient times. This was the tamdyr, the oven for baking çörek - a symbol of life, well-being and family hearth, supported by the sanctity of bread and, perhaps, by echoes of Zoroastrian-Mazdean beliefs associated with fire. Therefore, in the scale of ethical values there might have been a judgment such as: "It is better to slit a horse's throat or rob someone than to destroy a tamdyr".

=== Pilaf ===
Pilaf (Turkmen: palaw) is served at celebrations and to honored guests; one source calls it "king in Turkmen cuisine." It consists of rice typically cooked with chunks of mutton and carrots, onions, and garlic, prepared in a large cast-iron cauldron. Different pilaf recipes may call for addition of raisins (Turkmen: kişmiş), fruits, fish, and ground meat. Pilaf is traditionally eaten with the hands.

=== Porridges ===
Yarma (Turkmen: ýarma, from the Turkmen word ýarym "half, split") is cracked wheat cooked in sheep fat with very small pieces of mutton mixed in for flavor. The dish is claimed to have existed for at least one thousand years. Shule (Turkmen: şüle) is a watery rice porridge with meat, sometimes served with shredded carrots. Sorghum porridge (Turkmen: etli köje) is a traditional dish for the Novruz festival; the dish is ancient, for sorghum was introduced to the Turkmen by trade on the Silk Road.

== Soups ==
Shurpa (Turkmen: şurpa), meat boullion, is the base of most soups. The most traditional Turkmen soups are various types of unash (Turkmen: unaş), made with milk and noodles or with beans and noodles. Other common soups include dograma (also dogramaly şurpa), made with diced organ meats and bread, onion, and tomato; dumpling soup (Turkmen: etli börek şurpasy); and mung bean soup (Turkmen: şurpa maş). Suytlash (Turkmen: süýtlaş, also süýtli unaş and süýtli aş) is a vermicelli pudding traditionally served as the second course at wedding feasts. Some variants use rice in lieu of vermicelli. Though considered by some Turkmen to be a type of porridge, Turkmen cookbooks categorize it as a soup. Drawing from culinary traditions of neighbors, lagman, a soupy Uyghur noodle dish, is also common.

== Beverages ==
As in the rest of Central Asia, green tea (Turkmen: çaý) is the primary drink, consumed at all hours. In the Turkmen language, çaý (pronounced "chai") can refer either to a meal (typically breakfast) or to sitting down for a visit over tea. In the Dashoguz region, it is sometimes drunk "Kazakh-style" with milk, often to disguise the salty taste of the drinking water in that area.

Gatyk, a thick drinking yogurt similar to kefir, is often served with breakfast and sometimes used as a condiment on börek or manty, replacing the traditional sour cream. The drink the nation is known for, however, is çal ("chal"), fermented camel's milk, which is a white sparkling beverage with a sour flavour, well-known in Central Asia, particularly in Turkmenistan. Because of specific preparation requirements and its being extremely perishable, çal presents a great challenge for exporters to ship outside Turkmenistan or the region for foreign consumption. It is similar to the Kyrgyz drink shoro. One source notes that Turkmens like to skim agaran (a type of butter) from the surface of chal.

=== Alcoholic beverages ===
Vodka (Turkmen: arak) is the most commonly consumed alcoholic beverage, due to its relatively low cost, followed by beer, wine, brandy, and sparkling wine (Russian: шампанское shampanskoye). Spirits and beer were introduced during the Russian imperial period. Beer was introduced in the 19th century by German brewers and, though not a traditional beverage, is popular in urban areas. Two domestic beer brands, Berk and Zip, are produced in Turkmenistan.

Archeological exploration indicates viticulture in the oasis area north of the Kopet Dag Mountains dating to the 3rd-2nd centuries BCE. Wheat was cultivated in the lowlands and vineyards were planted in the foothills. Wine grapes were also grown in the upper Murghab Valley near the present-day Turkmenistan-Afghanistan border. Introduction of Islam to Central Asia did not impede continuation of wine production, in part because wine is central to Sufism. In the 21st century, Turkmenistan produces over 200 different grape wines and brandies from 100 grape varieties.

== Fish ==
Fish forms part of the traditional diet of Turkmen tribes residing near the Caspian Sea and along the Amu Darya. The Caspian Turkmen recipes call for both grilling and frying fish, but serving with "sesame, rice, apricots, raisins, pomegranate juice."

== Foreign influences ==
Restaurants in Turkmenistan often also serve Russian fare such as pelmeni, buckwheat, golubtsy, and a wide variety of mayonnaise-based salads. The potato and tomato, both introduced from the New World, are widely used in meal preparation. Urban steakhouses have appeared in Ashgabat, the capital city.

In Turkmen cities of Iran, some restaurants serve common Persian foods such as jujeh kabab and chelow kabab, and some shops only cook kebabs and inner organs like liver and fat, which are cooked with skewers on mangal as in kebab shops in other parts of Iran.

== See also ==
- Central Asian cuisine
- Soviet cuisine

== Bibliography ==
- Bagdasarov, A.; Vanukevich, A.; Hudaýşukurow, T. (1981), Tуркменская кулинария [Turkmen Cuisine] (in Russian), Ashgabat: Izdatel'stvo "Turkmenistan"
- Berdimuhamedow, Gurbanguly (2014), Turkmen dastarkhan, Dishes of the national cuisine, Ashgabat: Turkmen State Publishing Service Volume 1, Volume 2
- Eden, Caroline (2020), Red Sands, London: Quadrille, ISBN 978-1-787-134829
- Esenova, Gyulshat (2019), Sachak, Traditional Turkmen Recipes in a Modern Kitchen, Gyulshat Esenova, ISBN 978-0-578-81405-6
- One Turkmen Kitchen, One Turkmen Kitchen, website with recipes
- Туркменская национальная кухня и ее особенности [Turkmen national cuisine and its particulars] (in Russian), Infoabad, 20 November 2021
