= Sanchuisanda =

Chinese flatbread

- Type: Flatbread
- Place of origin: China
- Main ingredients: Wheat flour dough, ashes

Sanchuisanda is the Chinese language name for a tortilla-like flatbread made by the Qiang people, an ethnic minority people from Sichuan, China. It is made of wheat flour dough baked in ashes by the side of an open wood fire. The ashes are then blown and patted off the finished loaf. The name literally means "three blows, three hits" and refers to this post-cooking cleaning.
