= Bataw (bread) =

Leavened flatbread from Egypt

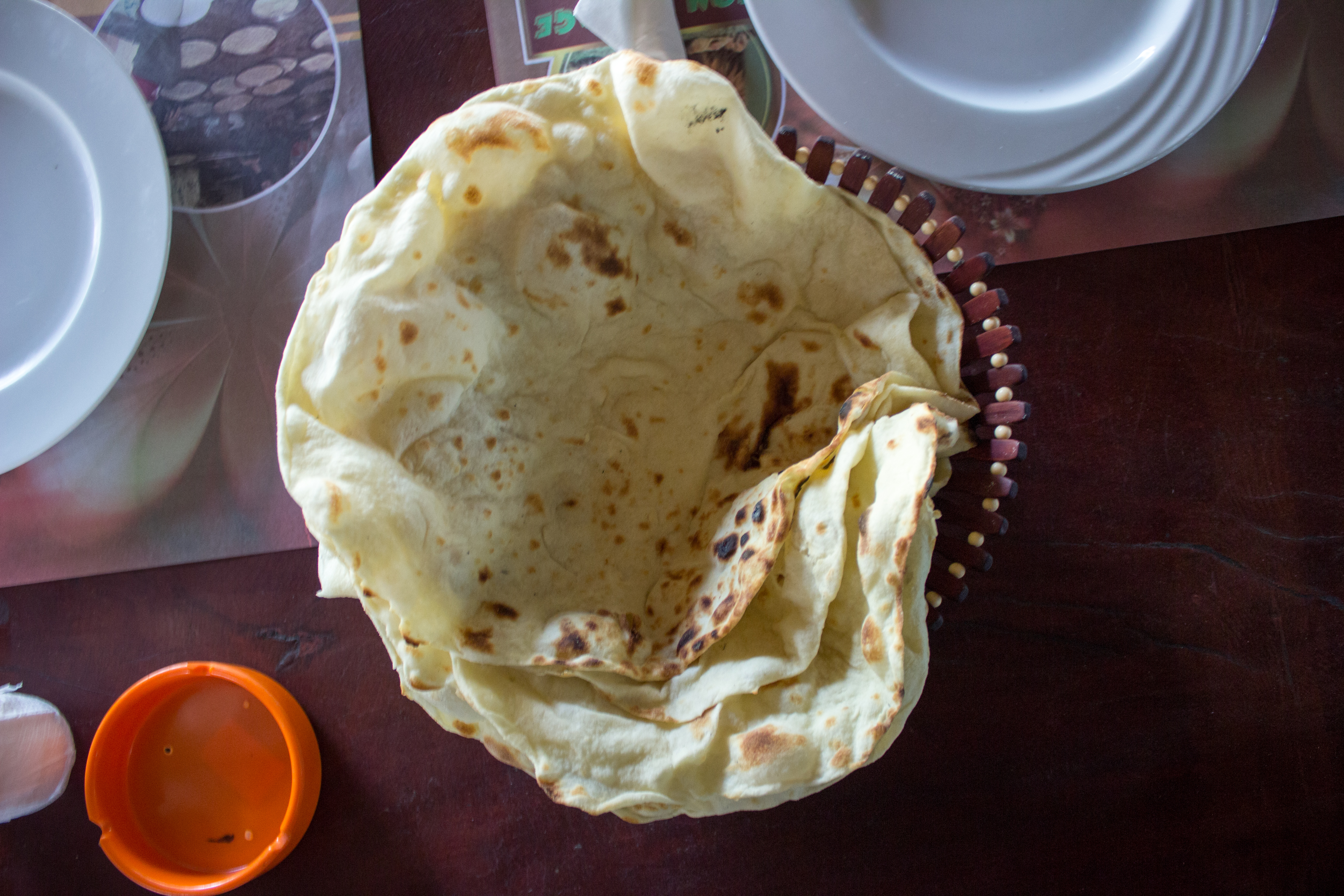
- Alternative names: Eish fellahi
- Type: Flatbread
- Place of origin: Egypt
- Main ingredients: Barley, corn, wheat and ground fenugreek seeds

Bataw (Egyptian Arabic: بتاو) is a leavened flatbread from Egypt. It is widely consumed in the Egyptian countryside. The main ingredients of the bread vary depending on the region.

== Variations ==
In Asyut it is often made with barley, corn, or a mixture of barley and wheat. In Akhmim it is commonly made with corn and fenugreek, whereas in Qena, further south in Upper Egypt, it is exclusively made with barley.

== Preparation ==
Ball-shaped lumps of dough are placed in an oven, traditionally with a wooden ladle with a long handle referred to as maghrafa (Egyptian Arabic: مغرفة), and then flattened with the bottom side of it. The loaf is removed when it turns brown and crusty.

== Consumption ==
In the countryside farmers often eat it with various types of soft white cheeses as a light meal between breakfast and dinner.

== See also ==
- Egyptian cuisine
