= Ishlykly =

Ishlykly (sometimes referred to as Ishlekli or Ishlyakdi in certain recipes) is a traditional dish similar to pizza but covered with dough. It consists of a two-layer dough stuffed with a mixture of meat (most commonly mutton) and vegetables, and is often prepared for special guests especially in Turkmenistan, Afghanistan and other places where Turkmens live.

Ishlekli is a traditional dish of Turkmen cuisine. It is a closed pie made from thin dough filled with a mixture of meat and vegetables, often likened to pizza. Ishlekli is usually prepared for honored guests. The filling most commonly uses lamb. Traditionally, it was baked in a hearth, buried in hot sand. Nowadays, it is prepared in a tandoor, placing the pie between two pans and burying it in ashes.

== Preparation ==
First, finely chop onion and pepper, then mix them with ground meat, adding salt and pepper to taste. Melt half of the butter, mixing it with water and a teaspoon of salt in a deep bowl. Gradually add flour to the mixture, kneading the dough, which is then covered with cling film and left for 30 minutes.

The dough is divided into two parts, each rolled into a rectangle and brushed with the remaining butter (previously melted). The dough is then rolled into a spiral, and the process is repeated with the second part. After 20 minutes, both pieces of dough are rolled into discs of equal size. Place the filling on one disc, cover it with the second disc, and pinch the edges closed. Brush the top with a beaten egg, create a small hole in the center, and sprinkle with sesame seeds. The pie is baked for 40 minutes.

== Ingredients ==
- Flour
- Ground meat
- Potato
- Onion
- Black pepper
- Salt
- Water
- Vegetable oil
