= Kaak (bread) =

Pakistani bread

- Type: Flatbread
- Place of origin: Pakistan
- Region or state: Pakistan
- Main ingredients: Wheat flour

Kaak (Balochi, Urdu, Pashto: کاک) is a kind of bread and a native dish of Baloch and Pashtun peoples. Kaak is cooked on ghargi (steamed stone). In the past, Kaak was a tradition in all Pashtun regions, but now people sometimes cook this traditional Pashtun dish for taste.

Popular among the nomadic Kaak is usually very hard once it has been baked. Hence, it is also sometimes called Pathar Ki Roti (Urdu: پتھر کی روٹی,, lit. 'bread of stone').

== Preparation ==
The dough for the bread is prepared with a mixture of flour, dry yeast, sugar, salt, milk, water and other ingredients based on the variation. The dough is then flattened and rolled over a preheated stone. Sometimes sesame seeds are added as a complement. The stone is then baked in a tannur until the bread is fully cooked. Although the dough starts out thin and limp, it expands and hardens greatly during the baking process. Kaak is often served with sajji.

== Traditions ==
In Baloch tradition, the matriarch of the home has the most say in how the kaak is prepared. Once the bread rises the responsibilities of the task are handed over to the younger women of the household to finish the job.

It is also customary among the Balochi people, that the father of the bride feeds his daughter kaak the night before her wedding.

== Festivities ==
During the summer seasons, a popular baker's festival is held in the town of Mahore called Khabaz Mahrajan Magiz. The festival highlights the best bakers from across the entire Pakistan, thus drawing very large crowds into the tens of thousands. It is customary at this festival to have an annual kaak competition, in which all the bakers submit their goods to a panel of judges. The winners of this competition, which include gold, silver, and bronze medalists, have the privilege to showcase their finest kaak at the grand opening ceremony for the festival the following year. The winner is chosen based on the flavor, size And color of their Ka’ak.

== In other cultures ==
In some Arab countries, ka'ak refers to a thin savoury pastry round, similar in shape to a bagel. These are often flavoured slightly with mahleb and covered with white sesame seeds. Kaak bi loz is a sweet version made with ground almonds.
