= Gnocco fritto =

Bread from Emilia-Romagna, Italy

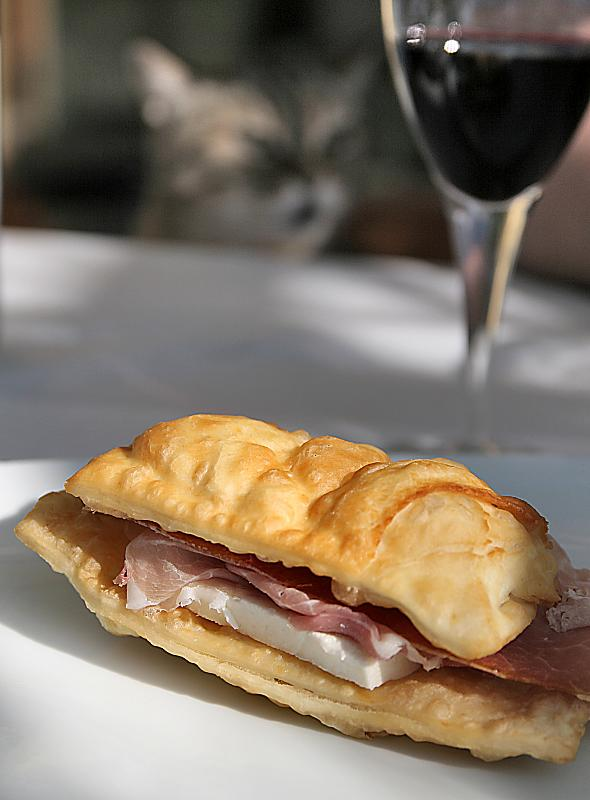
Crescentina served with cured meat and cheese

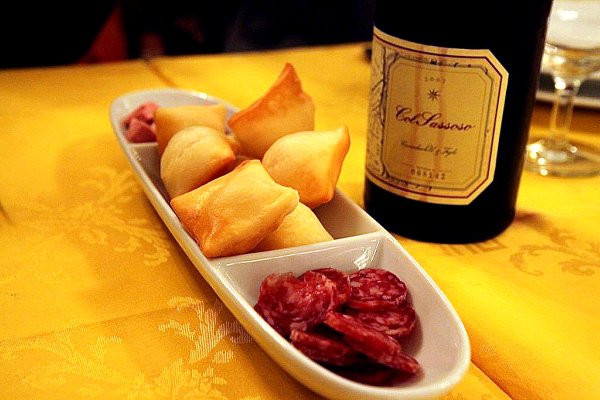
Gnocco fritto, salami and Lambrusco

The gnocco fritto (Italian: [ˈɲɔkko ˈfritto]) or crescentina (Italian: [kreʃʃenˈtiːna]) is an Italian bread from the Emilia-Romagna region of Italy, prepared using flour, water, and lard as its primary ingredients. Cracklings are sometimes used in its preparation as well. In Emilia-Romagna, it is typically sliced into diamond shapes and then fried, and may be accompanied with cheese and salumi. When it is fried, the bread puffs up, and it may include yeast or baking soda to leaven it. Versions prepared with milk are softer than those prepared with water. It may be served either as an appetizer or as a main dish. Despite the name by which it is often referred to in Italy, as a kind of gnocchi, it is technically not.

== Etymology ==
The name crescentina is derived from the Italian verb crescere, meaning 'to grow', referring to it puffing up during the cooking.

== Variants ==
A version of the dish in the city of Bologna, Emilia-Romagna, is prepared with the bread sliced into round shapes, which are then fried. Pieces of prosciutto (thinly sliced dry-cured ham) may be incorporated into the dough. In Pavullo nel Frignano, a town and comune (municipality) in the province of Modena, crescentina modenese is prepared with lard and yeast and cooked over a piastrata (a sort of grill plate), rather than fried.

In Tuscany, crescentina is dusted with salt or sugar after being fried, and sometimes Tuscan salami is incorporated into the dough.

Crescia is a version in the town and comune of Gubbio, in the province of Perugia that is prepared with oil and salt and baked in an oven. Its name is associated with pieces of dough that were given to children for them to play with, which were then cooked at the edge of an oven, referred to as chichiripieno.

Spianata is a variation prepared using eggs and ricotta cheese in the dough mixture. The term spianata originally referred to pieces of flat dough that were used to test an oven's heat prior to cooking.

== See also ==
- List of breads
- Frybread

== Bibliography ==
- Manzi, P. (2014). Aperitivi ed appetizer (in Italian). Peppino Manzi. pp. 113–114. ISBN 978-88-6885-777-6. – Gnocco fritto o crescentina
