= Panigaccio =

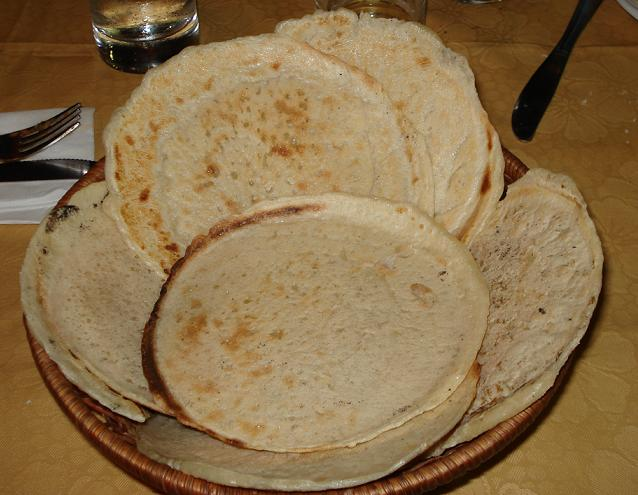
- Alternative names: Panigazzo
- Type: Bread
- Place of origin: Italy
- Region or state: Tuscany; Liguria

Panigaccio or panigazzo is a type of round, unleavened and crispy bread from Italy. They are officially listed as prodotto agroalimentare tradizionale (PAT) in both Tuscany and Liguria.

Panigacci are baked in a special terracotta and mica dish over a high flame in a bonfire or wood-fired oven. A batter made from flour, water, and salt is placed between one testo and another to form a stack. Some areas in Lunigiana have a sweet version served at the end of the meal with chocolate spread.

Panigacci have ancient origins and are widespread in Lunigiana and eastern Liguria, where they are called panigazzi. They originated in the mountains of Podenzana and Bolano. In Liguria, terracotta and mica pans have been manufactured since time immemorial in Iscioli, in the comune (municipality) of Ne, in the hinterland of Chiavari, and can be found in shops and agricultural consortia in the Chiavari area.
