= Lists of foods =

Categorically organized list of food items

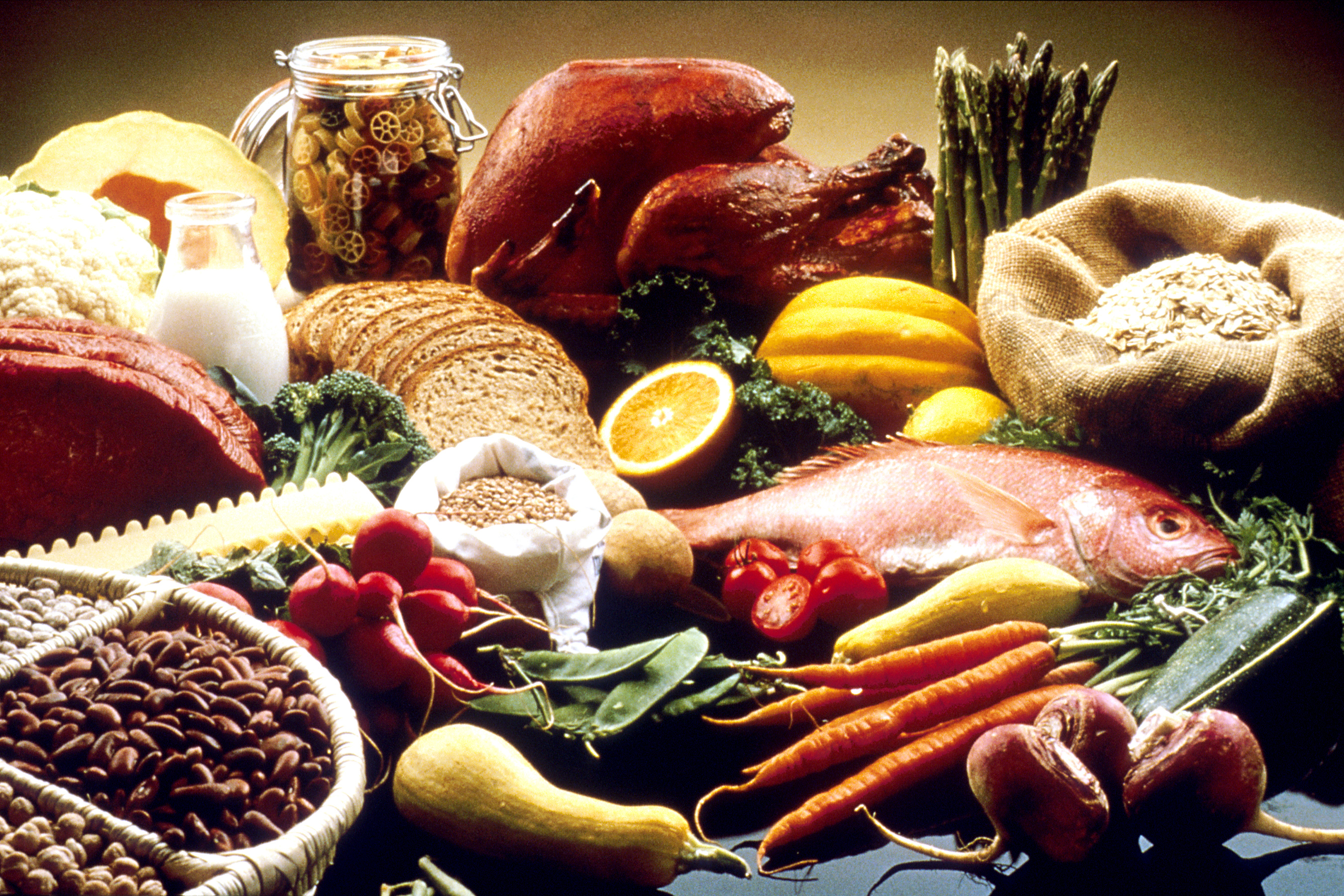
Various foods

This is a categorically organized list of foods. Food is any substance consumed to provide nutritional support for the body. It is produced either by plants, animals, or fungi, and contains essential nutrients, such as carbohydrates, fats, proteins, vitamins, and minerals. The substance is ingested by an organism and assimilated by the organism's cells in an effort to produce energy, maintain life, or stimulate growth.

== Basic foods ==
=== Baked goods ===
Baked goods are cooked by baking, a method of cooking food that uses prolonged dry heat.

=== Breads ===
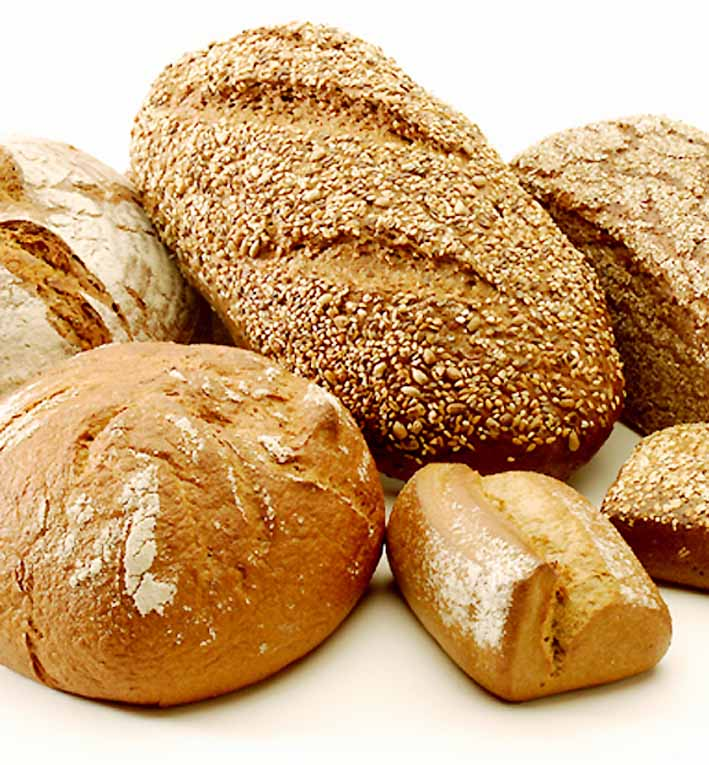
Various leavened breads

- Breads – Bread is a staple food prepared from a dough of flour and water, usually by baking. Throughout recorded history it has been popular around the world and is one of humanity's oldest foods, having been of importance since the dawn of agriculture.

- List of breads

- List of American breads
- List of brand name breads
- List of bread rolls
- List of buns
- List of British breads
- List of Indian breads
- List of Pakistani breads
- List of quick breads
- List of sweet breads

- List of bread dishes

- List of fried dough foods

- List of doughnut varieties

=== Cereals ===
- Cereals – True cereals are the seeds of certain species of grasses. Maize, wheat, and rice account for about half of the calories consumed by people every year. Grains can be ground into flour for bread, cake, noodles, and other food products. They can also be boiled or steamed, either whole or ground, and eaten as is. Many cereals are present or past staple foods, providing a large fraction of the calories in the places that they are eaten.

- List of breakfast cereals
- List of maize dishes
- List of porridges

=== Dairy products ===
- Dairy products – Dairy products are food produced from the milk of mammals. Dairy products are usually high energy-yielding food products. A production plant for the processing of milk is called a dairy or a dairy factory. Apart from breastfed infants, the human consumption of dairy products is sourced primarily from the milk of cows, yet goats, sheep, yaks, horses, camels, and other mammals are other sources of dairy products consumed by humans.

- List of dairy products
- List of butter dishes
- List of cheeses

- List of American cheeses
- List of Armenian cheeses
- List of brined cheeses
- List of British cheeses
- List of French cheeses
- List of Irish cheeses
- List of Italian cheeses
- List of Norwegian cheeses
- List of Polish cheeses

- List of cheese dishes

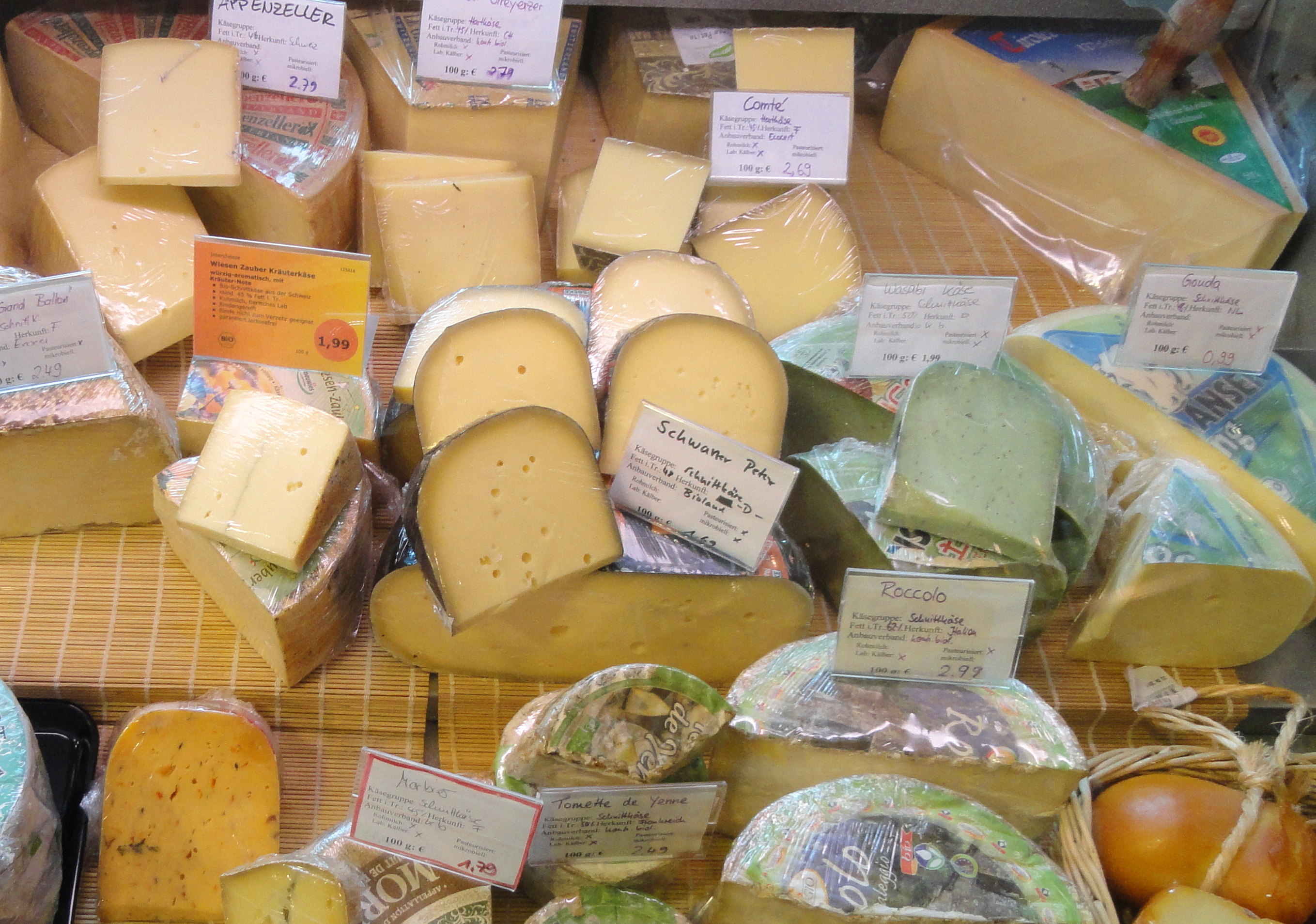
Various cheeses

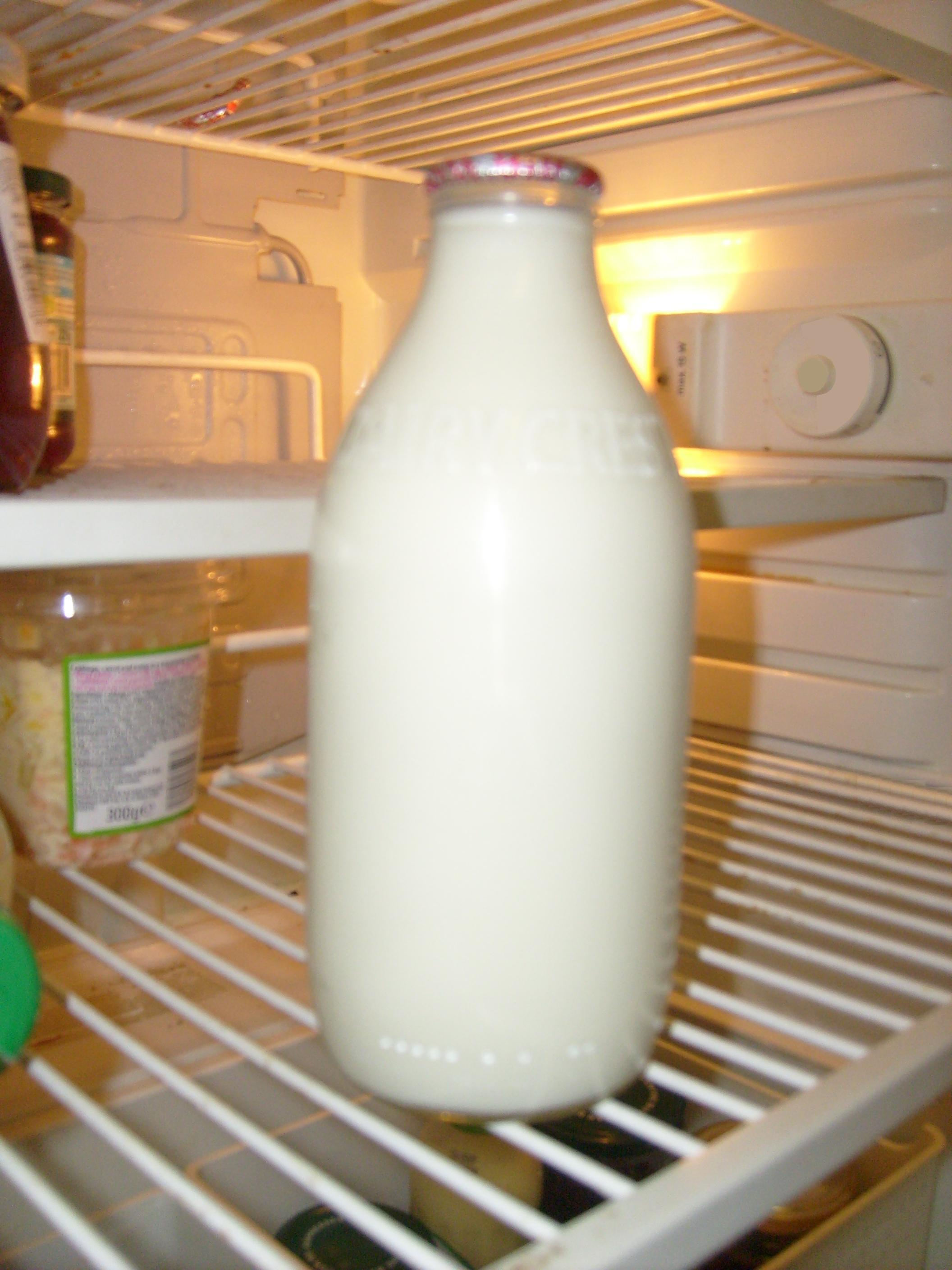
A bottle of milk

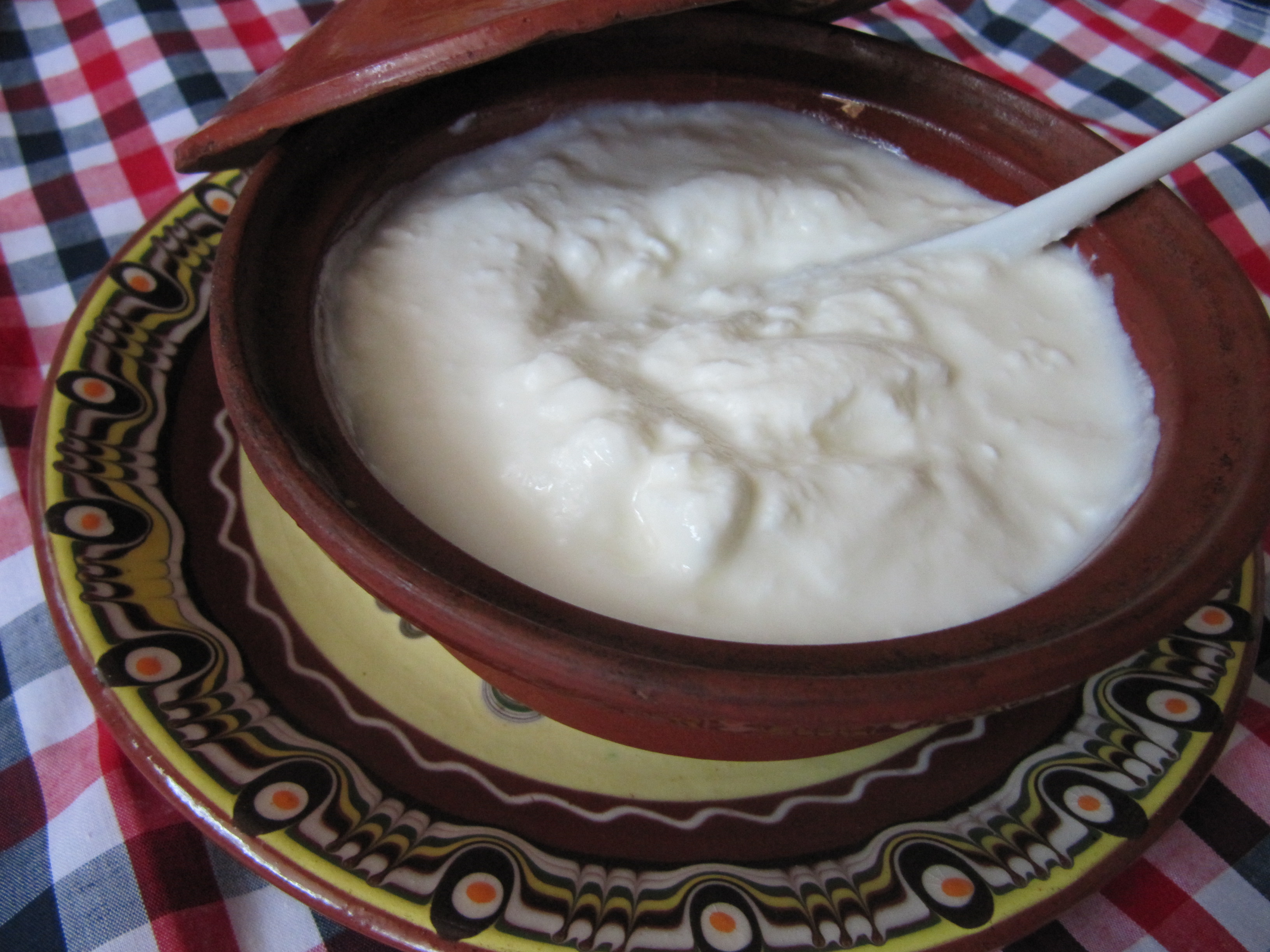
Yogurt

=== Edible plants ===
- Edible plants

- Fruit – In common language usage, fruit normally means the fleshy seed-associated structures of a plant that are sweet or sour and edible in the raw state, such as apples, oranges, grapes, strawberries, bananas, and lemons. On the other hand, the botanical sense of "fruit" includes many structures that are not commonly called "fruits", such as bean pods, corn kernels, wheat grains, and tomatoes.

- List of culinary fruits
- List of citrus fruits
- List of coconut dishes
- List of fruit dishes

- List of apple dishes
- List of avocado dishes
- List of banana dishes
- List of cherry dishes
- List of grape dishes
- List of lemon dishes and beverages
- List of melon dishes
- List of plum dishes
- List of squash and pumpkin dishes

- List of edible plants and mushrooms of southeast Alaska
- List of plants used in South Asian cuisine

- Edible tubers – Not all tubers are edible. Those that are include potatoes, sweet potatoes and yams. Tubers are various types of modified plant structures that are enlarged to store nutrients. They are used by plants to survive the winter or dry months, to provide energy and nutrients for regrowth during the next growing season, and as a means of asexual reproduction. There are both stem and root tubers.

- List of root vegetables
- List of potato dishes
- List of sweet potato cultivars

- Vegetables – In culinary terms, a vegetable is an edible plant or its part, intended for cooking or eating raw.

- List of vegetables
- List of leaf vegetables
- List of vegetable dishes

- List of cabbage dishes
- List of carrot dishes
- List of eggplant dishes
- List of garlic dishes
- List of onion dishes

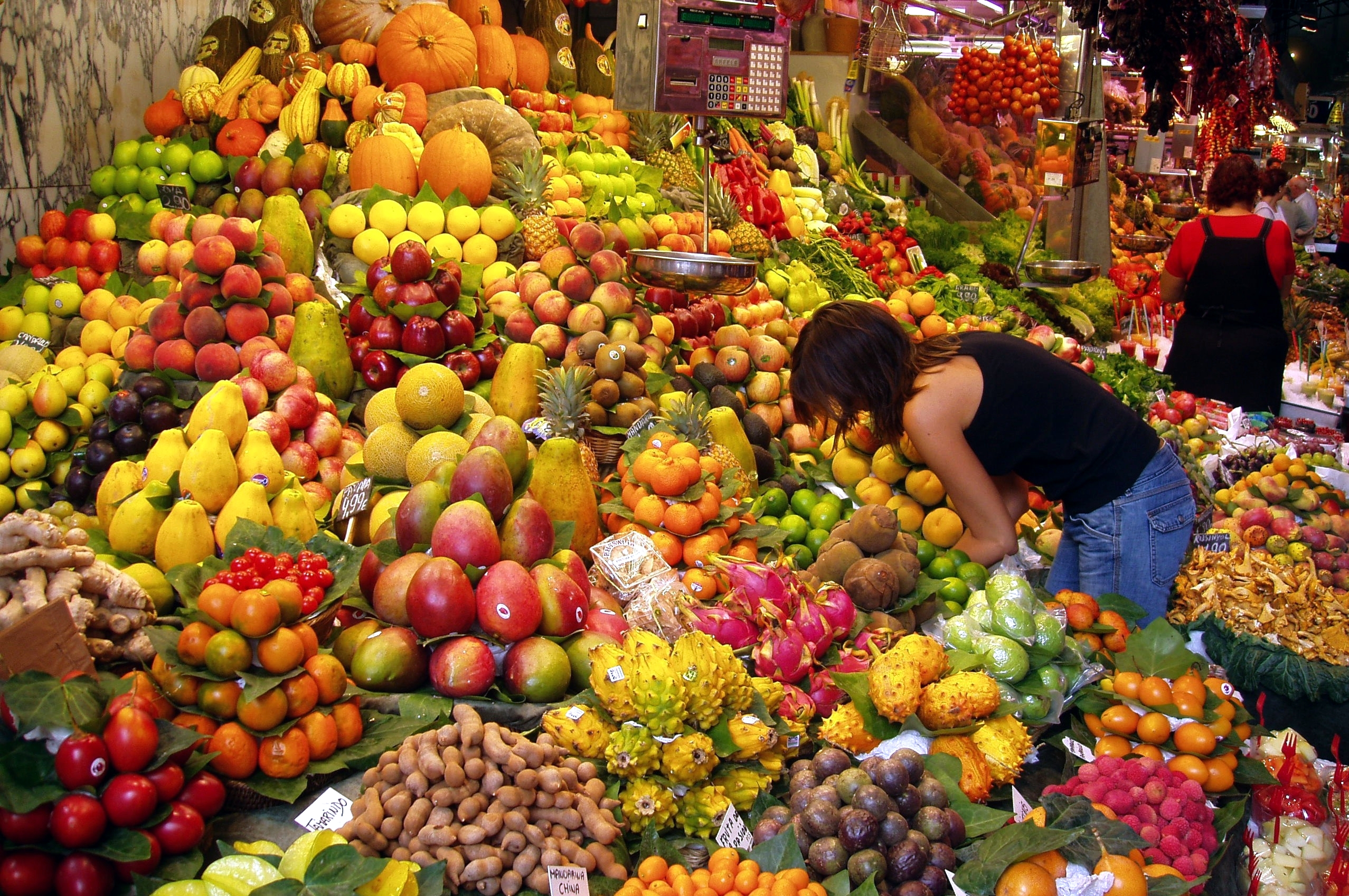
Several culinary fruits

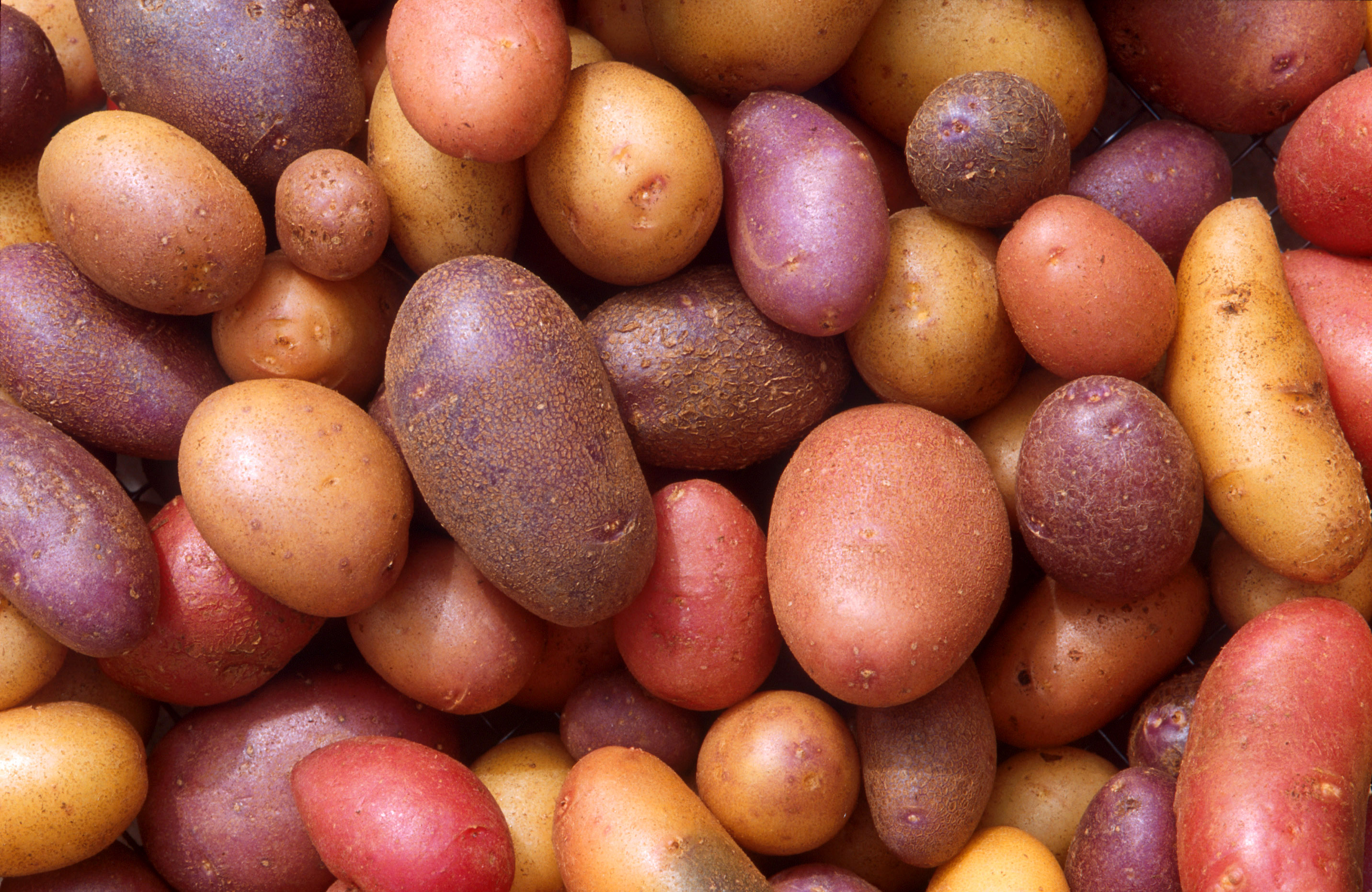
Edible tubers – a variety of potato cultivars

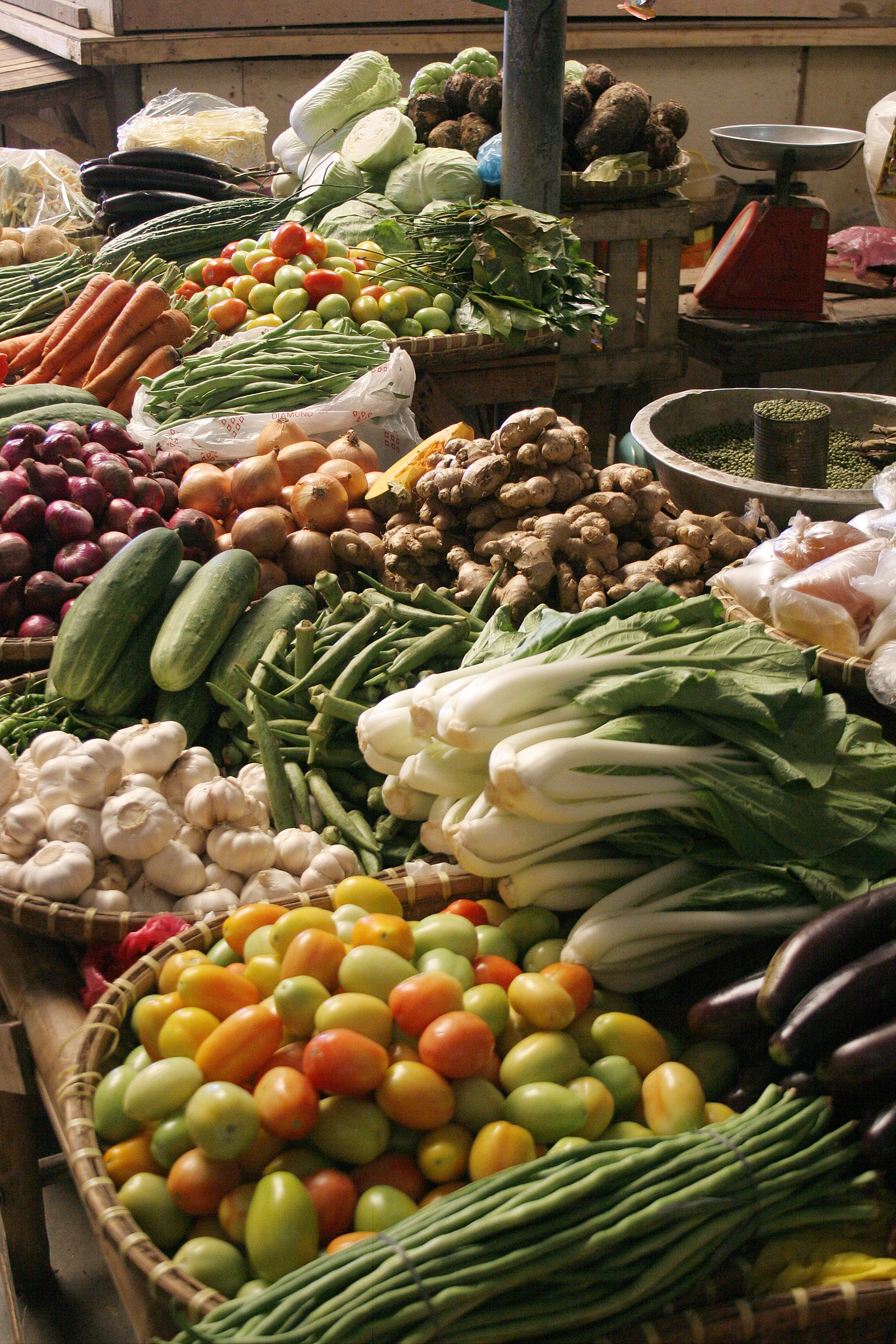
Vegetables

=== Edible fungi ===
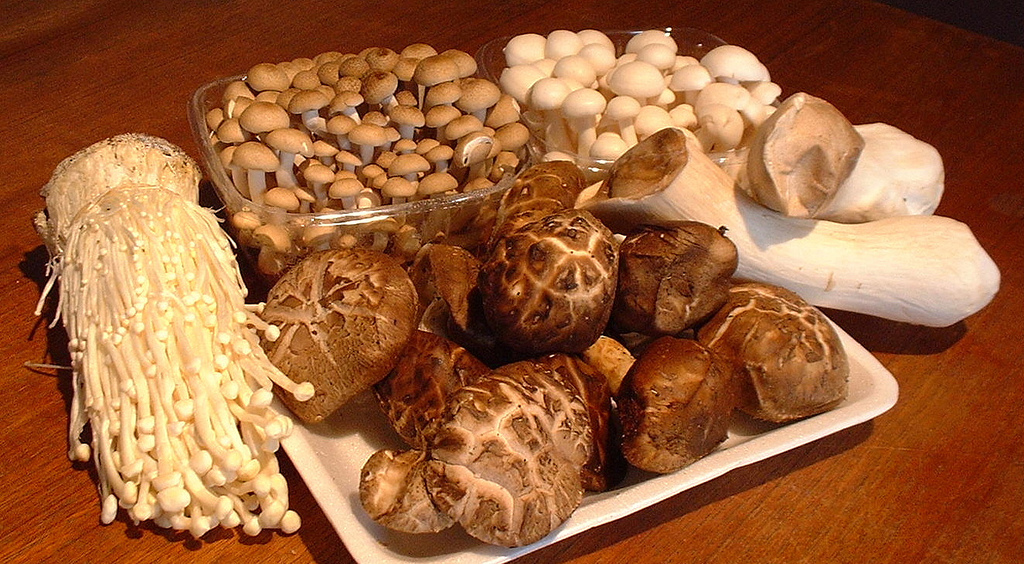
Commercial cultivated Japanese edible mushroom species

- Edible fungi – Edible fungi are the fleshy and edible fruit bodies of several species of macrofungi (fungi which bear fruiting structures that are large enough to be seen with the naked eye). They can appear either below ground (hypogeous) or above ground (epigeous) where they may be picked by hand. Edibility may be defined by criteria that include absence of poisonous effects on humans and desirable taste and aroma.

- Edible mushroom
- List of mushroom dishes

=== Edible nuts and seeds ===
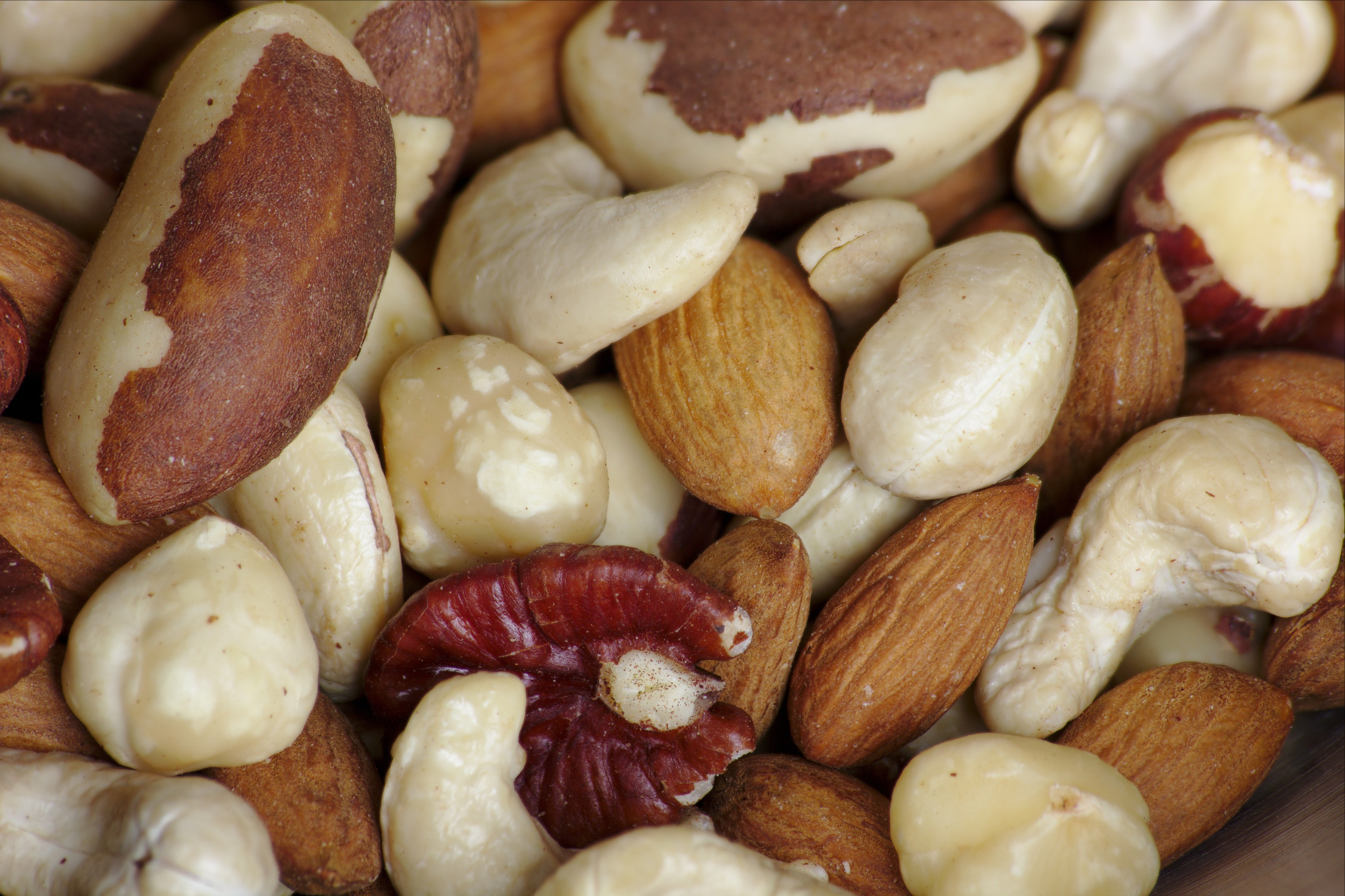
Raw mixed nuts

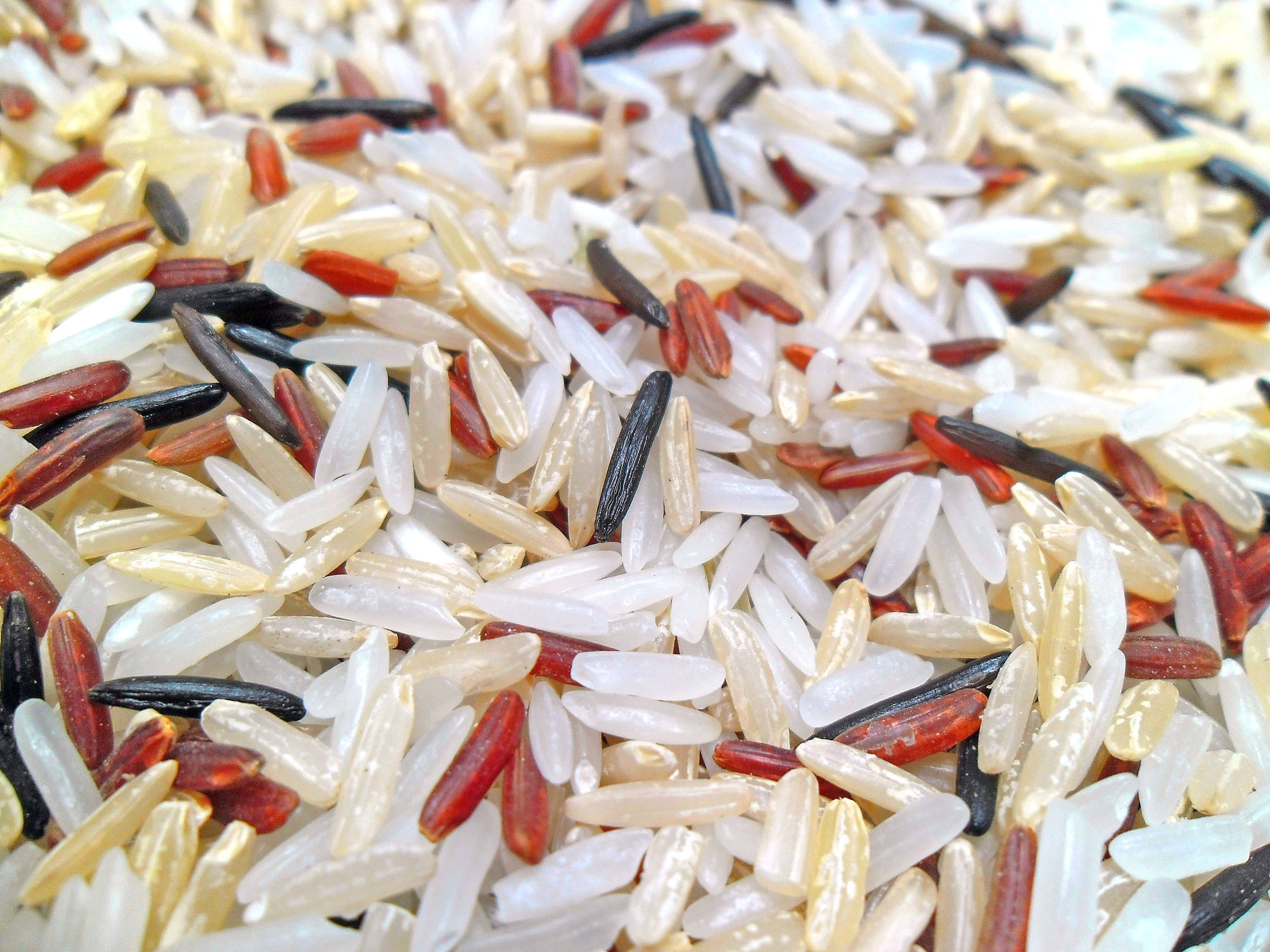
Rice is the seed of the monocot plants Oryza sativa (Asian rice) or Oryza glaberrima (African rice). Pictured is a mixture of brown, white, and red indica rice, (also containing wild rice).

- Edible nuts and seeds – Nut is a fruit composed of a hard shell and a seed, where the hard-shelled fruit does not open to release the seed (indehiscent). In a culinary context, a wide variety of dried seeds are often called nuts, but in a botanical context, only ones that include the indehiscent fruit are considered true nuts. The translation of "nut" in certain languages frequently requires paraphrases, as the word is ambiguous.

Many seeds are edible and the majority of human calories comes from seeds, especially from cereals, legumes and nuts. Seeds also provide most cooking oils, many beverages and spices and some important food additives.

- List of culinary nuts
- List of edible seeds
- List of sesame seed dishes

=== Legumes ===
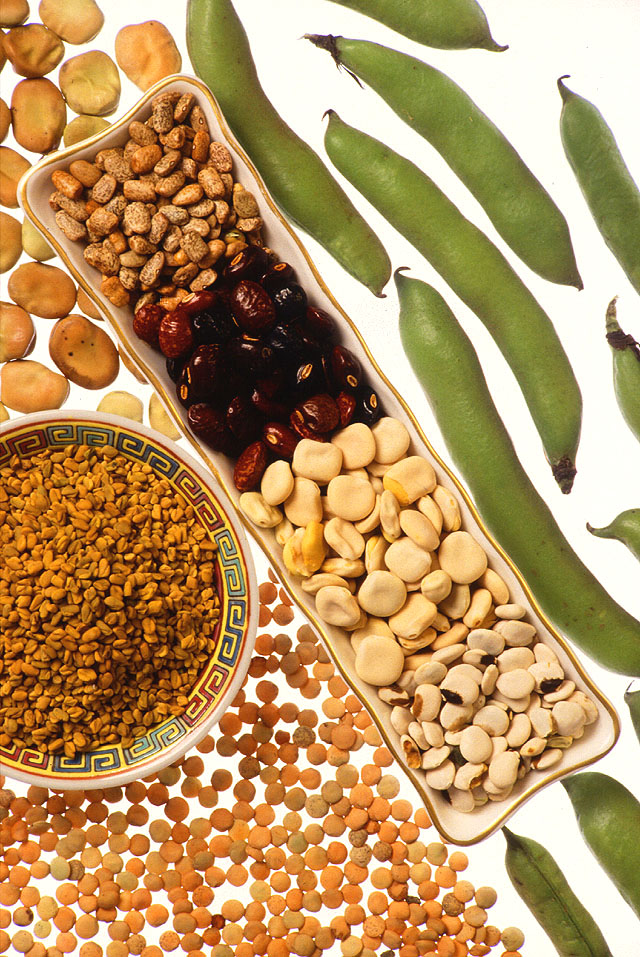
A selection of various legumes

- Edible legumes
  - Legumes are grown agriculturally, primarily for their food grain seed (e.g., beans and lentils, or generally pulse), for livestock forage and silage, and as soil-enhancing green manure. Legumes are notable in that most of them have symbiotic nitrogen-fixing bacteria in structures called root nodules. Well-known legumes include: alfalfa, clover, peas, beans, lentils, lupins, mesquite, carob, soybeans, peanuts, and tamarind.
    - List of legume dishes
    - List of tofu dishes

=== Meat ===
- Meat – Meat is animal flesh that is eaten as food. Humans are omnivorous, and have hunted and killed animals for meat since prehistoric times. The advent of civilization allowed the domestication of animals such as chickens, sheep, pigs and cattle, and eventually their use in meat production on an industrial scale. Today, humans consume not only chicken, mutton, pork and beef but also the meat of camel, horse, dog, cat, alligator, crocodile, turtle, dolphin, emu, ostrich, duck, deer, zebra, water buffalo, moose, bison, elk, beaver, whale, snake, frog, guinea pig, rabbit, squirrel, porcupine, and monkey.

- List of meat dishes
- List of beef dishes
- List of chicken dishes
- List of domesticated meat animals
- List of hamburgers
- List of hams
- List of kebabs
- List of pork dishes

- List of bacon dishes

- List of sausages

- List of hot dogs
- List of sausage dishes

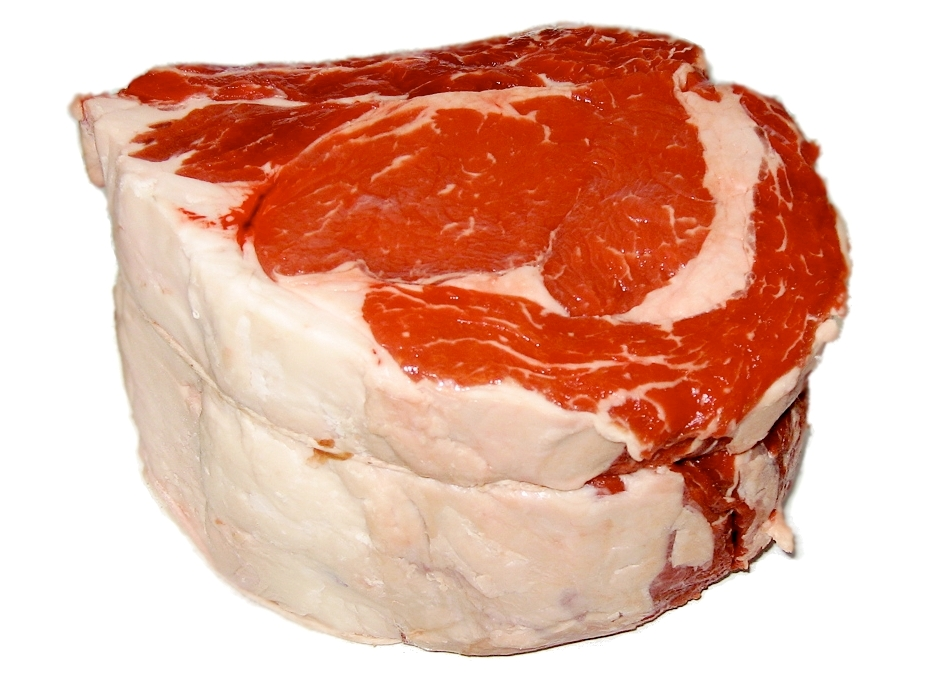
The standing rib roast, a cut of beef

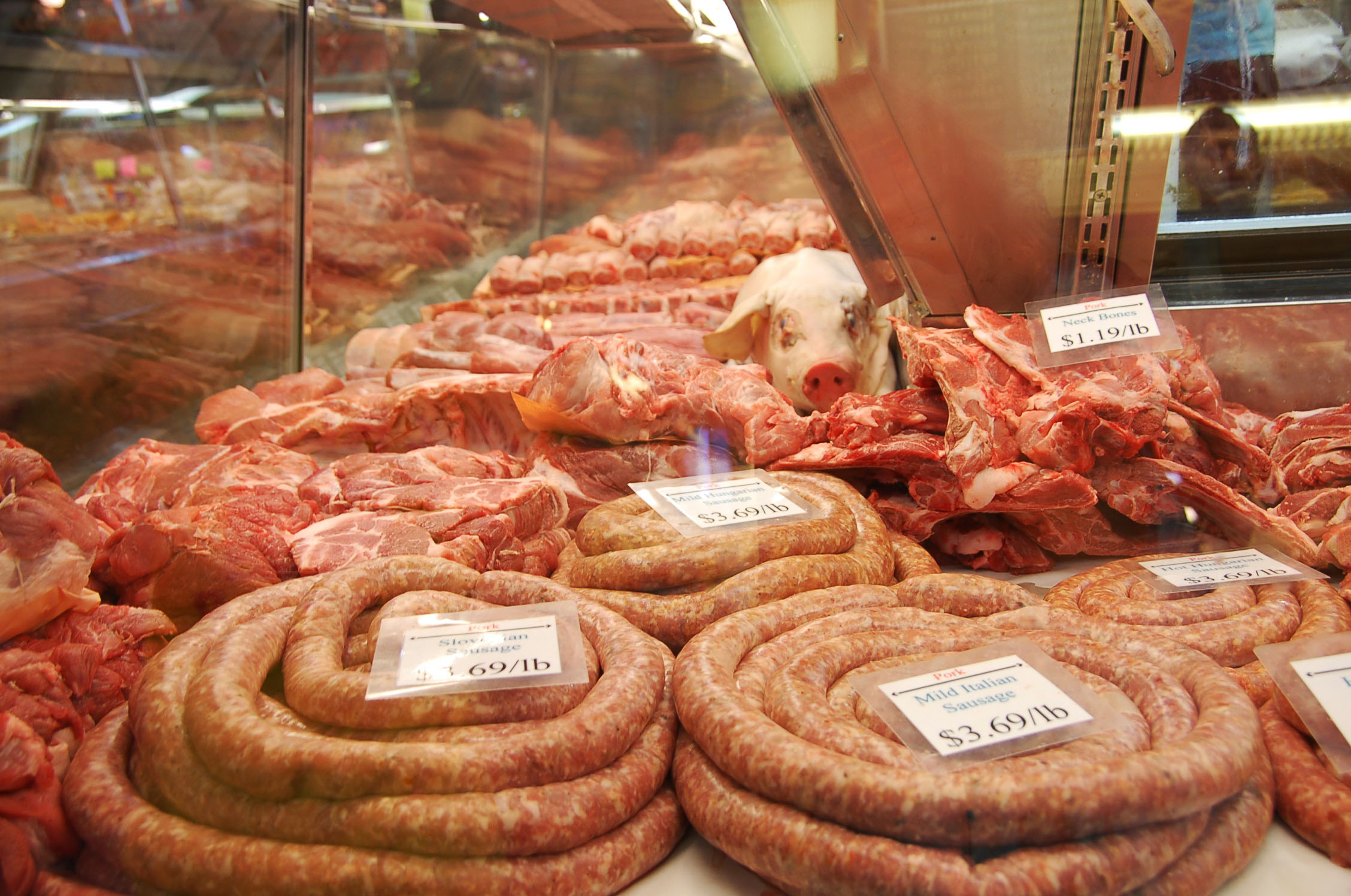
Various meats

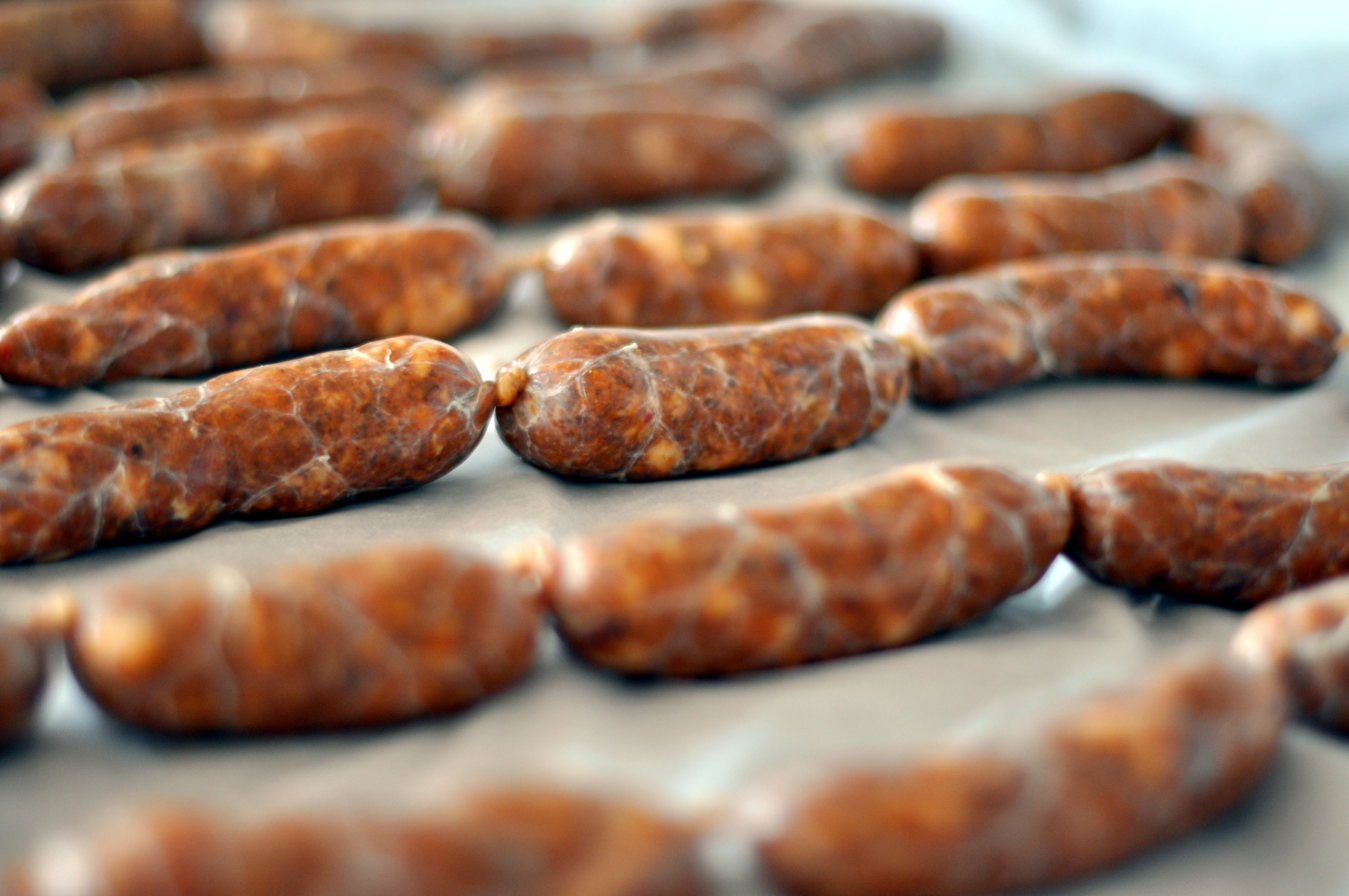
Chorizo sausage

=== Eggs ===
- Eggs – Eggs are laid by female animals of many different species, including birds, reptiles, amphibians, and fish, and have been eaten by humans for thousands of years. Bird and reptile eggs consist of a protective eggshell, albumen (egg white), and vitellus (egg yolk), contained within various thin membranes. Popular choices for egg consumption are chicken, duck, quail, roe, and caviar, but the egg most often consumed by humans is the chicken egg, by a wide margin.

- List of egg dishes
- List of egg topics

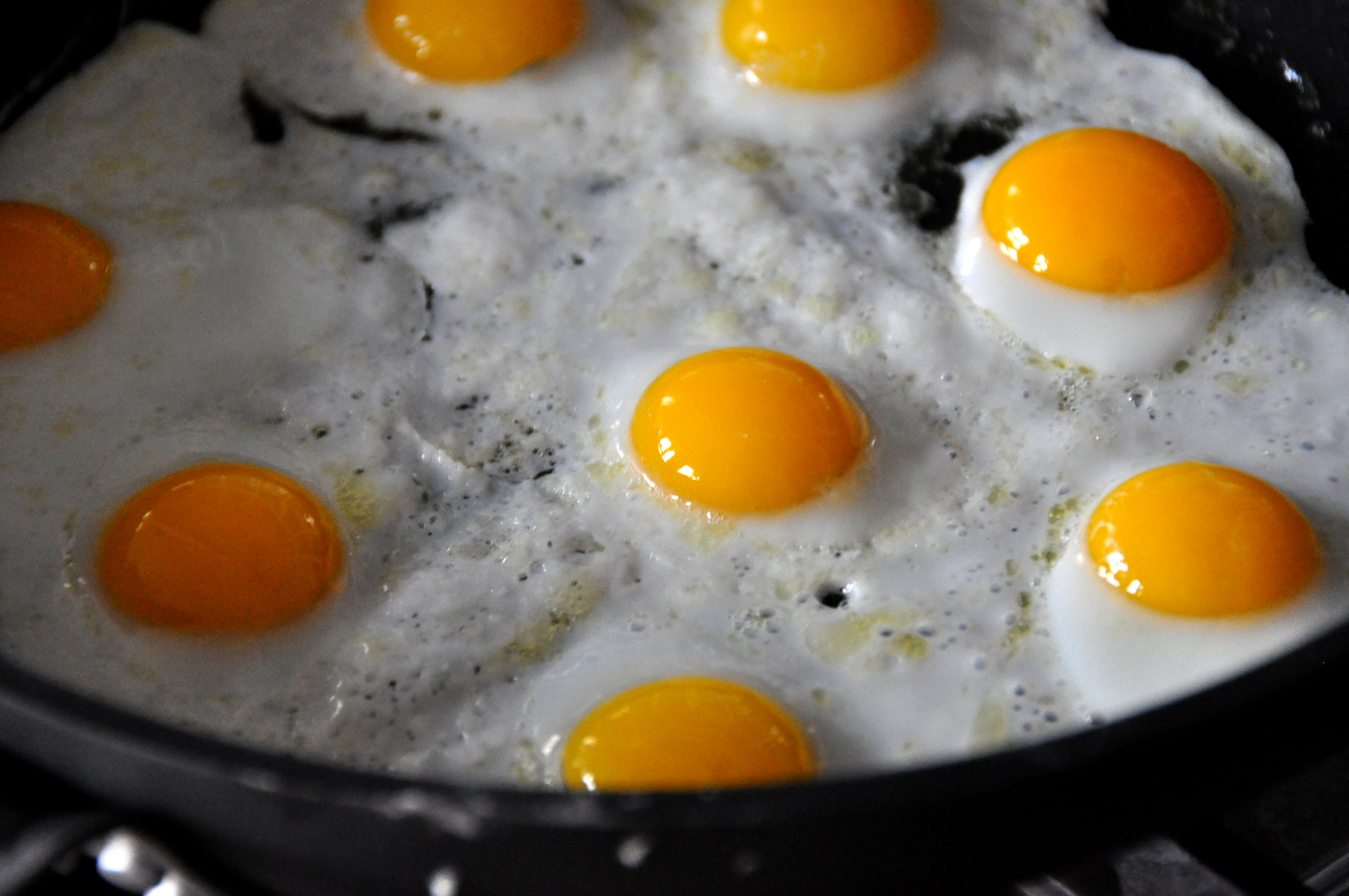
Fried eggs

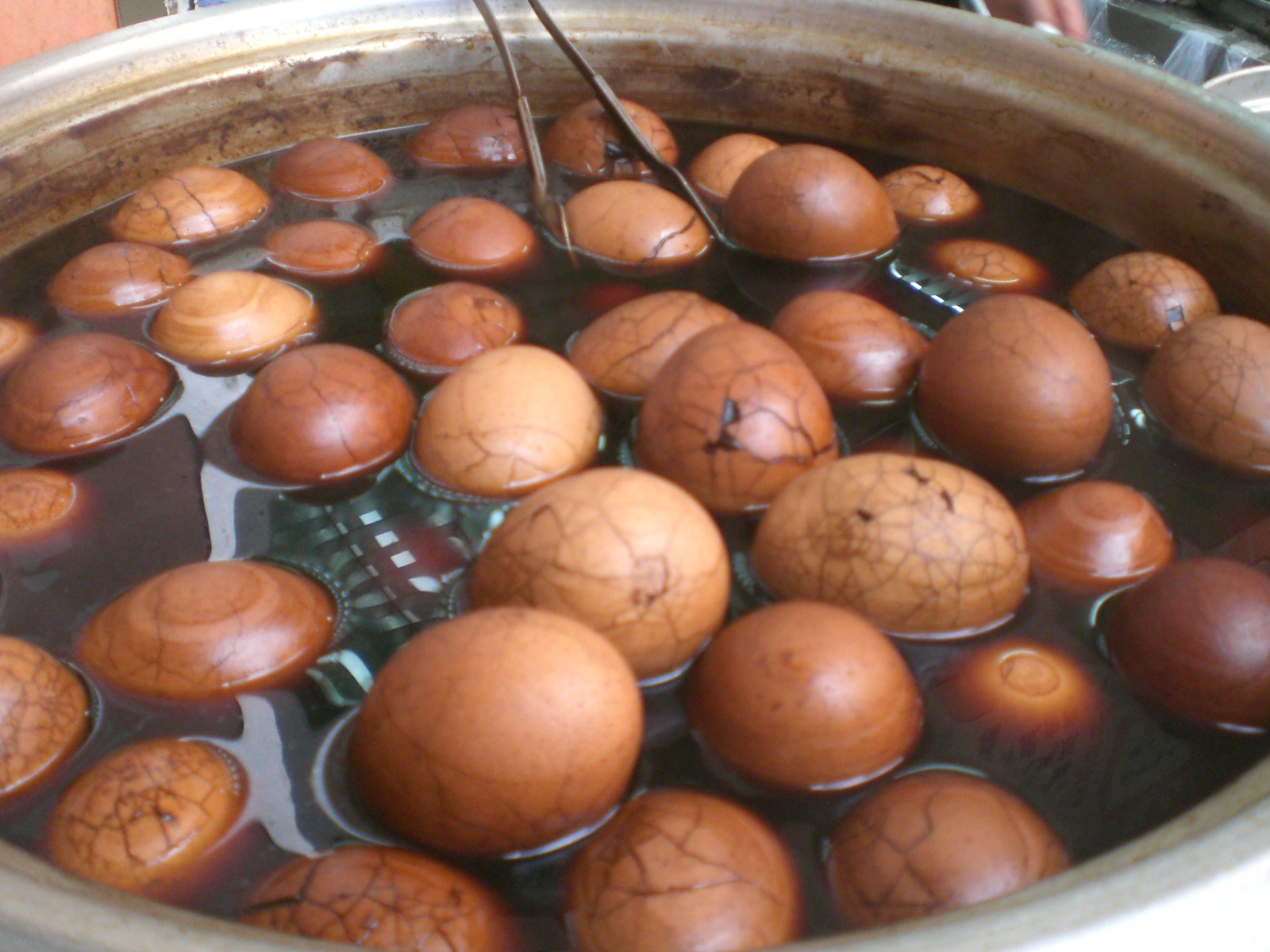
A batch of tea eggs with shell still on soaking in a brew of spices and tea, an example of edible eggs

=== Rice ===
- List of rice cakes
- List of rice dishes

=== Seafood ===
- Seafood – Seafood is any form of sea life regarded as food by humans. Seafood prominently includes fish and shellfish. Shellfish include various species of molluscs, crustaceans, and echinoderms.

- Fish – Fish is consumed as a food by many species, including humans. The word "fish" refers to both the animal and to the food prepared from it. In culinary and fishery contexts, the term fish also includes shellfish, such as molluscs, crustaceans and echinoderms. Fish has been an important source of protein for humans throughout recorded history.

- List of fish dishes

- List of cod dishes
- List of herring dishes
- List of raw fish dishes

- List of seafood dishes
- Edible seaweed

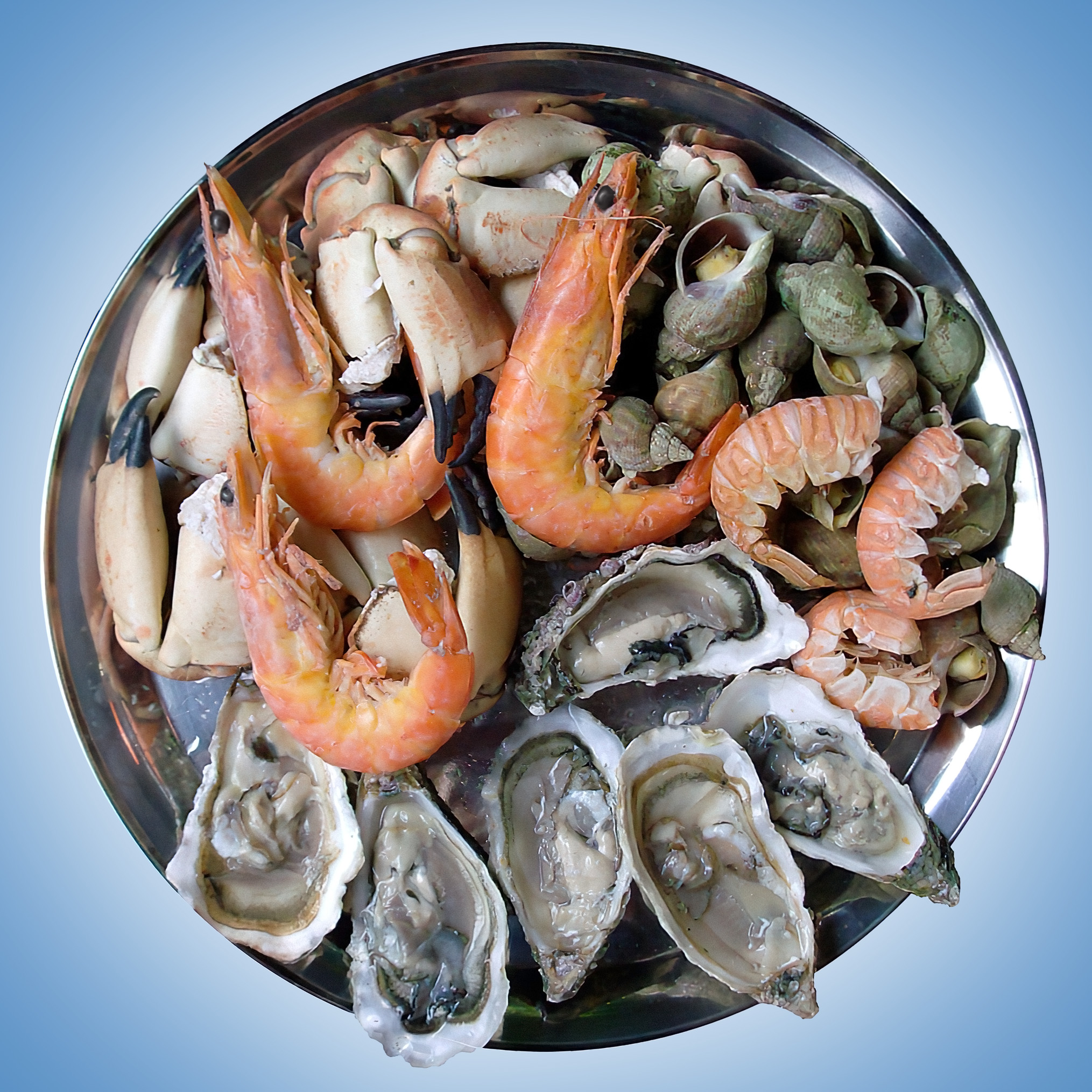
Seafood includes any form of food taken from the sea

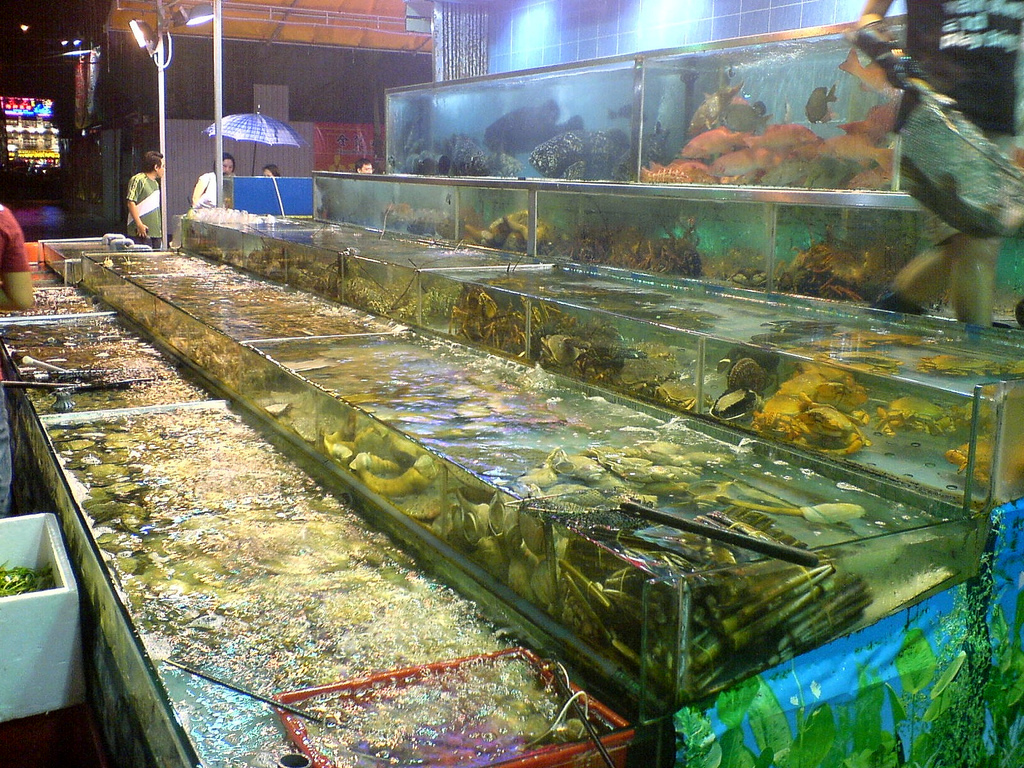
Tanks of seafood at a Cantonese restaurant

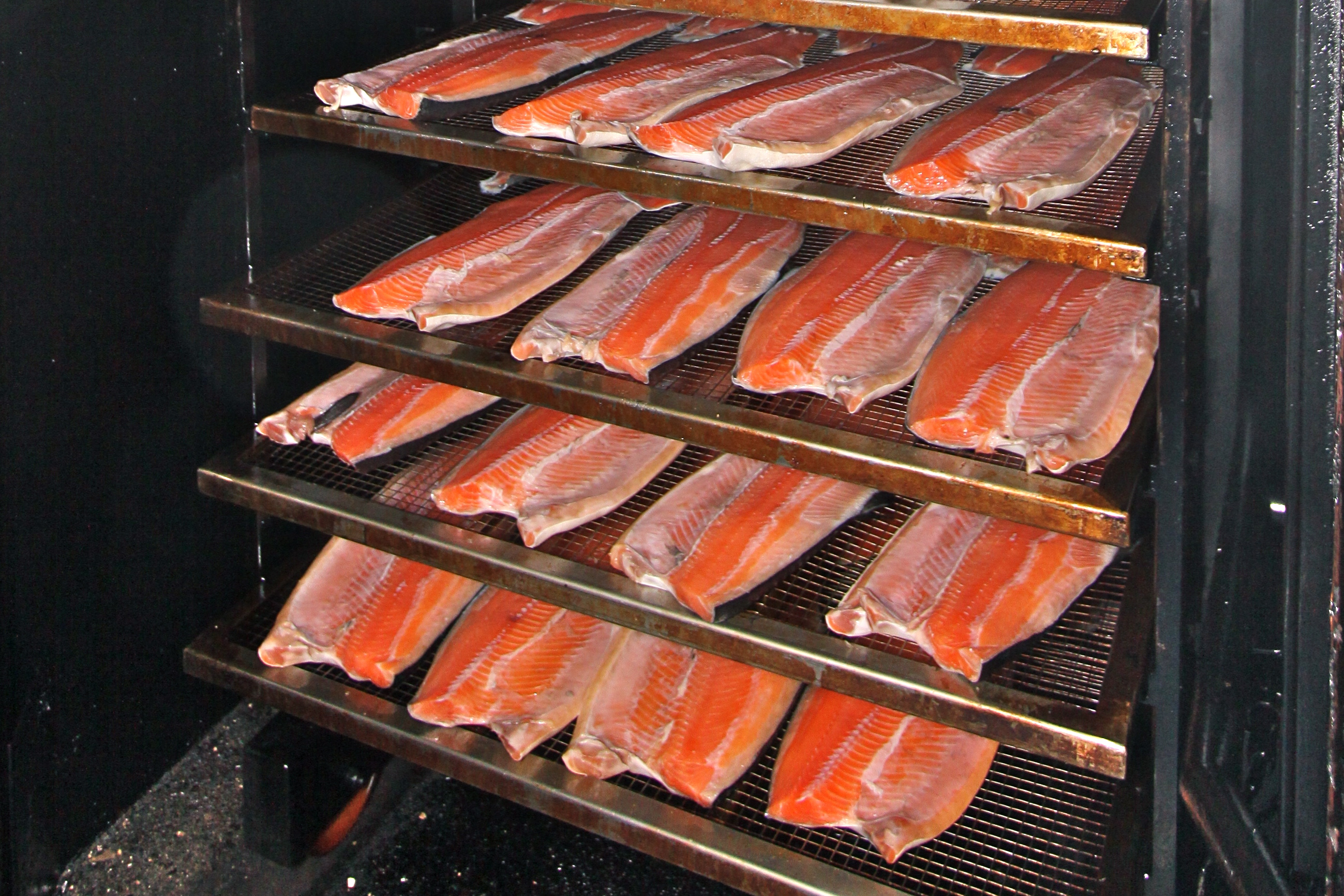
The preparation of smoked salmon

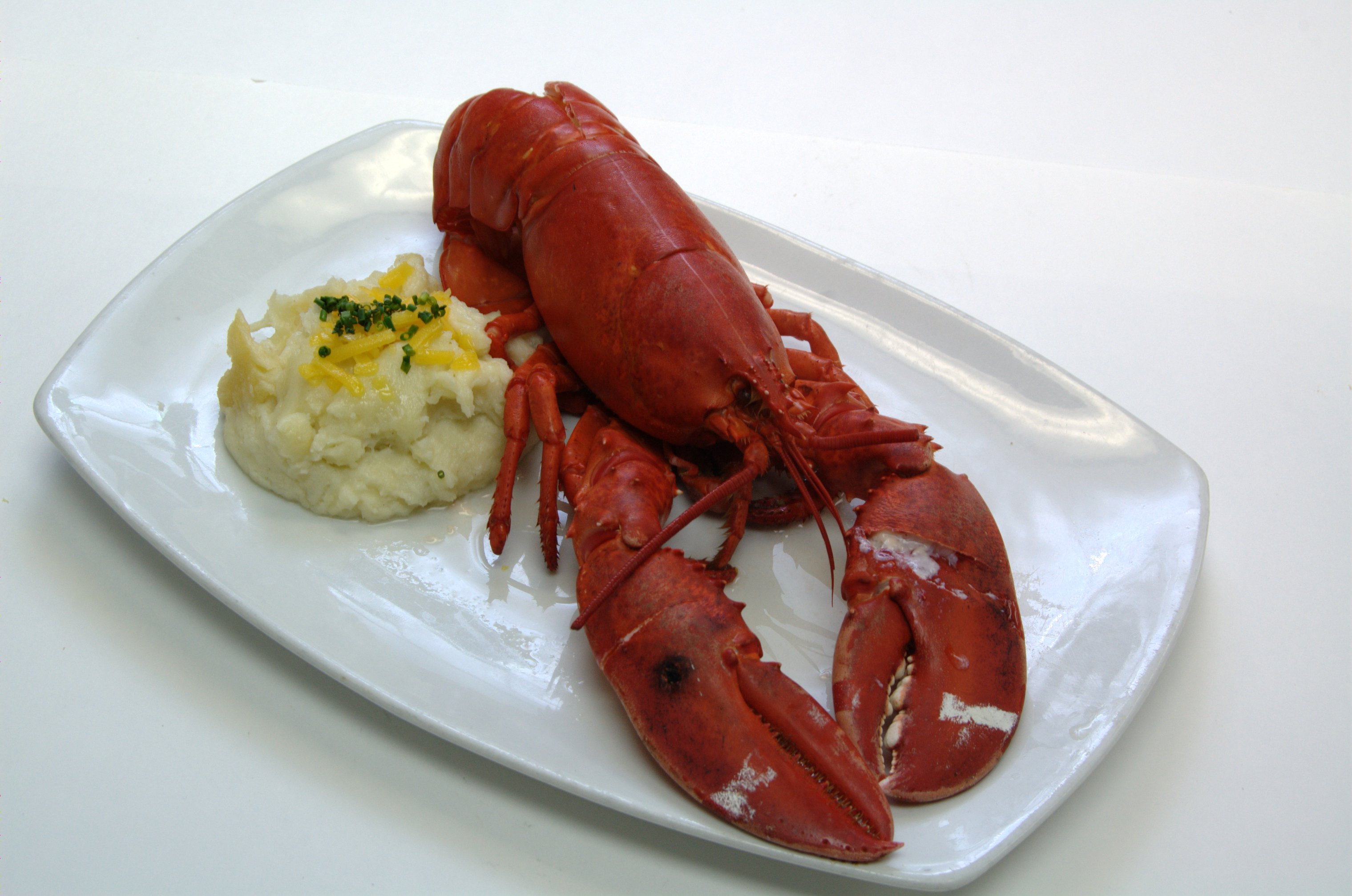
Prepared lobster

== Staple foods ==
- Staple foods – Staple food, sometimes called food staple or staple, is a food that is eaten routinely and in such quantities that it constitutes a dominant portion of a standard diet in a given population, supplying a large fraction of the needs for energy-rich materials and generally a significant proportion of the intake of other nutrients as well. Most people live on a diet based on just a small number of staples. Most staple plant foods are derived either from cereals such as wheat, barley, rye, maize, or rice, or starchy tubers or root vegetables such as potatoes, yams, taro, and cassava. Other staple foods include pulses (dried legumes), sago (derived from the pith of the sago palm tree), and fruits such as breadfruit and plantains. Of more than 50,000 edible plant species in the world, only a few hundred contribute significantly to human food supplies. Just 15 crop plants provide 90 percent of the world's food energy intake (exclusive of meat), with rice, maize and wheat comprising two-thirds of human food consumption. These three alone are the staples of over 4 billion people.
Staple foods

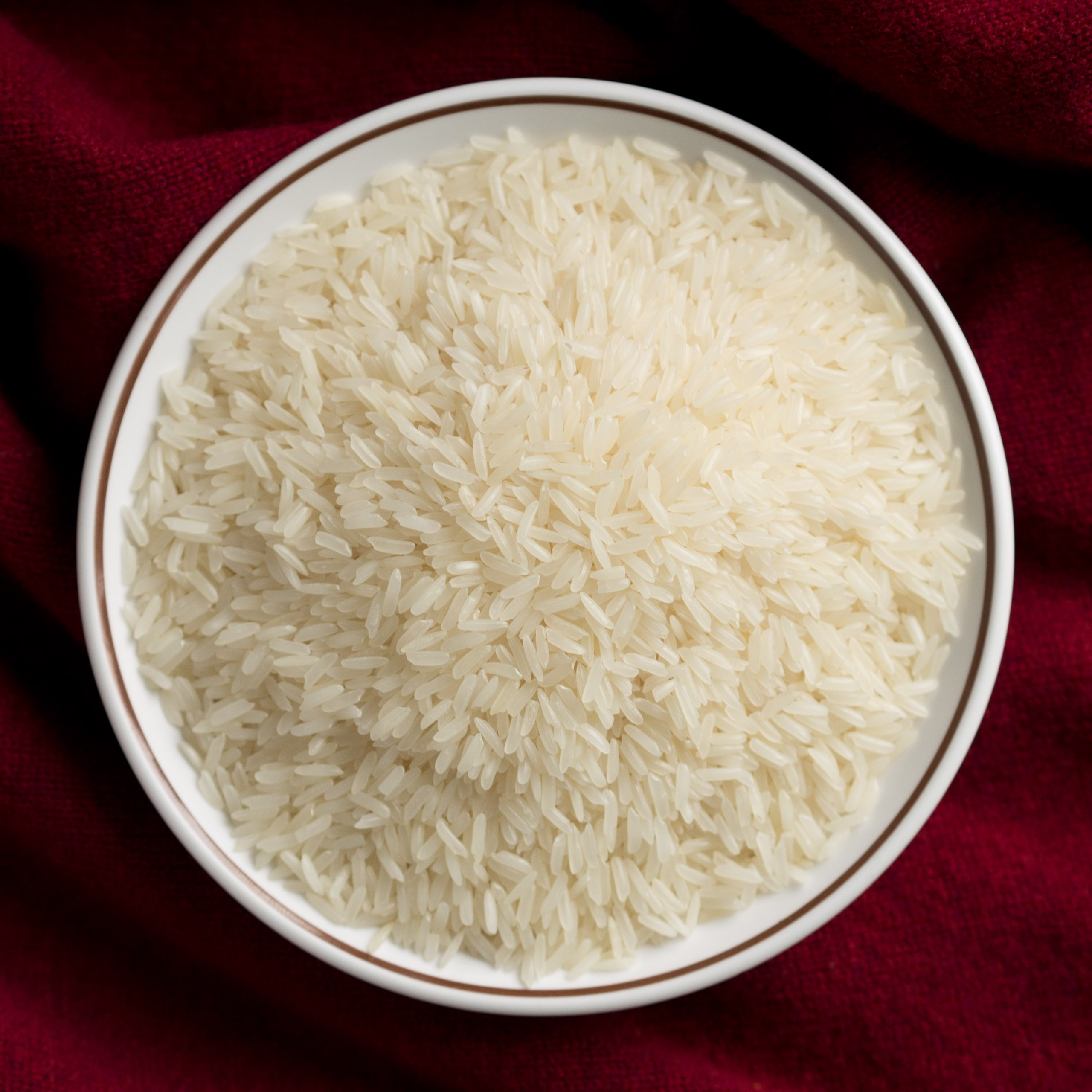
Rice

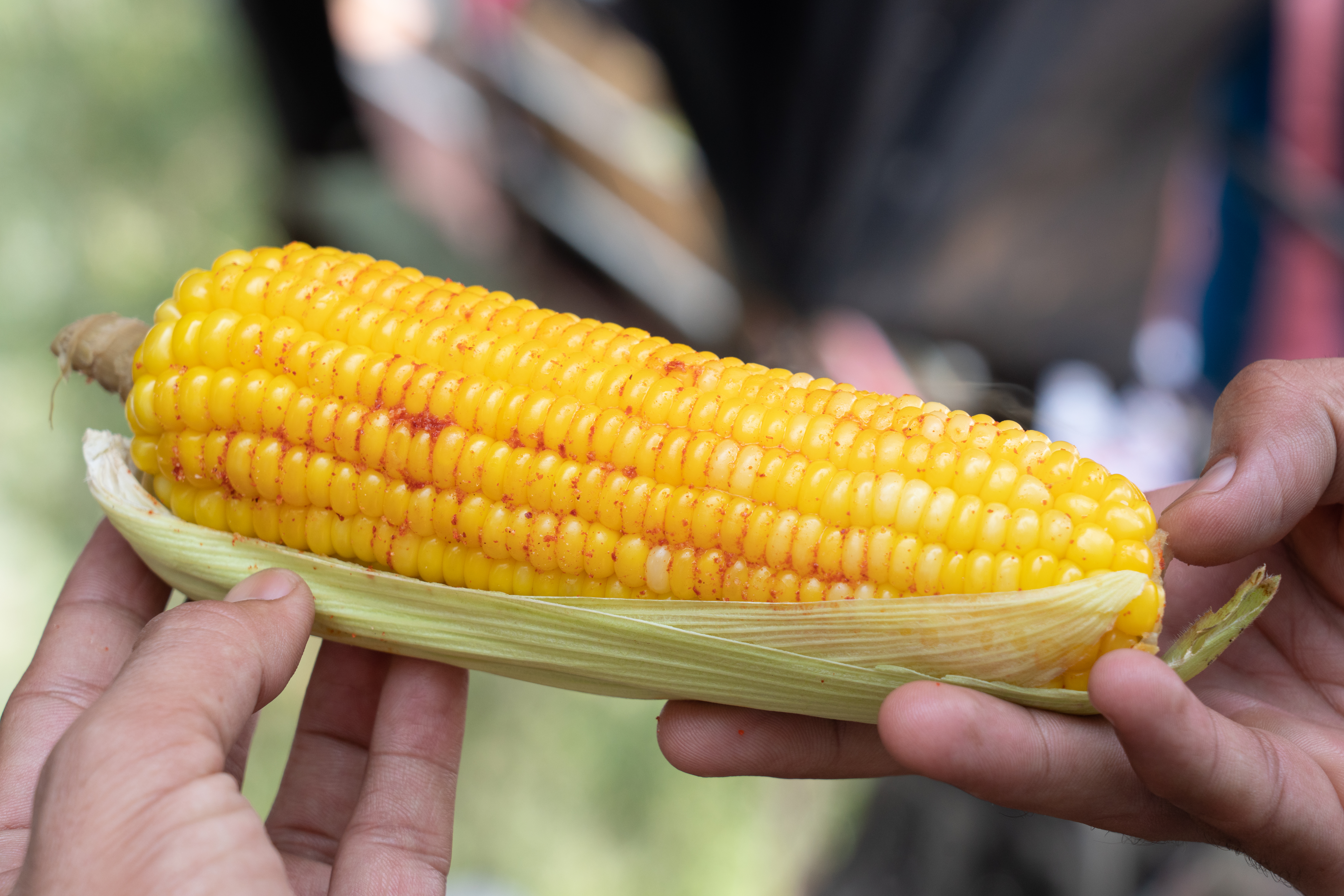
Maize

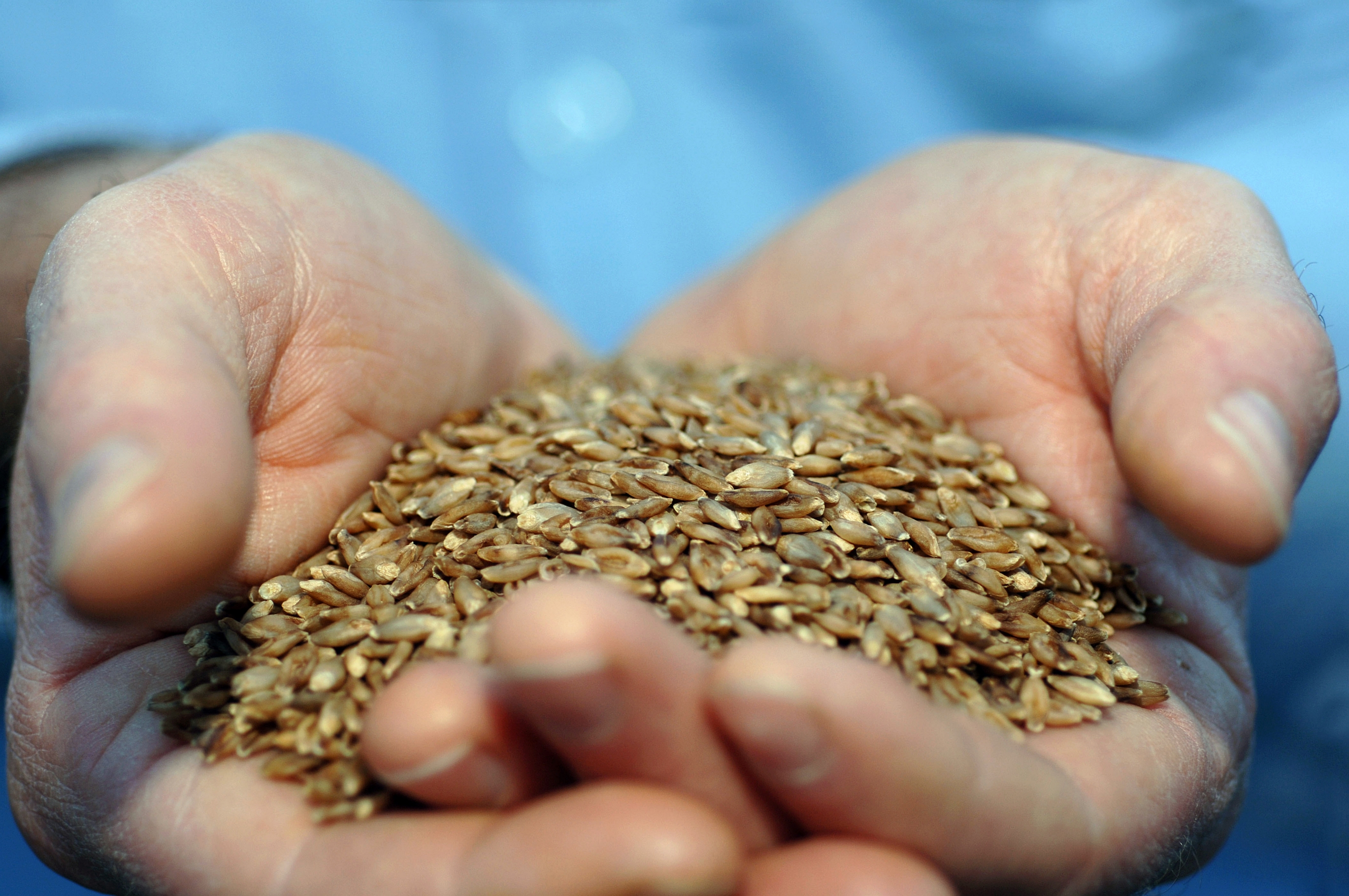
Barley grains

== Prepared foods ==
=== Appetizers ===
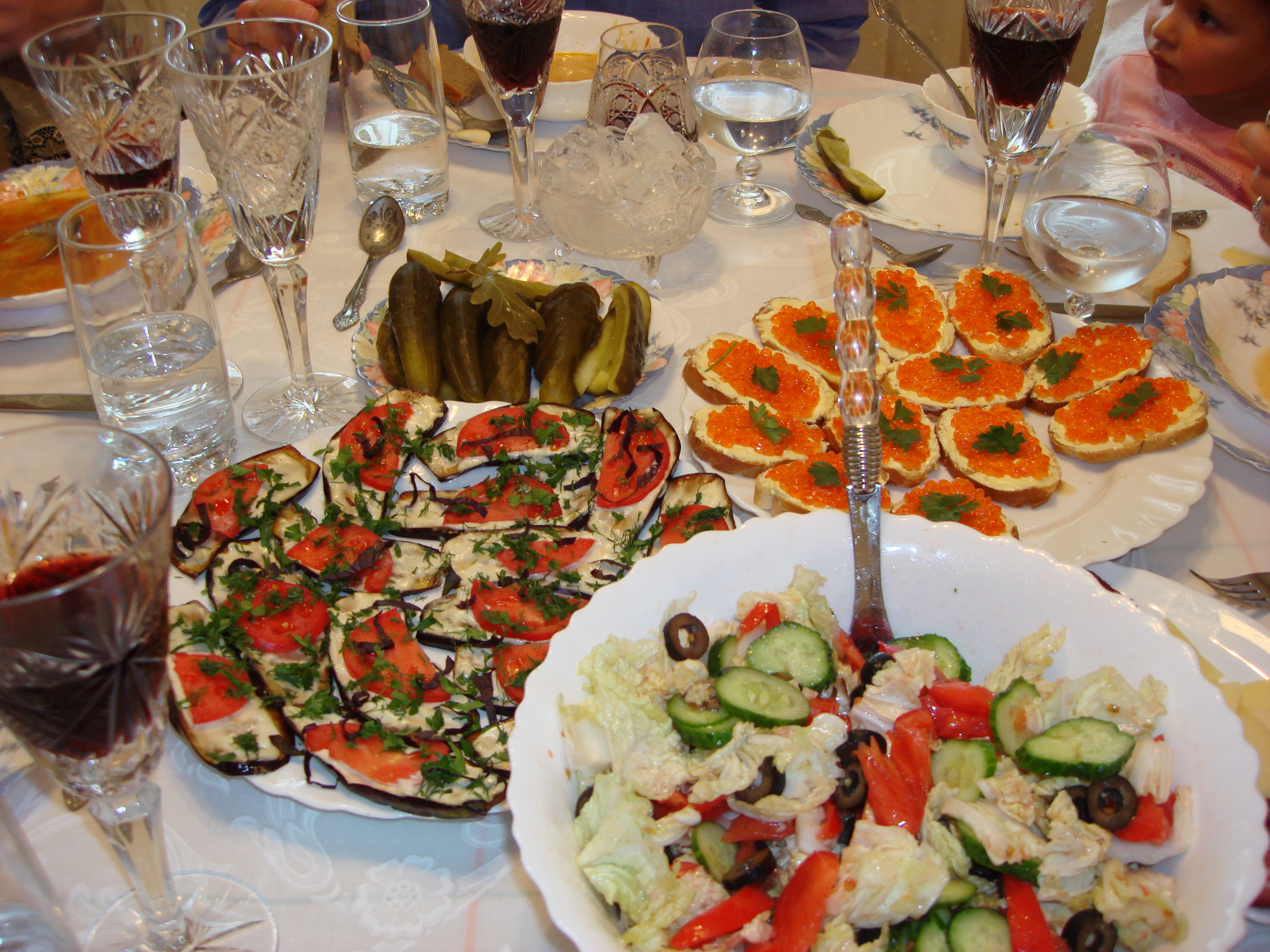
Zakuski are a type of hors d'oeuvre

- Appetizers (also known as hors d'oeuvre) – Items served before the main courses of a meal, typically smaller than main dishes, and often meant to be eaten by hand (with minimal use of silverware). Hors d'oeuvre may be served at the dinner table as a part of the meal, or they may be served before seating. Stationary hors d'oeuvre served at the table may be referred to as "table hors d' oeuvre". Passed hors d'oeuvre may be referred to as "butler-style" or "butlered" hors d'oeuvre.

- List of hors d'oeuvre

=== Condiments ===
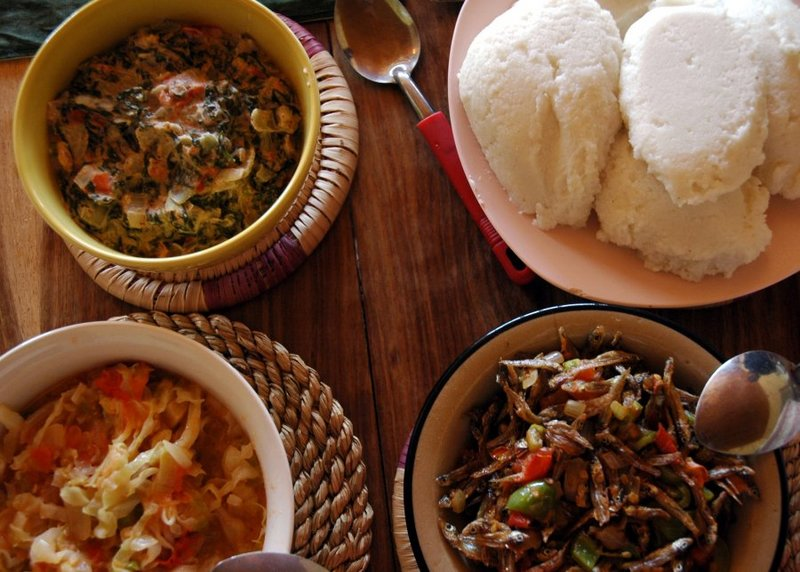
Three condiment relishes here accompany Nshima (top right)

- Condiments – Condiment is something such as a sauce, that is added to some foods to impart a particular flavor, enhance its flavor, or in some cultures, to complement the dish. The term originally described pickled or preserved foods, but has shifted meaning over time.

- List of condiments

- List of brand name condiments

- List of syrups

=== Confectionery ===
- Confectionery – Confectionery, or the making of confections, are food items that are rich in sugar. Confectionery is divided into two broad and somewhat overlapping categories, bakers' confections and sugar confections. Bakers' confectionery includes principally sweet pastries, cakes, and similar baked goods. Sugar confectionery includes sweets, candied nuts, chocolates, chewing gum, sweetmeats, pastillage, and other confections that are made primarily of sugar. Confections include sweet foods, sweetmeats, digestive aids that are sweet, elaborate creations, and something amusing and frivolous.

- List of confectionery brands
- List of chocolate bar brands

- List of bean-to-bar chocolate manufacturers

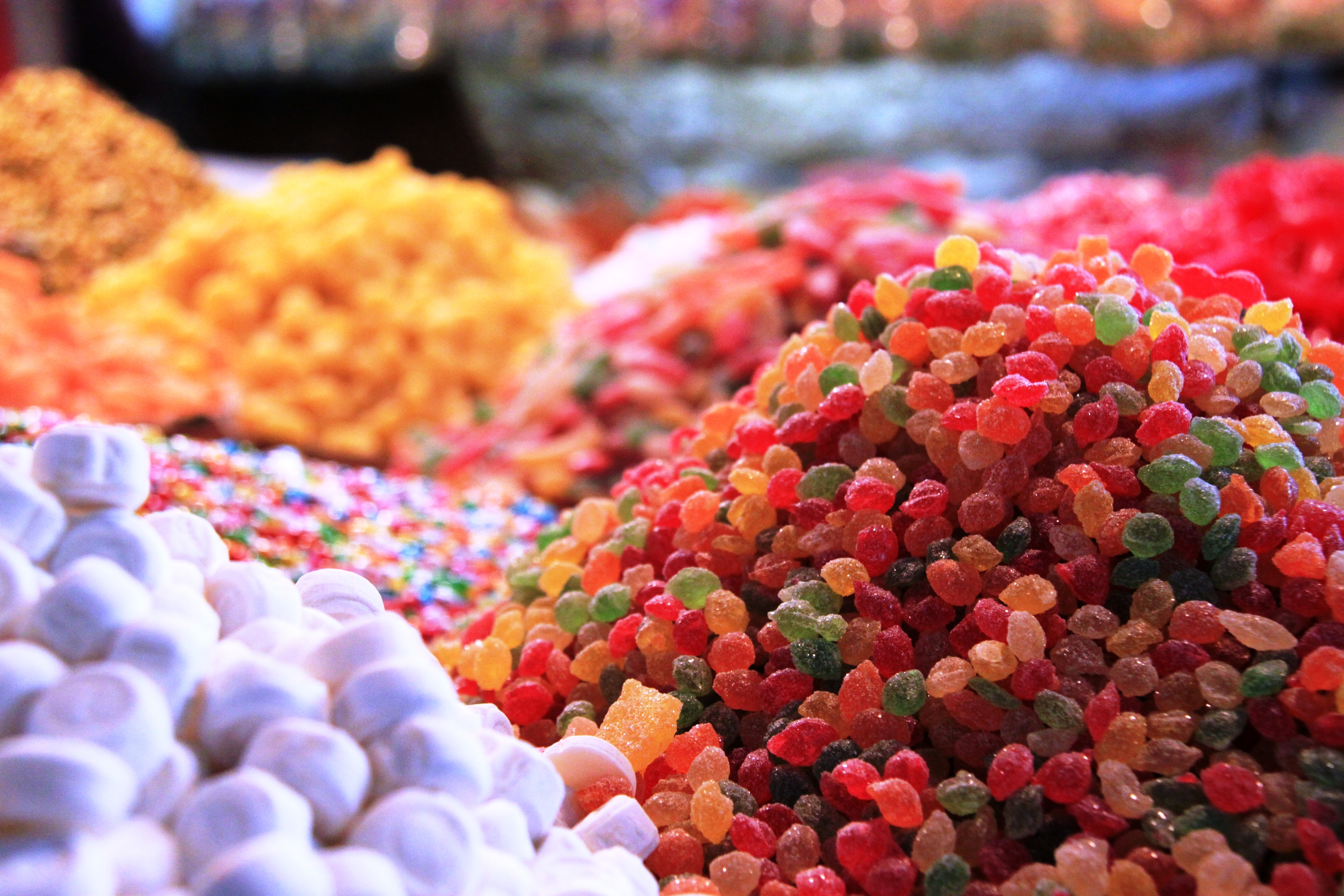
Candy

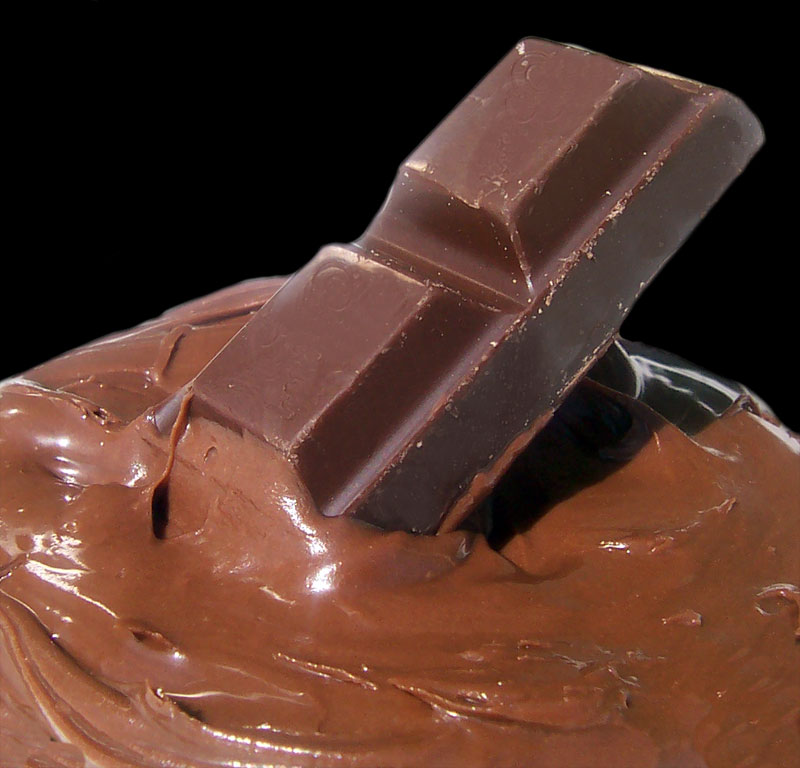
Chocolate

=== Convenience foods ===
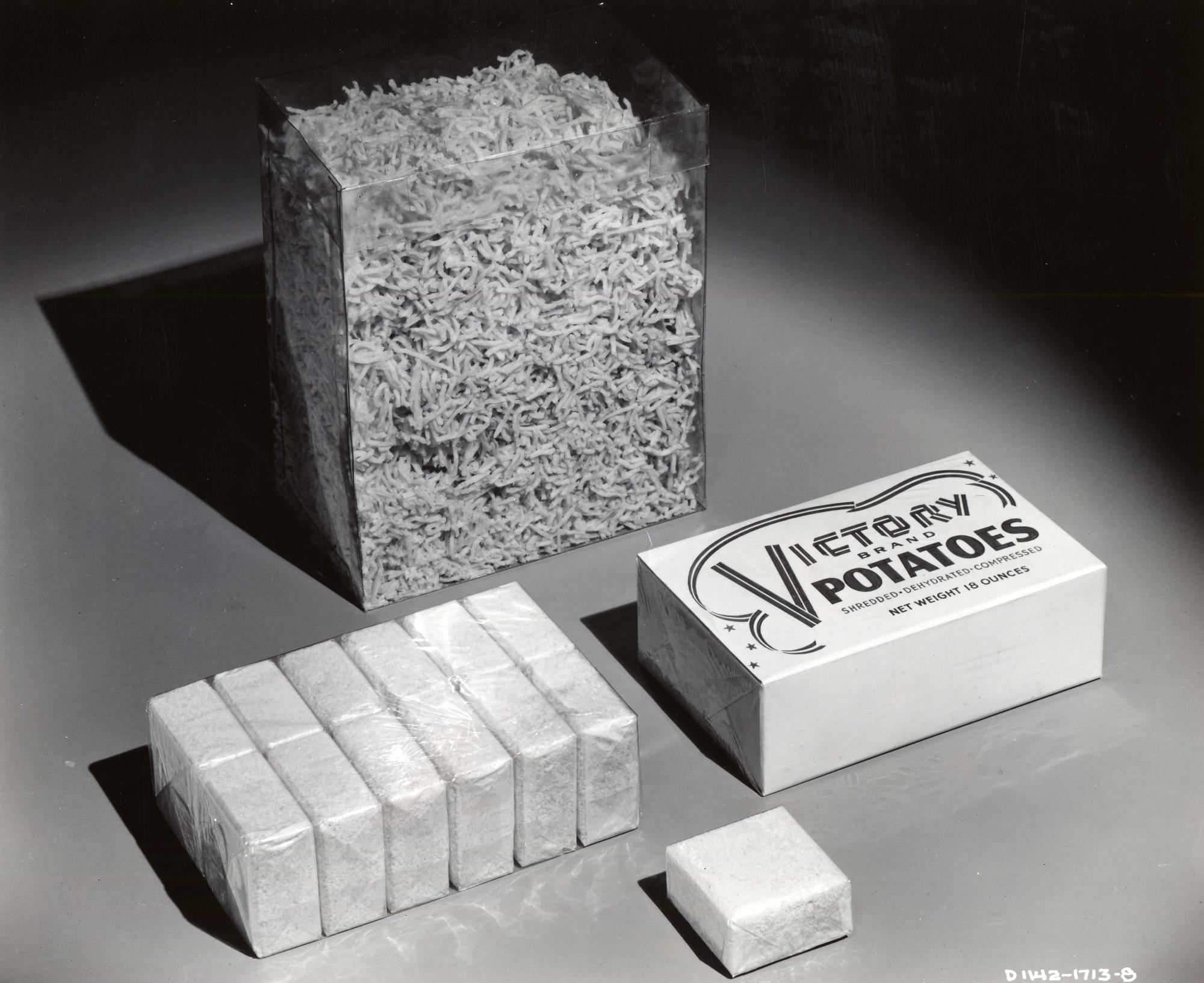
Dehydrated shredded potatoes are a convenience food

- Convenience foods – convenience food, also known as processed food, is commercially prepared food designed for ease of preparation and / or consumption.

=== Desserts ===
- Desserts – Dessert is a typically sweet course that may conclude a meal.

- List of desserts

- Dessert-related lists (category)

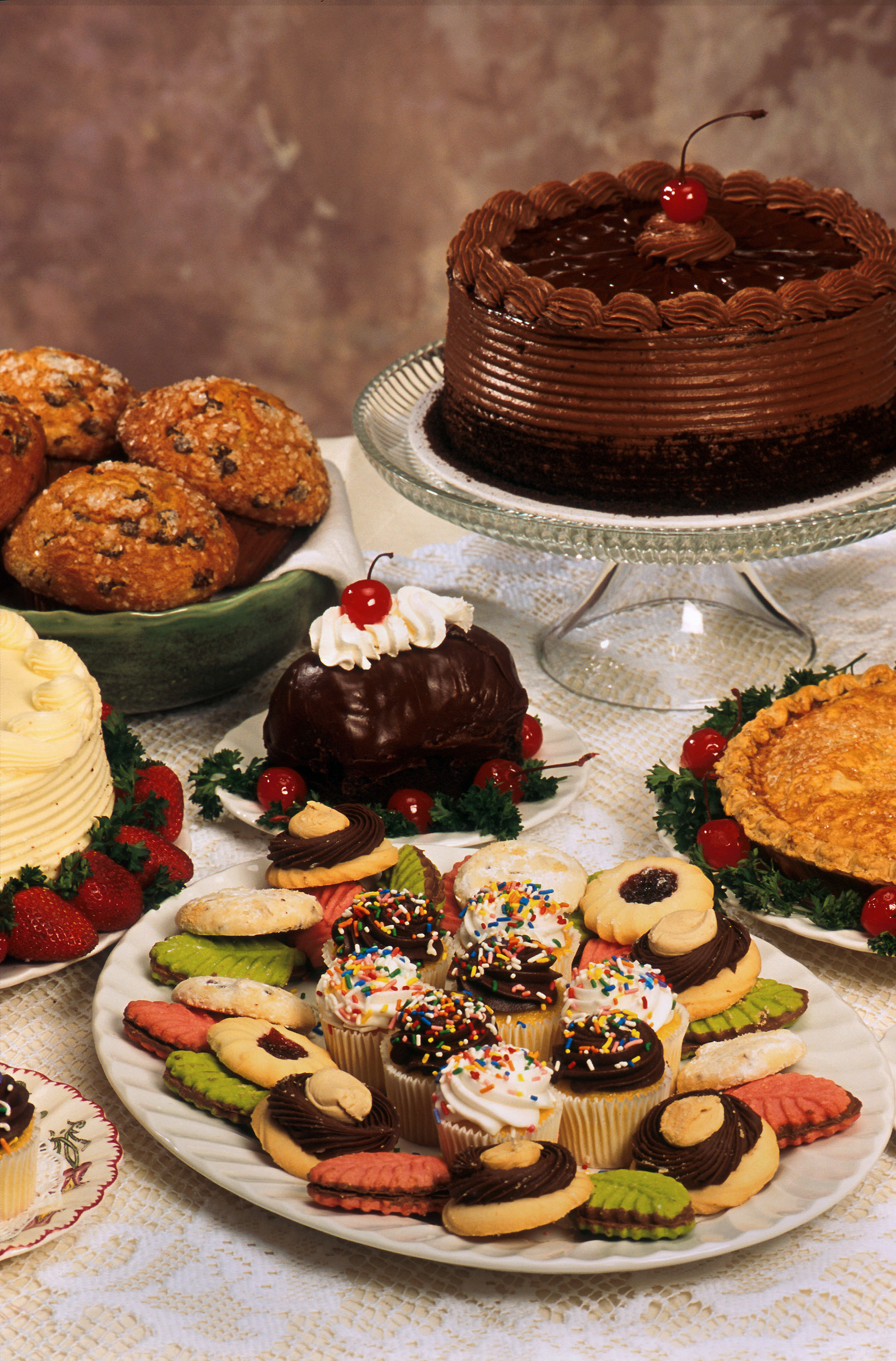
An assortment of desserts

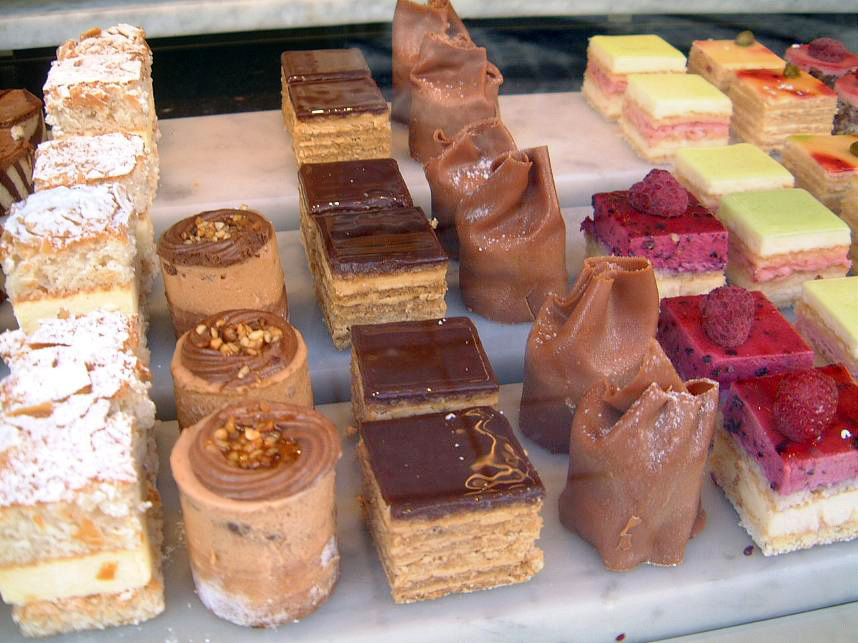
An assortment of petit fours

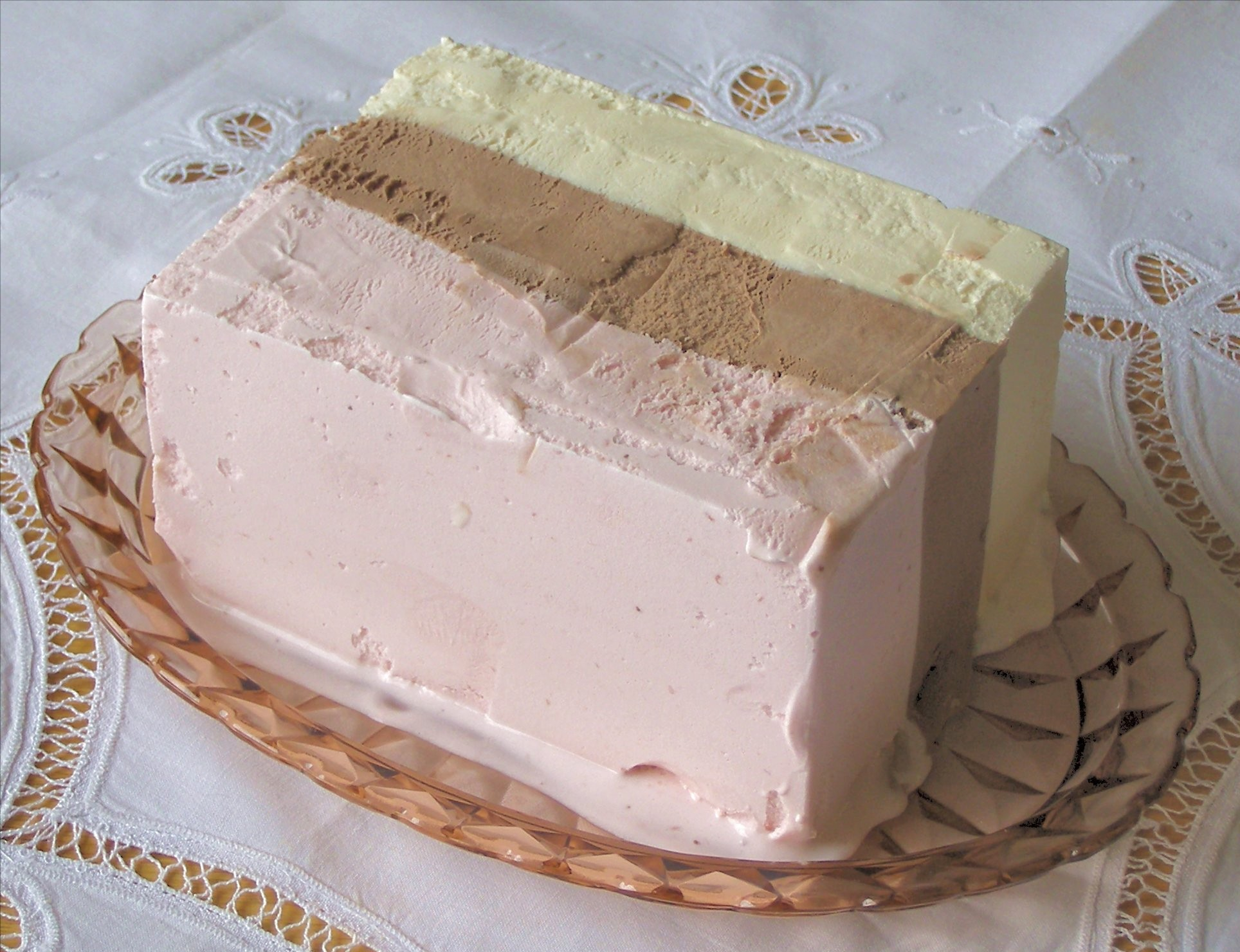
Neapolitan ice cream

=== Dips, pastes and spreads ===
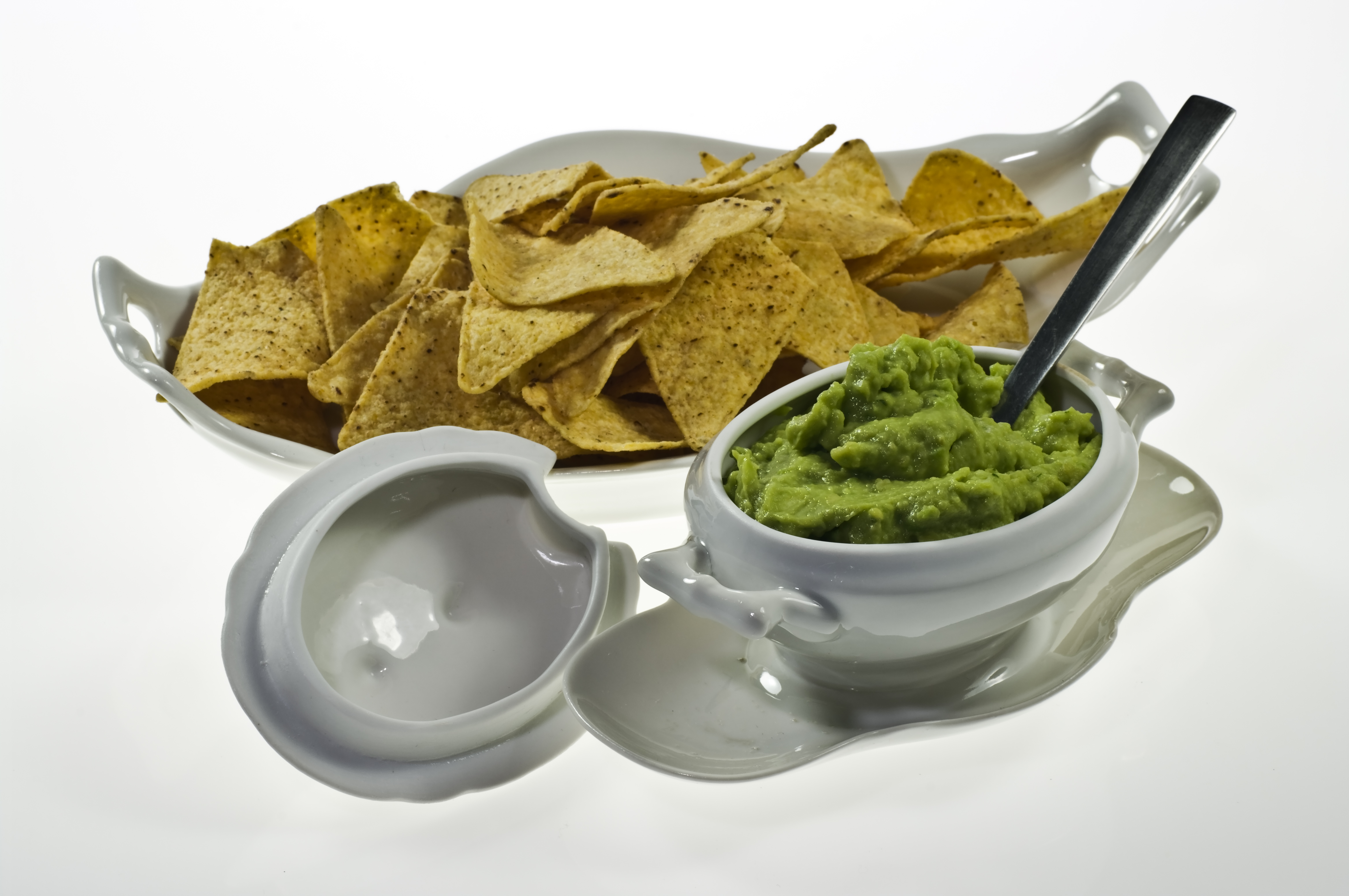
Guacamole is an avocado-based dip

- Dips – Dip or dipping sauce is any condiment for another kind of food. Dips are used to add flavor, texture or both, to a food.

- List of common dips

- Paste – Food paste is a semi-liquid colloidal suspension, emulsion, or aggregation used in food preparation or eaten directly as a spread. Pastes are often highly spicy or aromatic.

- List of food pastes

- Spread – Foods that are literally spread, generally with a knife, onto bread, crackers, or other food products. Spreads are added to food to provide flavor and texture.

- List of spreads

=== Dried foods ===
- Dried foods – Drying is a method of food preservation that removes water from the food, which inhibits the growth of bacteria and has been practiced worldwide since ancient times to preserve food. Where or when dehydration as a food preservation technique was invented has been lost to time, however the earliest known practice of food drying is 12,000 BCE by inhabitants of the modern Middle East and Asia regions.

- List of dried foods

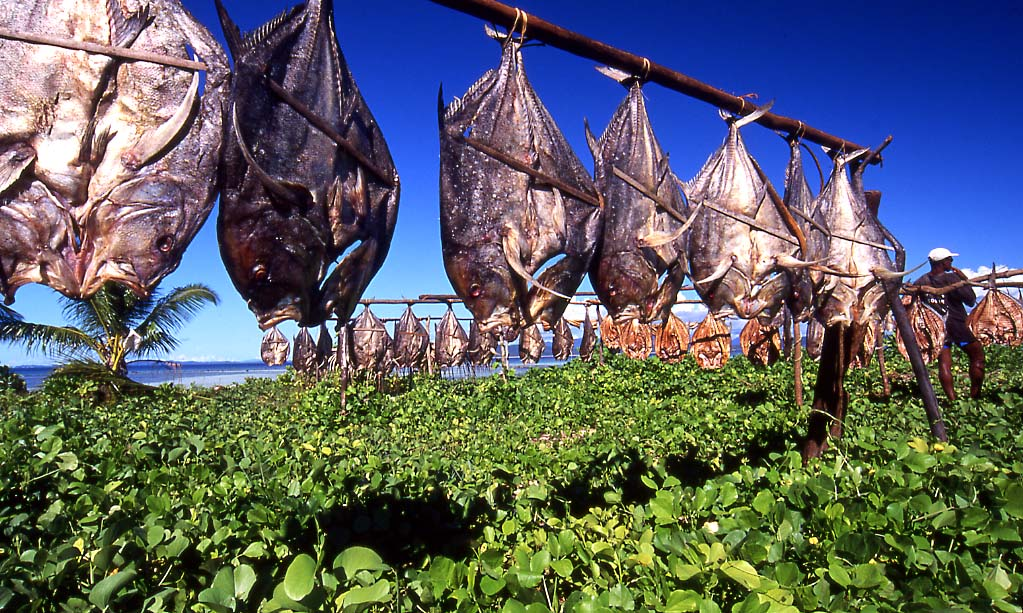
Flattened fish being dried in the sun

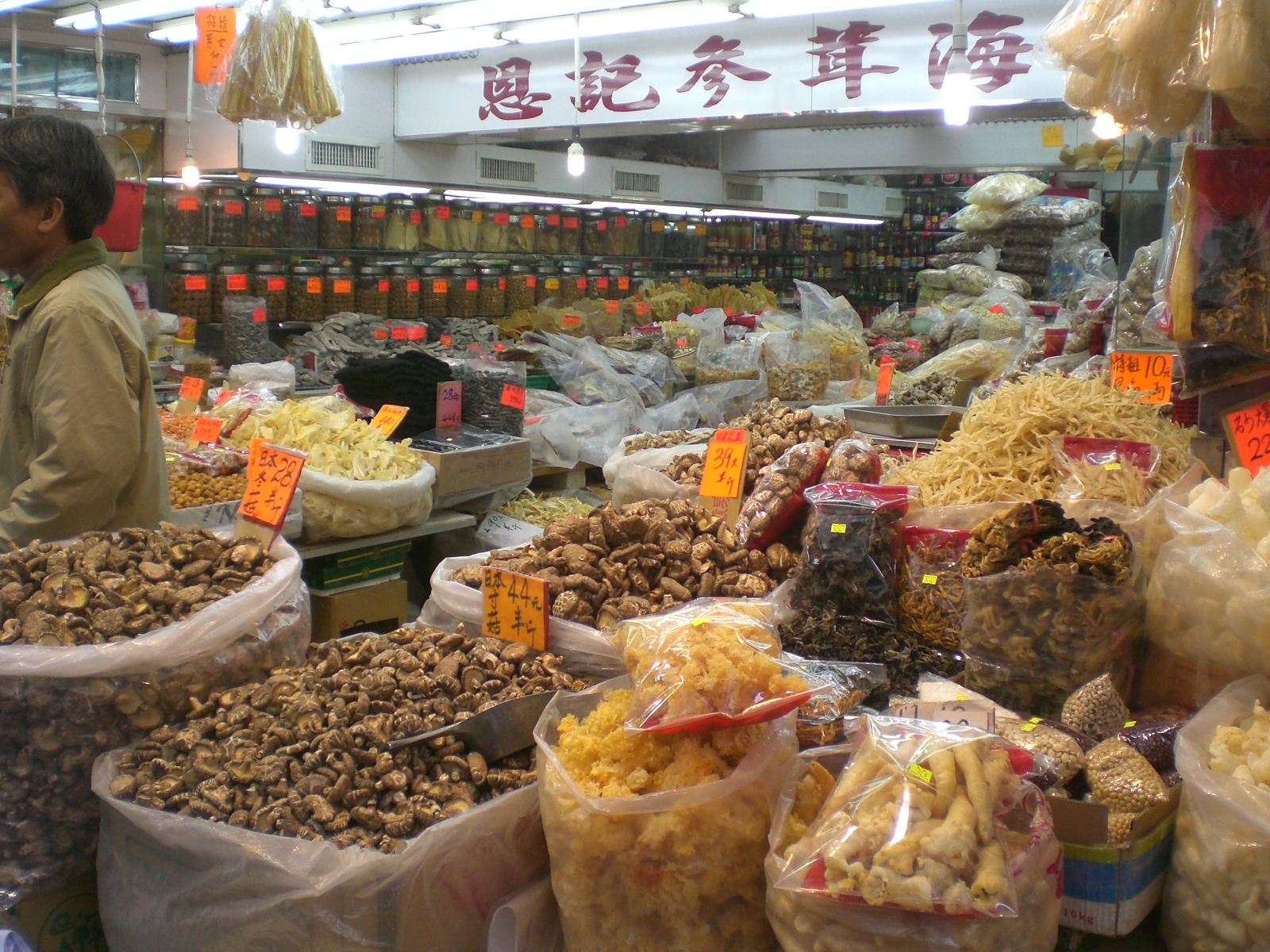
Various dried foods in a dried foods store

=== Dumplings ===
- Dumplings – Dumplings are cooked balls of dough. They are based on flour, potatoes or bread, and may include meat, fish, vegetables, or sweets. They may be cooked by boiling, steaming, simmering, frying, or baking. Dumplings are stuffed with a diverse variety of fillings.

- List of dumplings

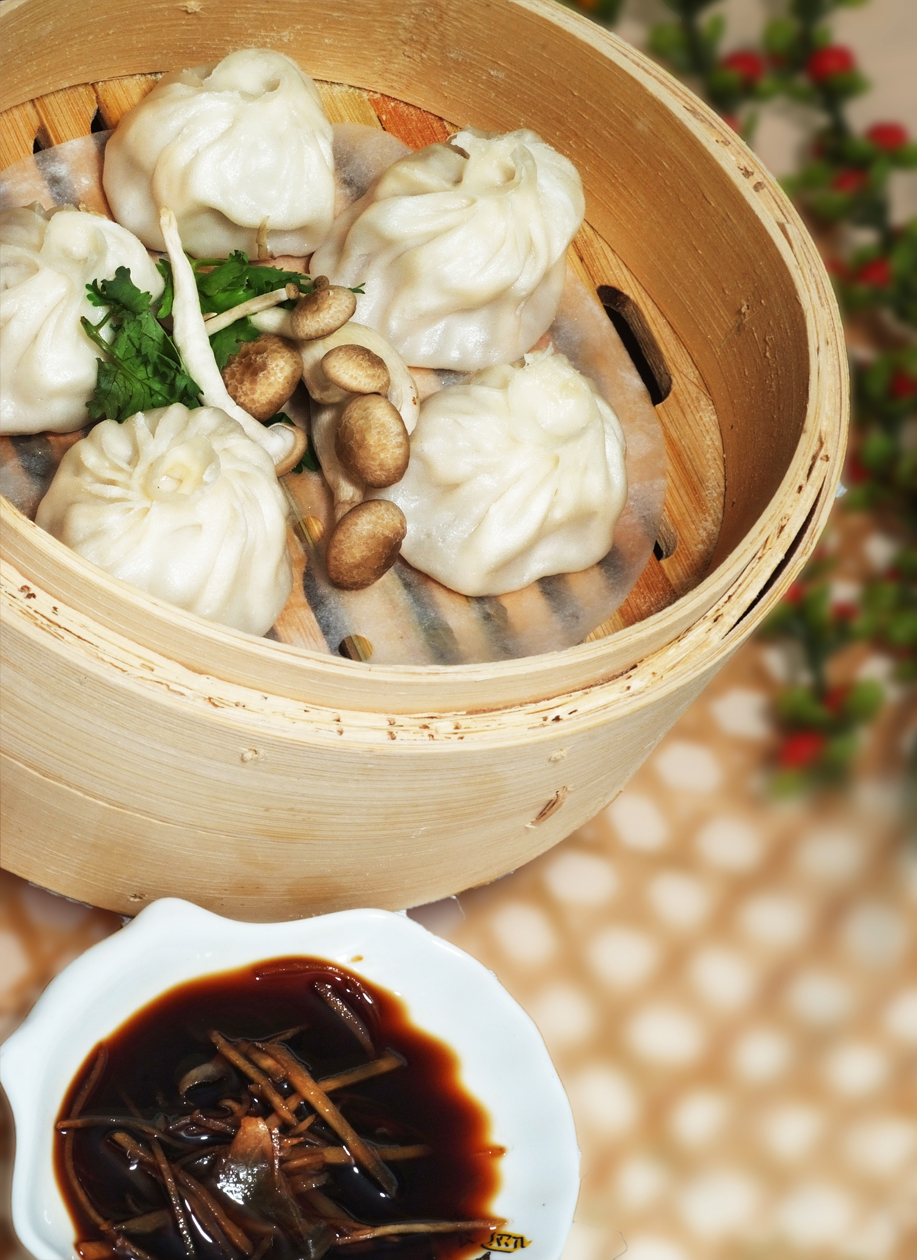
Dumplings in a basket, served with a dipping sauce

=== Fast food ===
- Fast food – Fast food is the term given to food that is prepared and served very quickly, first popularized in the 1950s in the United States. While any meal with low preparation time can be considered fast food, typically the term refers to food sold in a restaurant or store with preheated or precooked ingredients, and served to the customer in a packaged form for take-out/take-away. Fast food restaurants are traditionally separated by their ability to serve food via a drive-through. The term "fast food" was recognized in a dictionary by Merriam–Webster in 1951.
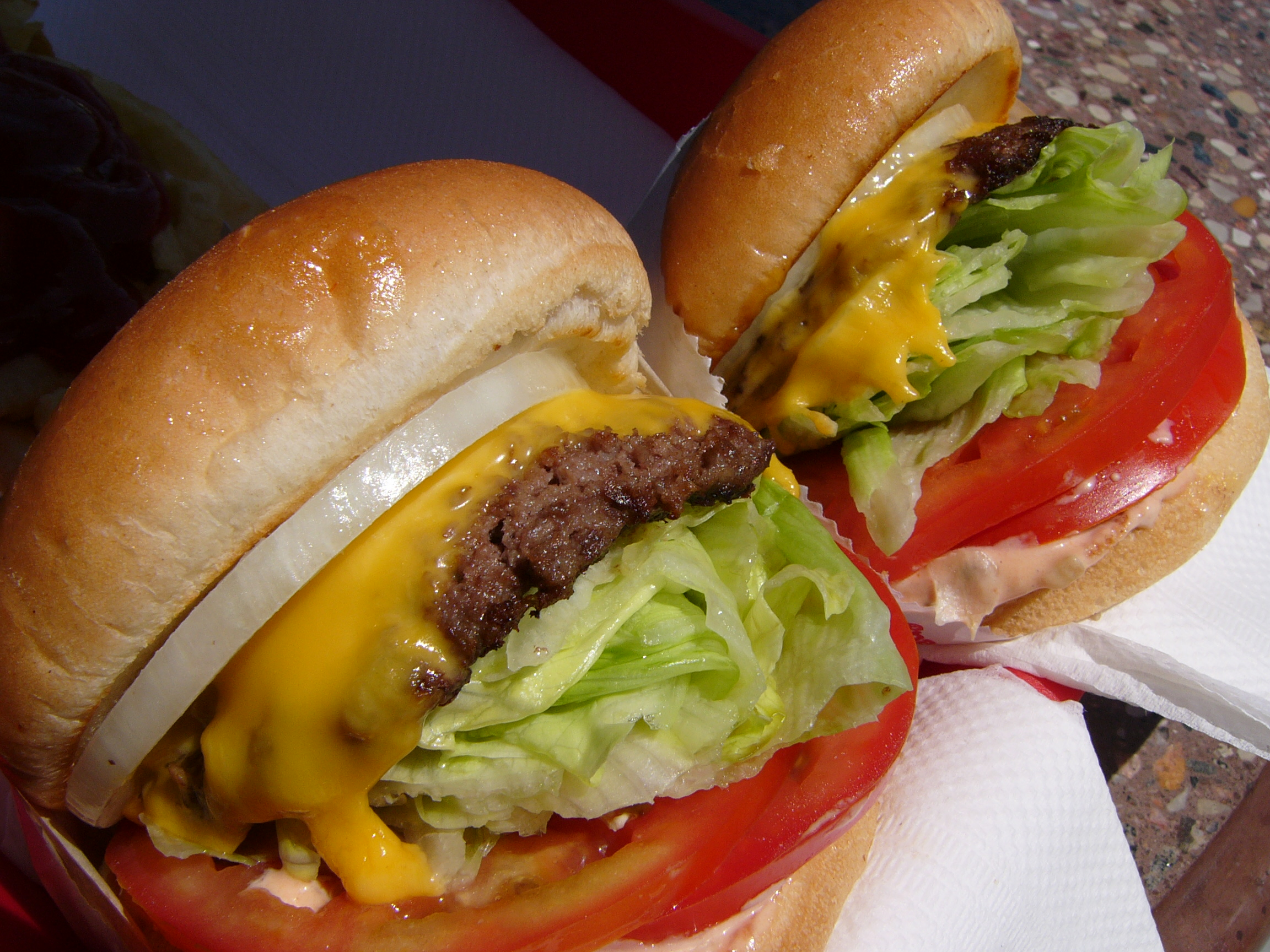
Fast food cheeseburgers

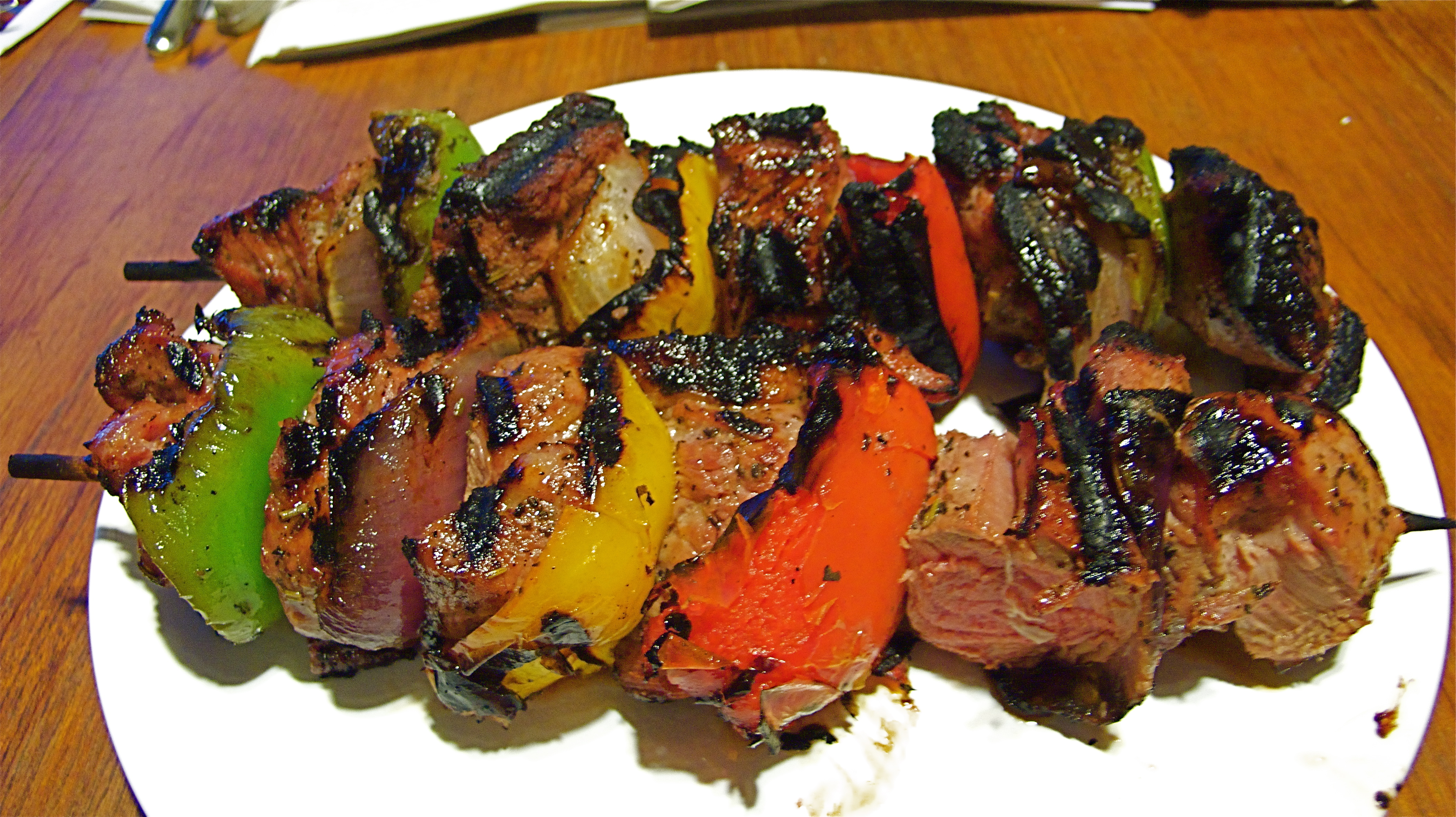
Lamb shish kebab

=== Fermented foods ===
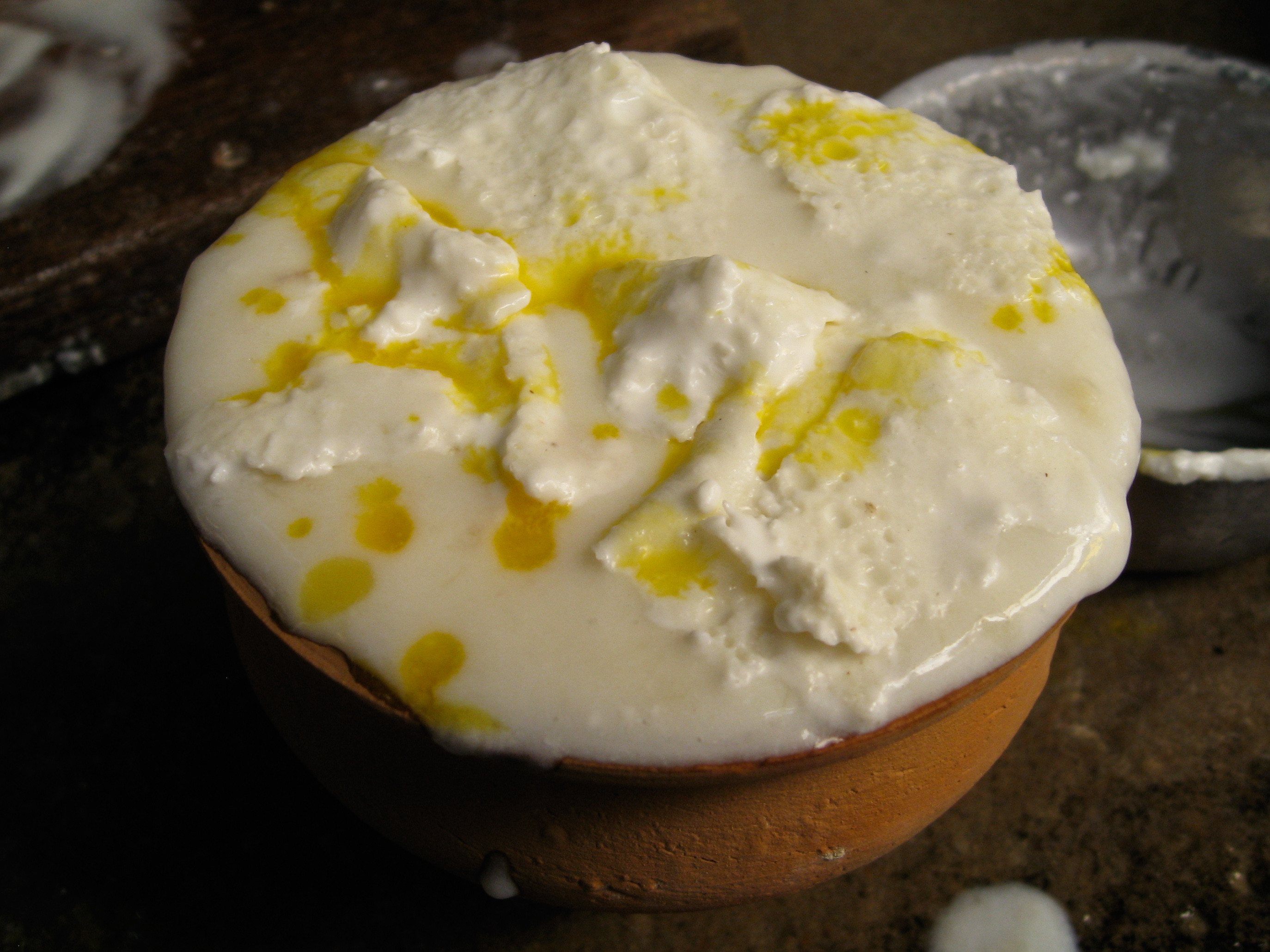
Lassi is a fermented food prepared from yogurt, water and mango pulp

- Fermented foods (Fermentation in food processing) – Fermentation in food processing is the conversion of carbohydrates to alcohols and carbon dioxide or organic acids using yeasts, bacteria, or a combination thereof, under anaerobic conditions. Fermentation usually implies that the action of microorganisms is desirable. The science of fermentation is also known as zymology or zymurgy.

- List of fermented foods

=== Halal food ===
- Halal food – Islamic jurisprudence vis-à-vis Islamic dietary laws specifies which foods are halal ("lawful") and which are ḥarām ("unlawful"). This is derived from commandments found in the Qur'an, the holy book of Islam, as well as the Hadith and Sunnah, libraries cataloging things Muhammad is reported to have said and done.

- List of halal and kosher fish

=== Kosher food ===
- Kosher food – Kosher foods are those that conform to the regulations of kashrut (Jewish dietary law). Food that may be consumed according to halakha (Jewish law) is termed kosher in English, from the Ashkenazi pronunciation of the Hebrew term kashér, meaning "fit" (in this context, fit for consumption). Food that is not in accordance with Jewish law is called treif or treyf, derived from Hebrew trāfáh. Some of the restrictions include not being able to eat seafood. One also can not mix meat with dairy. Pork also can not be eaten. But there are those in the Jewish community that do not actually keep Kosher.

=== Noodles ===
- Noodles – The noodle is a type of staple food made from some type of unleavened dough which is rolled flat and cut into one of a variety of shapes. While long, thin strips may be the most common, many varieties of noodles are cut into waves, helices, tubes, strings, or shells, or folded over, or cut into other shapes. Noodles are usually cooked in boiling water, sometimes with cooking oil or salt added. They are often pan-fried or deep-fried. Noodles are often served with an accompanying sauce or in a soup. Noodles can be refrigerated for short-term storage, or dried and stored for future use.

- List of pasta
- List of pasta dishes
- List of noodles
- List of noodle dishes

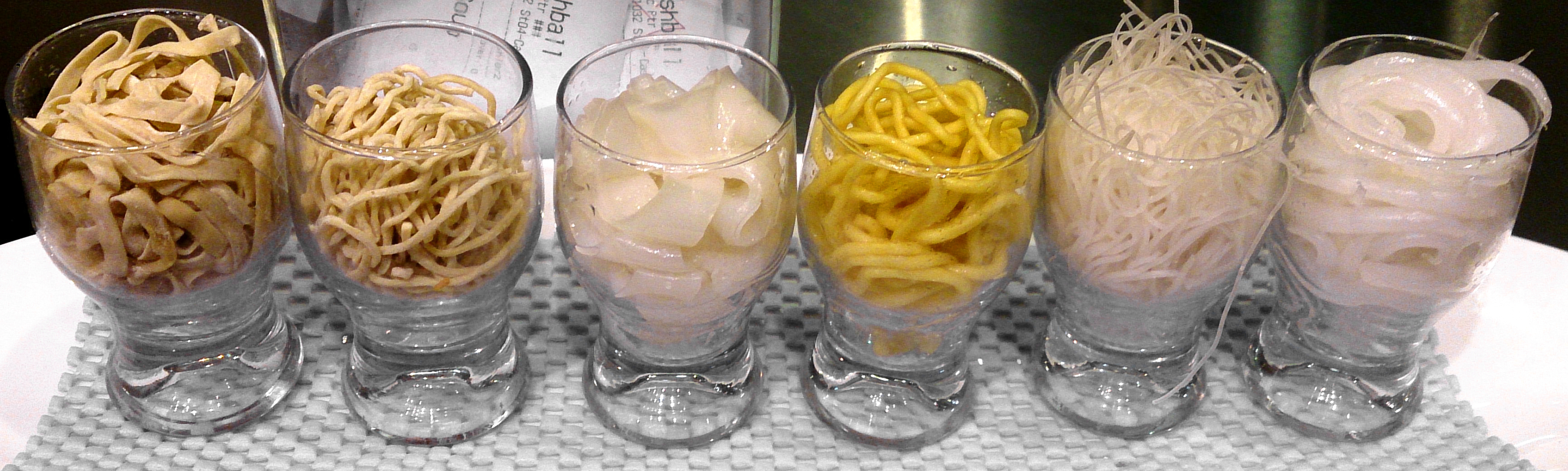
Various types of noodles commonly found in Southeast Asia

=== Pies ===
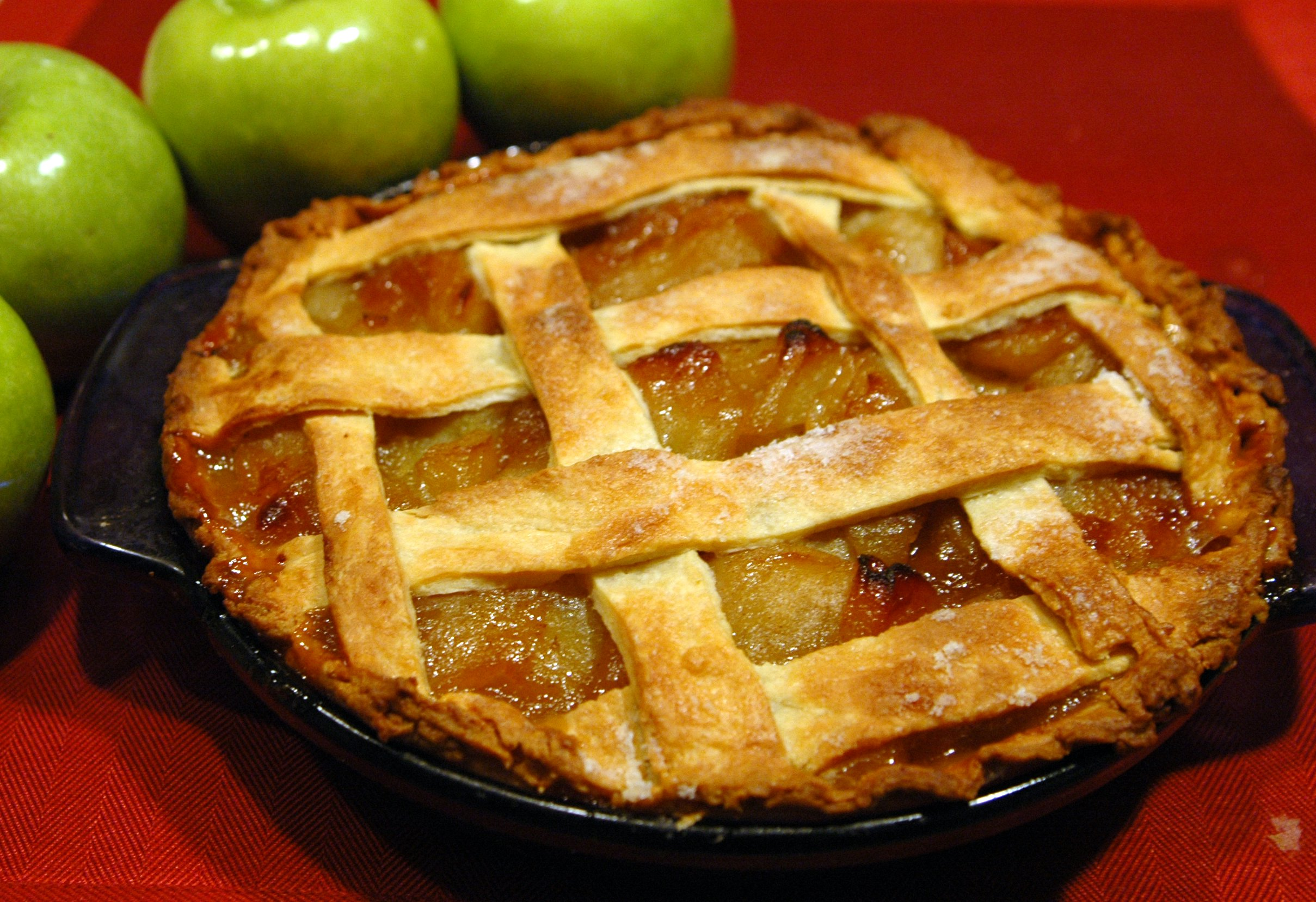
An apple pie

- Pies – Pie is a baked dish which is usually made of a pastry dough casing that covers or completely contains a filling of various sweet or savoury ingredients.

- List of pies, tarts and flans

=== Salads ===
- Salads – Salad is a ready-to-eat dish often containing leafy vegetables, usually served chilled or at a moderate temperature and often served with a sauce or dressing. Salads may also contain ingredients such as fruit, grain, meat, seafood and sweets. Though many salads use raw ingredients, some use cooked ingredients.

- List of salads

=== Sandwiches ===
- Sandwiches – Sandwich is a food item consisting of one or more types of food placed on or between slices of bread, or more generally any dish wherein two or more pieces of bread serve as a container or wrapper for some other food. The sandwich was originally a portable food item or finger food which began its popularity primarily in the Western World, but is now found in various versions in numerous countries worldwide.

- List of sandwiches

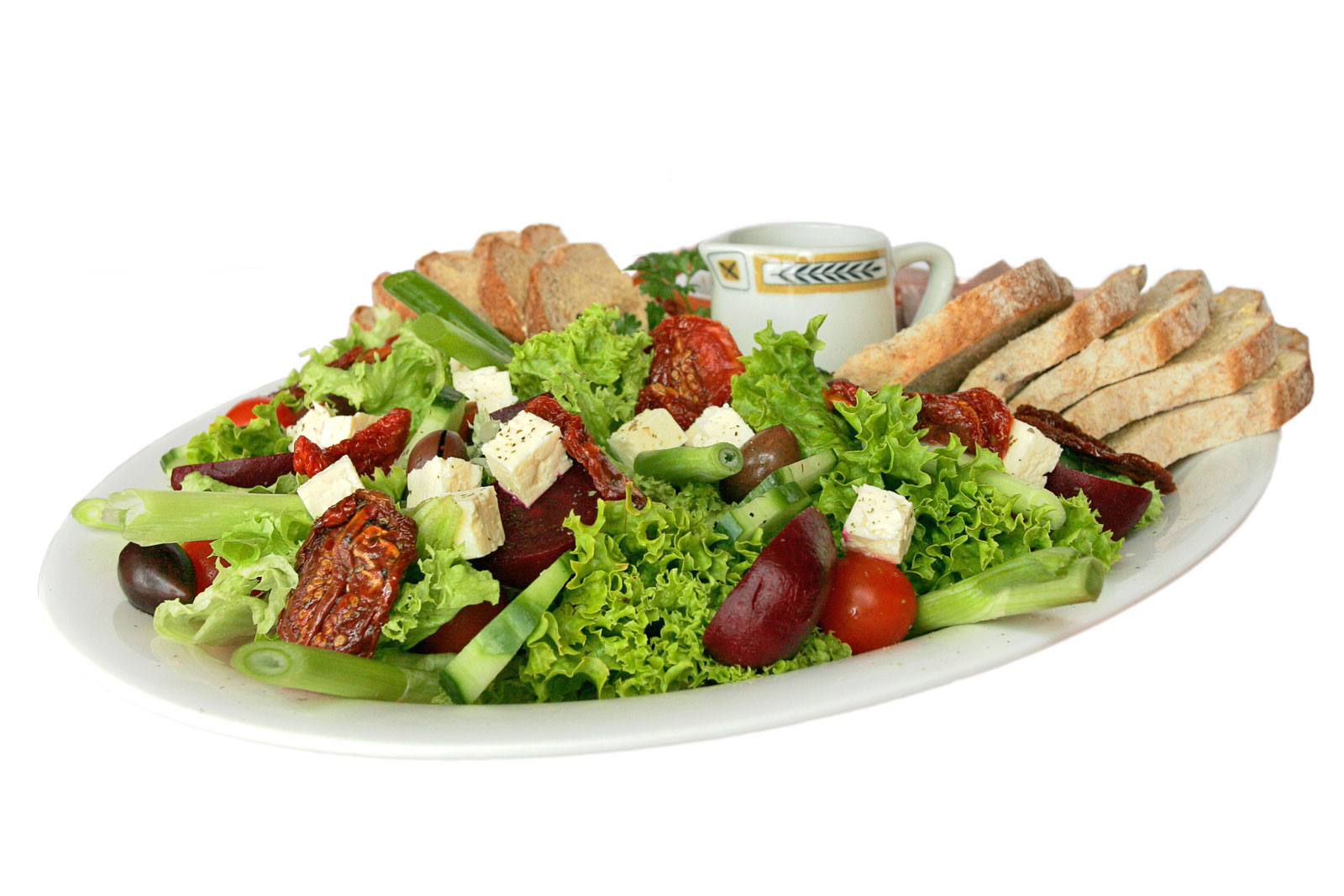
A salad platter

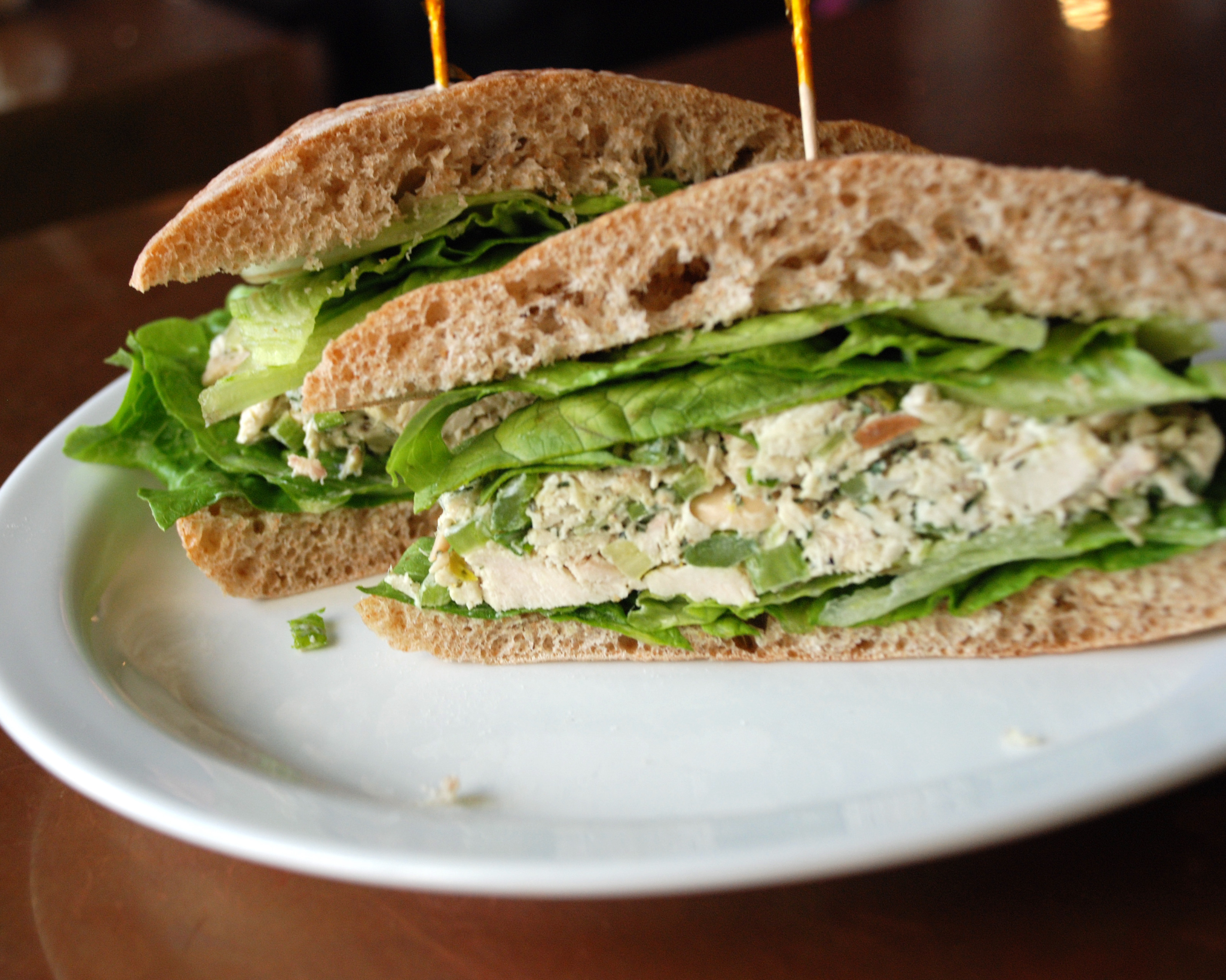
A sandwich prepared with chicken salad

=== Sauces ===
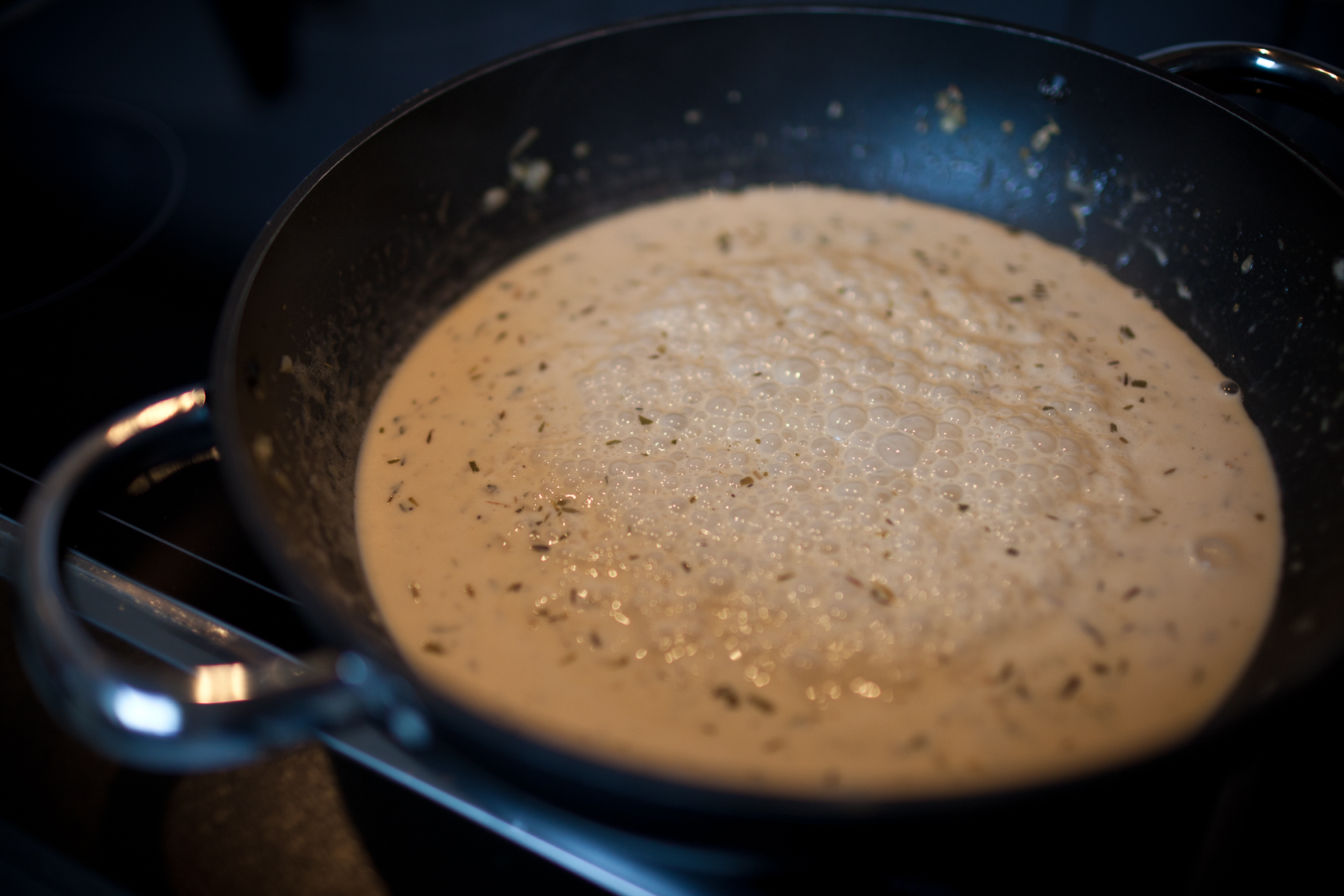
Sauce poivrade being prepared, one of many types of sauces

- Sauces – In cooking, a sauce is liquid, cream or semi-solid food served on or used in preparing other foods. Sauces are not normally consumed by themselves; they add flavor, moisture, and visual appeal to another dish. Sauce is a French word descended from the Latin salsa, meaning salted. Possibly the oldest sauce recorded is garum, the fish sauce used by the Ancient Greeks.

- List of sauces

=== Snack foods ===
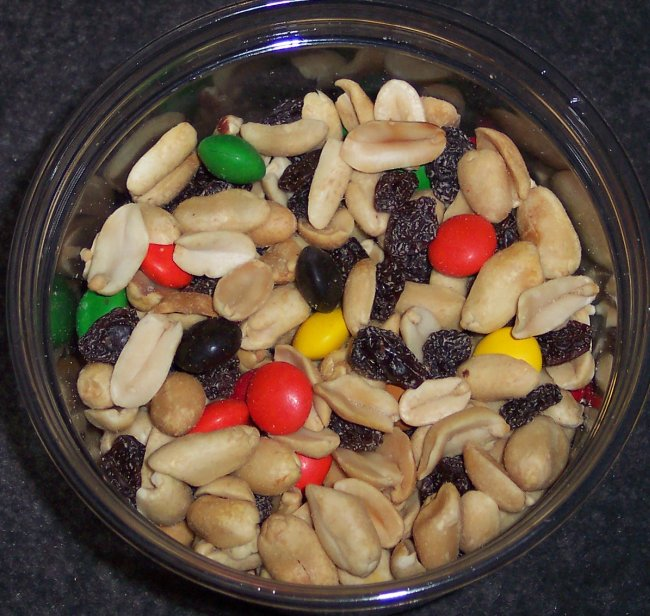
"Gorp" ("good old raisins and peanuts") is a classic trail mix and snack food

- Snack food – Snack food is a portion of food often smaller than a regular meal, generally eaten between meals. Snacks come in a variety of forms including packaged and processed foods and items made from fresh ingredients at home.

- List of snack foods

=== Soups ===
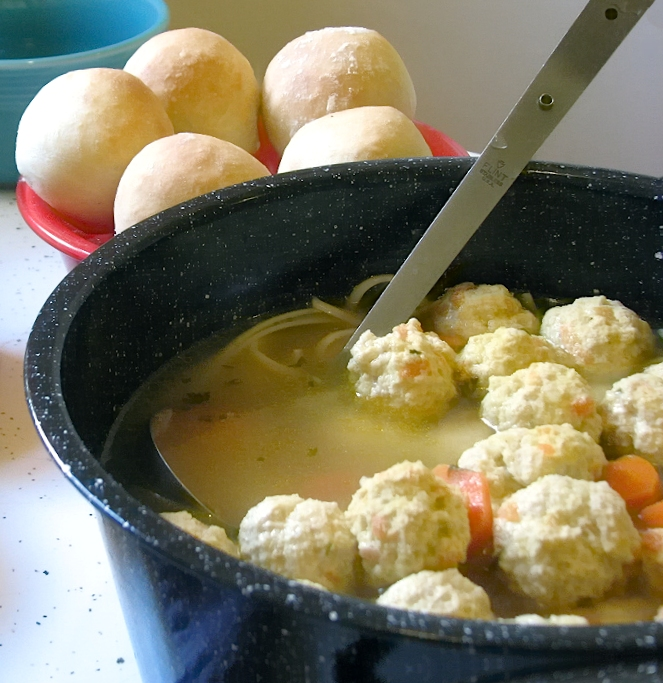
Matzo ball soup

- Soups – Soup is a primarily liquid food, generally served warm (but may be cool or cold), that is made by combining ingredients such as meat and vegetables with stock, juice, water, or another liquid. Hot soups are additionally characterized by boiling solid ingredients in liquids in a pot until the flavors are extracted, forming a broth.

- List of soups

=== Stews ===
- Stews – Stew is a combination of solid food ingredients that have been cooked in liquid and served in the resultant gravy. Ingredients in a stew can include any combination of vegetables (such as carrots, potatoes, beans, peppers and tomatoes, etc.), meat, especially tougher meats suitable for slow-cooking, such as beef. Poultry, sausages, and seafood are also used.

- List of stews

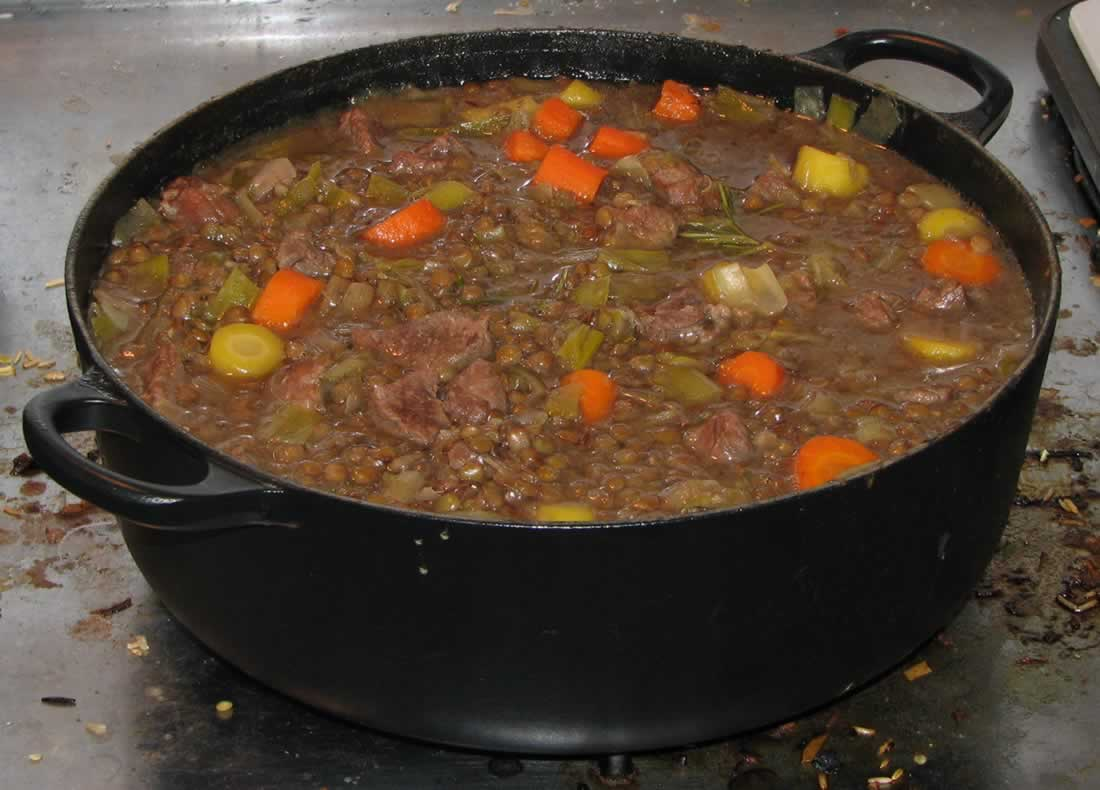
Lamb and lentil stew

== See also ==
Portals

Portal:Food

Portal:Drink

Portal:Beer

Food
Drink
Beer

Portal:Wine

Portal:Liquor

Portal:Coffee

Wine
Liquor
Coffee

Portal:Agriculture and agronomy

Agriculture and agronomy

- Bushfood
- Cuisine
- Dishes by main ingredient (category)
- Edible flower
- Food products (category)
- Foods by cooking technique (category)
- Food products (category)
- List of ancient dishes
- List of antioxidants in food
- List of drinks
- List of culinary herbs and spices
- List of food origins
- Lists of foods (category)
- List of foods with religious symbolism
- List of organic food topics
- List of street foods
- List of baked goods
- Natural food
- Nutrition
- Organic food
- Seasoning
- Outline of food preparation
- Specialty foods
- Taboo food and drink
- Whole food
- Comfort food
- Food
