= List of food pastes =

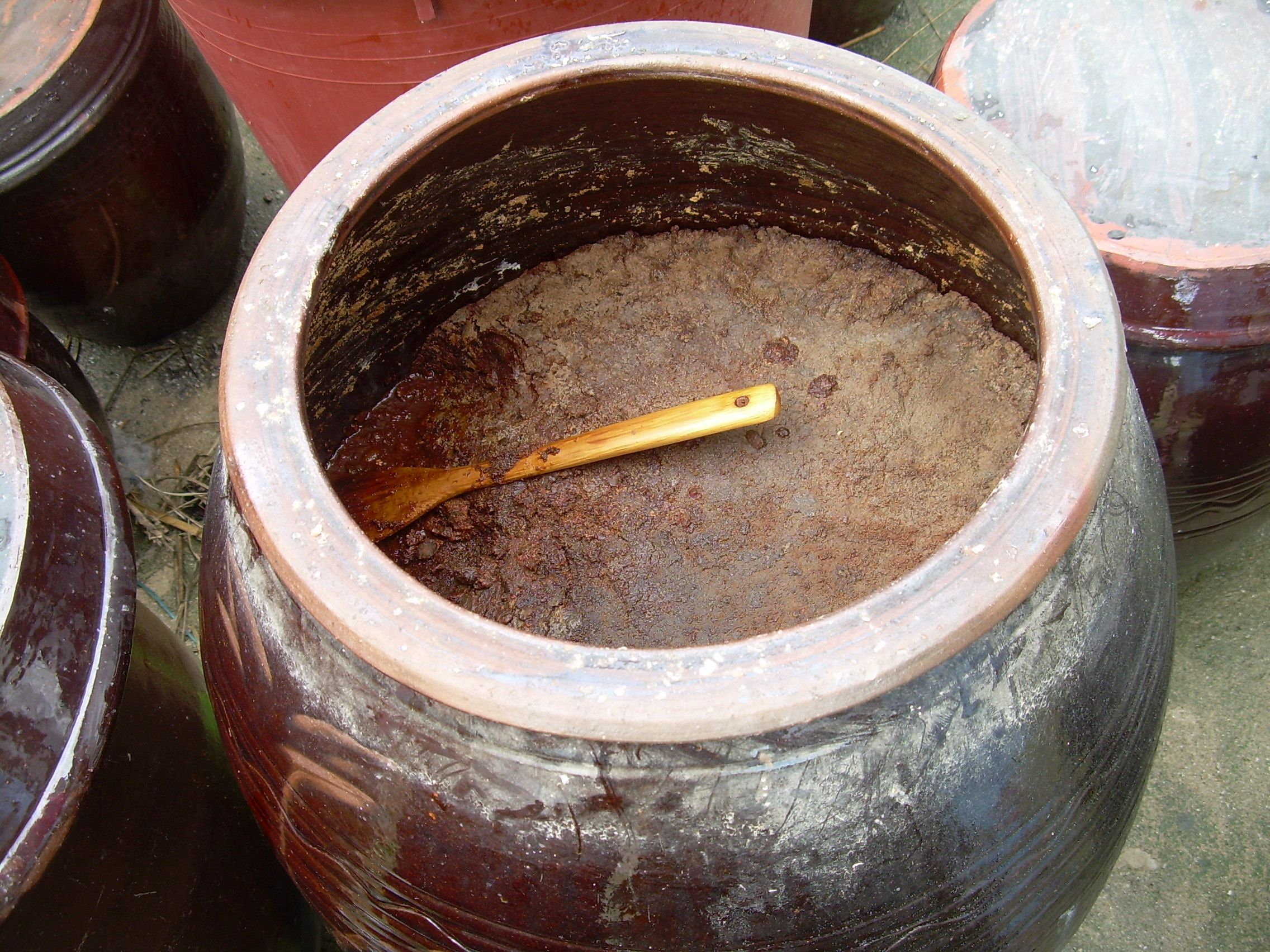
Korean denjang, a fermented bean paste

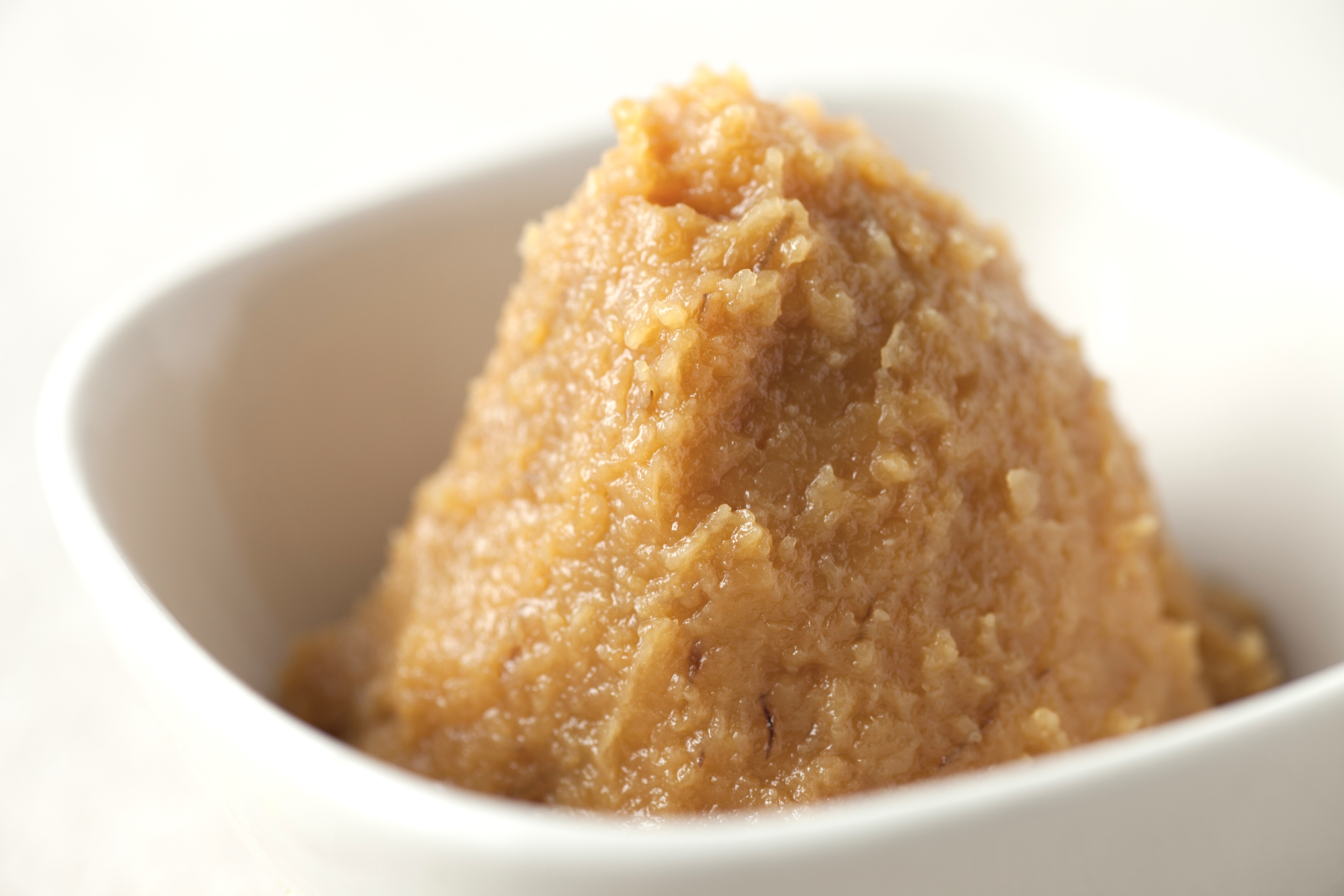
Japanese miso, a fermented bean paste

This is a list of notable food pastes. A food paste is a semi-liquid colloidal suspension, emulsion, or aggregation used in food preparation or eaten directly as a spread. Pastes are often spicy or aromatic, prepared well in advance of actual usage, and are often made into a preserve for future use. Common pastes are curry pastes, fish pastes, some fruit preserves, legume pastes and nut pastes. Purées, however, are food pastes made from already cooked ingredients, as in the case of cauliflower purée, or raw, as in the case of apple purée.

== Food pastes ==
=== Fish and seafood ===
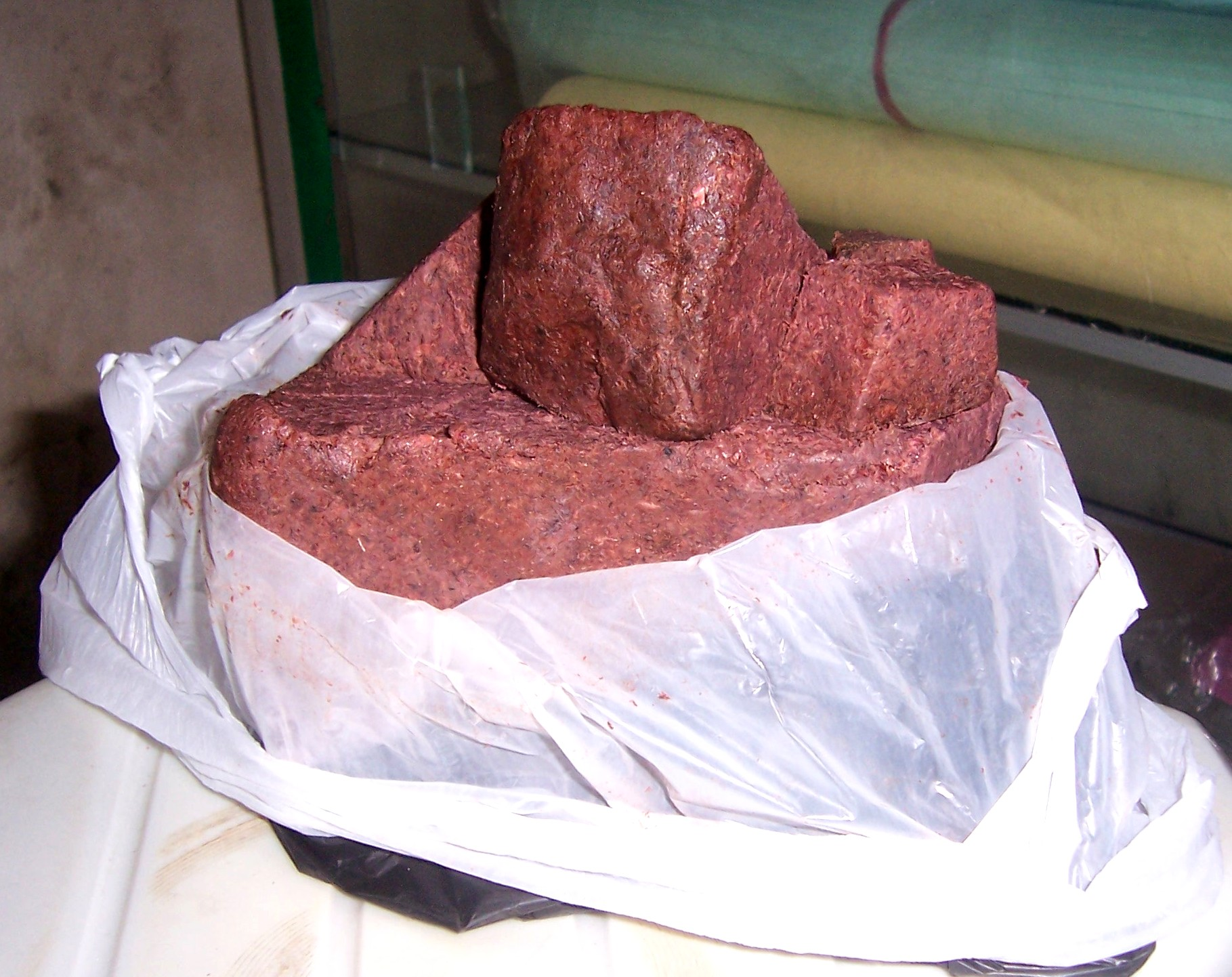
Lengkare shrimp paste in Lombok Island, Indonesia

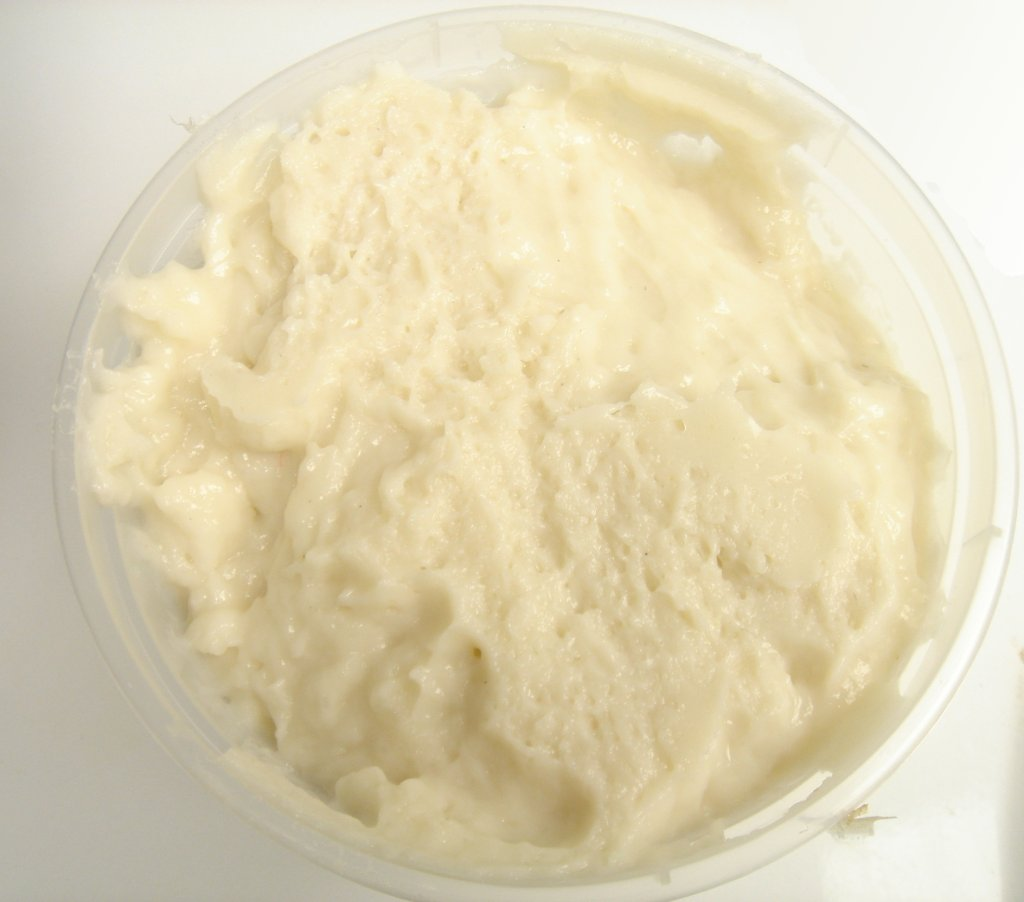
A tub of uncured fish surimi ready for finish-processing

- Fish paste – prepared from fish parts through fermentation

- Anchovy paste

- Gentleman's Relish

- Muria – concentrated garum (fermented fish sauce) evaporated down to a thick paste with salt crystals was called muria; it would have been rich in protein, amino acids, minerals and B vitamins.
- Jakoten
- Ngapi – Seafood paste used in Burmese cuisine
- Pissalat – French condiment made from anchovies
- Prahok – Cambodian salted and fermented fish paste

- Shrimp paste – made from fermented ground shrimp, either from fresh shrimp or dried ones, with the addition of salt. Prepared shrimp paste often has oil, sugar, garlic, chili, and other spices added.

- Saeu-jeot

- Surimi – refers to a paste made from fish or other meat and also refers to a number of Asian foods that use surimi as their primary ingredients

- Kamaboko

=== Fruit and vegetable ===
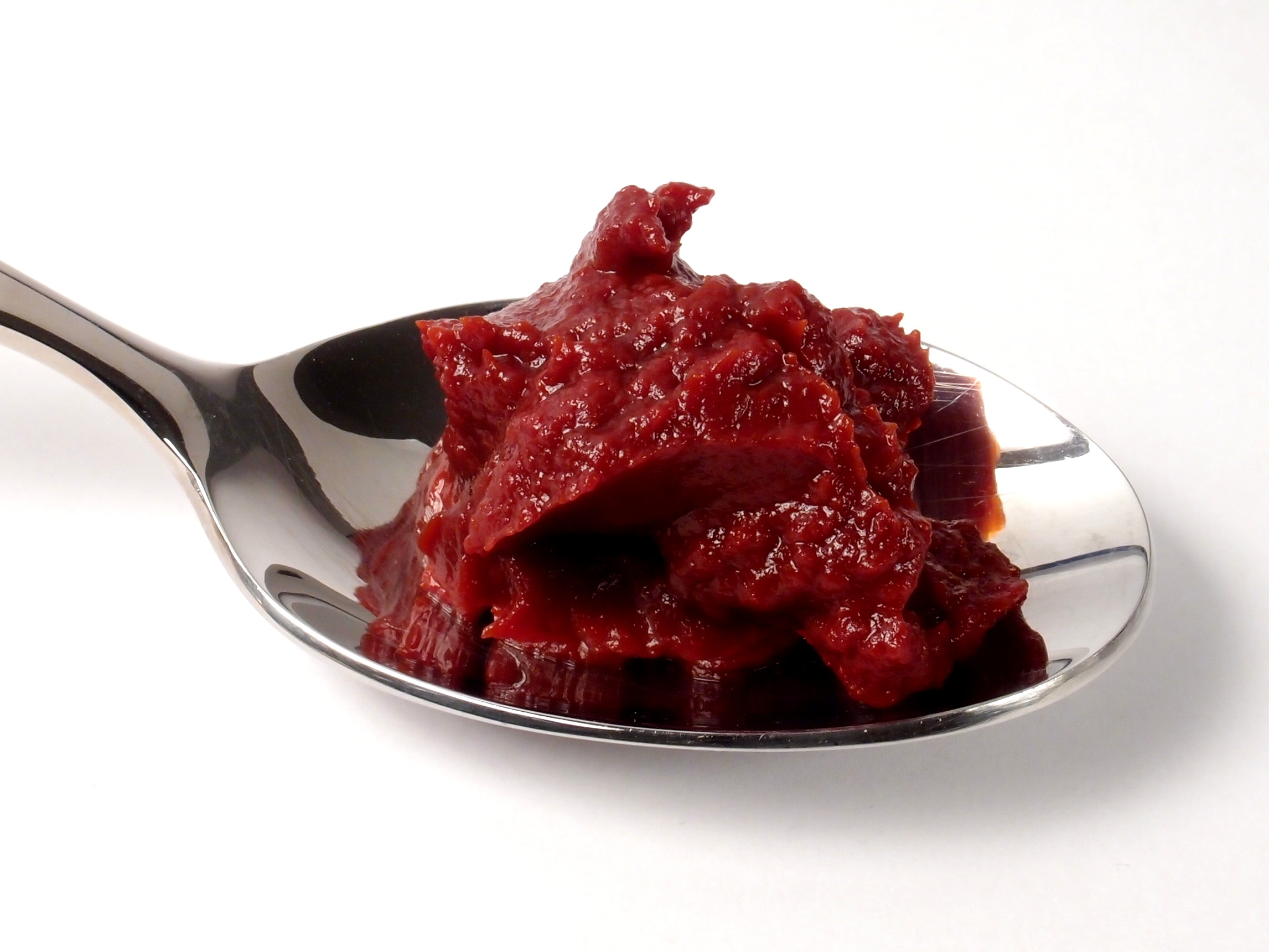
Tomato paste

- Baba ghanoush – an eggplant (aubergine) based paste
- Date paste – used as a pastry filling
- Funge de bombo – a manioc paste used in northern Angola, and elsewhere in Africa
- Guava paste
- Hilbet – a paste made in Ethiopia and Eritrea from legumes, mainly lentils or faba beans, with garlic, ginger and spices
- Hummus – made from chickpeas with the addition of tahini, olive oil, lemon juice, salt and garlic
- Moretum
- Pesto
- Quince cheese
- Ssamjang – a Korean sesame- and bean-based paste used as a sauce on meat
- Tapenade – made from olives ground with anchovies or capers, spices and olive oil
- Tomato paste – made from boiling tomatoes until they form a thick paste which is stored for later use in soups, sauces and stews
- Wasabi – Japanese horseradish ground to a fine paste, used in sushi dishes

=== Grain ===
- Farina
- Millet paste – consumed by the Fula people in the Sahel and West Africa, it is a main ingredient in nyiiri, a common Fula dish that is prepared using millet paste and a thick sauce
- Pamonha – a traditional Brazilian paste made from fresh corn and milk
- Polenta
- Mealy pop or bogobe – prepared from ground grain, usually maize or millet, and often fermented before cooking

=== Instant soup ===
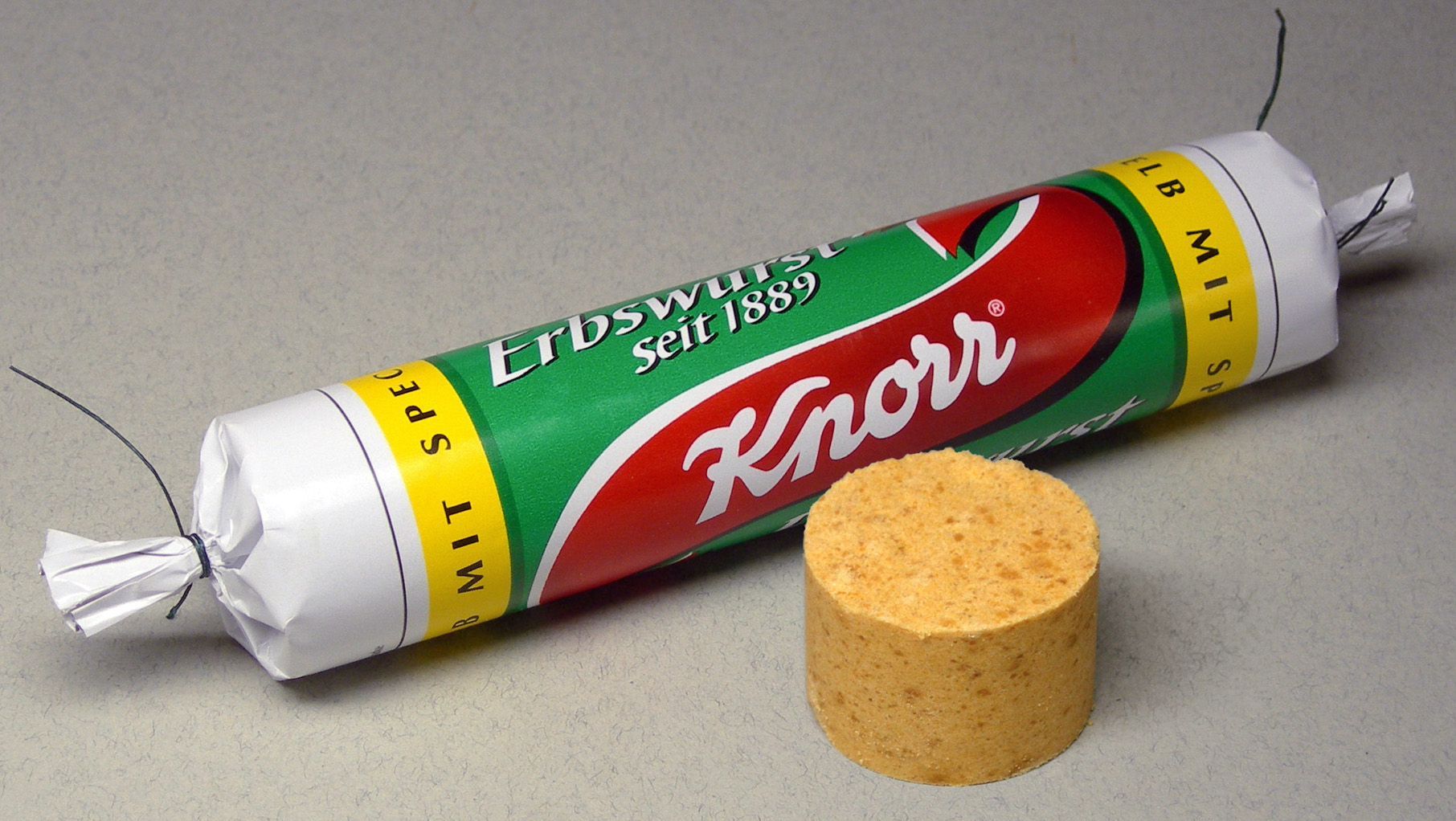
Erbswurst is a traditional instant pea soup from Germany in a condensed paste.

- Erbswurst

=== Legume ===
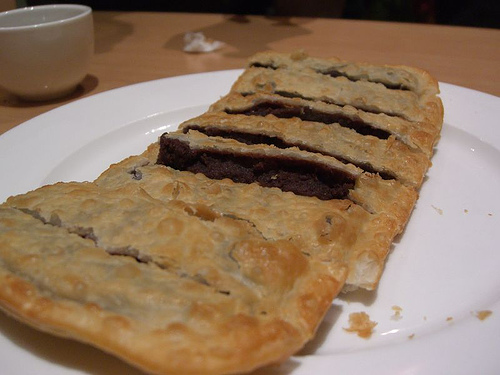
A pancake filled with red bean paste

- Black bean paste – Type of sweet bean paste
- Cheonggukjang – Korean fermented soybeans
- Doubanjiang – Chinese spicy bean paste
- Doenjang – Korean fermented bean paste
- Fermented bean paste – Fermented foods made from ground soybeans
- Miso – Traditional Japanese seasoning
- Mung bean paste – Species of plant
- Red bean paste – Paste made from adzuki beans
- Sweet bean paste – Bean paste used in Asian cuisines
- Tauco – Indonesian fermented bean paste
- Tương – Condiment made from soybeans
- Yellow soybean paste – Chinese fermented soybean paste

=== Meat ===
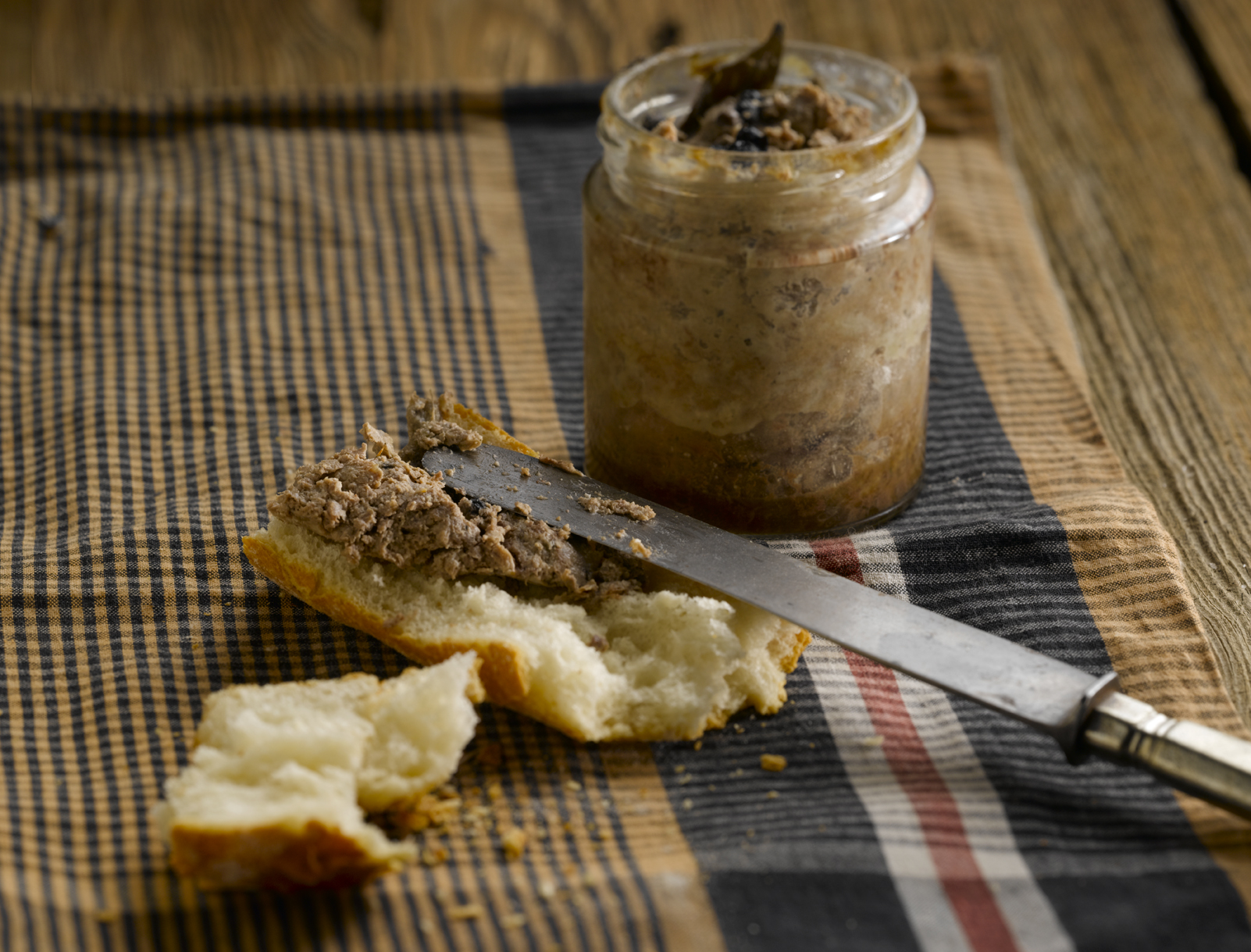
Pâté spread atop bread

- Chopped liver
- Pâté – finely chopped, finely ground or pureed highly seasoned meat, prepared using beef, pork, liver, or animal organs
- Pheasant paste
- Potted meat food product

=== Nut and seed ===
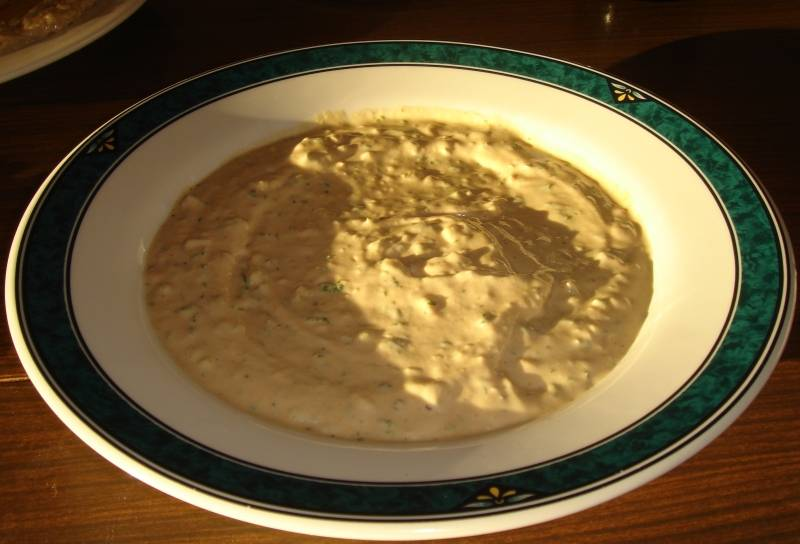
Tahini

- Almond butter – Nut butter made from almonds
- Almond paste – Filling made from almonds and used in pastries
- Cashew butter – Food spread made from baked or roasted cashews
- Lotus seed paste – Chinese dessert ingredient
- Marzipan – made from almonds, with the addition of sugar and sometimes egg whites, it is used as a filling for confections, or hardened to serve as is
- Peanut butter
- Peanut paste – a product of peanuts and is used as an ingredient in sauces, baked goods and breakfast cereals, among others
- Plumpy'nut
- Satsivi – a Georgian specialty made from walnuts, it is used unsweetened as a bread dip, or sweetened as a filling in a baklava-like pastry
- Sunflower butter
- Tahini – made from ground sesame seeds

=== Spices and herbs ===
==== Herbs ====
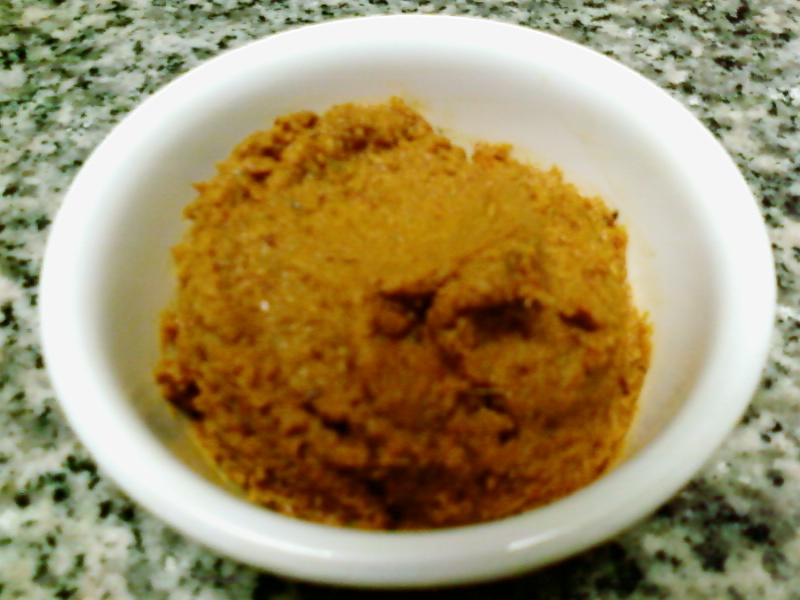
Red kroeung paste

- Kroeung

==== Spicy ====
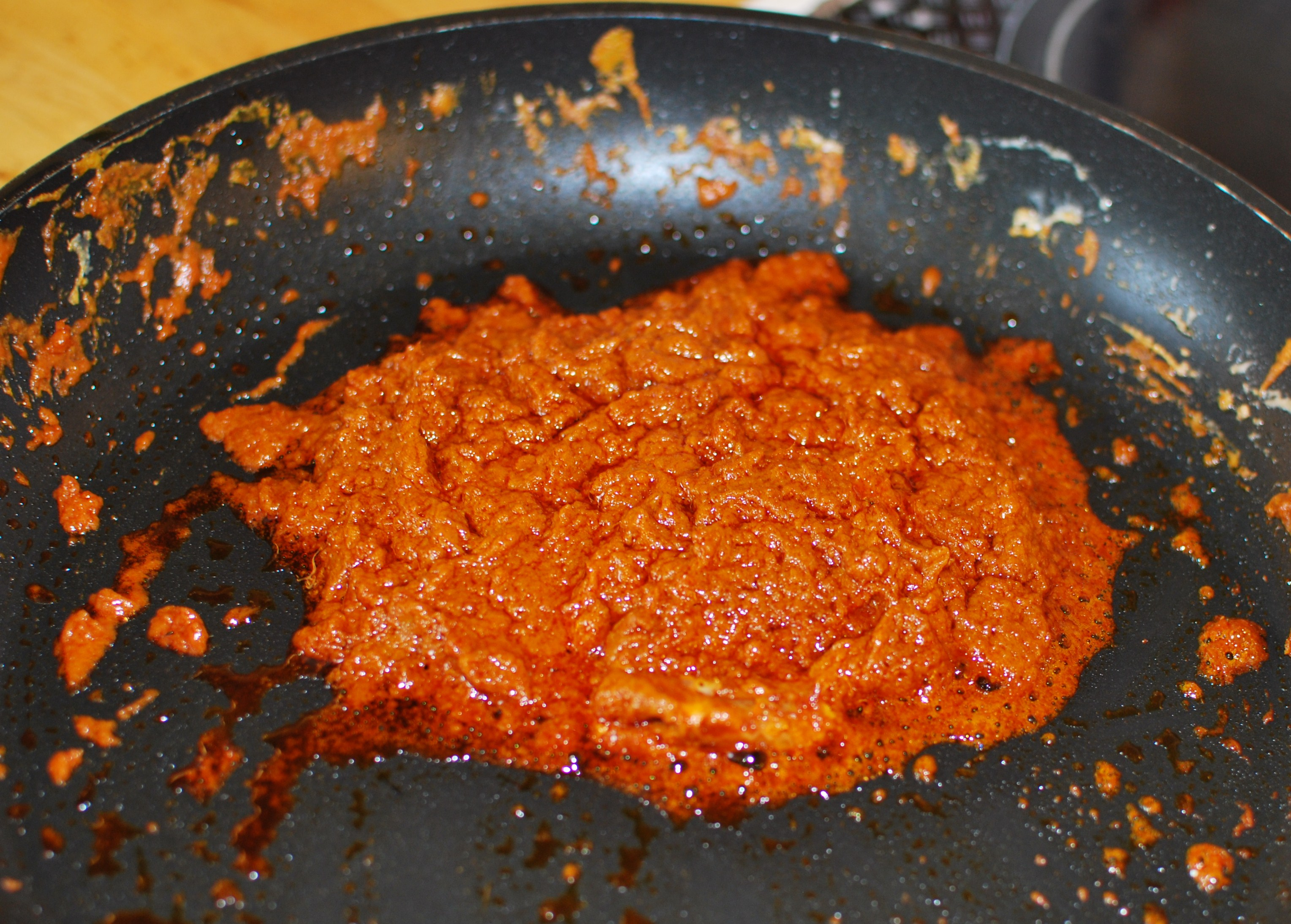
Phanaeng curry paste is fried with coconut cream to make the curry more creamy in flavor.

- Biber salçası – Paste made from peppers or tomato and salt, originating in Turkey
- Chili pepper paste – Condiment prepared with chili peppers
- Curry paste – Spiced Asian-inspired sauces and dishes
- Ginger garlic masala – Mixture of raw ginger and garlic cloves
- Gochujang – Spicy fermented Korean condiment
- Harissa – North African hot chili pepper paste
- Jeow bong – Sweet and savory Lao chili paste originating from Luang Prabang, Laos
- Phanaeng curry paste – Thick, salty, sweet red Thai curry paste
- Recado rojo – Spice blend
- Sambal – Indonesian spicy relish or sauce
- Ssamjang – Spicy soybean paste used in Korean cuisine
- Yuzukoshō – Japanese fermented citrus and chili paste

=== Sweet ===
- Cookie butter
- Fondant – a basic sugar paste used as an intermediary in the production of candies and icings

=== Yeast extracts ===
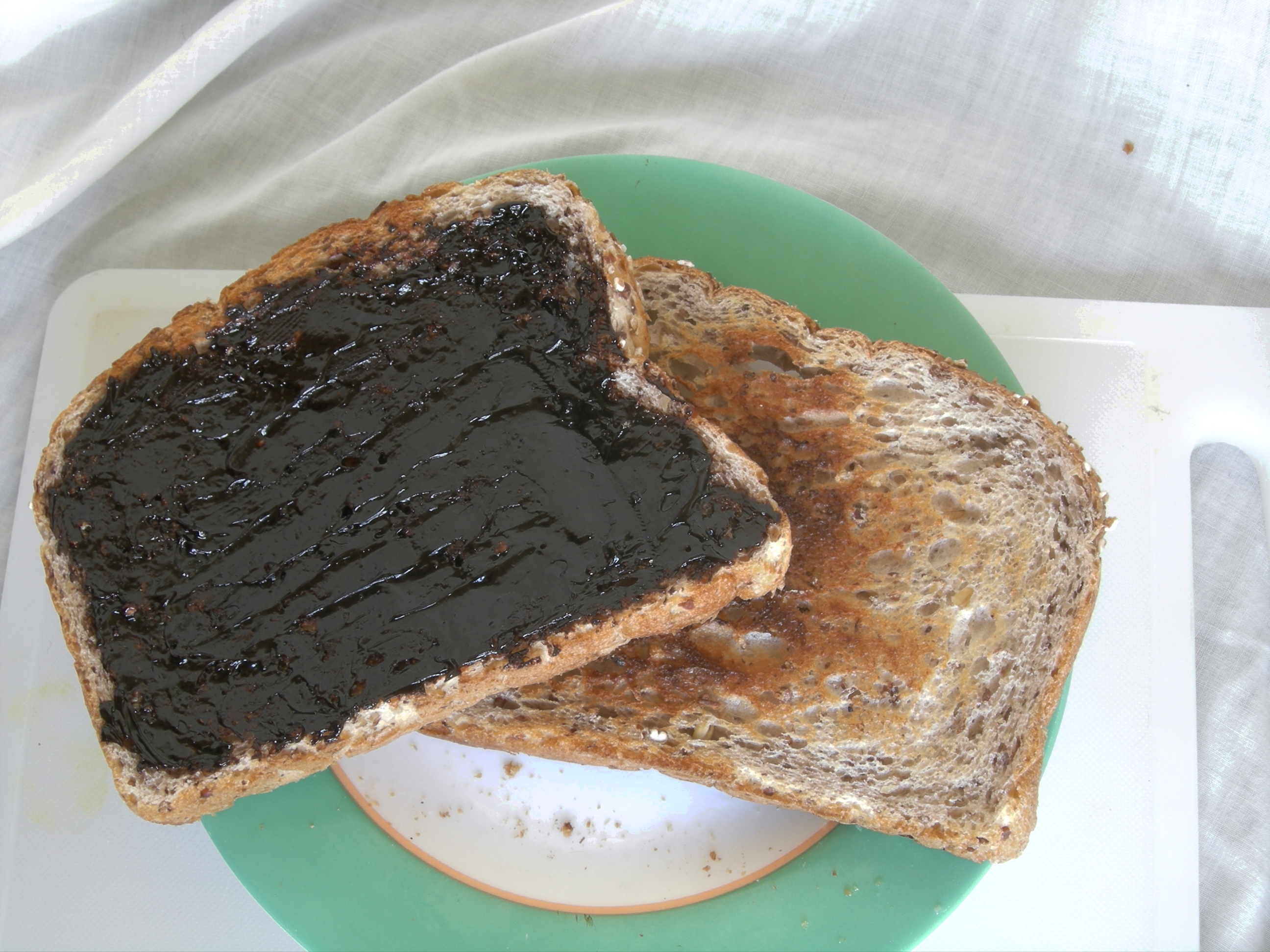
Marmite spread on toasted bread

Yeast extracts, usually as byproduct from brewing beer, are made into food pastes, usually dark-brown in color.

- AussieMite – Company producing savory food spread
- Cenovis – Swiss brand of spread similar to Marmite
- Guinness Yeast Extract
- Marmite – UK brand of yeast extract spread
- Marmite (New Zealand) – Brand of spread made from yeast in New Zealand
- Oxo – Food ingredient brand
- Promite – Food paste
- Vegemite – Australian brand of spread made from yeast
- Vitam-R – Food product from processed yeast

== See also ==
- Huff paste
- List of condiments
- List of dips
- List of spreads
- Mortar and pestle – a kitchen device used since ancient times to prepare ingredients or substances by crushing and grinding them into a fine paste or powder
- Wet grinder – a food preparation appliance used especially in Indian cuisine for grinding food grains to produce a paste or batter
