= Paste (food) =

Semi-liquid edible substance

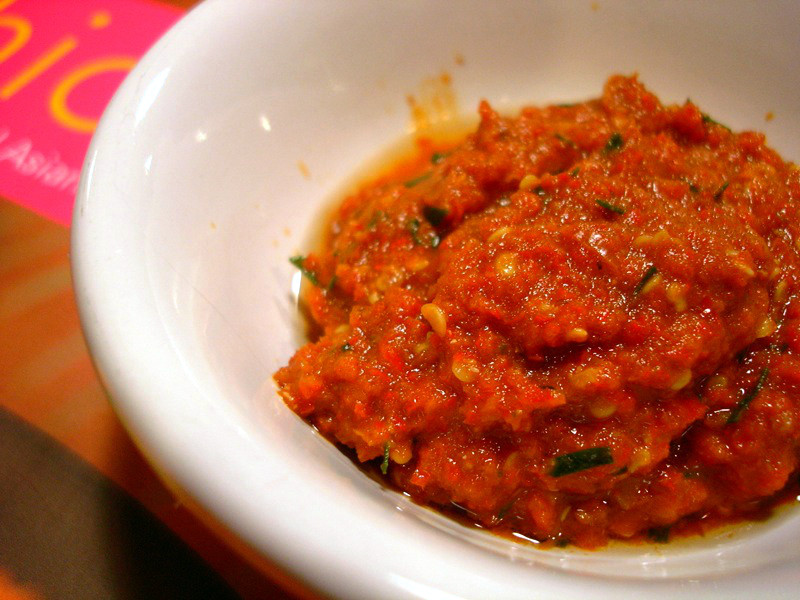
Prepared shrimp paste with chilli, Thai lime leaves, sugar and water added.

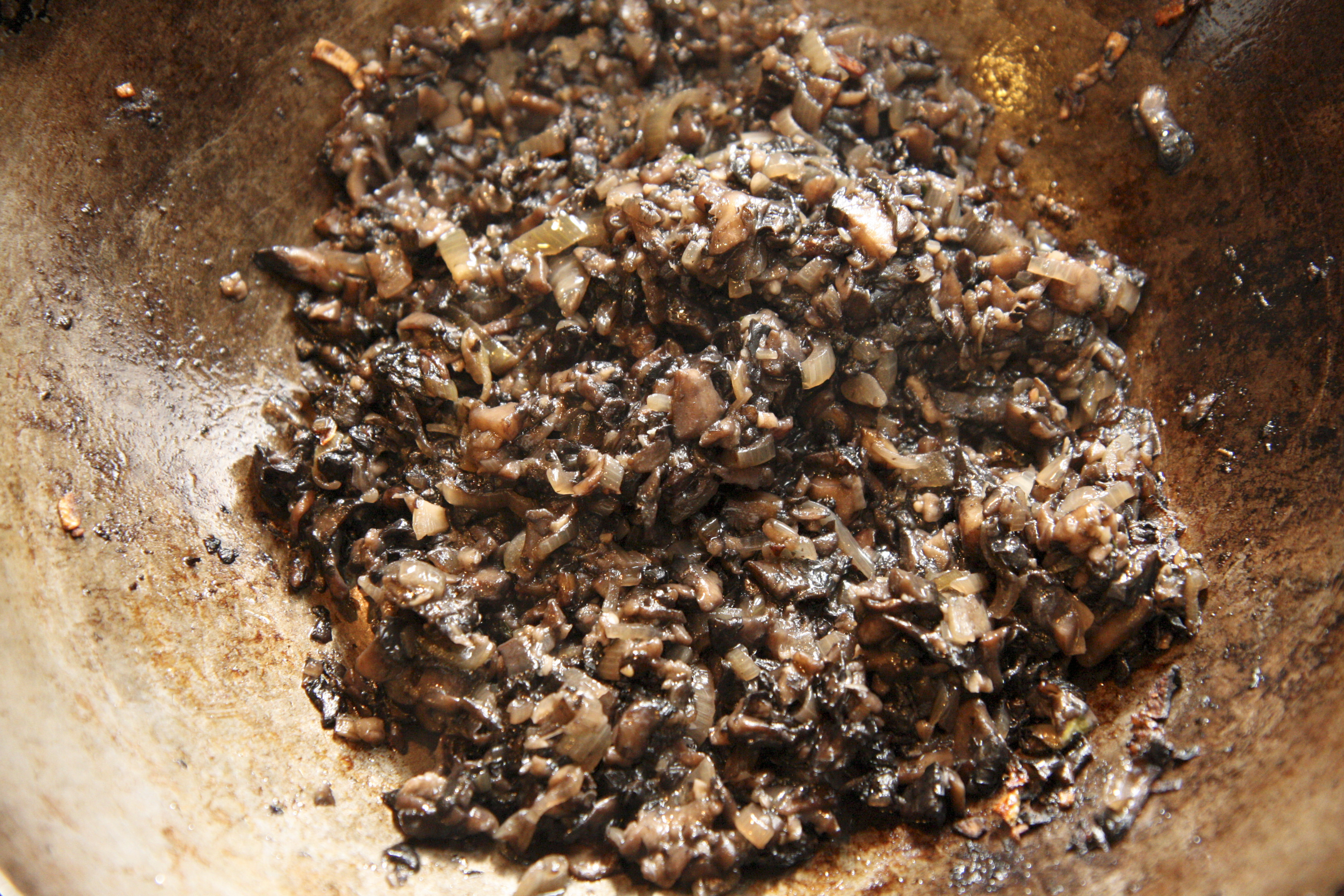
Duxelles being cooked, which is eventually reduced into a paste

A food paste is a semi-liquid colloidal suspension, emulsion, or aggregation used in food preparation or eaten directly as a spread. Pastes are often highly spicy or aromatic, are often prepared well in advance of actual usage, and are often made into a preserve for future use. Common pastes are some fruit preserves, curry pastes, and nut pastes. Purées are food pastes made from already cooked ingredients.

Some food pastes are considered to be condiments and are used directly, while others are made into sauces, which are more liquid than paste. Ketchup and prepared mustard are pastes that are used both directly as condiments and as ingredients in sauces.

Many food pastes are an intermediary stage in the preparation of food. Perhaps the most notable of such intermediary food pastes is dough. A paste made of fat and flour and often stock or milk is an important intermediary for the basis for a sauce or a binder for stuffing, whether called a beurre manié, a roux or panada. Sago paste is an intermediary stage in the production of sago meal and sago flour from sago palms.

Food for babies and adults who have lost their teeth is often prepared as food pastes. Baby food is often very bland, while older adults often desire increased spiciness in their food pastes.

== Preparation ==
Blenders, grinders, mortars and pestles, metates, and even chewing are used to reduce unprocessed food to a meal, powder, or when significant water is present in the original food, directly into a paste. If required, water, oil and other liquids are added to dry ingredients to make the paste. Often the resultant paste is fermented or cooked to increase its longevity. Often pastes are steamed, baked or enclosed in pastry or bread dough to make them ready for consumption.

== Preservation ==
Traditionally salt, sugar, vinegar, citric acid and beneficial fermentation were all used to preserve food pastes. In modern times canning is used to preserve pastes in jars, bottles, tins and more recently in plastic bags and tubes.

== Examples ==
=== Aromatic and spicy ===
While many of the pastes listed below may be made particularly spicy or aromatic or not, some pastes are specifically intended to deliver intense flavor rather than bulk.

- Achiote paste is a chili paste with a number of other spices including annatto.
- Curry paste
- Pesto

=== Cheese and milk ===
Cheeses always start out as food pastes, but most of them become harder during the fermentation and curing processes.

- Clotted cream, as used in British cuisine, is made by heating cream to scalding temperatures to make it thicker.
- Mascarpone is a soft cream cheese made from cow's milk used in Italian cuisine.

=== Fish and meat ===
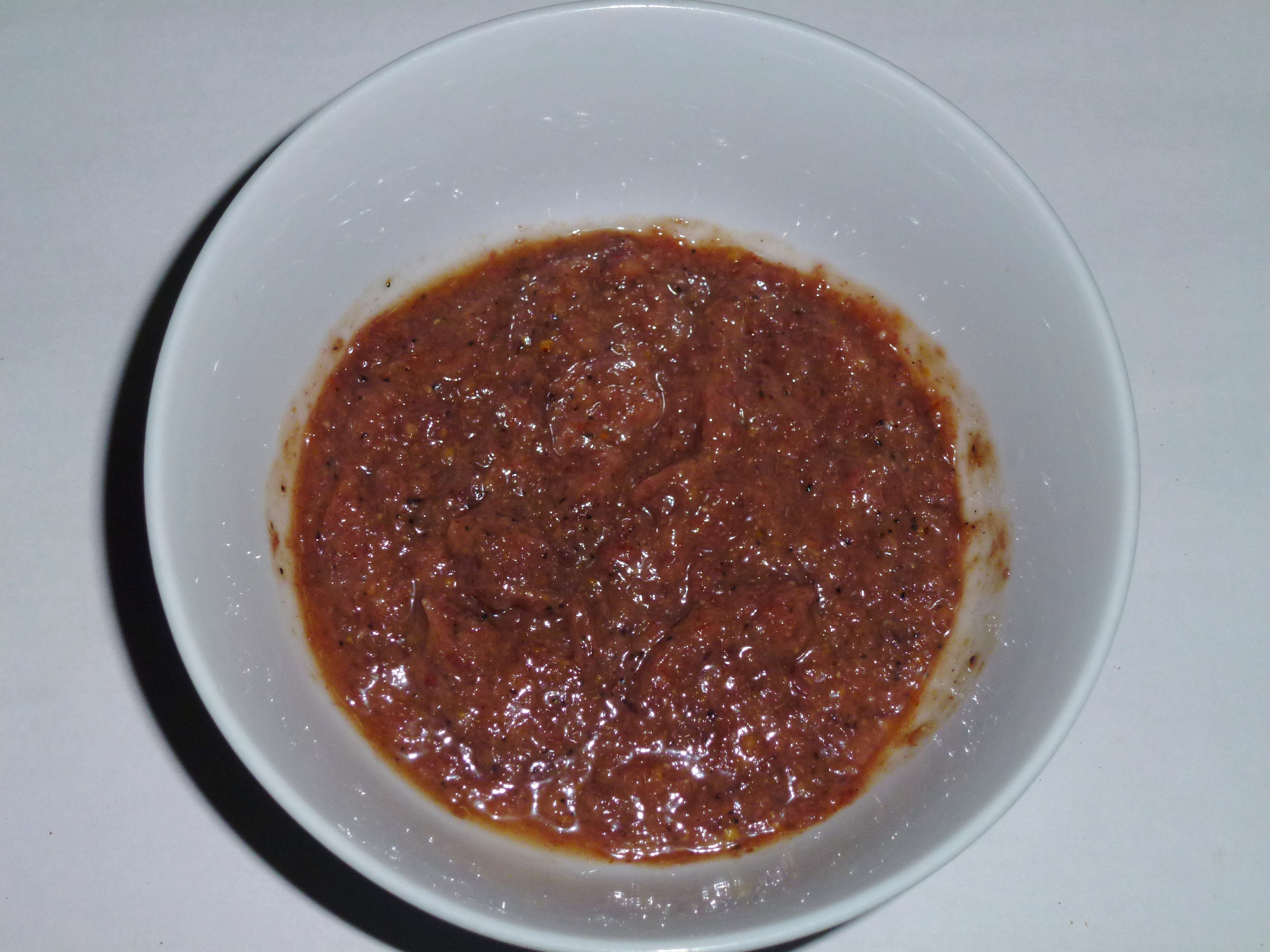
Shrimp paste from Thanh Hoa province, Vietnam

- Fish paste is prepared from fish parts through fermentation.
  - Anchovy paste -- used as a condiment or ingredient in recipes.
- Meat paste or Potted meat food product usually produces a homogeneous texture and flavor suitable for a spread.
- Pâté is finely chopped, finely ground or pureed highly seasoned meat, whether fish, beef, pork, liver, or other organs.
- Shrimp paste is made from fermented ground shrimp, either from fresh shrimp or dried ones, with the addition of salt. Prepared shrimp paste often has oil, sugar, garlic, chili, and other spices added.

=== Grain ===
- Farina --often prepared as a hot cereal or porridge
- Pamonha is a traditional Brazilian paste made from fresh corn and milk.
- Pasta is prepared from wheat food pastes often with the addition of egg.
- Polenta
- Mealy pop or Bogobe is prepared from ground grain usually maize or millet and often fermented before cooking.

=== Instant soup ===
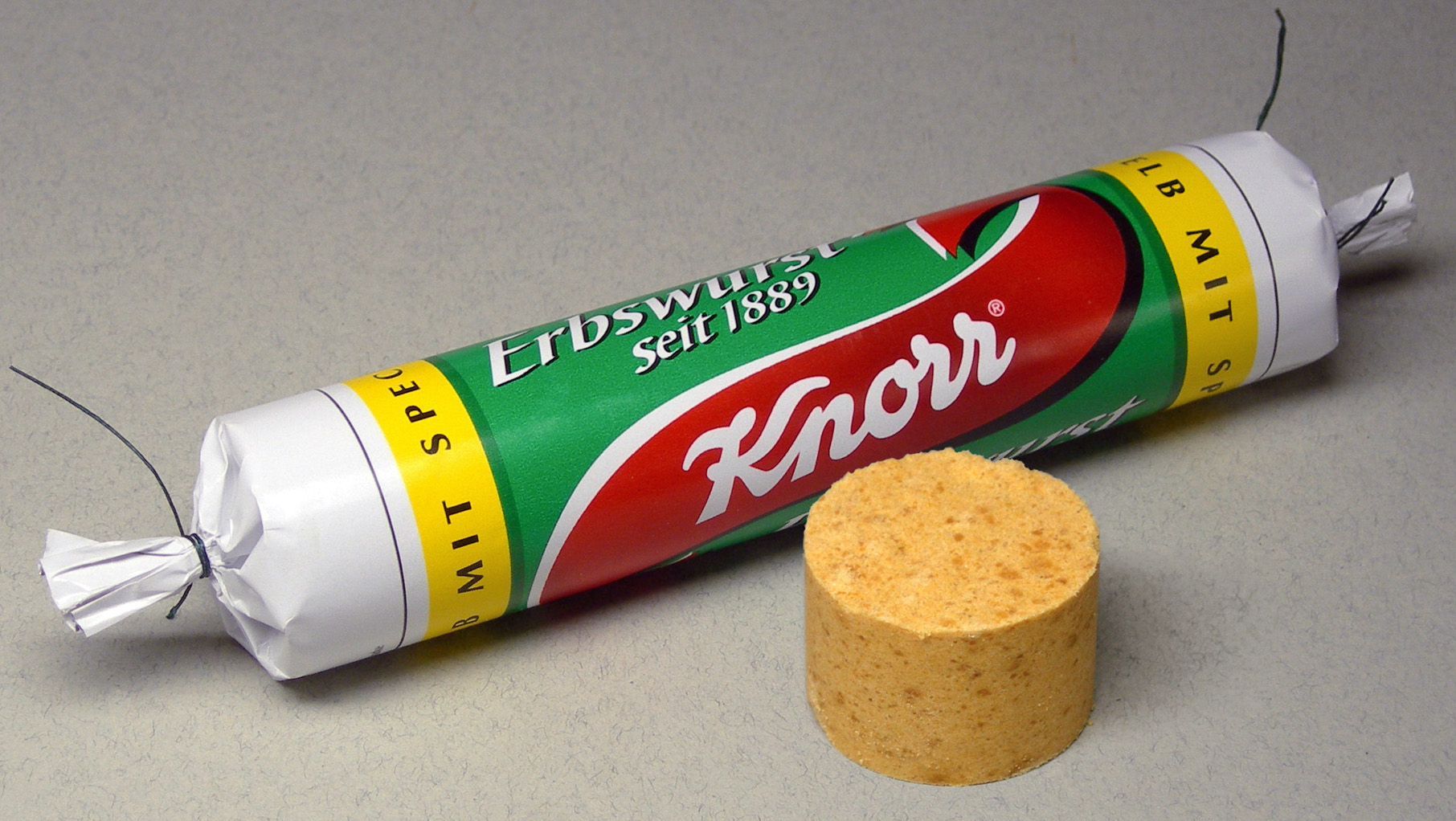
Erbswurst, a traditional instant pea soup from Germany, is a concentrated paste

- Erbswurst

=== Nut and seed ===
- Almond butter
- Cashew butter is used as a substitute for peanut butter, where peanut allergies are an issue.
- Marzipan, made from almonds, with the addition of sugar and sometimes egg whites, is used as a center-fill in confections, or hardened to serve as a candy itself.
- Peanut butter
- Sunflower butter
- Tahini is a paste made from ground, sesame seeds prominent in North African, Greek, Turkish and Middle Eastern cuisine.
- Walnut paste (საცივი) is a Georgian specialty, and is used unsweetened as a bread dip, or sweetened as a center-fill in a baklava-like pastry.

=== Sugar ===
Sugar pastes are usually used for frosting and icings, or sweet centers in pastry. Sugars are often combined with cream, oils and egg whites as well as water to make pastes.

- Fondant is a basic sugar paste used as an intermediary in the production of candies and icings.

=== Vegetable and fruit ===
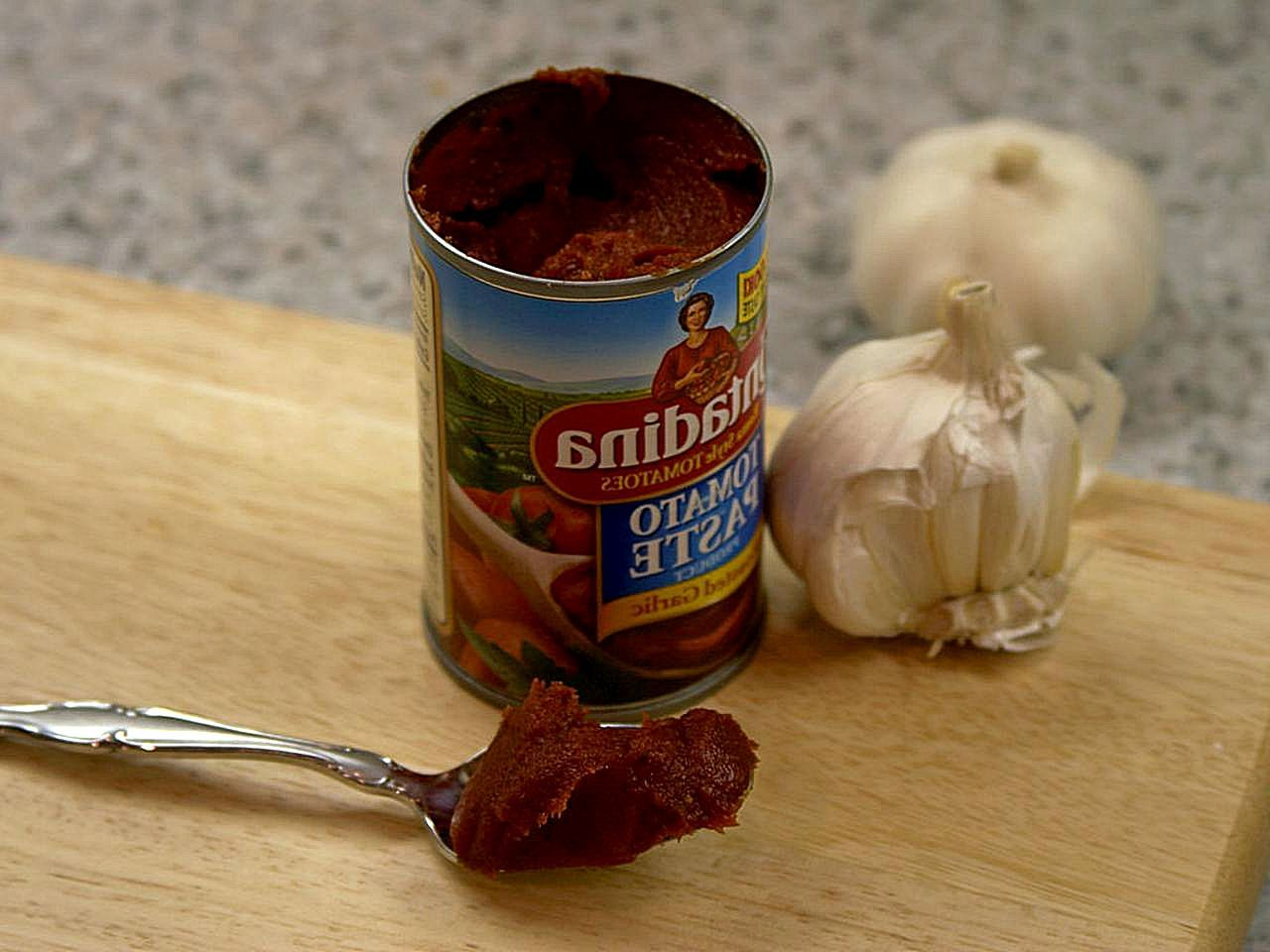
Tomato paste

- Àmàlà is a Nigeria specialty paste, thick and brown, made from yams.
- Baba ghanoush is an eggplant (aubergine) based paste.
- Date paste is used as a center-fill in pastries.
- Fermented bean paste is made from ground soyabeans and allowed to ferment.
- Funge de bombo is a manioc paste used in northern Angola, and elsewhere in Africa.
- Hilbet is a paste made in Ethiopia and Eritrea from legumes, mainly lentils or faba beans with garlic, ginger and spices.
- Hummus is made from chickpeas with the addition of tahini, olive oil, lemon juice, salt and garlic.
- Red bean paste
- Ssamjang is a Korean, sesame and bean based paste used as a sauce on meat.
- Sweet bean paste is a typical Chinese filling for bao.
- Tomato paste is made from boiling tomatoes until they form a thick paste which is stored for later use in soups, sauces and stews.
- Qizha is a Palestinian paste made from crushed black fennel seeds.

=== Yeast extracts ===
Yeast extracts, usually as byproduct from brewing beer, are made into food pastes, usually dark-brown in colour. They are used to flavour soups and sausages, in the preparation of salad dressings, and directly as spreads.

- Cenovis,
- Marmite and
- Vegemite.

== See also ==
- Chili pepper paste
- Condiment
- List of food pastes
- List of foods
- Sauce
