= Enzym Group =

Biotechnological company

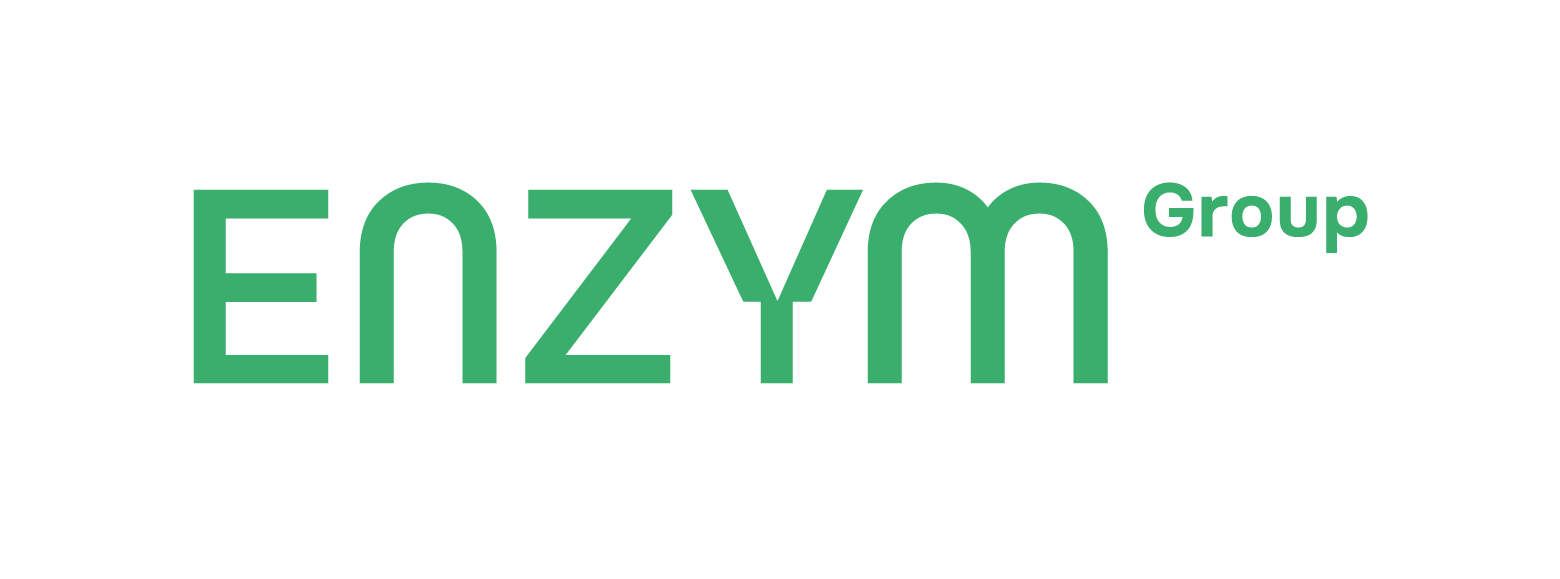
- Company type: Group of companies
- Industry: Food industry, biotechnology
- Founder: Orest Vovk
- Headquarters: Lviv, Ukraine
- Key people: Olena Vovk (owner), Rostyslav Vovk (owner)
- Products: Products based on yeast cell for food (extract, flakes), feed (additives for animal husbandry and aquaculture), alcohol (yeast for craft alcohol), baking (yeast, mixes and additives)
- Services: Development and production of products based on yeast cell
- Divisions: PJSC "Enzym Company" (Lviv, Ukraine), LLC "LinkCell" (Lviv, Ukraine), ExtraCell Ingredients Sp.Z.o.o (Krakow, Poland)
- Website: https://www.enzymgroup.com/

Enzym Group is a biotech company based in Lviv, Ukraine, specializing in developing and producing products based on yeast cells. The company was founded in 1994. It is one of the largest yeast manufacturers in Eastern Europe.

== History ==
In 1870, the Grund brewery was founded in Lviv, where yeast was later produced as a by-product. In 1922, the Lviv Joint Stock Brewery Company and the Vienna-based Mautner Markhof Company established the joint stock company "Lysynetska Pressed Yeast and Spirit Factory" on the brewery's premises. After World War II, in 1945, the Lviv Yeast Factory emerged at the site of the Lysynetska factory, producing bakery yeast. The last years of the USSR were challenging for the factory: the equipment became outdated, and employees engaged in constant theft. In the 1980s, the enterprise changed CEOs seven times. In 1989, Orest Vovk was appointed the company's CEO, and the company entered the revival period. On July 7th, 1994, the enterprise was reorganized into the Closed Joint Stock Company "Enzym", undergoing full automation and computerization of production processes. By 1996, "Enzym" was the first in Ukraine to produce dry yeast, and in 2003 the company started export activity.

By 2003, the company's market share had grown to nearly 50% in Ukraine. In 2003, to diversify the business, Orest Vovk decided to create Kormotech, Ukraine's first pet food manufacturing company, a global company with teams in Ukraine, Lithuania, and the US, ranking 51st in the global pet food manufacturers ranking. The family of Ukrainian entrepreneurs Vovk owns Kormotech. Rostyslav Vovk, the son of Orest Vovk, holds the position of chairman of the supervisory board and CEO. In 2011, the company changed its type and name to the Private Joint Stock Company "Enzym Company".

In 2004–2005, the company launched a two-stage wastewater treatment system. In 2014–2015, the system was updated with two additional anaerobic reactors and a pressurized flotation station. In 2020–2021, the company started the fourth phase of modernizing the wastewater treatment system, having invested about 11 million euros wastewater treatment.

In 2014, the company decided to produce biotechnological products based on yeast cell. By 2020, "Enzym Company" had established its own R&D center, and started cooperation with Saarland University (Germany). The company also created and commercialized a new product - probiotic yeast for animal husbandry and aquaculture. In 2020, the company started building a new production line for yeast extracts LinkCell. The European Bank for Reconstruction and Development approved a loan of 10 million Euros for this project. The total investment amounted to about 26 million Euros.

In 2023, Enzym Group launched the first production of yeast extracts in Ukraine (LinkCell). Company Revenue by the end of 2023 is 46,2 million euros.

== Activity ==
The co-owners of Enzym Group are the family of Ukrainian entrepreneurs: Olena Vovk and Rostyslav Vovk — the children of Orest Vovk, the founder of Enzym Group. As of January 2024, Olena Vovk holds the position of Chairwoman of the company's Supervisory Board. The CEO of Enzym Group is Andriy Tsehelyk.

Enzym Group includes three companies: PjSC "Enzym Company" (Lviv, Ukraine), LLC "LinkCell" (Lviv, Ukraine), and ExtraCell Ingredients Sp.Z.o.o (Krakow, Poland). The company's main office is located in Lviv, Ukraine.

The company's key activities include the production of yeast and additives for baking, yeast for craft alcohol, feed additives for animal husbandry and aquaculture, and yeast-based ingredients for the food industry.

Over 60% of the company's products are exported to 23 countries worldwide (Europe, Asia, and Africa), including Belgium, Poland, the Czech Republic, Croatia, Bulgaria, the Netherlands, Germany, Slovakia, and others. In Poland, Enzym Group initiated a project for the small packaging of pressed yeast under the brand name "Drożdże Lwowskie". Enzym Group is the largest producer of yeast in Ukraine and one of the largest in Eastern Europe. As of 2021, over 50% of industrial bread-baking enterprises in Ukraine use the company's products.

In 2020, amidst the COVID-19 pandemic, Enzym Group and Kormotech purchased ventilators and other medical equipment for the needs of medical institutions in Lviv, totaling about 4 million UAH.

In 2022, the brand "Lvivski Drizhdzhi" donated 20% of its profits to support the Ukrainian Armed Forces, having transferred in total 4,000,000 UAH for the needs of the Ukrainian Armed Forces.
