= Marmite (New Zealand) =

Savoury spread

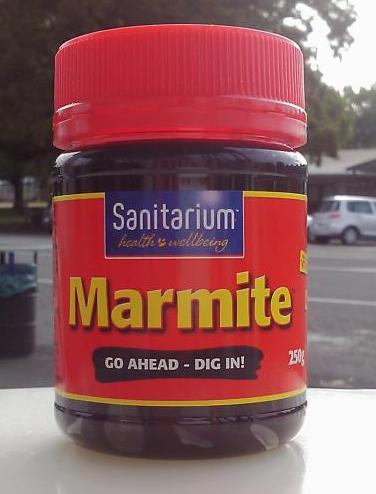
- A jar of Marmite
- Manufacturer: Marmite Food Extract Company
- Website: https://marmite.co.nz/

Marmite (/ˈmɑːrmaɪt/ MAR-myte) is a food spread produced in New Zealand by Sanitarium Health and Wellbeing Company and distributed in Australia and the Pacific. Marmite is made from yeast extract, a by-product of beer brewing. It is similar to British Marmite, but the two products are made by different companies; the UK version is made by Unilever.

Marmite has been manufactured in New Zealand since 1919. It is the only product sold as Marmite in Australasia and the Pacific Islands, whereas elsewhere in the world, the British variant predominates.

== History ==
In the late 19th century German scientist Justus von Liebig discovered that brewer's yeast could be concentrated, bottled, and eaten. In 1902 the Marmite Food Extract Company was formed in Burton upon Trent, Staffordshire, England with Marmite as its main product and Burton as the site of the first factory.

The product's popularity prompted the Sanitarium Health Food Company to obtain sole rights to distribute the product in New Zealand and Australia in 1908. They later began manufacturing Marmite under licence in Christchurch, albeit using a modified version of the original recipe, most notable for its inclusion of sugar and caramel. Common ingredients are also slightly different quantities from the British version; the New Zealand version has high levels of potassium, for example. New Zealand Marmite is described as having a "weaker" or "less tangy" flavour than the British version. It is distributed throughout Australia, New Zealand and the Pacific Islands.

== Usage ==
Sanitarium recommends spreading Marmite on bread with potato chips added to make a "Marmite and Chippie" sandwich.

== Nutritional information ==
Marmite is rich in B vitamins including thiamin (B_{1}), riboflavin (B_{2}), niacin (B_{3}), folic acid (B_{9}) and B_{12} (cobalamin). The sodium content of the spread is high and has caused concern, although it is the amount per serving rather than the percentage in bulk Marmite that is relevant. The main ingredient of Marmite is yeast extract, which contains a high concentration of glutamic acid.

Marmite
| | per 100 g | per 5 g serving | |
|---|---|---|---|
| Energy | 697 kJ | 35 kJ | |
| Calories | 167 kcal | 8 kcal | |
| Protein | 17.4 g | 0.9 g | |
| Carbohydrates | 16.8 g | 0.8 g | |
| sugars | 16.8 g | 0.8 g | |
| Fat | 1.1 g | <0.1 g | |
| Fibre | 11.2 g | 0.5 g | |
| Sodium | 3.31 g | 0.166 g | |
| Potassium | 2.81 g | 0.14 g | |
| | | | % RDI |
| Thiamin | 11.0 mg | 0.55 mg | 50% |
| Riboflavin | 8.6 mg | 0.43 mg | 25% |
| Niacin | 50.0 mg | 2.5 mg | 25% |
| Folate | 800 μg | 40 μg | 20% |
| Vitamin B_{12} | 10.0 μg | 0.5 μg | 25% |
| Iron | 36.0 mg | 1.8 mg | 15% |
RDI = Recommended Daily Intake

Ingredients: Yeast, sugar, salt, mineral salt (potassium chloride), colour (caramel III), corn maltodextrin, mineral (iron), vitamins (niacin, thiamin, riboflavin, folate, B_{12}), herbs, spices. Contains derivatives of barley and wheat.

== Availability worldwide ==
As Unilever has the exclusive right to the Marmite name in the United Kingdom, and Sanitarium has the exclusive right to the name in Australia and New Zealand, their respective versions of Marmite must be sold under a different name in the other countries. Unilever International sells the British Marmite as Our Mate in Australia and New Zealand, while Sanitarium sells the New Zealand Marmite as "NZ-Mite" in the UK.

In November 2008, Marmite was rebranded as 'Mo-mite' in support of Movember, the annual moustache-growing charity event.

=== 2012–13 "Marmageddon" shortage ===
In November 2011, Sanitarium shut down the sole production line of New Zealand Marmite at its Christchurch factory after a cooling tower at the factory was deemed unsafe, having cracked in the 22 February 2011 Christchurch earthquake and its aftershocks. On 19 March 2012, the company announced that its own stocks of Marmite had run out and the production line was not expected to be running again until July. Some supermarkets reported at the time they had already run out of stock, and there was only a few weeks' worth of stock left in their distribution centres, leading to the dubbing of Marmite as "black gold" and the crisis as "Marmageddon".

Immediately after the announcement, there was reported panic buying of Marmite from supermarkets, and over one hundred auctions for jars of Marmite, new and used, were listed on online auction site TradeMe, with some sellers asking for up to NZ$800 per jar; over 185 times its usual retail price of around $4.25 per 250 g jar People were advised to use the spread sparingly, with even Prime Minister John Key admitting he might have to switch to Australian rival Vegemite once his personal supplies had run out. Throughout the shortage Marmite ran a number of marketing campaigns on social media which led to a 2,975% increase in fans and a lot of brand exposure.

In June 2012, it was announced that additional structural damage had been uncovered at the factory, and the proposed July return to production was rescheduled to October. Problems with an unfinished lift at the factory delayed production into 2013.

Sanitarium announced in February 2013 that production had restarted and the factory was in the process of building up stock ready for the return. Marmite returned to New Zealand retailers effective midnight on 20 March 2013, although only the 250 g jar size was initially available and many supermarkets imposed a limit of two jars per customer per day to promote fairness and prevent bulk buying. Supply to overseas retailers resumed after the New Zealand supply and demand settled.

== See also ==
- Ambient food – Foods that can be stored at room temperature
- Cenovis – Swiss brand of spread similar to Marmite
- Guinness Yeast Extract – Irish savoury spread
- List of spreads
- Nutritional yeast – Type of deactivated yeast
- Promite – Food paste
- Twiglets – British snack brand shaped like twigs
- Vegemite – Australian brand of spread made from yeast
- Vitam-R – Food product from processed yeast
