= Yeast extract agar =

Yeast extract agar is a growth medium containing yeast extract. It may refer to:

- The nonselective yeast extract agar of Windle Taylor
- YM (selective medium), for yeasts and molds
- Buffered charcoal yeast extract agar, for Legionella
