= Guinness Yeast Extract =

Irish savoury spread

- Alternative names: GYE
- Type: Savoury spread
- Place of origin: Ireland
- Created by: Arthur Guinness Son & Co.
- Invented: 1936
- Main ingredients: Yeast extract

Guinness Yeast Extract, commonly known by its initials GYE, was an Irish savoury spread, made from yeast extract. It was a by-product of the Guinness beer brewing process and produced by Arthur Guinness Son & Co., Dublin. The product was launched in Ireland on 2 November, 1936 and discontinued in 1968.

In addition to spreading on toast or bread, one or two level teaspoonfuls added to each 1 L (1 imp qt) of soup enriched the flavour while enhancing the nutritional value. It could also be used as an emergency gravy without any addition except hot water for diluting. It was used to strengthen normal gravy, and flavour stews and dishes containing minced meat. A half a teaspoonful added to a glass of hot water or hot milk produced a drink consumed at elevenses, teatime, and as a nightcap.

In February 2007 Marmite produced a limited edition Guinness Marmite of 300,000 250g jars of their yeast extract with 30% Guinness yeast.

== See also ==
- Bovril
- Promite
- Vegemite
- Marmite
