= Cheesymite scroll =

Australian baked food

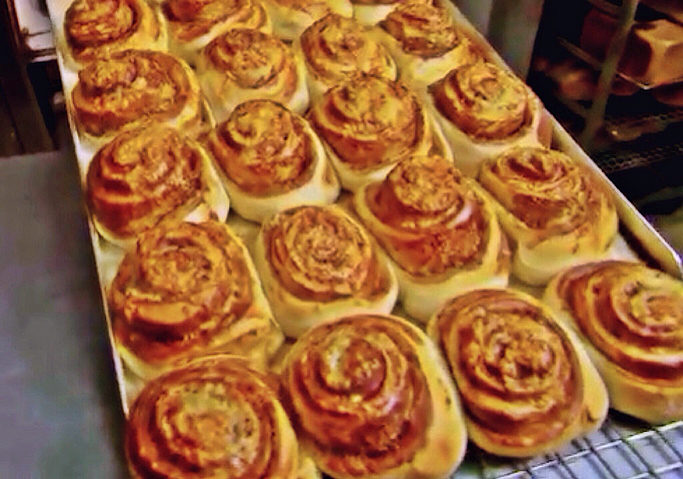
- Cheesymite scrolls
- Type: Bread
- Place of origin: Australia
- Main ingredients: Flour, water, vegemite, cheese, yeast

A cheesymite scroll is a savoury Australian baked food commonly found at Bakers Delight and Brumby's bakeries, as well as at Australian supermarkets. It consists of a spiral of baked bread (similar in appearance to a pain aux raisins) with Vegemite and butter inside and with melted cheese, usually cheddar or Colby, on top. Cheesymite scrolls recipes are also to be found for home baking. The cheesymite scroll was first invented in 1994 by Bakers Delight.
