= AussieMite =

Company producing savory food spread

- Founded: 16 January 2000
- Headquarters: Australia, Australia
- Products: AussieMite
- Owner: AussieMite Pty Ltd
- Website: aussiemite.com.au

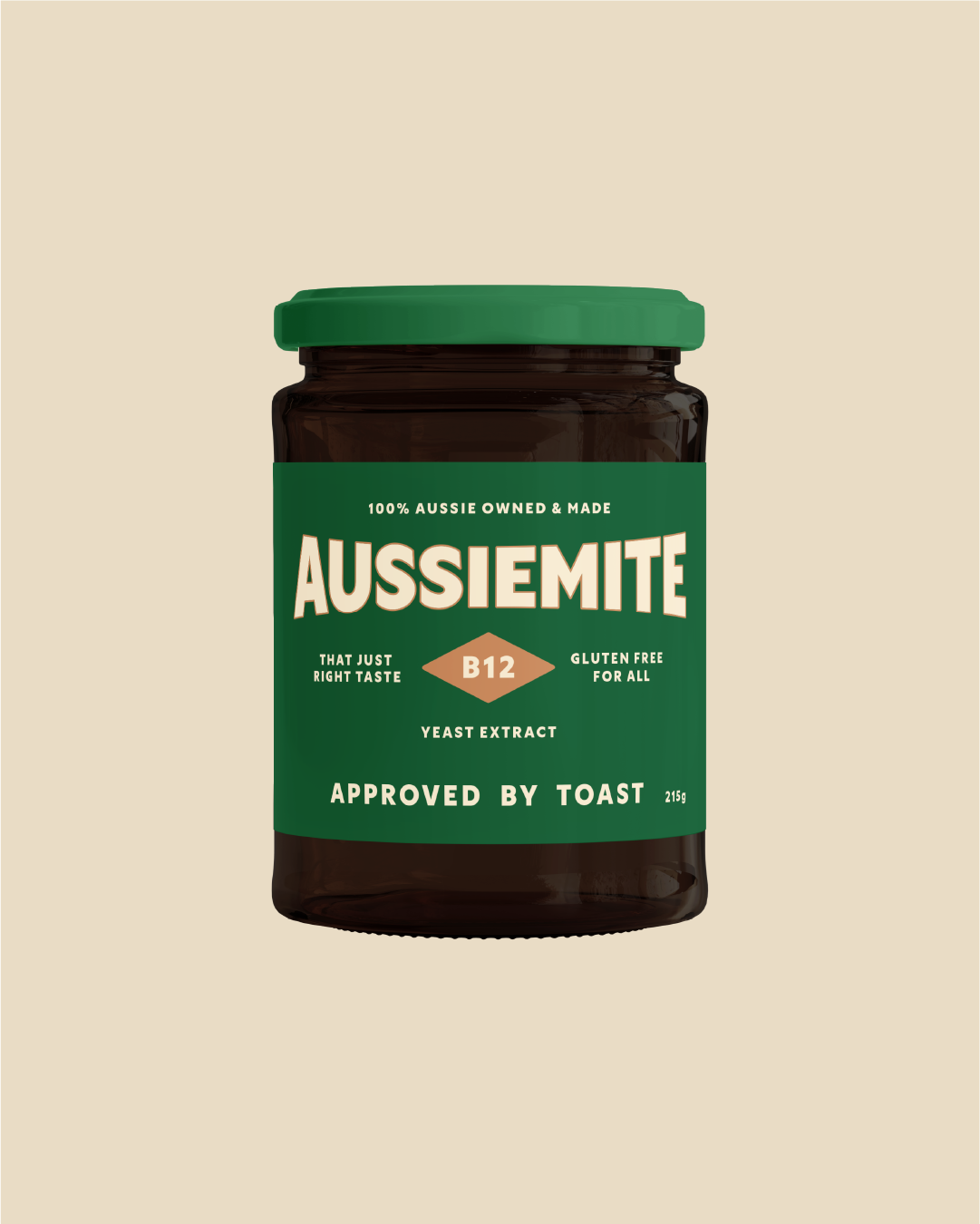
AussieMite Yeast Extract

AussieMite is an Australian savoury spread based on yeast extract invented by AussieMite. It is made from gluten-free baker's yeast. AussieMite is a vegan source of B vitamins, including supplementary vitamin B12. It is traditionally eaten spread thinly on buttered toast.

AussieMite is a sticky dark-brown paste with a distinctive, salty, powerful flavour and aroma. This taste is represented in the marketing slogan “Approved by Toast.”

== History ==
AussieMite was first launched in 2000 Australia wide into Australian retailers Coles, Woolworth’s and Independent retailers. It was the first true Australian owned and made product since Vegemite was foreign owned at the time by Kraft Foods. In 2017 Bega Foods purchased Vegemite for 460 million. Upon launching AussieMite in 2000, Kraft Foods took AussieMite to the Supreme Court of South Australia. In 2012 Dick Smith launched an Ozemite. The legal battle went on for 5 years against Dick Smith Food's Ozemite which is now discontinued.

== Nutrition ==
AussieMite
- Type: Savoury food spread
- Place of origin: Australia
- Main ingredients: Vegetable Protein Yeast Extract
- Food energy (per 5g serving): 13 kcal (54 kJ)
Nutritional value
(per 5g serving)
- Protein: 0.4g g
- Fat: <0.1 g
- Carbohydrate: 2.6 g

AussieMite is rich in B vitamins including thiamine (B_{1}), riboflavin (B_{2}), niacin (B_{3}), and folic acid (B_{9}). Vitamin B_{12} is only available through artificial enrichment; riboflavin and folic acid are added on top of the naturally occurring amount. The sodium content of the spread is high and has caused concern, although it is the amount per serving rather than the percentage in AussieMite that is relevant. (Sodium amount is noted as table salt-equivalent in Australian nutritional labels. 5.2 g of salt corresponds to .4 g of sodium per 5g serve.) The main ingredient of AussieMite is yeast extract and vegetable protein yeast extract from Australia and New Zealand. AussieMite is gluten-free, as it is made from baker's yeast. AussieMite removed caramel colour 150c and Vitamin B6 due to the toxicity issues circulating the Australian media claiming health supplements containing vitamin B6 can cause peripheral neuropathy.

== Similar products ==
There are a number of similar yeast products available in other countries; these products are not directly connected to the original AussieMite recipe and brand. The Australian product Vegemite was developed in early 1920s by the chemist and food technologist Cyril Callister for Fred Walker & Co. due to shortages of Marmite exports to Australia as a result of the First World War. It is now distributed in many countries. Other products include Marmite UK, Cenovit, a Brazilian spread; Vitam-R, a German spread; Cenovis, a Swiss spread (sold internationally under the brand Sonaris); and Vegex, an autolyzed yeast product available in the United States since 1913. In the United Kingdom, own-branded yeast extract, very similar to AussieMite, is sold by Sainsbury's, Asda, Tesco and Aldi.

== Usage ==
AussieMite has traditionally been eaten as a savoury spread on bread, toast, savoury biscuits or crackers, and other similar baked products. Owing to its concentrated taste, it is often spread very thinly in combination with butter or margarine. It can be made into a savoury hot drink by adding one teaspoon to a mug of hot water, much like Oxo or Bovril. It is also commonly used to enrich casseroles and stews. AussieMite is often paired with cheese - for example, in a cheese sandwich or a cheese-flavoured biscuit. In Australia AussieMite has been onboard Qantas and offering an AussieMite cheese scroll.

AussieMite has been featured in many recipes and food blogs. In Malaysia, Singapore and Hong Kong, AussieMite is enjoyed stirred into congee (savoury rice porridge).
