= Vegemite =

Australian brand of spread made from yeast

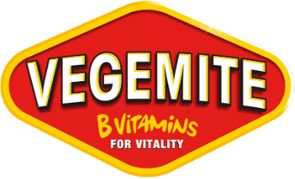

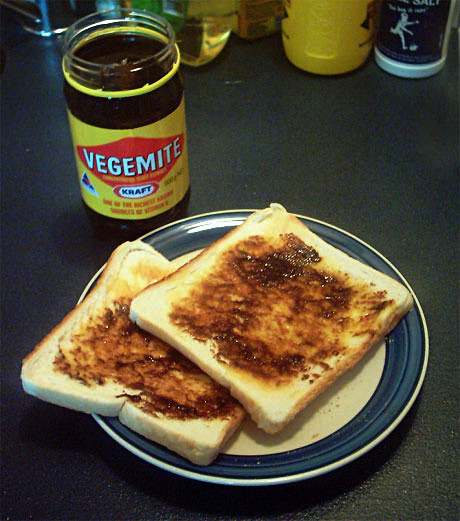
- Vegemite on toast
- Product type: Food spread
- Current owner: Bega Group
- Country: Australia
- Introduced: 1923; 103 years ago
- Previous owners: Fred Walker Company; Kraft Walker Cheese Co.
- Website: vegemite.com.au

Vegemite (/ˈvɛdʒəmaɪt/) is a brand of a thick, dark brown Australian food spread made from leftover brewers' yeast extract with various vegetable and spice additives. It was developed by Cyril Callister in Melbourne, Victoria, for the Fred Walker Company in 1922 and was first sold in stores on 25 October 1923.

A spread for sandwiches, toast, crumpets and cracker biscuits as well as a filling for pastries, Vegemite is similar to other yeast-based spreads such as Marmite in the UK and its New Zealand version, Australian Promite, MightyMite, AussieMite, OzEmite, German Vitam-R and Swiss Cenovis.

Vegemite has a strong flavour and is typically eaten in small amounts. It is salty, slightly bitter, malty and has an umami flavour similar to beef bouillon (because it is rich in glutamates). It is low-FODMAP, vegan, kosher and halal. It is known for being high in B vitamins.

Following the death of Fred Walker in 1935, the Vegemite brand came under the ownership of the American company Kraft Foods. However, in 2017 the brand returned to Australian ownership when the Bega Group purchased it alongside other assets from Mondelez International (formerly Kraft Foods Inc.).

== History ==
=== Beginnings ===
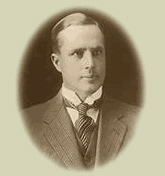
Fred Walker's company first created and sold Vegemite in 1922.

In 1919, following the disruption of British Marmite imports after World War I, the Australian company Fred Walker & Co. gave Cyril Callister the task of developing a spread from the used yeast being dumped by breweries. Callister had been hired by the chairman Fred Walker.

Callister used autolysis to break down the yeast cells from waste obtained from the Carlton & United brewery. Concentrating the clear liquid extract and blending with salt, celery and onion extracts formed a sticky black paste.

Following a competition to name the new spread with a prize pool of £A50 (equivalent to A$4,400 in 2022), "Vegemite" was selected by Fred Walker's daughter Sheilah, and it was registered as a trademark in Australia in 1919; the name of the person who coined the name is not known.

Vegemite first appeared on the market in 1923 with advertising emphasising its value to children's health, but it failed to sell well. Faced with growing competition from Marmite, from 1928 to 1935 the product was renamed "Parwill" to make use of the advertising slogan "Marmite but Parwill", a two-step pun on the new name and that of its competitor; i.e. "If Ma [mother] might ... then Pa [father] will." This attempt to expand market share was unsuccessful and the name reverted to Vegemite, but it did not recover its lost market share.

=== Commercial success ===
In 1925, Walker had established the Kraft Walker Cheese Co. as a joint venture company with J. L. Kraft & Bros to market processed cheese and, following the failure of Parwill, in 1935 he used the success of Kraft Walker Cheese to promote Vegemite. Following the death of Walker in 1935, the Fred Walker Company was absorbed by Kraft Walker Cheese Co., a subsidiary of Kraft Co. In a two-year campaign to promote sales, Vegemite was given away free with Kraft Walker cheese products (with a coupon redemption) and this was followed by poetry competitions with imported American Pontiac cars being offered as prizes. Sales responded and in 1939 Vegemite was officially endorsed by the British Medical Association as a rich source of B vitamins. Rationed in Australia during World War II, Vegemite was included in Australian Army rations and by the late 1940s was used in nine out of ten Australian homes.

=== Recent years ===
In April 1984, a 115-gram (4.1 oz) jar of Vegemite became the first product in Australia to be electronically scanned at a checkout.

Vegemite is produced in Australia at its Port Melbourne manufacturing facility, which produces more than 22 million jars annually. Virtually unchanged from Callister's original recipe, Vegemite now far outsells Marmite and other similar spreads in Australia. The billionth jar of Vegemite was produced in October 2008.

Vegemite was also produced in New Zealand for over 50 years, but as of August 2006 production had ceased. The New Zealand version of Marmite remains successful there.

==== Acquisition by Bega Cheese ====
The Vegemite brand was owned by Mondelez International (formerly Kraft Foods Inc. until 2012) until January 2017, when it was acquired by the Australian Bega Group in a US$460,000,000 agreement for full Australian ownership after Bega would buy most of Mondelez International's Australia and New Zealand grocery and cheese business.

== Consumption ==
A common way of eating Vegemite is on toasted bread with a layer of butter or margarine. Only a small amount of Vegemite is required due to its strong flavour. A Vegemite sandwich consists of two slices of buttered bread and Vegemite, but other ingredients such as cheese, lettuce, avocado or tomato may be added.

Vegemite can be used as a filling for pastries, such as the cheesymite scroll, or it may be used in more exotic dishes.

The official Vegemite website contains several recipes using Vegemite in foods such as pasta, burgers, pizzas, casseroles, and even ice cream. It has also suggested using Vegemite as an additive to soups or two-minute noodles.

=== Kosher and halal certification ===
Limited quantities of kosher Vegemite were first produced in the 1980s; a 2004 decision to cease certification was reversed after a backlash from Jewish consumers. Around 2009, Kraft contracted with the Kashrut Authority in New South Wales for their kashrut supervision services, and by 2010, all jars and tubes of ordinary Vegemite were labelled with the authority's stamp. In 2010, Vegemite also received halal certification.

=== Vegan certification ===
While the makers of Vegemite have long claimed that Vegemite was suitable for vegans, it was not until World Vegan Day 2019 that it received vegan certification from the Vegan Australia Certified program. A Vegemite nutritionist said that "the spread had always been a fitting choice for vegans".

== Nutritional information ==
Vegemite is a source of B vitamins, specifically thiamine, riboflavin, niacin and folate (B_{1}, B_{2}, B_{3} and B_{9}, respectively).

The main ingredient of Vegemite is yeast extract, which contains a high concentration of glutamic acid, the source of Vegemite's umami flavour. Vegemite does not contain any fat, added sugar or animal content. It contains gluten (a composite of storage proteins) as the yeast is derived from brewing.

One 5 gram serving contains 173 mg of sodium—8% of the recommended daily intake—in the form of salt. Australia only defines low salt foods, but by UK standards Vegemite is classified as a high salt content food.

A low-salt version of Vegemite, with 25% less sodium, and fortified with vitamins B_{6} and B_{12}, was introduced in September 2014.

== Advertising and branding ==
Originally promoted as a healthy food for children, during World War II advertising emphasised its medicinal value:

Vegemite fights with the men up north! If you are one of those who don't need Vegemite medicinally, then thousands of invalids are asking you to deny yourself of it for the time being.

At the same time, "Sister MacDonald" insisted that Vegemite was essential for "infant welfare" in magazines. Later advertisements began to promote the importance of the B complex vitamins to health.

Vegemite's rise to popularity was helped by the marketing campaigns written by J. Walter Thompson advertising that began in 1954, using groups of smiling, healthy children singing a catchy jingle titled "We're happy little Vegemites".

We're happy little Vegemites
As bright as bright can be.
We all enjoy our Vegemite
For breakfast, lunch, and tea.
Our mummies say we're growing stronger
Every single week,
Because we love our Vegemite
We all adore our Vegemite
It puts a rose in every cheek.

First aired on radio in 1954, the jingle was transferred to television in 1956. This advertising campaign continued until the late 1960s, but was discontinued in favour of ads promoting the product to all ages, not just children. In the late 1980s the original black and white television commercial was remastered, partially colourised, and broadcast periodically from 1991 to 2010. The two young twin girls who sang this advertising jingle were known as the "Vegemite Twins".

In March 2007, Kraft announced that they were trying to trace the eight original children from the campaign to celebrate the advertisement's 50th anniversary and to take part in a new campaign. The 1956 commercial was to be remade with the original children, now grown, to forge a link between "the new generation and the old ad". The media took up the search; all the children were identified in eight days and there were many TV specials and interviews in the Australian national media. The 50-year reunion campaign won the Arts, Entertainment & Media Campaign of the Year award at the November 2007 Asia Pacific PR Awards.

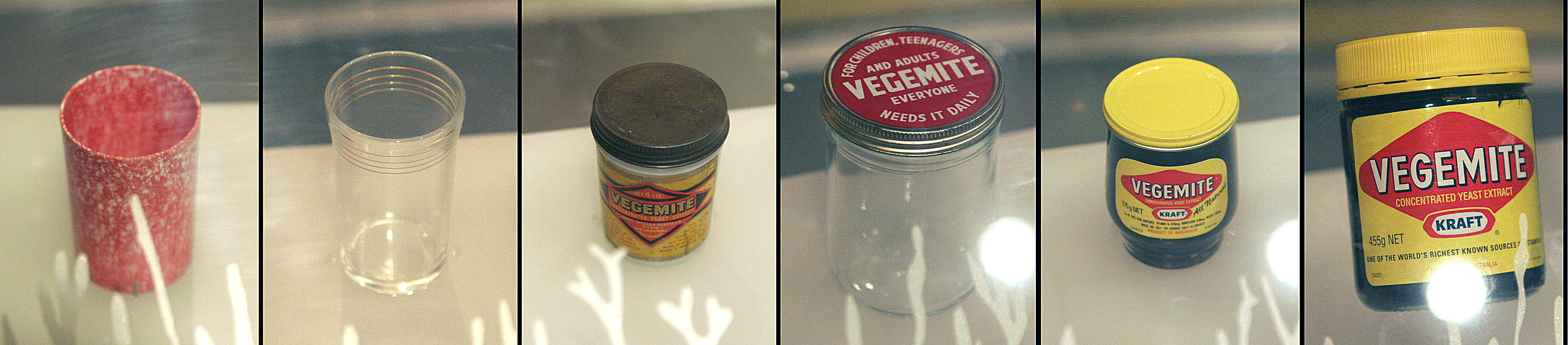
Different Vegemite jars – National Museum of Australia Originally introduced in 57 g (2 oz) milk glass jars and in sizes up to a 2.7 kg (6 lb) tin, from 1956 Vegemite was sold in clear glass jars.

== Variations ==
=== Vegemite Singles ===
During the 1990s, Kraft released a product in Australia known as Vegemite Singles. It combined two of Kraft's major products, Kraft Singles and Vegemite, into one, thus creating Vegemite-flavoured cheese. This extension of the Vegemite product line was an attempt by Kraft to capitalise on the enormous popularity of Vegemite and cheese sandwiches (made by placing a slice of cheese into a Vegemite sandwich). Vegemite Singles were later taken off the market.

=== Vegemite Cheesybite ===
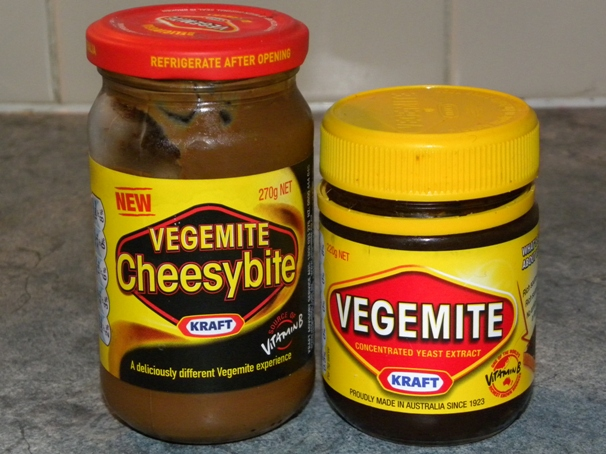
The newer Cheesybite beside the original Vegemite

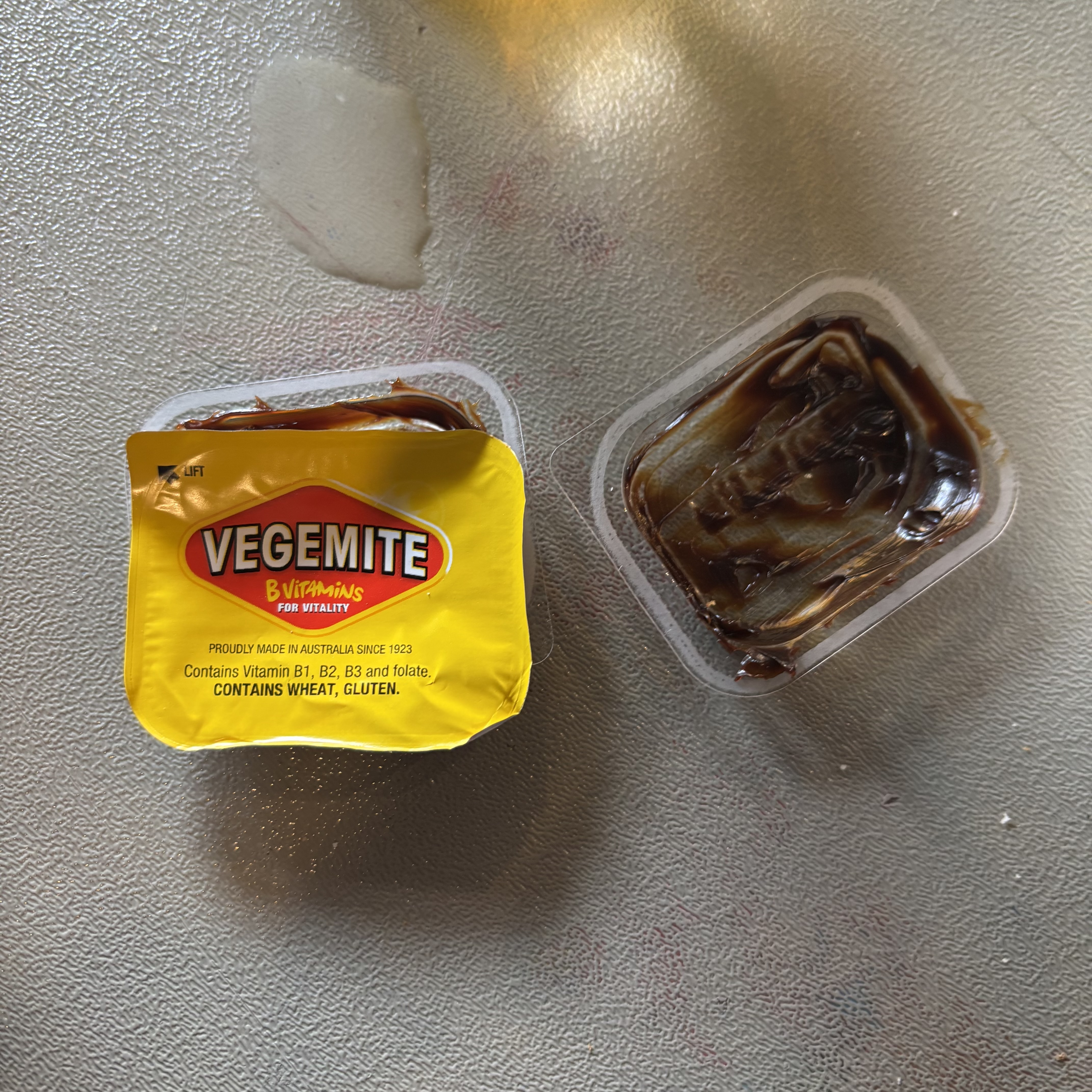
Vegemite packets

On 13 June 2009, Kraft released a new version of Vegemite. The formula combines Vegemite and Kraft cream cheese, spreads more easily and has a considerably less salty and milder taste than the original. To coincide with the release of the new recipe, Kraft ran a competition to give the new flavour a name. The new name was announced during the broadcast of the 2009 AFL Grand Final as iSnack 2.0. The name was chosen by a panel of marketing and communication experts to appeal to a younger market, capitalising on the popularity of Apple's iPod and iPhone. The choice immediately drew universal criticism and ridicule within Australia. Within days, opinion columns and social networking sites were flooded with derision and vitriol; and, after only four days, Kraft released plans to abandon the iSnack name, admitting that it may have been a mistake. Two days later, Kraft opened a new poll on its website, and the final name was announced on 7 October 2009 as "Vegemite Cheesybite", with Kraft claiming that the name had received 36% of the 30,357 votes that were cast for a name option, or approximately 10,900 votes. The popular suggestion "Cheesymite", long associated with the popular Cheesymite scroll, was already trademarked by other organisations. The product has been renamed "Vegemite & Cheese" under Bega's ownership.

=== My First Vegemite ===
In 2011, Kraft Foods Australia launched "My First Vegemite", a special formulation of original Vegemite for children aged older than one year. According to Kraft, the new formula has a "milder taste" and "additional health benefits including iron, B_{6} and B_{12} vitamins as well as 50% less sodium", and was designed in response to consumer demand for foods with lower sugar and salt content plus additional health benefits. Immediate reaction and media reports regarding the new formula were largely positive, but Kraft Foods Australia discontinued the "My First Vegemite" product line in 2012 due to poor sales performance.

=== Chocolate and Vegemite ===
In April 2015, Cadbury announced that it was to release a Vegemite-flavoured block of chocolate on 1 June. The chocolate block is Cadbury's Caramello block updated by mixing Vegemite with the chocolate. Critics described the taste as similar to salted caramel with a pleasant umami aftertaste. Criticism varied from "love it" to "tastes like they mixed the caramel and turkish delight filling with a lot of salt" to "needs more salt", with several tasters commenting that they thought the aftertaste was unpleasant.

=== Vegemite Blend 17 ===
In 2017, a premium variety, Vegemite Blend 17, was released for a limited time. It promised a "richer bolder taste" but at double the price of the standard product.

=== Other products ===
Other commercial products with Vegemite flavour include Smith's Crisps, In a Biskit, bagel crisps, sausages, meat pies, and Arnott's Shapes.

== Bans and rumours of bans ==
In October 2006, an Australian news company reported that Vegemite had been banned in the United States, and that the United States Customs Service had gone so far as to search Australians entering the country for Vegemite because it naturally contains folate, a B vitamin approved as an additive in the United States for just a few foods, including breakfast cereals. The U.S. Food and Drug Administration later stated that there were no plans to subject Vegemite to an import ban, or withdraw it from supermarket shelves. The United States Customs and Border Protection tried to dispel the rumour, stating on its website that "there is no known prohibition on the importation of Vegemite" and "there is no official policy within CBP targeting Vegemite for interception". The story of the "ban" later took on the status of urban legend. While Vegemite has never been popular in the US, it can still be purchased at supermarkets that stock imported food items.

Following newspaper reports in May 2011 that Vegemite and Marmite had been banned and were being removed from shelves in Denmark, outraged fans set up several Facebook groups. In response, Denmark's Ministry of Food, Agriculture and Fisheries stated that neither spread had been banned but that the respective companies had not applied for licences to market their products in Denmark. In 2004, Denmark had passed legislation prohibiting the sale of food products fortified with vitamins as a danger to health.

Vegemite is banned from prisons in several Australian states, with the ban in Victoria coming into effect from the 1990s. The smell of Vegemite can distract sniffer dogs trying to detect drugs being brought into prison, and it has been said that it can be used to brew alcohol due to its high yeast content, although Vegemite contains no live yeast. Similar bans were proposed in 2015 for a number of dry communities in outback Australia, but they were not enacted. In 2025, convicted murderer Andre McKechnie challenged the prison ban, arguing that it deprived him of the right to enjoy his culture as an Australian; the Supreme Court rejected McKechnie's appeal, saying his "cultural rights are limited primarily by the fact he has been sentenced to a term of imprisonment".

In 2025, the owner of an Australian-themed cafe in Toronto was informed by the Canadian Food Inspection Agency (CFIA) that, due to its added Vitamin B content, Vegemite is not permitted to be sold in Canada. After an intervention from the Australian government, the CFIA clarified that the "level of risk to human health from the added vitamins present in the product is low" and permitted its sale again.

== In popular culture ==
The Australian rock band Men at Work refer to a "Vegemite sandwich" in the second verse of their 1982 hit song "Down Under", from their debut studio album Business as Usual.

Australian band King Gizzard & the Lizard Wizard have a song called "Vegemite" on their 2014 album Oddments.

"True Blue", a country music song written by Australian singer-songwriter John Williamson, mentions Vegemite.

For the Rocket Power special Race Across New Zealand, the character Tito has an obsession with Vegemite, with his efforts to find it again becoming a running gag.

== See also ==
- List of spreads
- Vegemite wars
- Bonox, Bovril (beef extracts)
- Guinness Yeast Extract (yeast extract)
- Oxo (beef and yeast extract)
- Shelf-stable food
