= Three Threes Condiments =

- Industry: Condiments
- Founded: 1919; 107 years ago in Redfern, New South Wales, Australia
- Founder: Stanley Roy McAlpine
- Headquarters: Lidcombe, New South Wales, Australia

Three Threes Condiments is a condiments producer of Australia.

== Products ==
Their products include:

- Sweet mustard pickles (Spreadable and Chunky)
- Tomato sauce
- Pickled onions (Australian, Old Style and Honey Mustard)
- Sweet Spiced Gherkins
- Olives (Stuffed, Green, stuffed with fetta, stuffed with anchovies)
- Giardiniera (mix of vegetables in brine)
- Mint jelly
- Apple sauce
- Mightymite
- Passionfruit Butter
- Choc-Honey Spread
- Mediterranean Antipasto Mix
- Sundried Tomatoes in Olive Oil
- Stuffed Vine Leaves (Dolmades)

== See also ==
- List of oldest companies in Australia
