= Promite =

Food paste

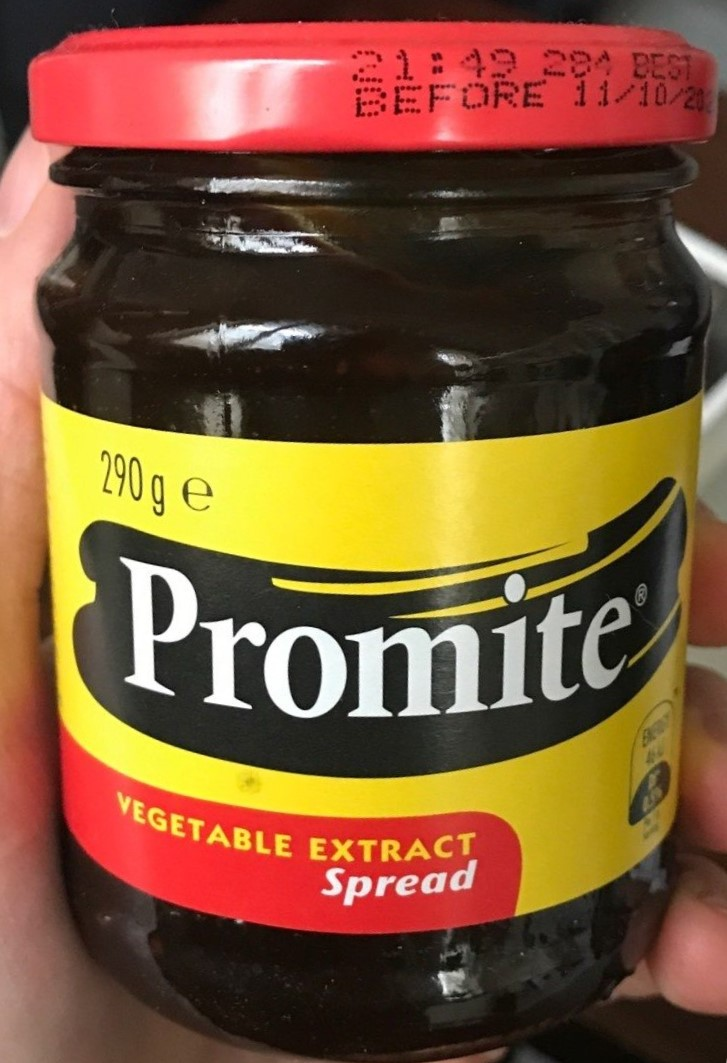
- A jar of Promite
- Type: Food paste
- Place of origin: Australia
- Created by: Henry Lewis & Company
- Invented: 1950s
- Main ingredients: Vegetables and yeast extract
- Similar dishes: Vegemite

Promite /ˈproʊmaɪt/ is a dark brown, salty food paste derived from yeast extract. It is primarily used as a spread on sandwiches and toast similar to Vegemite and Marmite. Promite was invented in the 1950s by Henry Lewis & Company and marketed under the MasterFoods brand. Henry Lewis & Company later became MasterFoods Australia and New Zealand, before being bought out by Mars, Incorporated, a privately owned U.S. company, in 1967. Promite has continued to be manufactured and primarily sold in Australia.

Like Vegemite, it is made from leftover brewer's yeast and vegetable extract, however Promite achieves a sweeter taste through the addition of sugar.

== Ingredients ==
According to Mars Customer care, "In 2013, we removed vitamins Thiamin (B1), Riboflavin (B2) and Niacin (B3), as well as two flavour enhancers, and found this to benefit some consumers sensitive to those vitamins, without impacting taste or texture". However, some vitamins remain from the raw ingredients, approximately:

Name	Vitamin	Abundance
Thiamine	B_{1}	4mg / 100g
Riboflavin	B_{2}	1mg / 100g
Niacin	B_{3}	50mg / 100g
Pantothenic acid	B_{5}	12mg / 100g
Vitamin B_{6}	B_{6}	3mg / 100g

== See also ==
- Cenovis
- Marmite (New Zealand)
- Vitam-R
- List of spreads
