= Yeast extract =

Food product from processed yeast

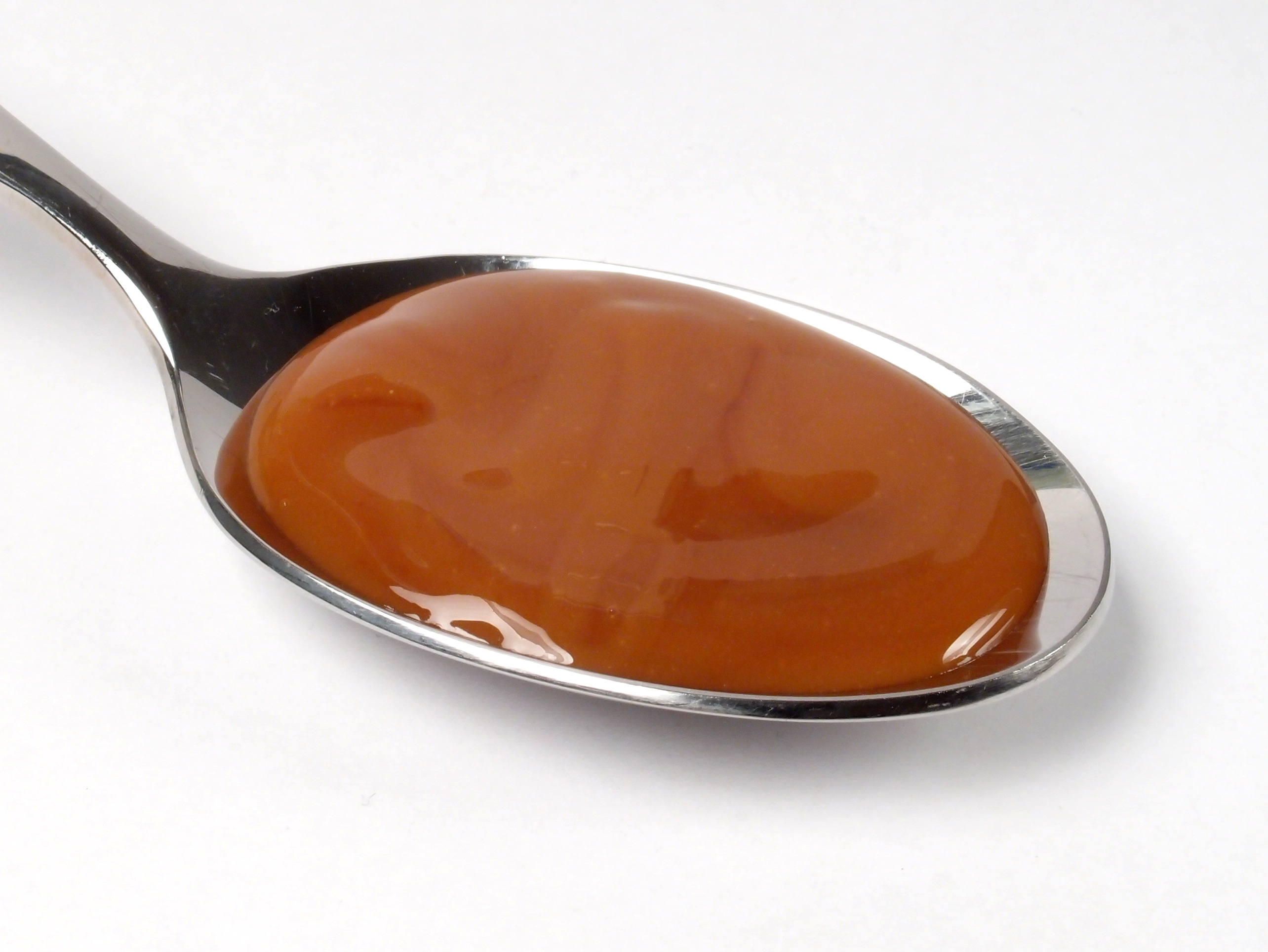
Liquid yeast extract

Yeast extracts consist of the cell contents of yeast without the cell walls; they are used as food additives or flavorings, or as nutrients for bacterial culture media. They are often used to create savoury flavors and umami taste sensations and can be found in a large variety of packaged foods including frozen meals, crackers, snack foods, gravy, stock and more. They are rich in B vitamins (but not B_{12}). Yeast extracts and fermented foods contain glutamic acid (free glutamates), an amino acid which adds an umami flavor. Glutamic acid is found in meat, cheese, fungi (mushrooms and yeast) and vegetables—such as broccoli and tomatoes. A number of other substances found in yeast extract provide aromas, some meat-like, when allowed to react under heat.

The thermal process to make yeast extract of the autolysate type was invented in the 19th century by Justus von Liebig. Yeast cells are heated until they rupture, then the cells' own digestive enzymes combined with the intense heat help to break large proteins down into simpler compounds (amino acids and peptides), a process called autolysis. The insoluble cell walls are then separated by centrifuge, filtered, and usually spray-dried. This is the process used for spreads such as Vegemite and Marmite.

Yeast extracts in liquid form can be dried to a light paste or a dry powder. This is not the same as nutritional yeast seasonings, which are made from lyophilized intact cells and consequently have a lighter flavor.

== Production ==
Yeast extracts in general are produced in three steps: fermentation (growing the yeast), disruption (breaking of the cells), and separation (to keep the soluble part). Although the vast majority of yeast extract spreads are made using von Liebig's traditional approach of heat-autolysis using surplus yeast from beer brewing, other methods do exist for producing specialized types.

In terms of fermentation, spent beer yeast is commonly contaminated with the bitter compounds from hops, requiring a "debittering" step to wash out most of this undesired flavor. Yeast from other sources are not affected by this issue. Spent brewer's yeast is also quite biodiverse, containing yeasts other than traditional Saccharomyces cerevisiae and sometimes beer spoilage-causing lactic acid bacteria too.

For disruption of the cell, some physical and chemical methods may be used in place of the heat-autolysis process. Doing so may allow specific compounds to be extracted or to produce an extract without the hydrolysis of cell contents (as in autolysis) happening. Autolysis can be assisted with added enzymes; for example, additional nuclease would enhance the release of nucleosides from RNA.

Separation removes insoluble parts, mainly the yeast's cell wall, from the extract. Cell wall can be separated into two commercially useful parts: the glucans as "yeast β-glucan" and the mannans further processed into mannan-oligosaccharide (MOS). The product is finally concentrated by drying, into a thick paste or a dry powder.

== Dietary concerns ==
Depending on the source, yeast extract may contain gluten. Brewer's yeast are especially likely to contain the protein due to contact with the grains used in brewing. In the case of yeast autolysate however, the yeast proteases are able to degrade most of the gluten. For example, Marmite contains around 30 part per million gluten according to third-party testing, meeting the EU "very low gluten" limit but not the "gluten free" definition. Unilever reports that no cases of gluten-related reactions have been reported for Marmite.

Yeast extract products derived from plant feedstock are by definition vegan and kosher–pareve, although some consumers prefer extra certification. They are also generally considered halal, despite the concern that the yeast has come into contact with alcohol.

== Use in food ==
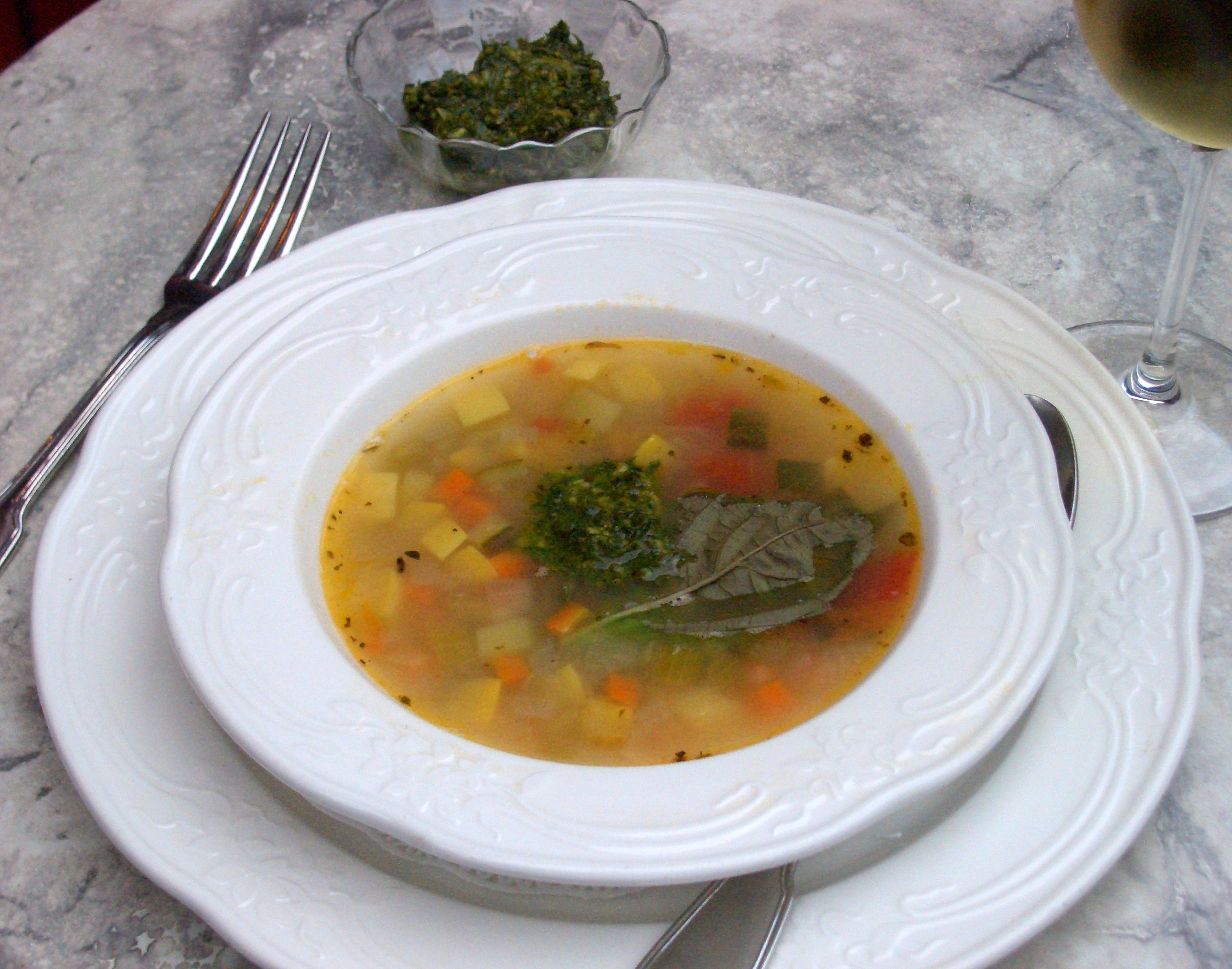
Yeast extract is a common ingredient in commercially prepared soups (canned, frozen, or deli). It is a flavor enhancer like monosodium glutamate (MSG).

Yeast autolysates are the main ingredient in AussieMite, Mightymite, Vegemite, Marmite, New Zealand Marmite, Promite, Cenovis, Vitam-R, Brazilian Cenovit and Maggi seasoning. Bovril (Ireland and the United Kingdom) switched from beef extract to yeast extract for 2005 and most of 2006, but later switched back.

Yeast extract is used as a flavoring in foods. It is a common ingredient in American barbecue-flavored potato chips such as Lay's. It is also widely used in soup bases.

=== Marmite ===
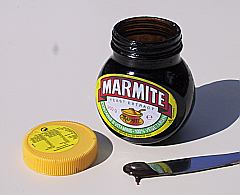
Marmite

Marmite (/ˈmɑːrmaɪt/ MAR-myte) is a British food spread produced by Unilever. Marmite has been produced since 1902. It is a sticky, dark brown food paste with a distinctive, powerful flavour, which is extremely salty. This distinctive taste is represented in the marketing slogan: "Love it or hate it." Such is its prominence in British popular culture that the product's name is often used as a metaphor for something that is an acquired taste or tends to polarise opinions.

In Australasia and the Pacific, British Marmite is sold as "Our Mate", due to the presence of a licensed Marmite produced in New Zealand.

=== Vegemite ===
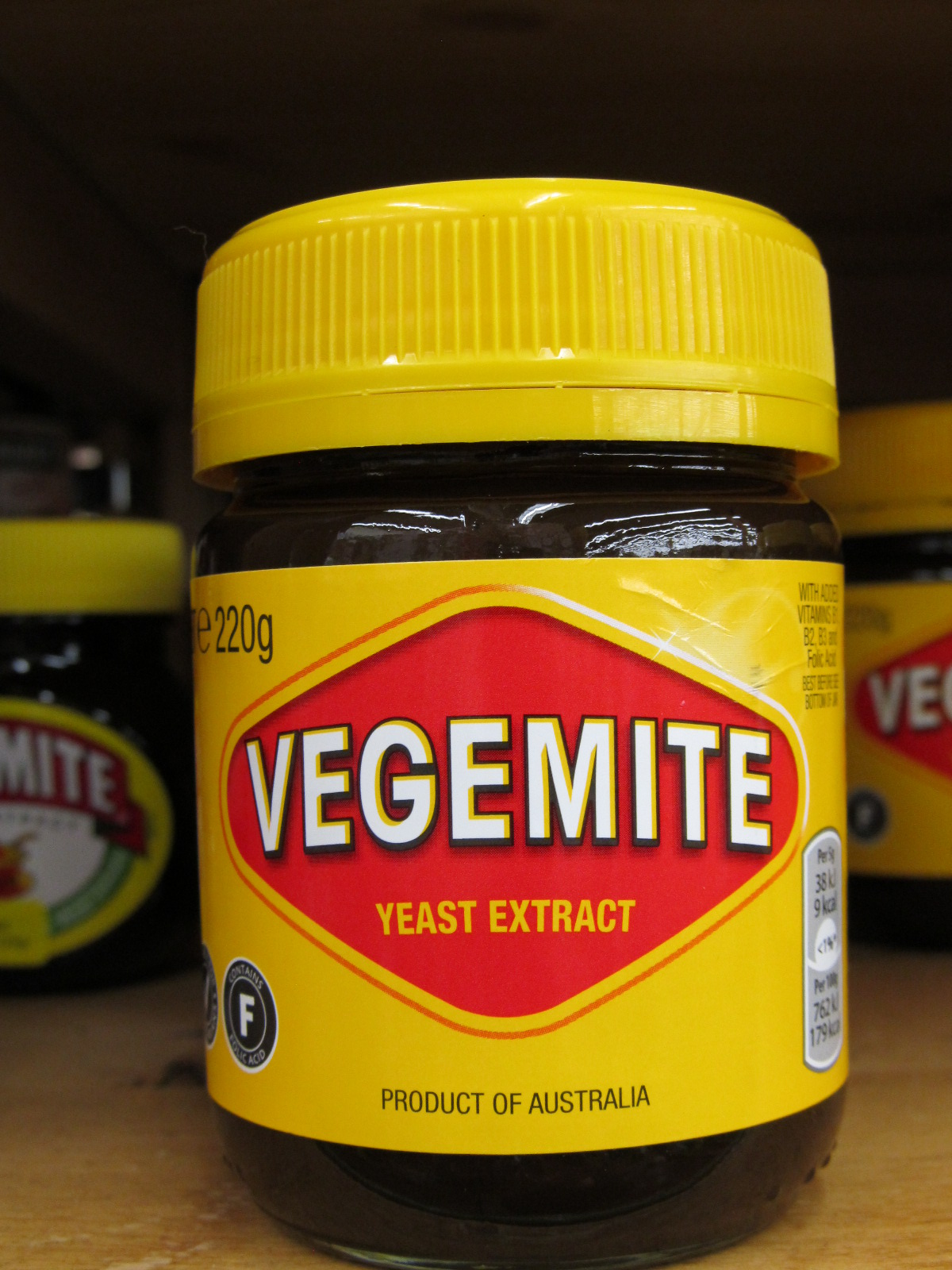

Vegemite (/ˈvɛdʒɪmaɪt/ VEJ-i-myte) is a thick, dark brown Australian food spread made from leftover brewers' yeast extract with various vegetable and spice additives. It was developed by Cyril Percy Callister in Melbourne, Victoria, in 1922. The Vegemite brand was owned by Mondelez International (formerly Kraft Foods Inc.) until January 2017, when it was acquired by the Australian Bega Cheese group in a US$460,000,000 (equivalent to about $604,000,000 in 2025) agreement for full Australian ownership after Bega would buy most of Mondelez International's Australia and New Zealand grocery and cheese business.

A spread for sandwiches, toast, crumpets and cracker biscuits as well as a filling for pastries, Vegemite is similar to British Marmite, New Zealand Marmite, Australian Promite, MightyMite, AussieMite, OzEmite, Brazilian Cenovit, German Vitam-R and Swiss Cenovis.

Vegemite is salty, slightly bitter, malty, and rich in glutamates giving it an umami flavour similar to beef bouillon. It is vegan, kosher and halal.

=== Marmite (New Zealand) ===
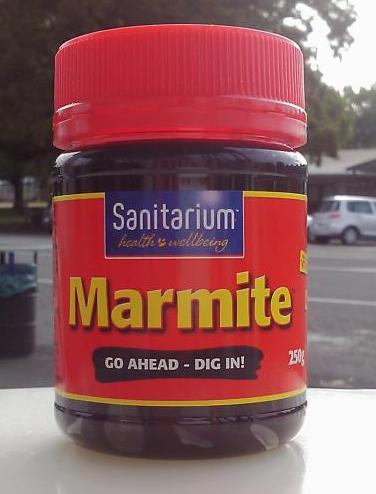

Marmite (/ˈmɑːrmaɪt/ MAR-myte) is a food spread produced in New Zealand by Sanitarium Health and Wellbeing Company and distributed in Australia and the Pacific. It is similar to the British Marmite, but the two products are made by different companies. This is the only product sold as Marmite in Australasia and the Pacific, whereas elsewhere in the world the British version predominates. In the rest of the world it is sold as "NZ-Mite".

Marmite has been manufactured in New Zealand since 1919. The product's popularity in England prompted the Sanitarium Health Food Company to obtain sole rights to distribute the product in New Zealand and Australia in 1908. They later began manufacturing Marmite under licence in Christchurch, albeit using a modified version of the original recipe, most notable for its inclusion of sugar and caramel. Common ingredients are also slightly different quantities from the British version; the New Zealand version has high levels of potassium, for example. New Zealand Marmite is described as having a "weaker" or "less tangy" flavour than the British version.

=== Vitam-R ===
Vitam-R
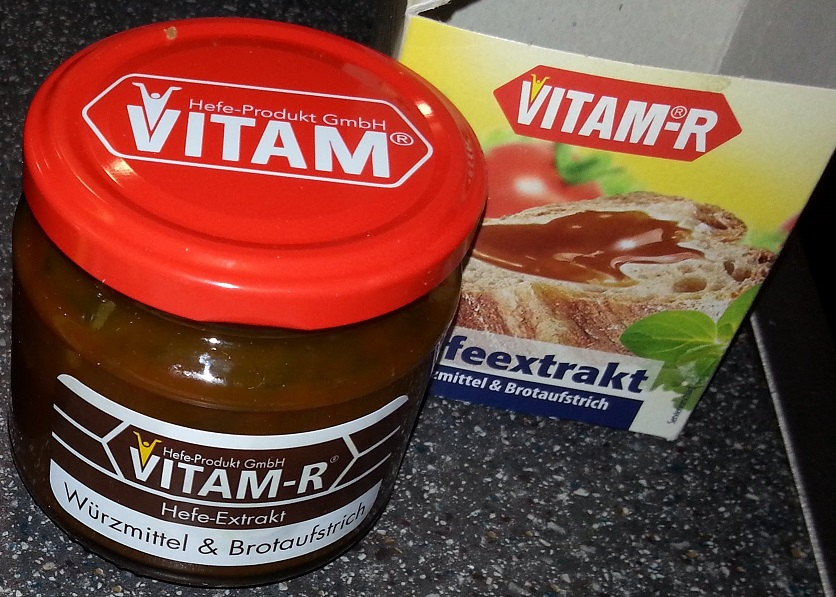
- Type: Yeast spread
- Place of origin: Germany
- Invented: 1925
- Main ingredients: Yeast extract
- Variations: Kräuter (Herbs)
- Food energy (per 100 serving): 223 kcal (930 kJ)
Nutritional value
(per 100 serving)
- Protein: 29.8 g
- Fat: 0.3 g
- Carbohydrate: 25.1 g
- Similar dishes: Marmite, Vegemite

Vitam-R is a savory yeast extract spread made in Hameln, Germany, by the company Vitam Hefe-Produkt GmbH. It was first developed by Rückforth AG in Stettin (today's Szczecin, Poland) in 1925, following the discovery by Justus von Liebig that yeast could be concentrated. It is sometimes described as having a smoother flavour than similar products such as Marmite, Vegemite, or Cenovis. Unlike those brands, Vitam-R is not an iconic part of its home country's cuisine, but it, too, is described as having a love-it-or-hate-it flavour. It is both vegan and by extension, vegetarian, and is sold primarily in Reformhaus health-food stores.

=== Cenovis ===
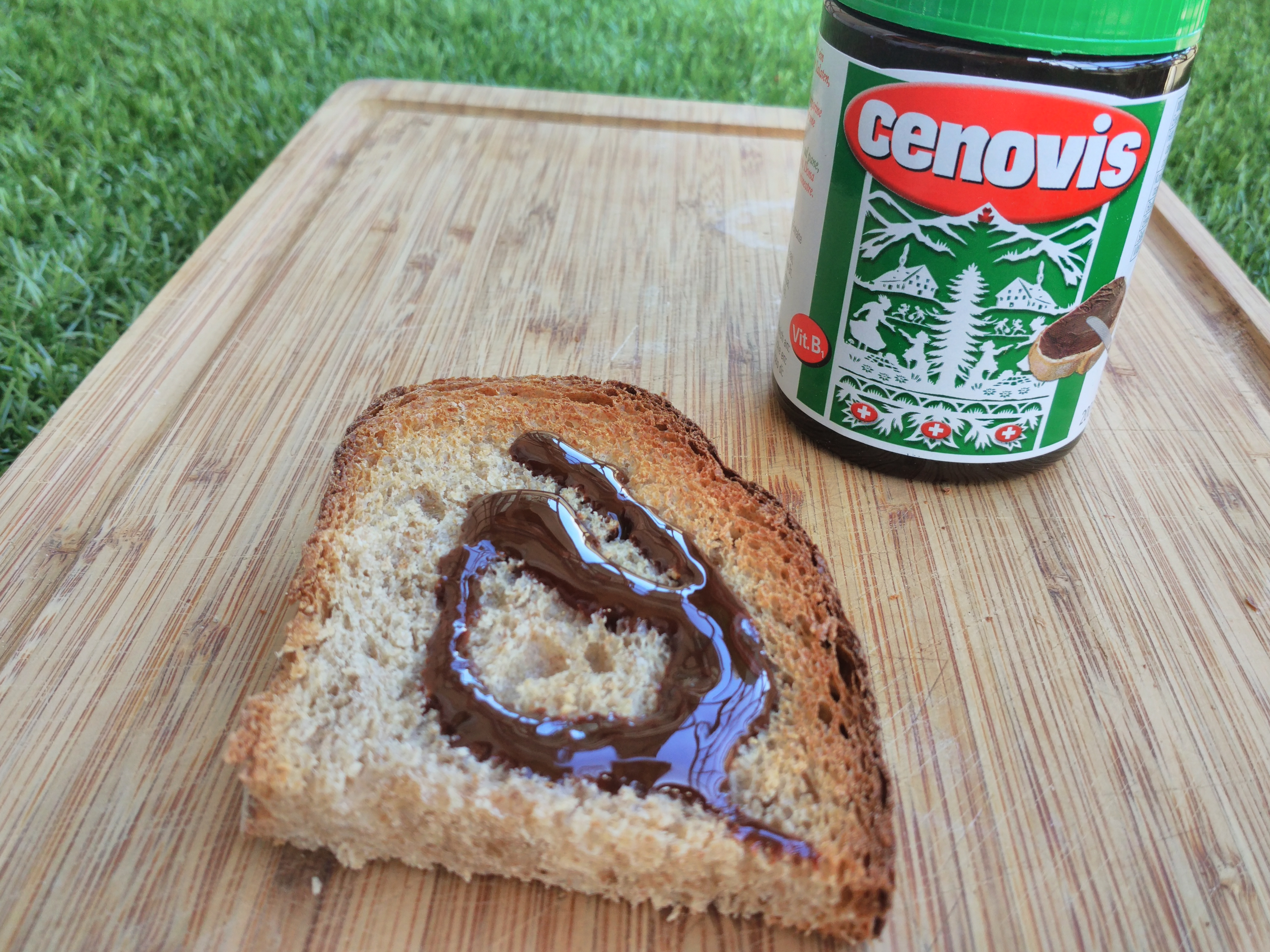
Cenovis on bread, with jar in the background

Cenovis is a product based on yeast extract that is similar to Marmite and Vegemite, rich in vitamin B_{1}. In the form of a dark brown food paste, it is used to flavour soups, sausages and salads. The most popular way to consume Cenovis, however, is to spread it on a slice of buttered bread, as stated on the product's packaging (it can also be blended directly into butter, and then spread on bread, or used as a filling in croissants and buns).

Cenovis is popular in Switzerland (particularly Romandie). It was developed in Rheinfelden in 1931, on the initiative of a master brewer named Alex Villinger, and was subsequently produced by the company Cenovis SA.

== Other uses ==
The nutrition-rich nature of yeast extract lends it to a variety of uses. It was historically popular as a vitamin supplement for humans. Rich in proteins and nucleotides, it currently finds use in animal feed and microbiology (see yeast extract agar) as nutritional supplements. It also finds use in cosmetics and skincare products due to its alleged moisturizing and antioxidant properties.

== See also ==
- Meat extract
- Hydrolyzed protein
- Hydrolyzed vegetable protein
- Monosodium Glutamate
- Umami
- Protein isolate
