= Reformhaus =

Type of retail store in Germany

neuform Vereinigung Deutscher Reformhäuser eG
- Company type: Cooperative of Reformhaus owners
- Founded: 1927
- Headquarters: Zarrentin, Mecklenburg-Vorpommern, Germany
- Products: Vegetarian groceries (mostly also organic), cosmetics and personal care products, over-the-counter pharmaceuticals
- Revenue: ▲€ 605 million (2006)
- Website: reformhaus.de

Reformhaus (German pronunciation: [ʁeˈfɔʁmˌhaʊ̯s]; "reform house") is a type of German retail store that specializes in groceries and personal care products according to the principles of the 19th-century Lebensreform movement, for example the products are vegetarian, often (but not necessarily) organic, and free of synthetic preservatives. In English-speaking countries, this particular form of retail shop is usually called a health food store. However, there are also other health food stores in Germany called Naturkostladen, which are the exact equivalent of a health food store, and not generally connected to the Reformhaus stores.

One of the first Reformhaus stores opened in Wuppertal in 1900. In 1927 the neuform cooperative of Reformhaus owners was founded. This cooperative became responsible for central purchasing, quality assurance, and marketing. The Reformhaus stores are independently operated by their respective owners, either as independent stores or regional chains, but since the branding is owned by neuform, all store owners have to be members of the cooperative in order to be allowed to call their store Reformhaus.

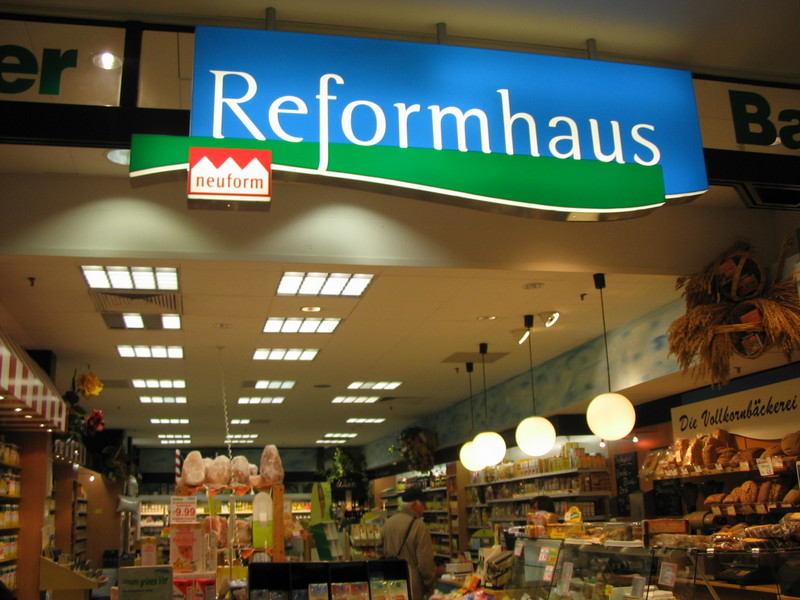
Entrance of a Reformhaus store

As of January 2007, there were 1,662 Reformhäuser in Germany and a total of 2,980 retail outlets in Germany and Austria.

It was reported in 2009 that Reformhaus revenues were in decline as other German organic grocers took away business, probably because grocery selection in a Reformhaus is typically relatively limited. To counter this development, a new flagship store with a larger floor area and product selection was opened in Frankfurt.

== Reformhaus-Fachakademie ==
In 1956, the Reformhaus-Fachakademie was founded in Oberursel, an education center that serves both aspiring Reformhaus owners and their staff and the wider community. The center offers seminars on topics such as nutrition, traditional Chinese medicine, and ecology.
