= Cenovis =

Swiss brand of spread similar to Marmite

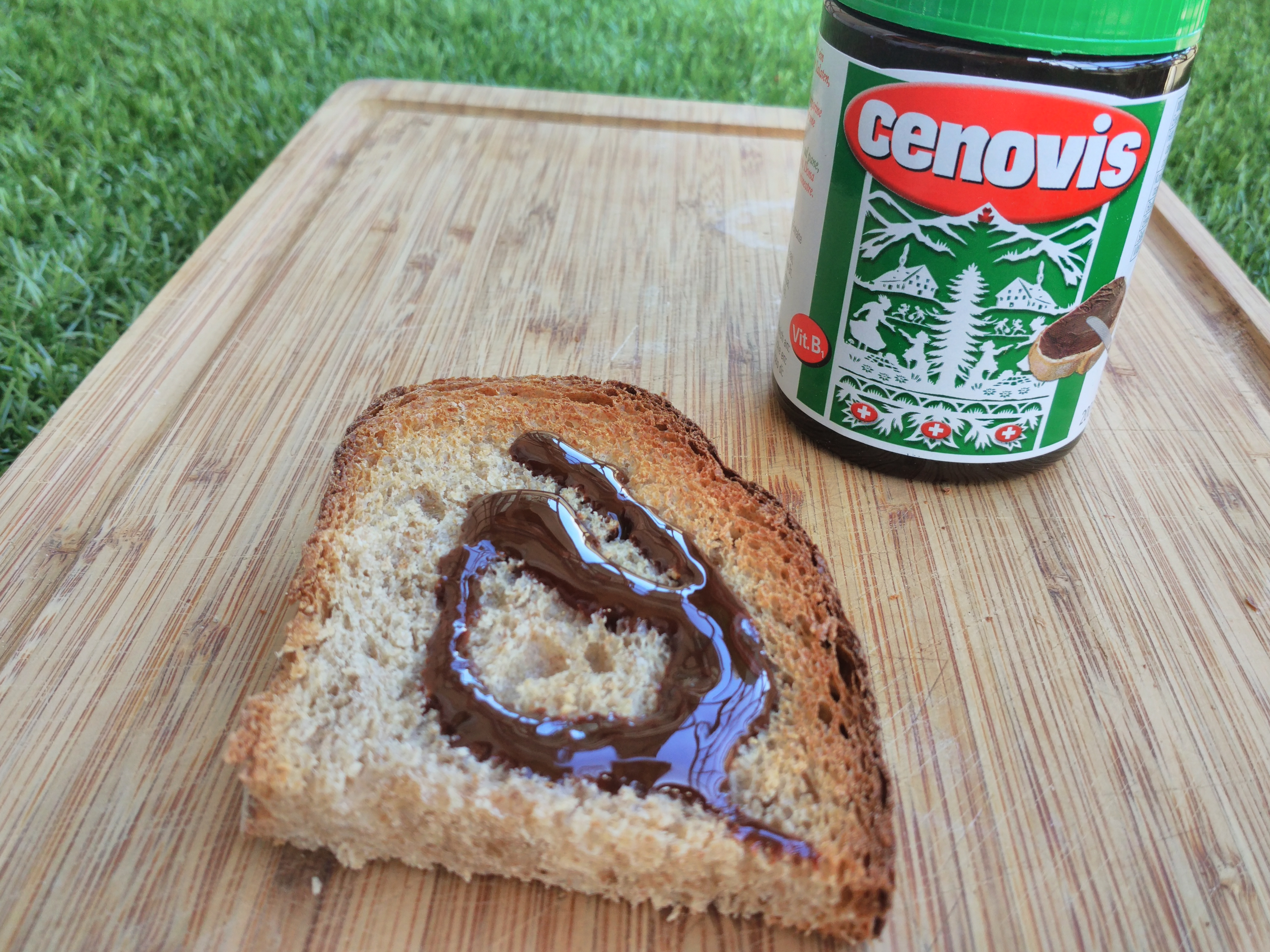
- Cenovis on bread, with jar in the background
- Type: Spread
- Place of origin: Switzerland
- Region or state: Rheinfelden
- Created by: Alex Villinger
- Invented: 1931
- Main ingredients: Yeast extract

Cenovis is a dark brown food paste from Switzerland consisting of yeast extract, onions, carrots and spices. Sold internationally under the brand Sonaris, it is similar to English Marmite, Brazilian Cenovit, and Australian Vegemite. Rich in vitamin B_{1}, it may be used to flavour soups, sausages, and salads. The most popular way to consume Cenovis, however, is to spread it on a slice of buttered bread, as stated on the product's packaging. It can also be blended into butter and used as a spread or a filling for croissants and buns.

The company does not disclose whether the Swiss Cenovis was a licensed product from the older German one. In contrast to comparable yeast extracts, the Swiss Cenovis, similar to Thomy mustard, was sold in tubes early on and is somewhat lighter and more liquid.

== Protein versus vitamin ==
Since the beginning of the 20th century many attempts to turn brewer's yeast into food have been made. The main reason being its availability and nutritional physiology. The English Marmite (1902) and the Australian Vegemite (1922) became successful as products. 1912 Casimir Funk discovered an active ingredient against deficiency diseases which he called vitamin. The high thiamine content (vitamin B_{1}) then became the quality of nutritional yeast that was more effective in advertising than its protein content, which had been known for a long time.

== Origins in Germany ==
In 1915, Cenovis Nahrungsmittelwerke GmbH was founded in Munich as a brewer's yeast and malt factory, which also produced by-products of these products and other foods such as oatmeal and baking powder, making it one of Maggi's main competitors. The German Cenovis vitamin extract was available from around 1920 in jars labeled "unbegrenzt haltbar" (unlimited shelf life).

The image of the Cenovis products was associated with the life reform movement (from which the Reformhäuser emerged). It was reported in 1921 that the Cenovis yeast extract consisted of cleaned and de-bittered brewer's yeast and had a honey-like consistency. It has a "similar, only finer taste than Liebig's meat extract". The founder and main shareholder of Cenovis, Julius Schülein, a son of the brewery owner Joseph Schülein, reports in his book from 1938 (the year when his Munich company was expropriated by Aryanization and he emigrated to the USA) about an Cenovis vitamin yeast produced in Switzerland. In the same year, the Australian trademark Cenovis was established.

== Swiss manufacturing ==
Cenovis is popular in Switzerland (particularly Romandie). It was developed in Rheinfelden in 1931, on the initiative of a master brewer named Alex Villinger. Since 1935, they have been producing Cenovis extract alongside brewer's yeast and other by-products. In 1955, Cenovis became part of the Swiss Army's survival ration. In 1965, Vitamin-Hefe AG acquired all of the word marks and manufacturing processes from Cenovis-Werke GmbH in Munich. The foreign trademark rights were sold to the Hügli Group in Steinach SG. The Heirler Cenovis GmbH that emerged from it has a similar range of products as the Munich Cenovis of the time.

== Revival ==
Cenovis yeast extract was developed during times of economic crisis, aimed at replacing meat products like sausages. It is economical, long-lasting without refrigeration, and shares similarities with the Australian spread Vegemite. However, unlike Vegemite, which has become a staple in the harsh environment of the Australian outback, Cenovis has seen a decline in sales in Switzerland. In German-speaking Switzerland, it remains popular among the older generation, while in French-speaking Switzerland, it only gained traction after being relaunched by Michel Yagchi in 1999, with the help of Didier Fischer and Frank Guemara, who applied modern marketing techniques to rejuvenate the brand.

On 29 February 2008, Michel Yagchi transferred the brand, acquired in 1999, to Gustav Gerig AG, an Aargau company, and the product thereby returned to its canton of origin.

Cenovis has been manufactured by Sonaris AG in Arisdorf BL since 2008. Sonaris AG was founded in Rheinfelden AG in 1997 as the successor company to Leiber Vitamin-Hefe AG. From then on, the production rights for the production of the Cenovis extract were held by the company Sonaris AG, which relocated its headquarters from Rheinfelden to Arisdorf in 2003. In 2008, Cenovis' Swiss trademark rights were bought back by Sonaris AG. International distribution, notably in France, uses the Sonaris brand instead. In 2013, the two companies Cenovis AG and Sonaris AG merged to form today's Cenovis AG, based in Arisdorf.

The company presents the following story behind Cenovis:

"In 1931, a brewer recycled the yeast used for the fermentation of beer: vegetal substances very rich in vitamin B_{1}. After several tests, the product was perfected and a group of Swiss brewers launched Cenovis; the product was an immediate success and the famous spread was so good that from 1955 it was included in the rations for Swiss soldiers... Healthy and strong soldiers!"

== See also ==
- Culinary Heritage of Switzerland
- List of brand name condiments
- List of spreads
- Marmite
- Promite
- Vegemite
- Vitam-R
