= South Chilcotin Mountains Provincial Park =

Provincial park in British Columbia, Canada

- IUCN category II (national park)
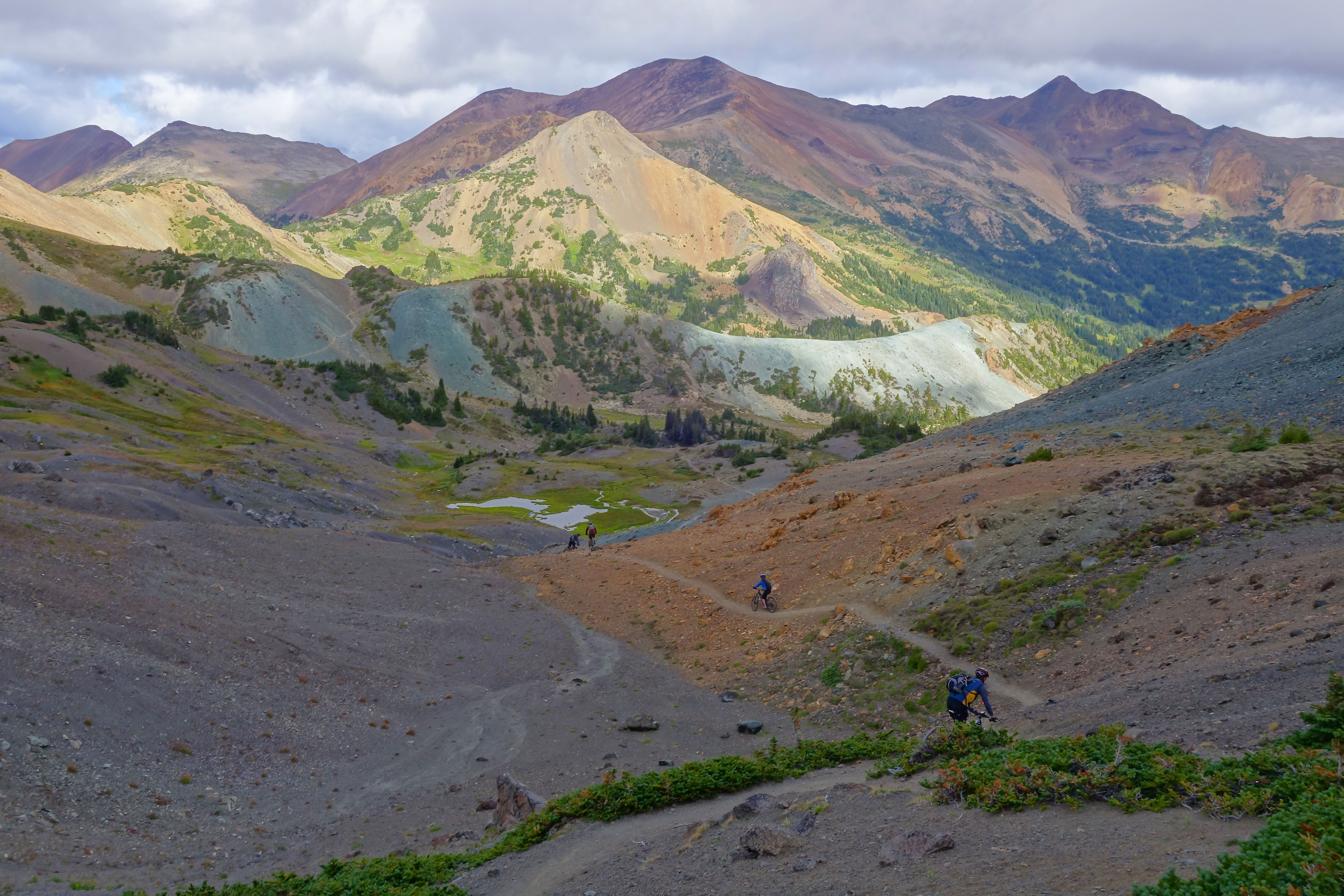
- The Chilcotin Ranges exhibit vibrant colours from heavy mineralization

- Location within British Columbia
- Interactive map of South Chilcotin Mountains Provincial Park
- Location: Squamish-Lillooet, British Columbia, Canada
- Coordinates: 51°02′51″N 123°03′21″W
- Area: 56,796 ha (219.29 sq mi)
- Established: April 18, 2001
- Governing body: BC Parks

South Chilcotin Mountains Provincial Park is a provincial park in British Columbia, Canada, located on Highway 40 northwest of Lillooet, British Columbia. The park, which is 56,796 ha. in size, was established on April 18, 2001, and It was created out of a portion of the Spruce Lake Protected Area. The park is located on three Indigenous Nations: The Tsilhqot’in, St’at’imc, and Secwepemc.

The park has mid elevation grasslands, sub alpine and alpine meadows, alpine lakes and mountain peaks, and complete watersheds. It also has trails through valleys, alpine meadows and ridges.

Diverse habitats support an abundance of species, including mountain goats, mule deer, grizzly bears, California bighorn sheep, and moose. The vegetation and geology of the area are equally varied.

== Climate ==
The dominant climate of the Chilcotin Highlands and Ranges is a leeward-rainy climate, influenced by wet coastal air from the west, cold plateau air from the north, and dry interior air from the east. The South Chilcotin Mountain Park is located on the leeward side of the major coastal ranges and has less precipitation relative to the mountains to the west.

The South Chilcotin Mountain Park has moderate temperatures and low precipitation during the spring and summer seasons. The fall and winter seasons are influenced by warm Pacific air, resulting in cooler temperatures and higher precipitation. The growing season is short, lasting approximately 3–4 months from the end of spring to the end of summer.

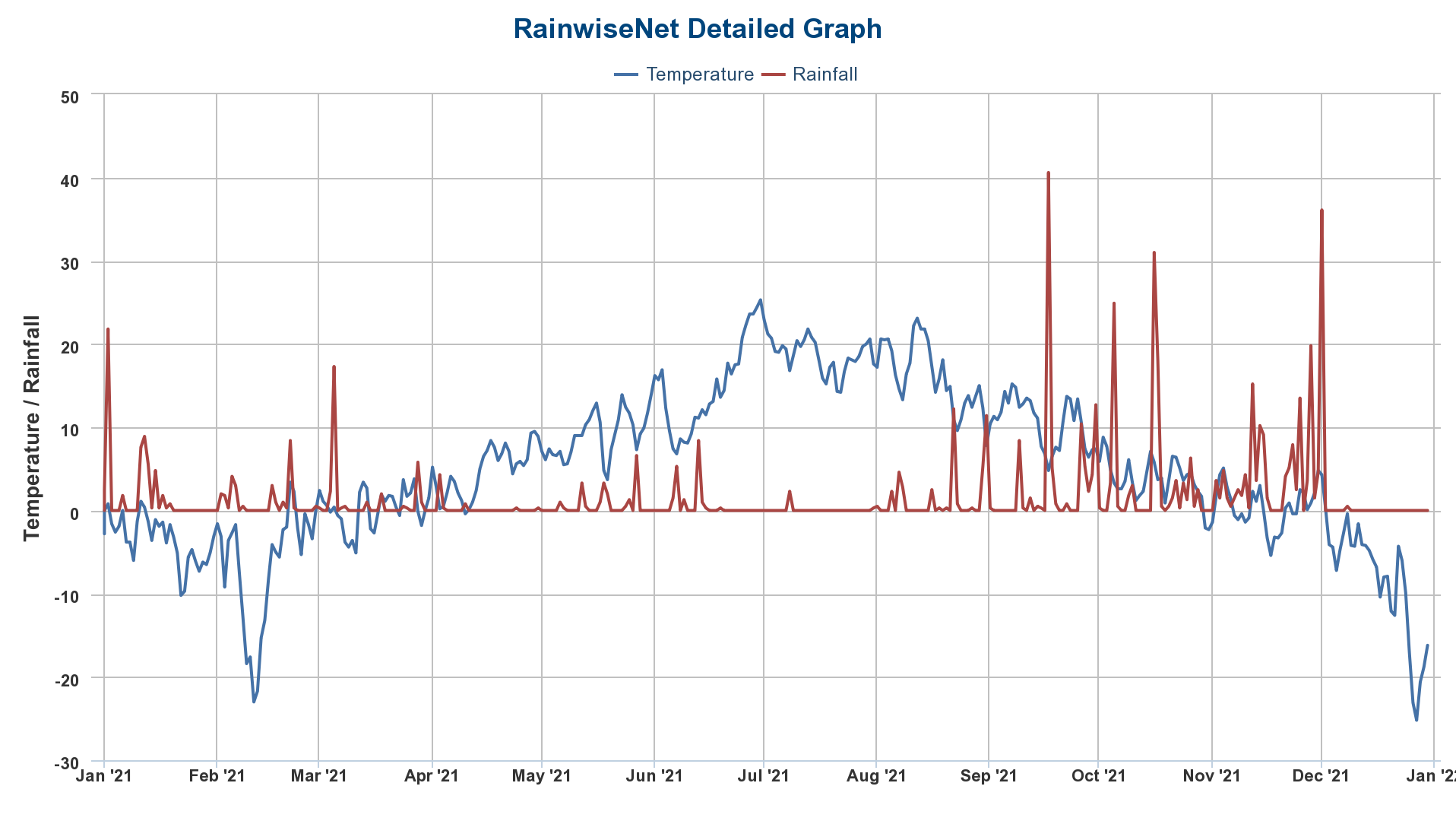
Temperature and Rainfall Graph of South Chilcotin Mountain in 2021

At lower elevations, there is frost in most months; at higher elevations, frost is almost daily. Winds are present throughout the year, more at higher elevations. The different amounts of precipitation on the two sides of the mountain and the variation in temperature due to elevation create distinct environments in The South Chilcotin Mountain Park, resulting in biodiversity regarding plants and wildlife.

== Ecology ==
=== Vegetation ===
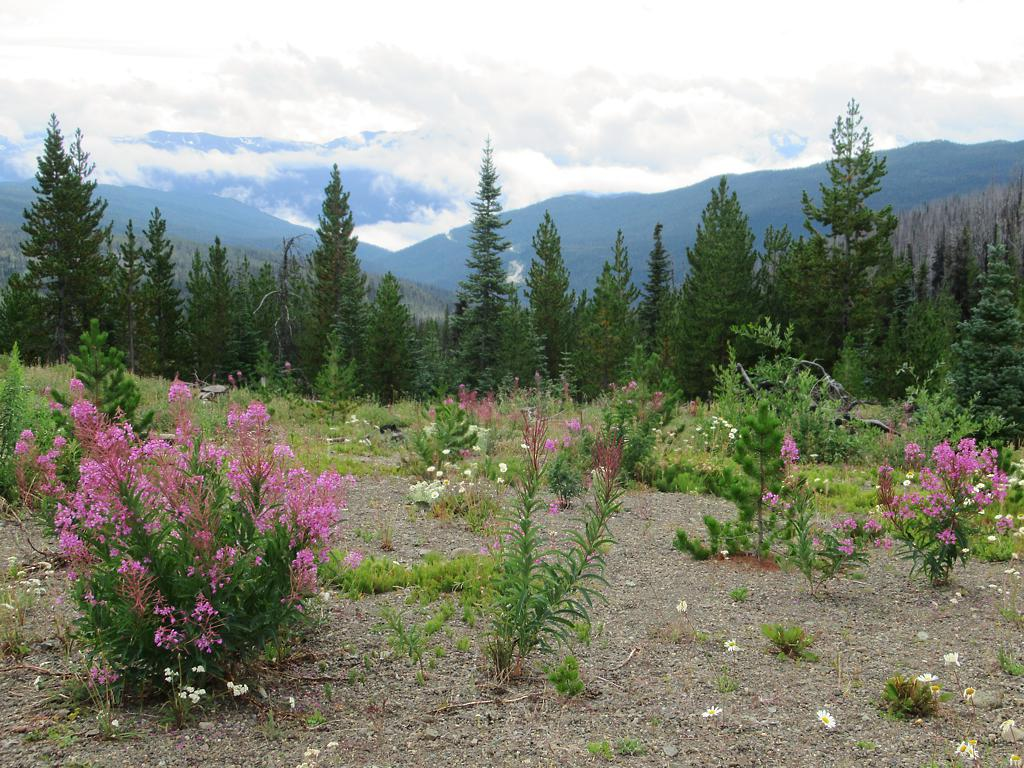
Fireweed flower growing in open meadow.

The South Chilcotin Mountain Provincial Park is a region that is home to seven of thirteen of British Columbia's forested biogeoclimatic zones, giving the area a wide range of biodiversity. It is part of the Spruce Lake Protected Area, which stretches 71,000 ha (175,000 acres) to give many plants and species a place to thrive in a community and protect old growth forests. The valleys are home to an abundance of old growth spruce and pine forests, connecting to significant mid-elevation grasslands, surrounded by wildflower meadows, where more than 125 endemic species of wildflowers can bloom.

=== Ecosystem ===
The alpine tundra is the highest elevation of the mountain range, and dominates the area by 60% and is accompanied by permanent snow, glaciers and large areas of bare rock, giving a short growing season for dwarf-like plants that grow small and have short flowering periods.

The Engelmann Spruce-subalpine fir zone (ESSF), located below the tundra, is a continuous forest composed of conifers with Engelmann spruce, alpine fir in drier sites, and white bark pine and lodgepole pine in wet sites. The most common shrub found in this zone is the white-flowered rhododendron, followed by black huckleberry, grouseberry, and false azalea. The meadows are dominated by heath, flowers and grasslands. Snow can linger long enough in this zone to provide moisture for the Indian hellebore, arrow-leaved groundsel, paintbrush, sitka valerian, and many other herbs.

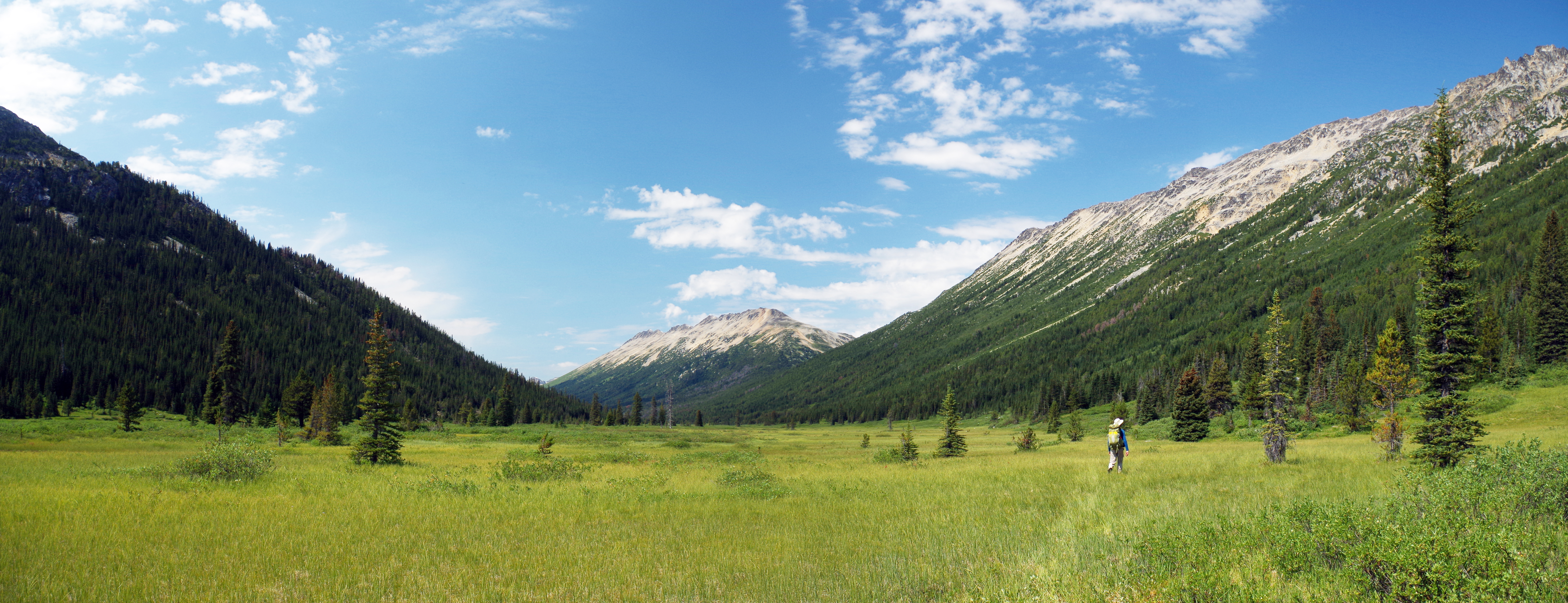
Meadow in South Chilcotin Mountain

The Montane Spruce Zone is located under the Engelmann spruce-subalpine fir zone and is the drier and colder area of the mountain range. Open forests are mixed with lodgepole pine, Engelmann spruce and subalpine fir. Towards the north slopes, Engelmann spruce and subalpine fir create dense forests with some Douglas fir and lodgepole pine which are located on the north facing slopes and surrounded by bluebunch wheatgrass, common juniper, kinnikinnick and balsamroot. Then, towards the western sections, there is scattered ponderosa pine.

The Interior Douglas-Fir Zone is located at the lowest section of the park and is the driest ecosystem of the zones. It has open forests with lodge-pole pine and regeneration of Douglas fir, surrounded by Saskatoon berry bushes, birch-leaved spirea and bluebunch wheatgrass habit on the dry south facing slopes. Some birch-leaved spirea and falsebox are found with lots of pinegrass meadows.

=== Indigenous peoples and history with the vegetation ===
For the Indigenous peoples and communities of the Tsilhqot’in, St’at’imc, and Secwepemc Nations, they would go in large groups to go harvest kinnikinnick, soapberries, Saskatoon, chokecherry and low bush berry and use them for food and medicinal purposes. In regards to the trees such as lodgepole pine and white spruce, the inner bark would be scraped and eaten. Endemic plant species such as the spring beauty, yellow avalanche lily, wild onion, chocolate lily, balsamroot, dandelion and prickly-pear cactus were all important stables to the communities.

=== Climate change and endangered plant species ===
Due to the altering changes in the temperature, the ecosystems are affected, putting endemic vegetation and patterns at risk. Mountain pine beetles have made their way into the larger area of lodgepole pine and whitebark pine. This increases the chances of forest fires and overall ecosystem function, and also affects fellow species that rely on the seeds of vegetation that are high energy food sources. There is also conflict with other species such as cattle and horses that graze along the grasslands and meadows, causing damage to the habitat. Invasive species are being managed, but there still is difficulty with recreational activities and grazing that spread invasive plants such as burdock and houndstongue.

== Wildlife ==
=== Birds ===
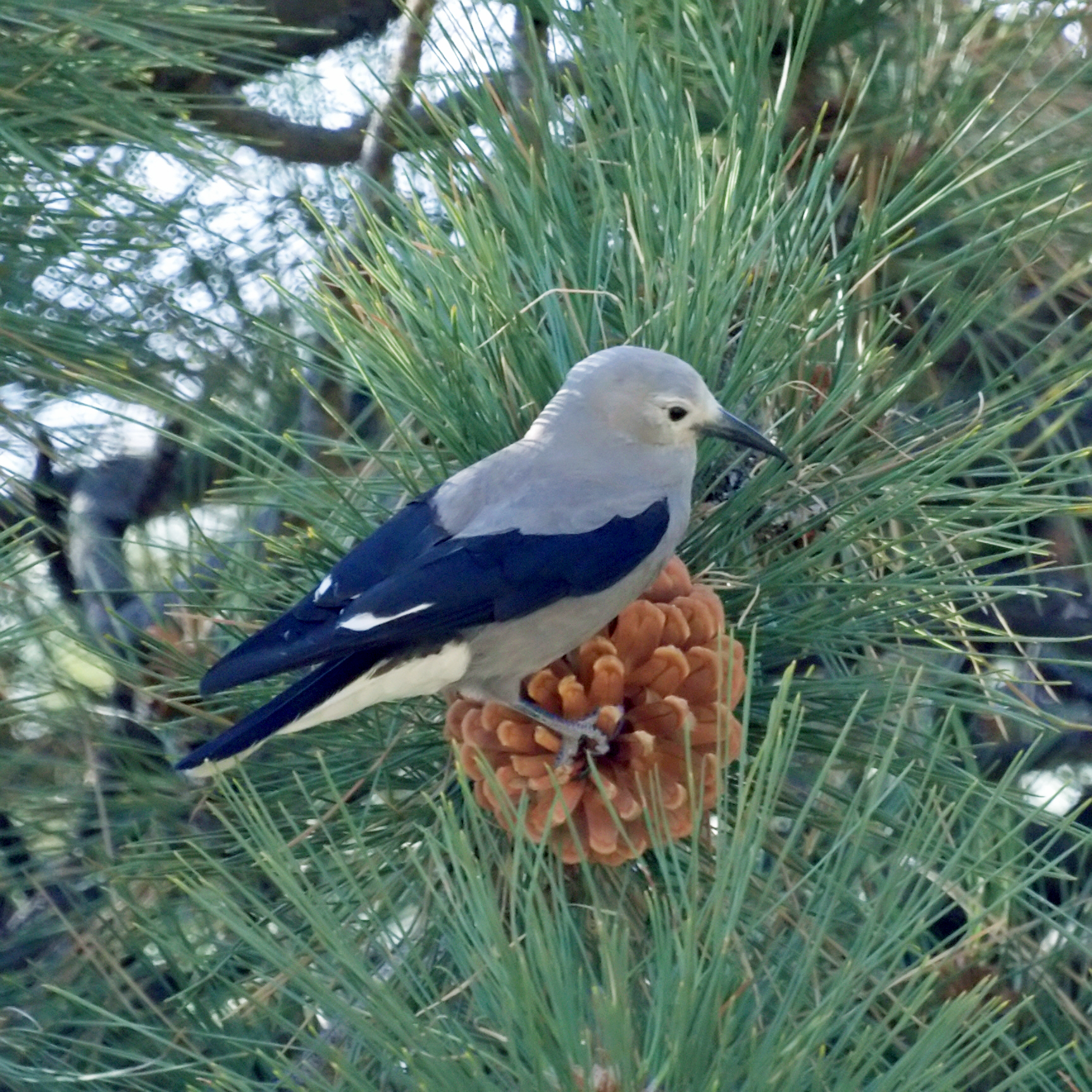
Clark's nutcracker retrieving seed from pine trees

Habitats surround this high-elevation mountain area with low-growing seasons; the cold freezes many lakes and plants, restricting their access to food and water. This climate would render it impossible for many bird species to survive.

In this range, horned larks (registered as endangered since July 14, 2005) and American pipits live in alpine habitats, announcing their arrival as snow melts and departing before the snowfall begins. Horned larks are sandy to rusty brown, while American pipits are small with a grey top and striped bottom. Other species, like white-tailed ptarmigan, are endemic to the mountains, where they have designated the southern limit. Among the species that can adapt to high elevations are the Franklin's, blue and ruffed grouse, red crossbills, white-winged crossbills, gray jay, Steller's jay, and pine grosbeaks. Whitebark pine (registered endangered since June 20, 2012) can be eaten by Clark's nutcrackers, whose seeds are harvested from the pine.

The gyrfalcon, the northern harrier and red-tailed hawk, the Swainson's hawk, the bald eagle, and the golden eagles are predators that serve different prey-predator relationships. Golden eagles, distributed equally throughout the world, surprise attack their prey to feed on small mammals and larger prey such as marmots, ground squirrels, seals, and coyotes. Other species like the great gray owl, great horned owl, three-toed, black-backed, pileated, and hairy woodpeckers are common in the mountain all year round.

=== Insects ===
There are few insect databases available; some relevant insect populations are the Bristly tachinid flies, flower flies, Sarcophagid flies, blow files, swallowtail butterflies, and ladybird beetles. Mountain tops are crowded with insects during mating season, where they stay for only a moment before returning to their preferred habitats. The ladybird beetle hibernates in elevated and warm areas to avoid the cold throughout the winter.

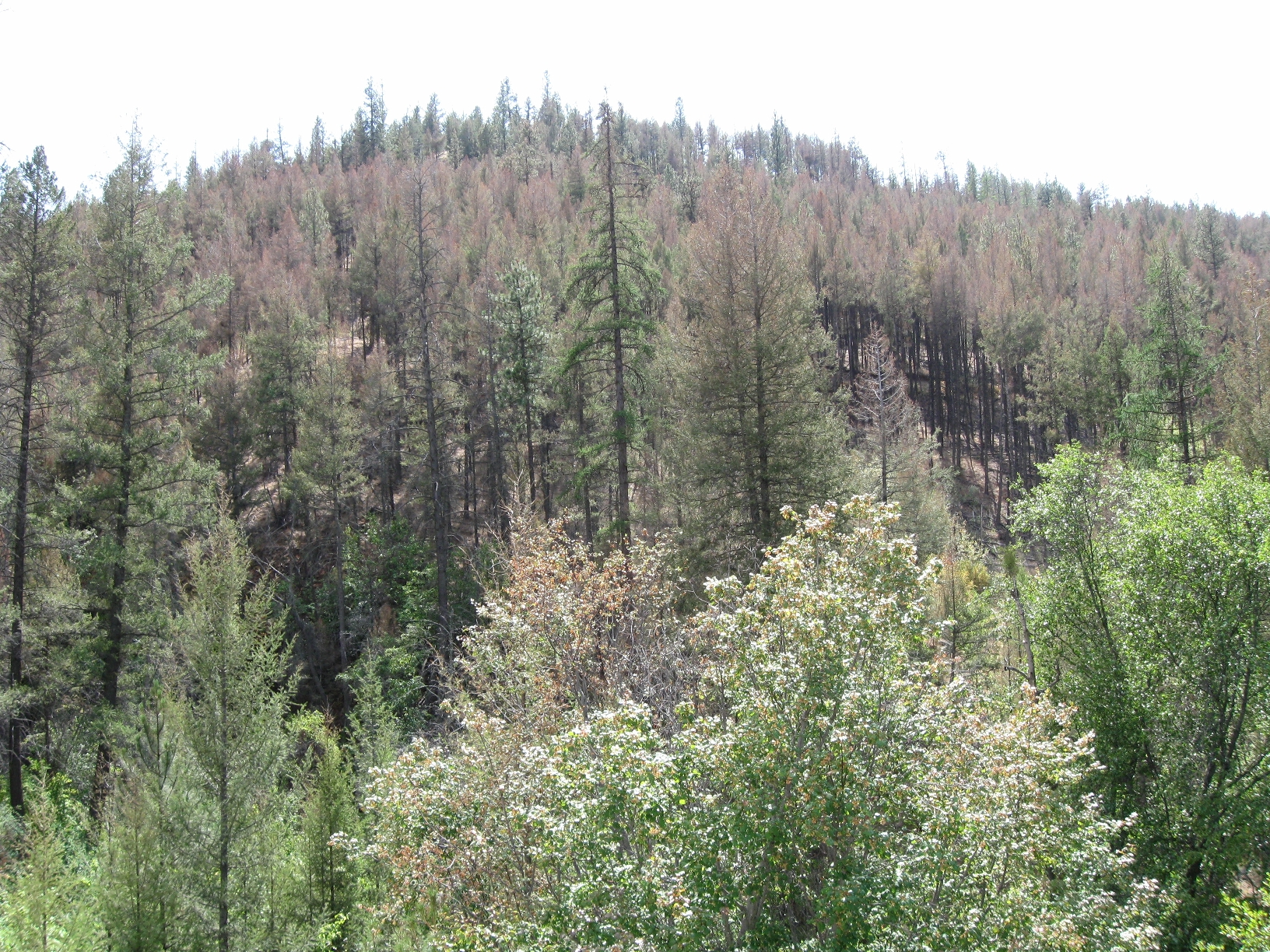
Mountain Pine Beetle damage to trees

Mountain pine beetles create adversities with the lodgepole tree population. Pine trees in British Columbia are experiencing a pine beetle invasion on a landscape level. Lodgepole pine trees are attacked by these beetles yearly, and their larvae build up inside the trees. Over time, healthier trees are becoming increasingly difficult to compete with mountain pine beetles.

=== Mammals ===
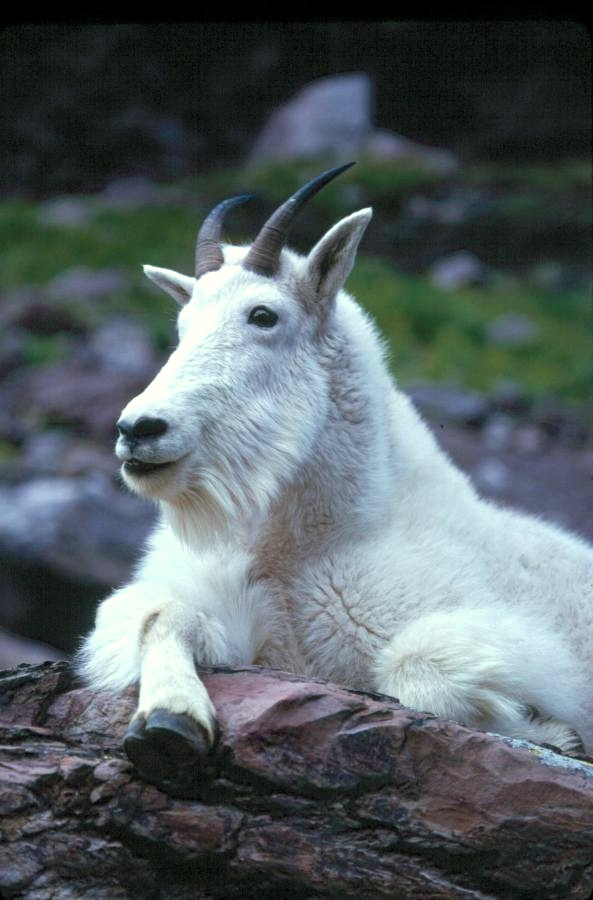
Mountain Goat resting on rocks.

According to information provided by the BC Parks website, the diversity of terrains in the South Chilcotin mountains helps foster numerous groups of mammals, creating a diverse ecosystem in which interaction through species is crucial for the maintenance of the land. Throughout the year, mammals have the opportunity to share the land with other species, and as a result, mountain goats, grizzly bears, mule deer, California bighorn sheep, and moose all share the Eldorado-Taylor-Cinnabar Basin area, located at the eastern part of the park.

Mountain goats are often located in Eldorado mountain which is located in the east-southern part of the park, characterized by undisturbed areas which favour the basic needs for birthing and breeding, as well as serving for hunting, and security cover over predators, this habitat meets all the species’ requirements. During winter, these creatures can be found on the west-facing slopes of Gun Creek from lower Windy Pass to lower Eldorado Creek, where they find shelter and security along with California bighorn sheep.

California bighorn sheep are considered to be part of BC's blue list, which according to BC's website, means that they are considered a species of special concern. Due to historical over-harvesting by legal and illegal hunting, as well as habitat degradation over time thanks to fire suppression, the invasion of non-native plants, intensive cattle grazing, etc. Some of this species’ populations can find shelter and forage plants in the west part of Mt. Sheba over the ridges of the upper Tyaughton valley into Little Paradise and along the Tyaughton ridge towards Castle Peak. During winter the characteristics of the park's habitats provide an essential environment for these mammals to consider reproduction, as well as shelter in the dry tundra areas.

Mule deer are another important species that habit the lands of the park, mainly having a meticulous diet, this species principally feeds from herbaceous plants and woody shrubs. During summer and fall, the populations of mule deer can be found in the open forests, clearings, and wetlands around Spruce Lake and Gun Creek grasslands, which provide the ideal environment for shelter and feeding. While in winter migration corridors allow more individuals to travel through Lone Valley Creek to Tyaughton Creek and through Dash Creek to upper Relay Creek.

During summer, moose can usually be found in the valley bottoms and wet meadows that the South Chilcotin Mountains provide. The species are principally attracted to the park's forests of Gun Creek and Tyaughton Creek, where swamps and wetlands foster the growth of deciduous plants which are known to be the main diet of these mammals.

For grizzly bears, the ideal habitat characterizes of large undisturbed areas mainly found in avalanche slopes, wetlands and meadows. While lacking areas for fishing, the park provides numerous places where the main diet of glacier lilies, whitebark pine, skunk cabbage, and berries are available, as well as being perfect locations for denning.

== Geology ==
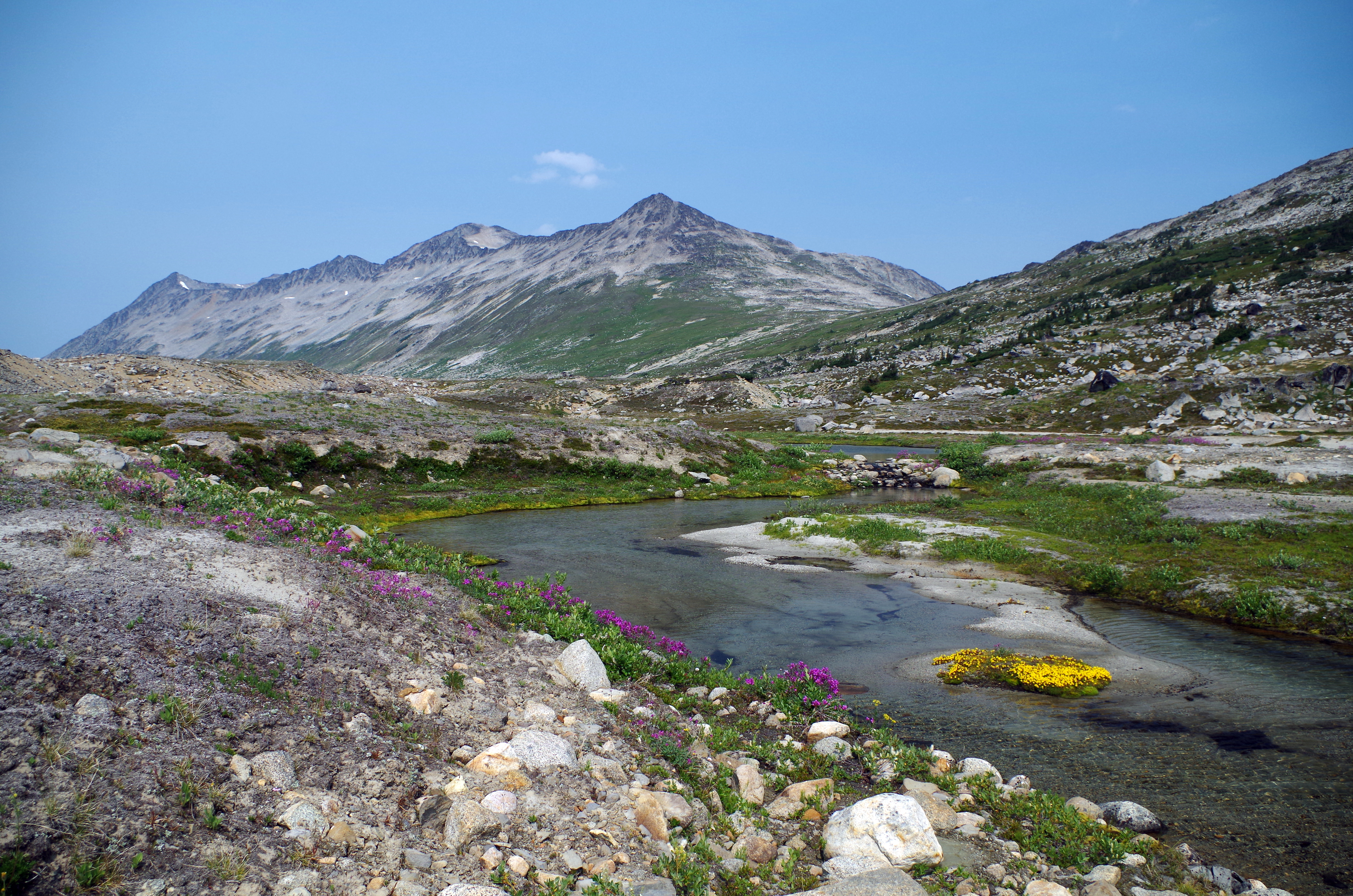
Landscape of The South Chilcotin Mountain

South Chilcotin Mountain Park is dominated by gently sloping valleys and dome-shaped mountains with some higher rugged peaks in the range. The park was created in 2010 from a portion of the Spruce Lake Protected Area and has a system of pathways connecting various terrains and different elevations for visitors to access. The main tourism sites in South Chilcotin Mountain Park include Spruce Lake, Pearson Pond, and Taylor Basin. Spruce Lake was known as South Chilcotin Mountain Provincial Park until 2007, when it was relegated to protected area. There is a walking path around the lake that crosses Tyax Creek. The lake is ideal for fishing and swimming in the summer. Pearson Pond is the center of a network of hiking paths within South Chilcotin Mountain Park. Pond side roads provide access to Mowsen Pond, Pearson River, Tyax Lake, and Carpenter Lake. Taylor Basin is crossed by Cinnabar Creek and Mud Creek. The route is designed for hiking up to the summit to access the views.

South Chilcotin Mountain Park extends across the Southeast Coast Range and the Chilcotin Plateau with a complex geological history covering many eras of rock and geological processes. The geological history of South Chilcotin Mountain Park specifically includes ancient ocean deposits, tectonic plate movement, faulting and mixing of rocks and layers of rocks, deposition of sedimentary rocks in shallow-marine basins, upwellings of granitic rocks and lava flows.

The table below lists the most prominent mountains, and typical geological history in South Chilcotin Mountain Park.

| | Relay Mountains | Sorcerer | Porteau Mountain | Mount Sheba | Dash Hill | Gun Mountain | Copper Mountain | Red Hill | Mount Gunningham | Tepee Mountain | Castle Peak | Leckie Range |
|---|---|---|---|---|---|---|---|---|---|---|---|---|
| Height | 2709 m | 2600 m | 2727 m | 2665 m | 2513 m | 2623 m | 2603 m | 2569 m | 2546 m | 2507 m | 2492 m | 2278 m |
| Prominence | 571 m | 562 m | 357 m | 333 m | 560 m | 407 m | 384 m | 407 m | 298 m | 266 m | 216 m | 211 m |
| Geological History | sedimentary rocks, basalts, ammonites | | | volcanic rocks | | granitic rocks, sedimentary rocks, volcanic rocks | | | | basalts | basalts | granitic rocks |

| | Harris Peak | Mount Davidson | Fortress Ridge | Mount Solomon |
|---|---|---|---|---|
| Height | 2300 m | 2412 m | 2341 m | 2589 m |
| Prominence | 188 m | 180 m | 160 m | 157 m |
| Main Rock Type | | | | |

== Tourism ==
With approximately 170 km of trails, the park provides access to alpine meadows, valleys, ridge walks and mountain lakes. With around 22 trails with numerous destinations and viewing points, there are 10 major trails that have to be highlighted, this are: Gun Creek Trail, Gun Meadows Trail, Warner Pass Trail, Spruce Lake Trail, High Trail, Tyaughton Creek Trail, Deer Pass Trail, Open Heart Trail, WD Trail, and Relay Creek Trail. As a user-maintained park, the Ministry of Environment and the Commercial Operators encourages visitors to take care of their own trash since garbage removal service is not provided, as well as being aware that there are several private properties throughout the park it is encouraged that visitors are considerate and avoid breaking into them in addition to looking after potential harms like wildfires.

== South Chilcotin Mountains Provincial Park and Big Creek Park management plan ==
South Chilcotin Mountains have high ecological and recreational values. It protects the habitats needed for the abundant wildlife while providing recreational experiences is a high priority. Although this management plan involves two parks, they're close in proximity and hold similar traits in natural values, ecosystems and recreational uses.

The management plan highlights five things:

- Articulate key features and value;
- Identify appropriate types and levels of management activities;
- Determine appropriate levels of use and development;
- Establish the long-term vision and management objectives; and
- Respond to current and predicted threats and opportunities by creating a set of management strategies to achieve the management vision and objectives.

=== Co-management with Indigenous peoples ===
Indigenous peoples have used the area for hunting and gathering historically, and trails have been used as trading routes. Indigenous peoples have a deep desire to maintain wildlife populations, vegetation, and water quality. While working with BC parks to manage the parks and area, each Nation has their own plans in effect.

Nxekmenlhkalha Iti tmicwa land use plan is a separate management draft created by The St’at’imc Nation. The main goal was to have a continued and renewed relationship between the people (úcwalmicw) and the land (tmicw). To obtain this goal, it requires:

- Respecting cultural traditions using the laws and standards passed down through generations;
- Putting nature first – health of water, plants, animals and land is above all other things;
- Letting the St’át’imc people decide how the land and resources are used; and
- Recognizing the resources continue to give sustenance to the people.

The Tŝilhqot’in Nation also has a Stewardship Department that handles the natural resource concerns. These include forest resource activity and mining, oil and gas exploration and development.

For the Secwepemc, they have created a Fisheries Commission which asserts the traditional fisheries rights within a co-management framework. Along with this, holistic view for ecosystem conservation and management is considered. This aids towards strengthening Indigenous Peoples and their social and cultural heritage, while respecting all living beings and building relationships with neighbouring Nations.

Indigenous peoples have a strong connection to their land and territories. BC parks plans to continue to incorporate this traditional ecological knowledge in the future management planning.
