= List of edible plants and mushrooms of southeast Alaska =

Southeast Alaska has an unusual climate that allows a large number of edible plant and edible mushroom species to grow. The area consists primarily of the Tongass National Forest, which is a temperate rainforest. This rainforest has plenty of precipitation and the temperature remains relatively constant, therefore many plant and fungi species flourish there. On a geological time scale, fairly recently during the Little Ice Age, glaciers were abundant in southeast Alaska. The ice age's last maximum ended about 10,000 years ago. Once the glaciers retreated, they left behind nutrient-rich sediments. These nutrients in the soil enriched the ecosystem of the area.

== Tlingit use ==
Historically the Tlingit people of the Pacific Northwest foraged off of the land. The Tlingit cuisine included everything from whales to deer, and from clams to plants. Often the Tlingit people included in their diet many edible items from the surrounding native vegetation along with what ever seafood and wild game they were able to find. Hunting and fishing expeditions were not always successful, in which case, meals were made using the local berries, fungus, and seaweed. Because winters were long and cold in the Pacific Northwest, the Tlingit people used preserving methods in order to be able to use the gathered vegetation all winter long. Many of the edible plants that are consumed today in southeast Alaska are eaten because of the knowledge passed down from many generations of Tlingit.

== Berries ==
| Common name/Scientific Name | Tlingit Name | Image | Preparation | Comments |
|---|---|---|---|---|
| Lowbush cranberry, Lingonberry | Dáxw | | Eaten raw, also commonly used in jams and jellies. | In season late in the fall. Rich in antioxidants. |
| Thimbleberry, Rubus parviflorus | Ch'eex' | | Eaten raw, also commonly used in jams and jellies. Shoots can be eaten raw or cooked | Very similar to the common raspberry. |
| Strawberry | Saákw | | Eaten raw, also commonly used in jams and jellies. | Fruits late in spring. Leaves can be mashed to make tea. |
| Salmonberry, Rubus spectabilis | Was'x'aan Tléigu | | Eaten raw, also commonly used in jams and jellies. Shoots can be peeled and eaten raw. | Available in July/August. Common on hillsides with much rain and sun. |
| Nagoonberry, Rubus arcticus | Neigóon | | Eaten raw, also commonly used to make juice and tea. | Found in damp, low, meadows. Berries are very fragile. Not normally found in abundance. |
| Bunchberry, Cornus canadensis | K'eikaxétl'k | | Can be eaten fresh, also can be preserved by freezing. | High in pectin. Berries ripen later at higher elevations. |
| Huckleberry | Tleikatánk | | Eaten raw, also commonly used in jams and jellies. | Grows on sunny hillsides. Worms frequently present among berries. |
| Highbush cranberry, Viburnum trilobum | Kaxwéix | | Tart when eaten raw. | Fruits in late summer. Found in woods and rocky banks. Pectin content higher earlier in the summer. |
| Gooseberry, Ribes uva-crispa | Shaax | | Can be eaten raw. | Available mid-August. Berry has a distinct odor. |
| Elderberry, Sambucus | Yéil' | | Flowers and mature deseeded fruit can be eaten raw. | Berries are sometimes found up to 20 feet high. Cooking the berries removes an alkaloid that may upset the stomach. Said to have the ability to calm nerves. Consumption of seeds, immature berries, stems, and roots, may cause cyanide poisoning. |
| Cloudberry, Rubus chamaemorus | Néx'w | | Eaten raw, also commonly used in jams and jellies. | Fruits in late fall. Leaves can be used to make a medicinal tea. |
| Twisted Stalk, Wild Cucumber, Watermelon Berry, Streptopus amplexifolius | Tleikw Kahínti | | Berries and young stems can be eaten fresh or raw. | Berries have a delicate flavor resembling watermelon. Stems taste similar to cucumber. Grows in shady, moist areas. The poisonous False hellebore plant sometimes grows close to the Watermellon berry, and has similar leaves. |
| Alaskan Blueberry | Kanat'a | | Eaten fresh and commonly used in jams, jellies, and baked goods. | Fruits in mid-July to late August. Grows on wet, sunny hillsides. |

== Fungi ==
The temperate rainforest of the Tongass National Forest often produces a great amount of mushrooms in the summer and fall months. Fungi can be used for dyeing natural fibers and as a food source. In the ecosystem, Fungi cycle nutrients, aggregate soil, retain water, and are a source of food for many animals. There are many kinds of fungi, including Chanterelles, Boletes, Morels, and Puffballs.

=== Limits on harvesting ===
Generally speaking individuals are permitted to harvest mushrooms in the Tongass National Forest without a special license. However, it is expected that harvesters help protect the natural resources from damage. For commercial harvest, a permit is required. Harvesters must check with a local forest ranger to make sure all harvesting is legal.

Many species of mushrooms and berries can be poisonous, but look similar to the edible species. Harvesting the entire mushroom allows for easier identification as does taking note of the surroundings where the fungus was found. All harvested mushrooms need to be cooked, not eaten raw.

| Common name/Scientific Name | Image | Comments |
|---|---|---|
| Shrimp russula, Russula xerampelina | | Fishy odor when mature. Most commonly eaten russula. |
| Orange milk-cap, Lactarius deliciosus group | | Once handled, the fungus will turn green. Gathered for food, but Alaskan populations not considered deserving of the name deliciosus. |
| The gypsy, Cortinarius caperatus | | The gypsy is hard to identify and therefore can be confused with more dangerous species. |
| Alaskan gold, Phaeolepiota aurea | | Easy to identify. Typically found in disturbed areas and in large areas. |
| Pacific gold chanterelle, Cantharellus formosus | | Large and found in small numbers. Has an odor similar to apricots. |
| Yellow foot, Craterellus tubaeformis | | Small, slender, and trumpet shaped. Long fruiting season. |
| Black chanterelle, Polyozellus multiplex | | Very distinct and striking. Typically in tight clusters and under spruce. Rare. |
| King bolete, Boletus edulis | | Very popular edible mushroom. The tubes can also be used as a dye. |
| Admirable bolete, Boletus mirabilis | | Typically fruits on wood. Is said to have a lemony taste. |
| Chicken of the woods, Laetiporus sulphureus | | Large cluster with shelves exceeding 12 inches in width. Young, fresh, fruitbodies are the most desirable to eat. |
| Bear's head, Hericium abietis | | Very distinctive fungus. Typically grows on conifer logs and stumps. |
| Gray fire morel, Morchella tomentosa | | Very dark colored when young, but lightens with age. Considered one of the most desirable edible fungi in the area. |
| Early false morel, Verpa bohemica | | One of the first mushrooms to emerge in the late spring or early summer. In some people, the early false morel is known to cause gastric upset. |
