= Arberry =

Arberry may refer to:

- Arberry (shrub), three species of dwarf shrubs
- Arthur John Arberry (1905–1969), British scholar of Islam
