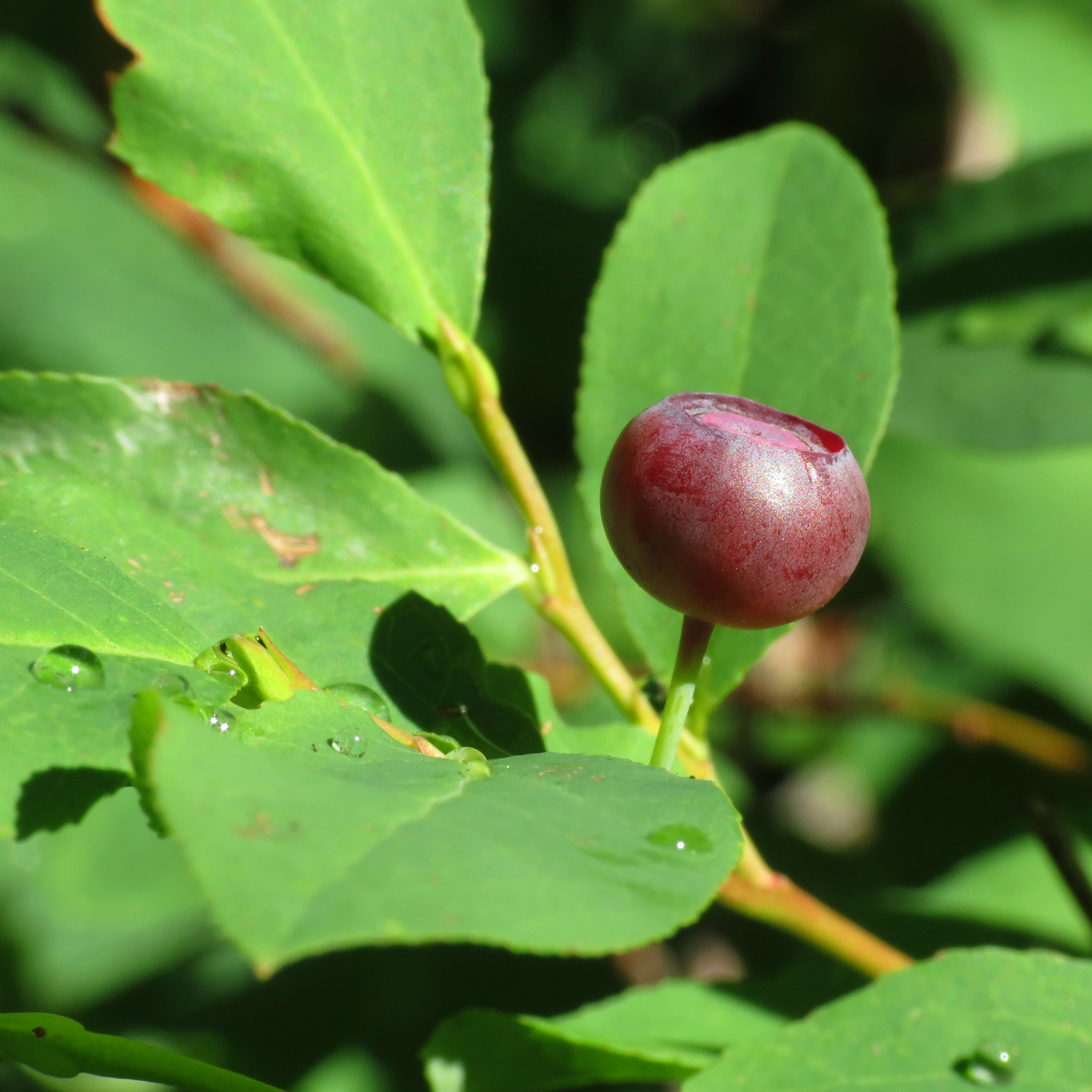

Conservation status
- Secure (NatureServe)

Scientific classification
- Kingdom: Plantae
- Clade: Embryophytes
- Clade: Tracheophytes
- Clade: Angiosperms
- Clade: Eudicots
- Clade: Asterids
- Order: Ericales
- Family: Ericaceae
- Genus: Vaccinium
- Species: V. membranaceum

Binomial name
- Vaccinium membranaceum Douglas ex Torr. 1874

Synonyms
- Vaccinium globulare Rydberg; Vaccinium membranaceum var. rigidum (Hooker) Fernald

= Vaccinium membranaceum =

Species of plant

Vaccinium membranaceum is a species of flowering plant in the heath family Ericaceae, known by the common names thinleaf huckleberry, tall huckleberry, big huckleberry, mountain huckleberry, square-twig blueberry, and "black huckleberry".

== Description ==
Vaccinium membranaceum is an erect shrub growing up to 1.5 metres (5 feet) tall. The new twigs are yellow-green and somewhat angled. The deciduous leaves are alternately arranged. The leaf blades are oval, very thin to membranous, and up to 5 centimetres (2 in) long. The edges are serrated, with each tiny tooth tipped by a glandular hair.

Solitary flowers occur in the leaf axils. Each is around 6 millimetres (1/4 in) long, urn-shaped to cylindrical, and pale pink to waxy bronze in color. The species has a tetraploid set of genes and a total of 48 chromosomes.

The mature fruit ranges from red through bluish-purple to a dark, almost black berry about 1 cm wide. Each fruit contains an average of 47 tiny seeds.

Reproduction

The plant usually spreads by cloning itself from its rhizome or shoots. The seeds sometimes germinate if dispersed by animals, as evidenced by populations of the plant growing on the recovering section of Mount St. Helens. Other than the study by Yang et al. (2008), reports of V. membranaceum sprouting from seed are quite rare with other scientists who have studied this species reporting only 6 seedlings observed over 18 years in the field.

== Distribution and habitat ==
Vaccinium membranaceum is native to western North America, with a range extending in the northern from southern Alaska, Yukon, and Northwest Territories south as far as Utah and the northern mountains of California. It can be found from the mountains next to the Pacific Ocean in the west, to the Rocky Mountains and Black Hills in the east.

Isolated populations of this species have been found in Arizona, North Dakota, Minnesota, the Upper Peninsula of Michigan, and Ontario.

The species grows at higher elevations in subalpine and alpine environments. It occurs in both pine and spruce dominated forests and in open meadow ecosystems. In forests, V. membranaceum often dominates the forest understory during early to mid stages of succession. The species is fire adapted. The leaves and stems of the huckleberry are resistant to low-intensity fires, and if burned away they will resprout vigorously from rhizomes buried under the soil.

== Ecology ==
The flowers are pollinated by bees.

The plant provides a key food source for black and grizzly bears, which eat the leaves, stems, roots, and fruit. Elk, moose, and white-tailed deer also browse the plant. The thickets provide cover for many species of small animals.

== Uses ==
The berry is edible. Vaccinium membranaceum is the most commonly collected of all of the wild western huckleberries and it has great commercial importance. In a good year, V. membranaceum shrubs provide a lot of fruit from late summer to early fall.

=== By Native Americans ===
People have been eating the fruit of this species for thousands of years. It was and continues to be widely used for food by Native Americans. The Kutenai called the plant shawíash (Ktunaxa: ǂawiyaǂ). Alaska Natives consumed it in bread and pies as a source of vitamin C, the Coeur d'Alene people ate the fruit fresh, dried, mashed, cooked, and added it to soup or froze it for later use, and many other groups relished it and stored it frozen, dried, pressed into cakes, or canned for winter use.

Some Native American groups lit carefully planned controlled burns in wild huckleberry patches to promote fruit production by eliminating competing plants and by stimulating the huckleberry to sprout and spread. Native American groups throughout the Pacific Northwest still utilize this plant as an important cultural food and are active in its management.

== In culture ==
The amount of fruit produced by these shrubs is legendary, with stories being told of mountain sides turned purple by all of the fruit, or shrubs being weighed to the ground by large, and abundant berries.

The huckleberry is the official state fruit of Idaho, with this particular species assumed to be the huckleberry in question.
