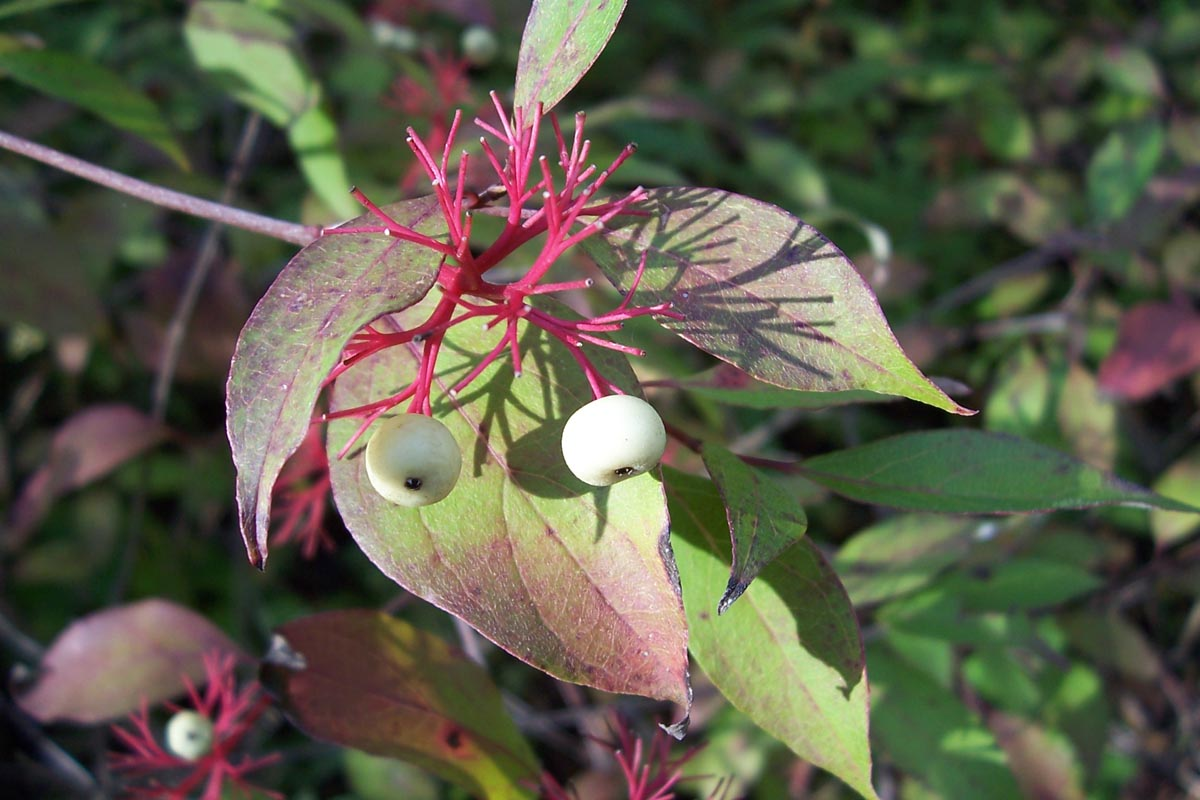
- Red osier dogwood bearing fruit

Conservation status
- Least Concern (IUCN 3.1)

- Secure (NatureServe)

Scientific classification
- Kingdom: Plantae
- Clade: Tracheophytes
- Clade: Angiosperms
- Clade: Eudicots
- Clade: Asterids
- Order: Cornales
- Family: Cornaceae
- Genus: Cornus
- Subgenus: Cornus subg. Kraniopsis
- Species: C. sericea

Binomial name
- Cornus sericea L.
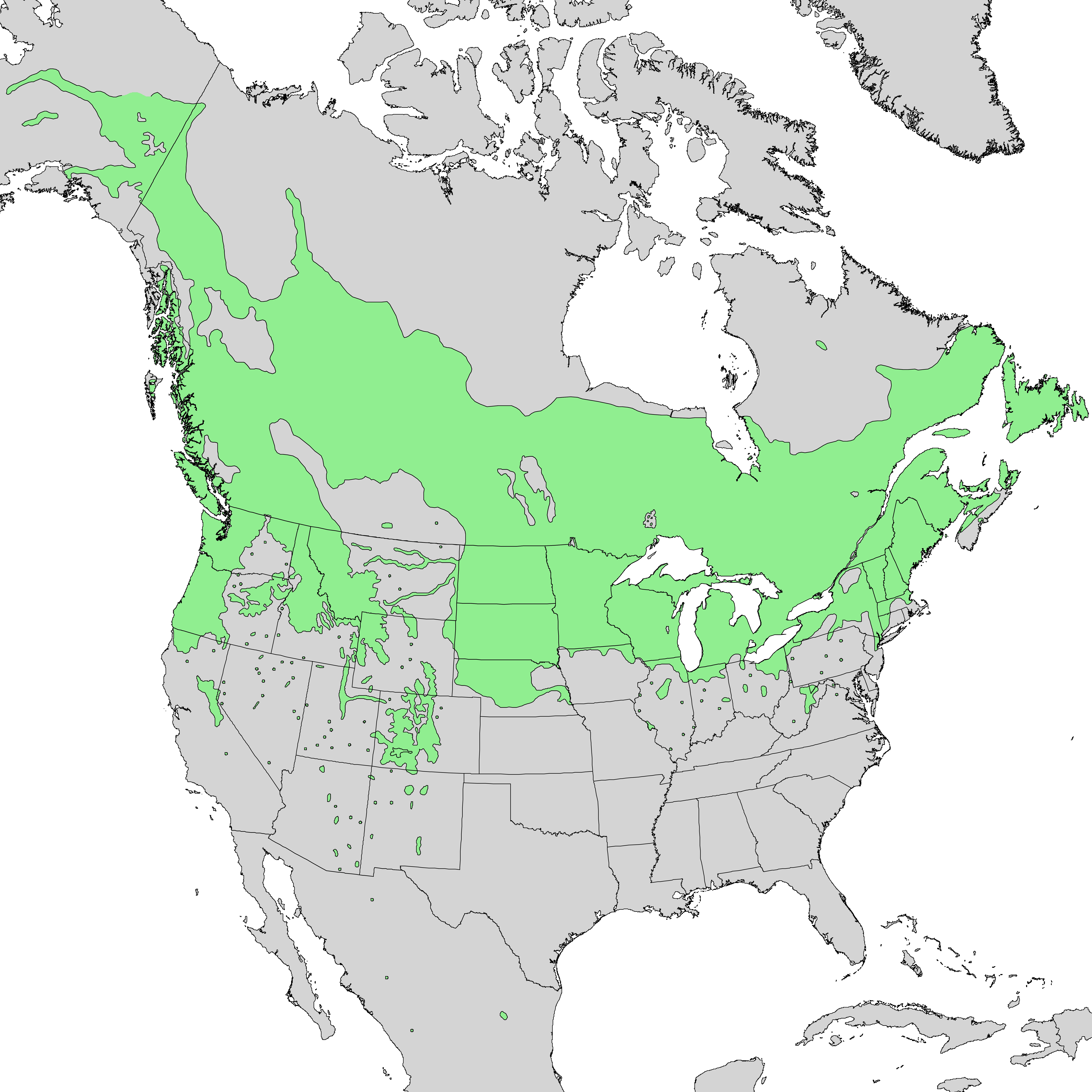
- Natural range of subsp. sericea
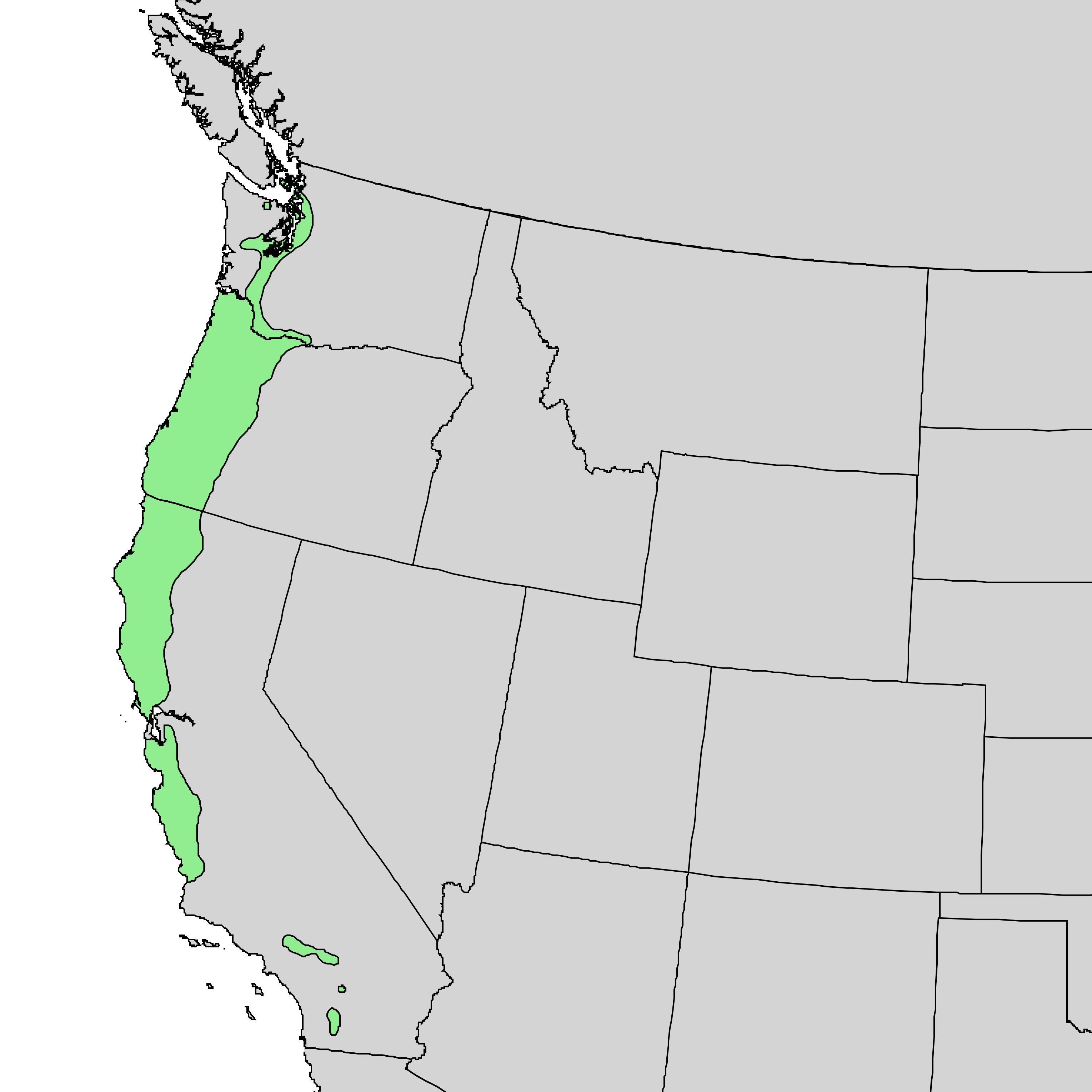
- Natural range of subsp. occidentalis

Synonyms
- C. stolonifera, Swida sericea

= Cornus sericea =

Species of flowering plant

Cornus sericea, the red osier or red-osier dogwood, is a species of flowering plant in the family Cornaceae, native to much of North America. It has sometimes been considered a synonym of the Asian species Cornus alba. Other names include red brush, red willow, redstem dogwood, redtwig dogwood, red-rood, American dogwood, creek dogwood, and western dogwood.

== Description ==
It is a medium to tall deciduous shrub, growing 1.5–4 metres (4.9–13.1 feet) tall and 3–5 m (9.8–16.4 ft) wide, spreading readily by underground stolons to form dense thickets. The branches and twigs are dark red, although wild plants may lack this coloration in shaded areas.

The leaves are opposite, 5–12 centimetres (2.0–4.7 inches) long and 2.5–6 cm (0.98–2.36 in) broad, with an ovate to oblong shape and an entire margin; they are dark green above and glaucous below; fall color is commonly bright red to purple. Like all dogwoods, they have characteristic stringy white piths within the leaf stalks, which can be used for identification.

The flowers are 5–10 millimetres (0.20–0.39 in) wide, flat, umbel-like and dull white, in clusters 3–6 centimetres (1.2–2.4 in) across.

The fruit is a globose white berry 5–9 mm (0.20–0.35 in) in diameter. It is bitter and unpalatable.

== Taxonomy ==
=== Subspecies ===
It is a variable species, with two subspecies commonly accepted:

- Cornus sericea subsp. sericea – throughout the range of the species. Shoots and leaves hairless or finely pubescent; flower petals 2–3 mm.
- Cornus sericea subsp. occidentalis (Torr. & A.Gray) Fosberg – western North America. Shoots and leaves densely pubescent; flower petals 3–4.5 mm. Considered by some authorities to be full species, Cornus torreyi.

=== Etymology ===
The Latin specific epithet sericea means "silky", referring to the texture of the leaves.

== Distribution and habitat ==
It is native throughout boreal and temperate zones in northern and western North America from Alaska east to Newfoundland, south to Durango and Nuevo León in the west, and Illinois and Virginia in the east.

Cornus sericea L. has been recorded from counties Antrim and Londonderry in Northern Ireland.

In the wild, the species most commonly grows in areas of rich, poorly drained soils, such as riparian zones and wetlands, or in upland areas which receive more than 510 mm (20 in) of annual precipitation. More uncommonly, it may be found in drier zones albeit at lesser abundance. Red osier dogwood is tolerant of flooding and has been known to survive up to seven years of water above root crown level. It occurs from sea level to 3,000 m (10,000 ft), but in many areas is most common above 460 m (1,500 ft).

== Ecology ==
Red osier dogwood provides food and cover for many species of mammals and birds. The stems and especially new shoots are browsed by moose, elk, bighorn sheep, mountain goats, beavers, and rabbits, while the fruits are an important autumn food source for bears, small mammals, and 47 different bird species. In winter, red osier dogwood is heavily browsed by ungulates; in some areas use exceeds availability and individuals which have not been browsed are rare. The shrub is also important for nesting habitat and cover for a great variety of animals.

Cornus sericea is shade tolerant but prefers intermediate to high light levels. It tolerates disturbance well, and appears early in both primary and secondary succession throughout its native range, but especially in floodplains and riparian zones. It thrives in fire-disturbed sites, sprouting from seeds or damaged shrubs.

Although its conservation status is overall secure, it is considered vulnerable in Iowa and critically imperiled in Kentucky and Virginia.

== Cultivation ==
Cornus sericea is a popular ornamental shrub that is often planted for the red coloring of its twigs in the dormant season. The cultivars 'Bud's Yellow', 'Flaviramea' with lime green stems, and 'Hedgerows Gold' (variegated foliage) have gained the Royal Horticultural Society's Award of Garden Merit (confirmed in 2017).

Like most dogwood species native to North America, C. sericea can be parasitized by the dogwood sawfly, possibly leaving much of the plant devoid of leaves. A variety of pesticides are effective; however, hand-picking the larvae is also an option.

== Uses ==
Cornus sericea is frequently used for waterway bank erosion protection and restoration in the United States and Canada. Its root system provides excellent soil retention, it is hardy and provides an attractive shrub even when bare in winter, and its ability to be reproduced by cuttings makes it a low-cost solution for large-scale plantings.

Some Plateau Indigenous tribes ate the berries to treat colds and to slow bleeding.

Known as čhaŋšáša in Lakota, the inner bark was also used by the Lakota and other Native Americans as "traditional tobacco", either by itself or in a mixture with other plant materials. Among the Algonquian peoples such as the Ojibwe, the smoking mixtures, known as kinnikinnick, blended the inner bark with tobacco, while more western tribes added it to the bearberry leaf to improve the taste.

The Ojibwe used red-osier dogwood bark as a dye by taking the inner bark and mixing it with other bloodroot and wild plum to make yellow dye. There are several red dye formulas such as white birch, red osier dogwood, outer and inner bark, oak, Ashes from cedar bark and hot water. Red osier dogwood, alder and hot water used to dye blankets makes a light red dye which isn't very color fast. Bloodroot, wild plum, red osier dogwood, alder were used to dye porcupine quills red. In addition, it was used to make a black dye using alder, red osier dogwood, oak, grindstone dust or black earth, hot water.

The withies, or osiers, are used in basketry.

== Gallery ==
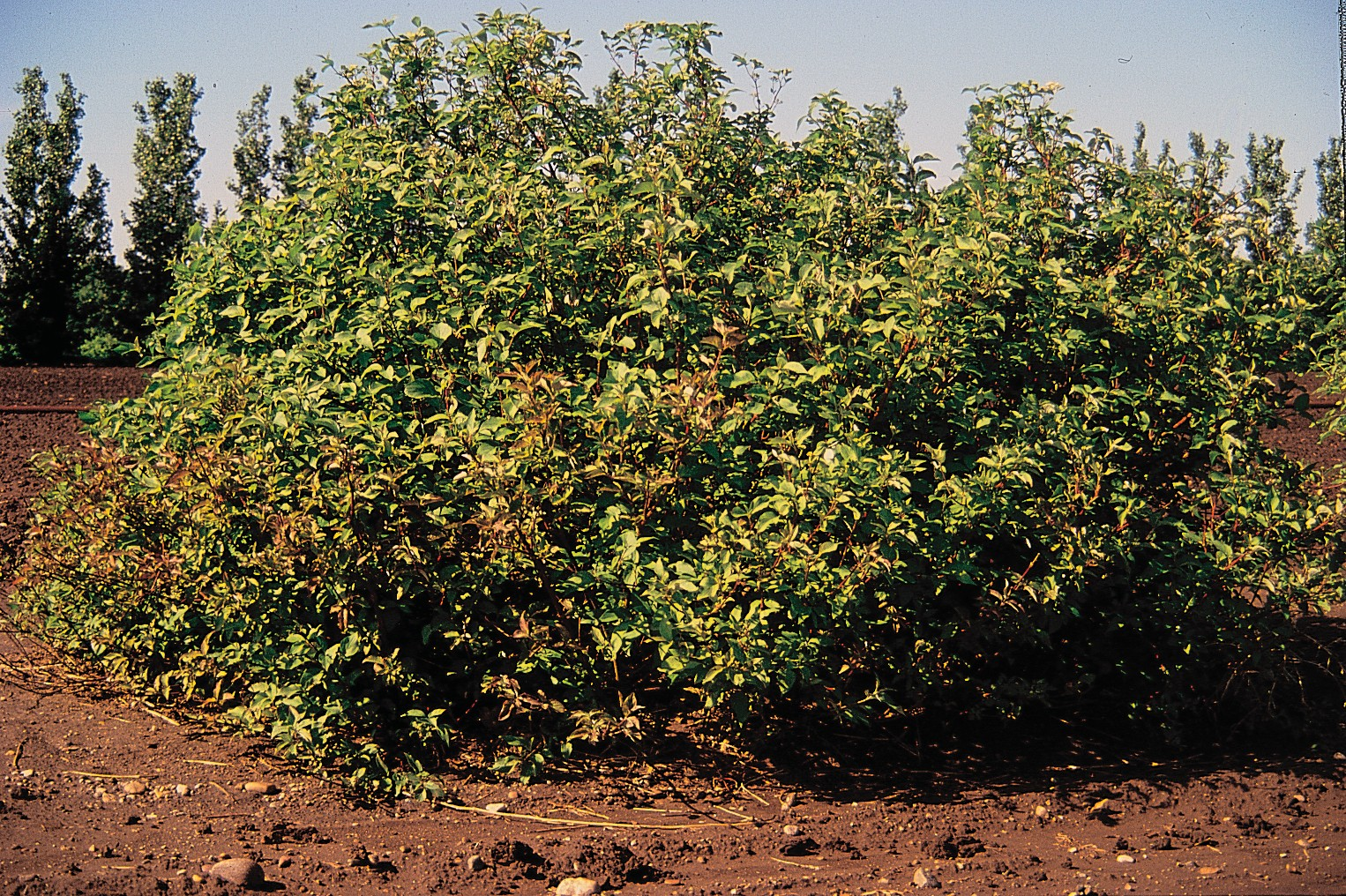
shrub

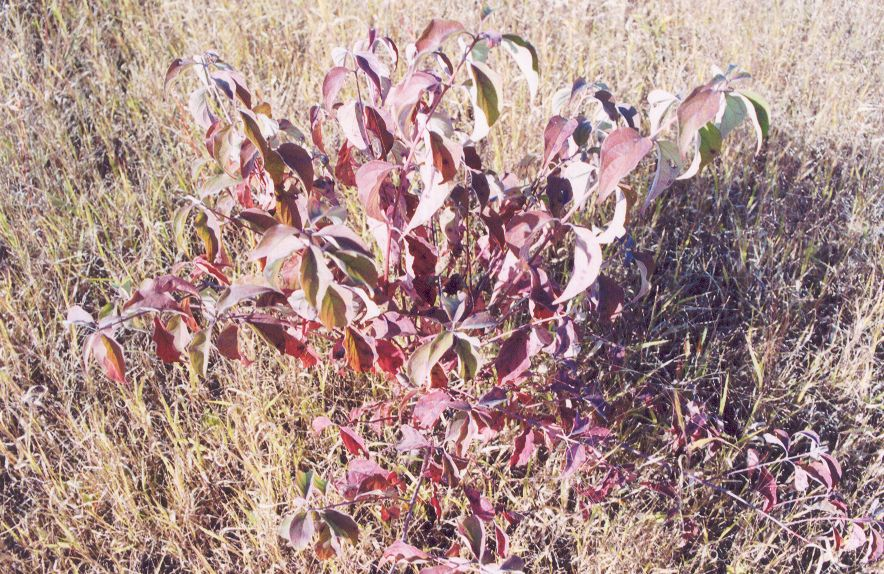
shrub, fall

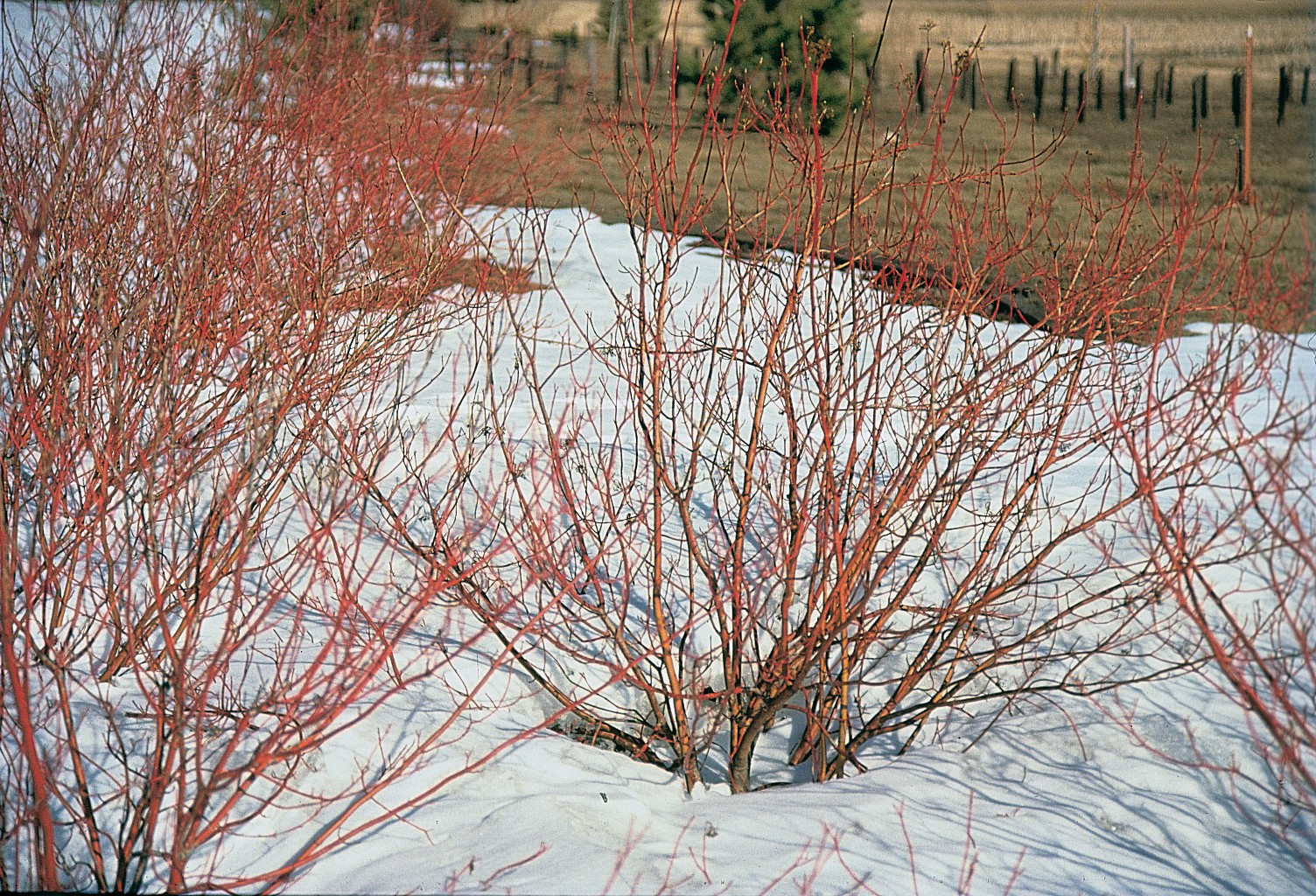
shrub, winter

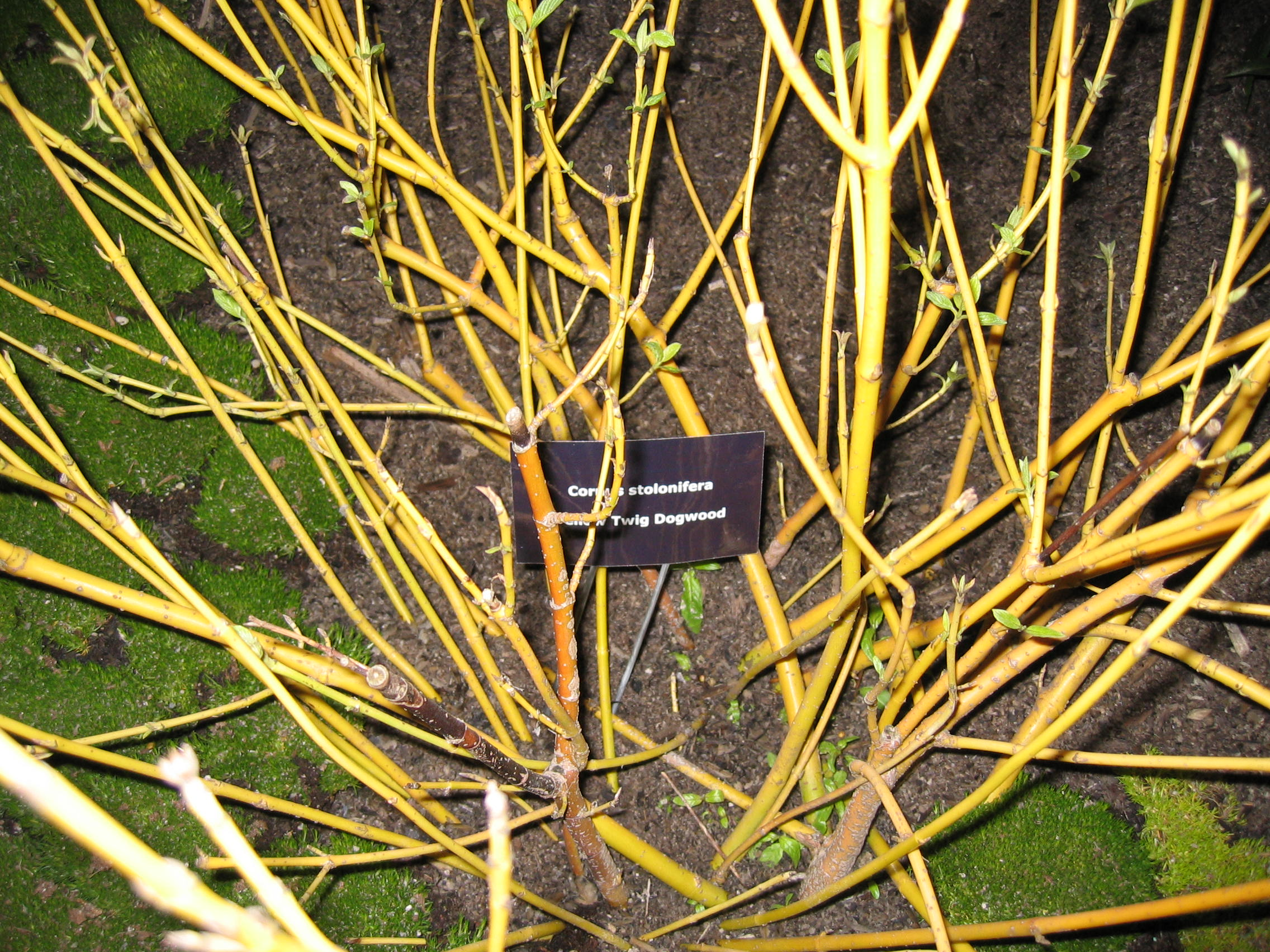
twigs

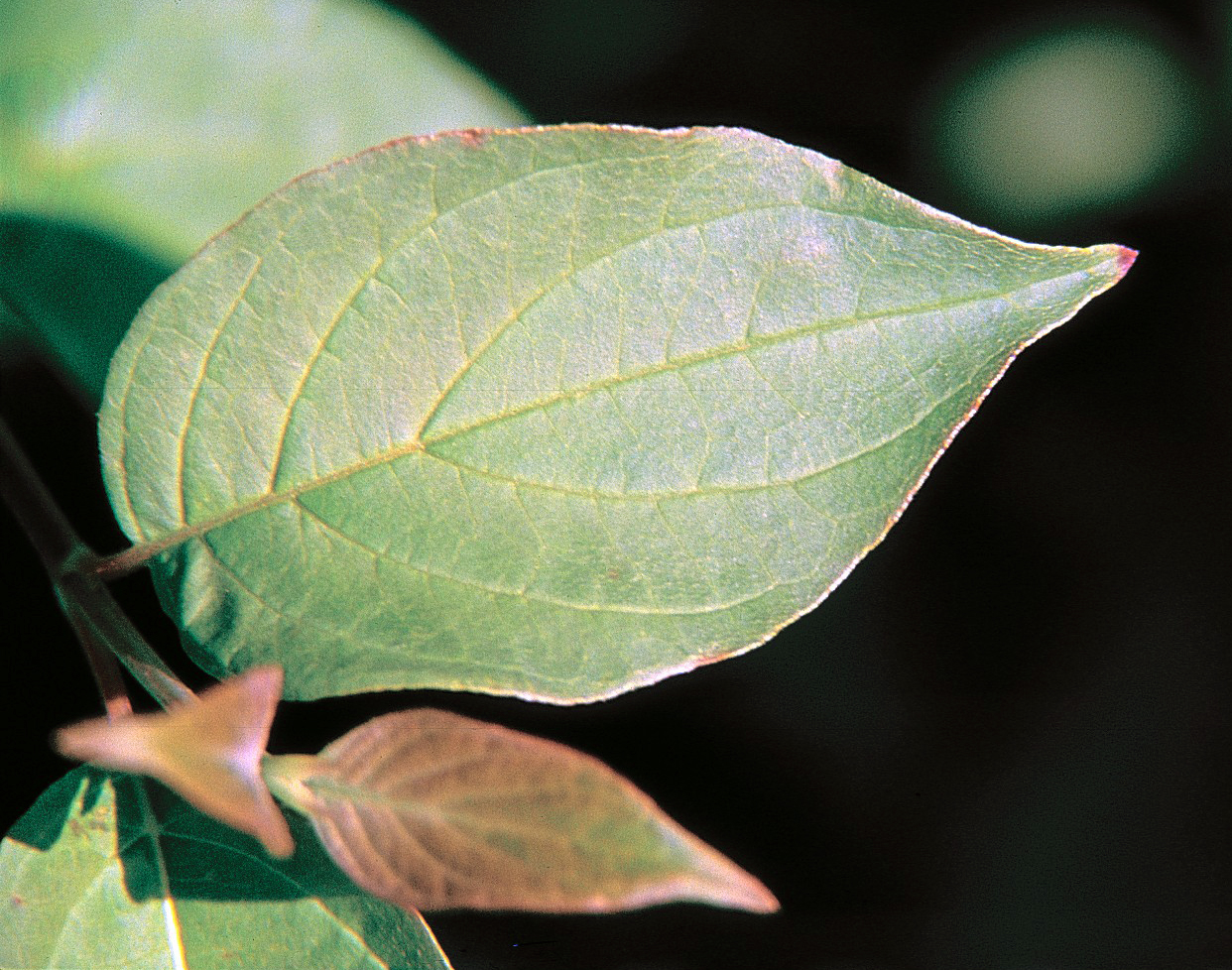
leaf

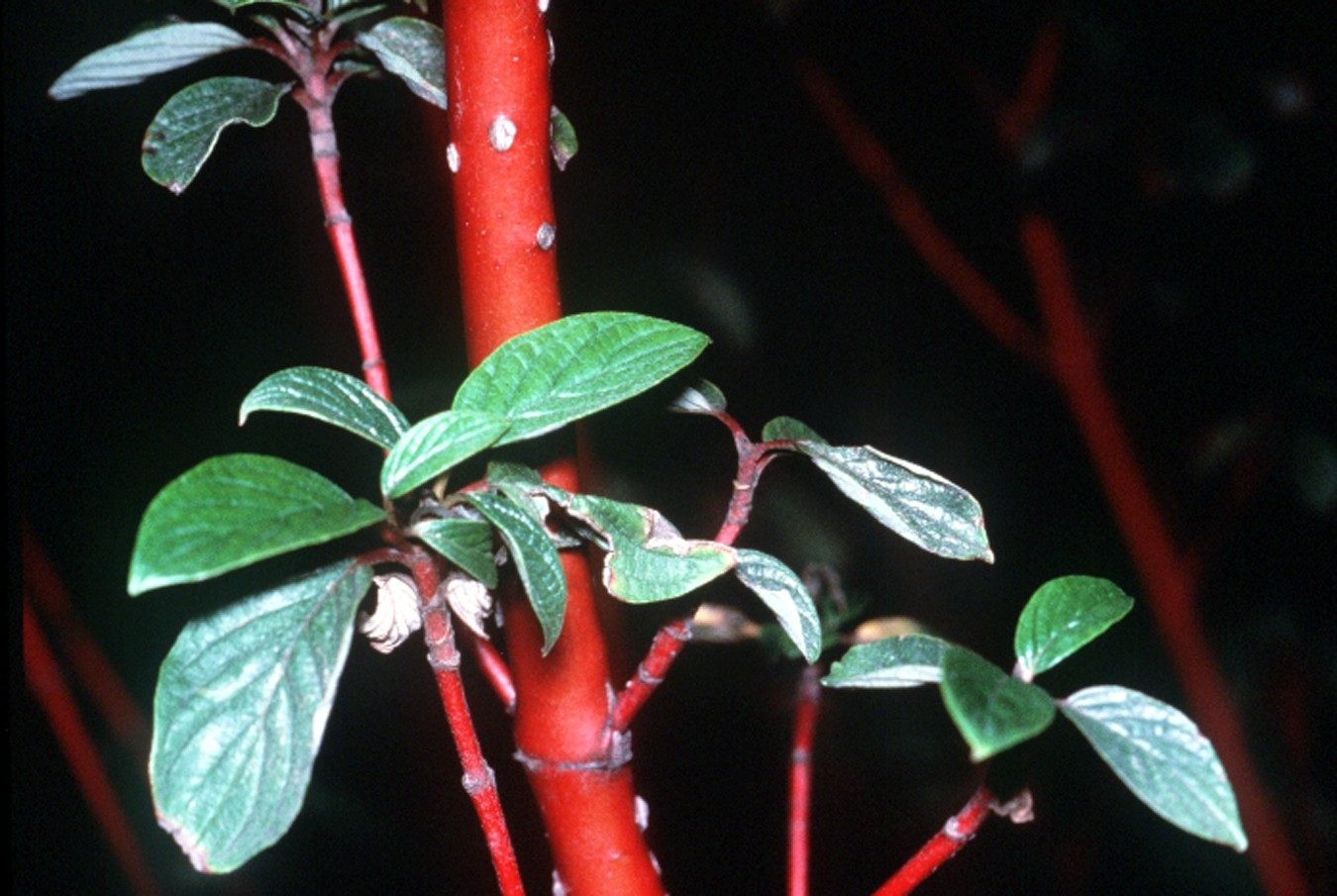
twig and leaf

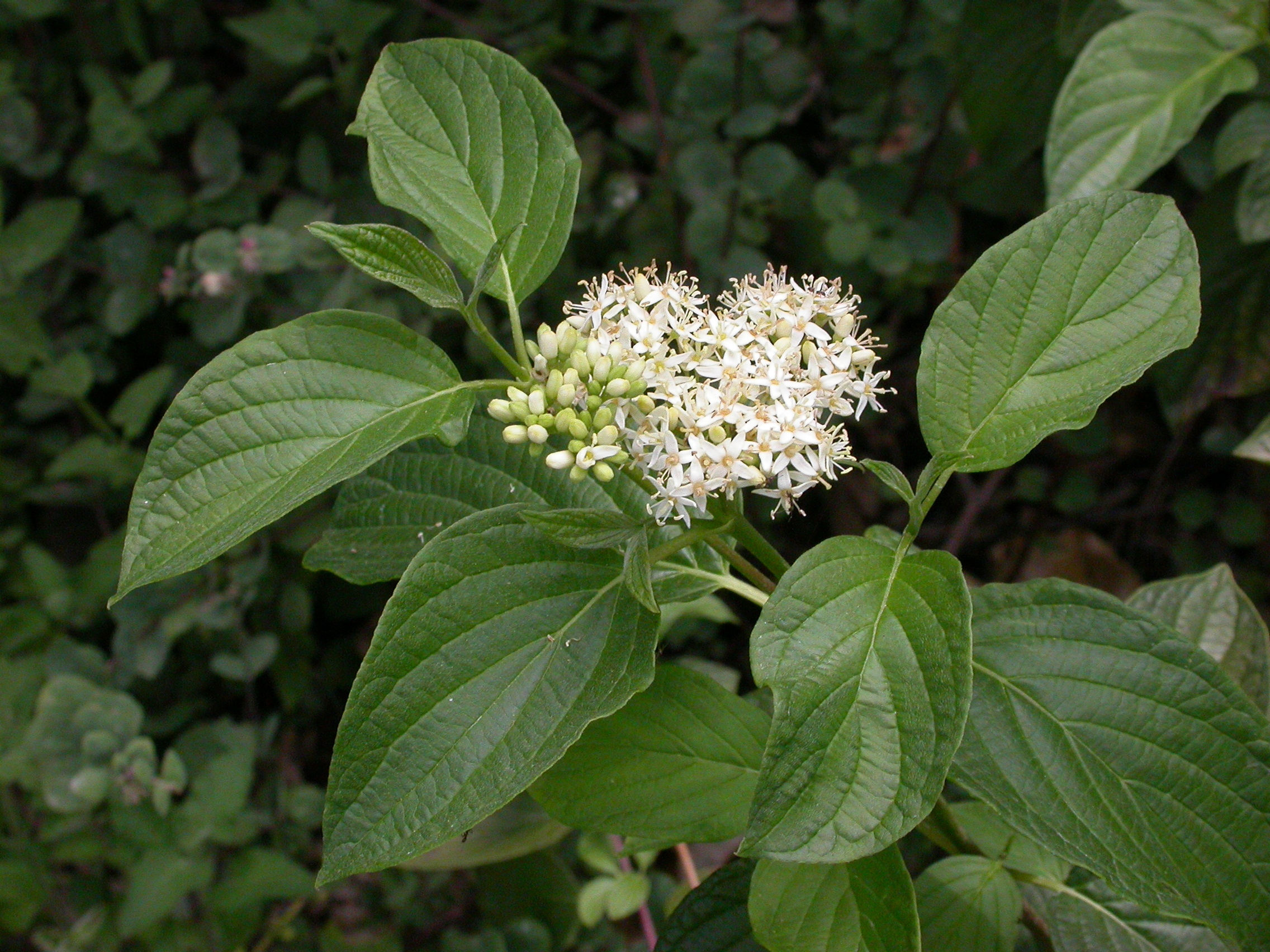
flowers

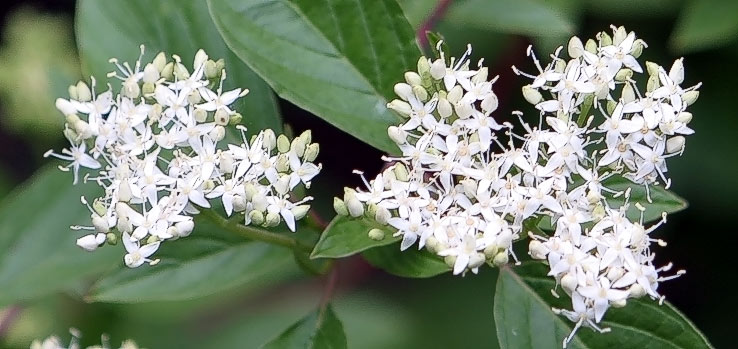
flowers

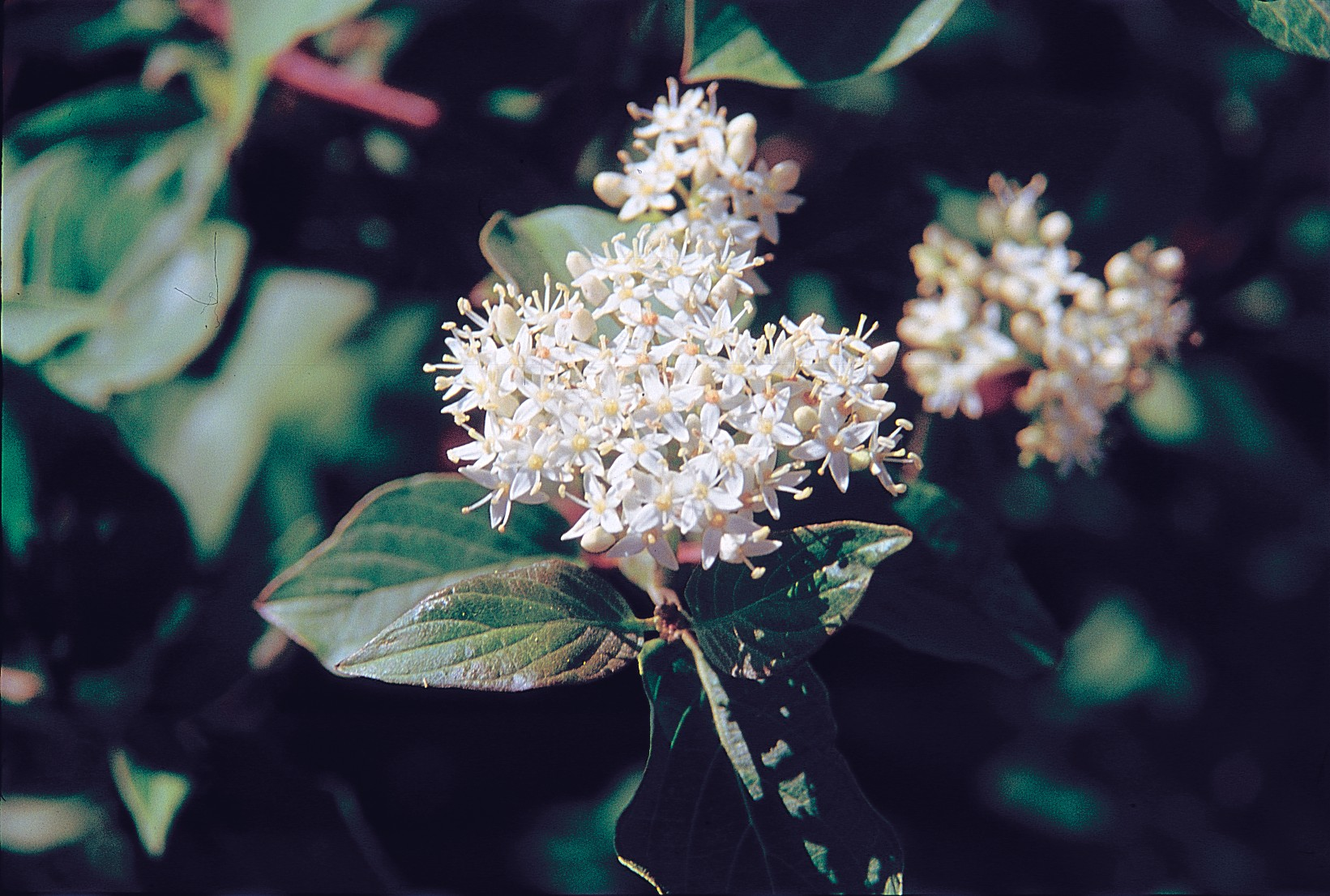
flowers

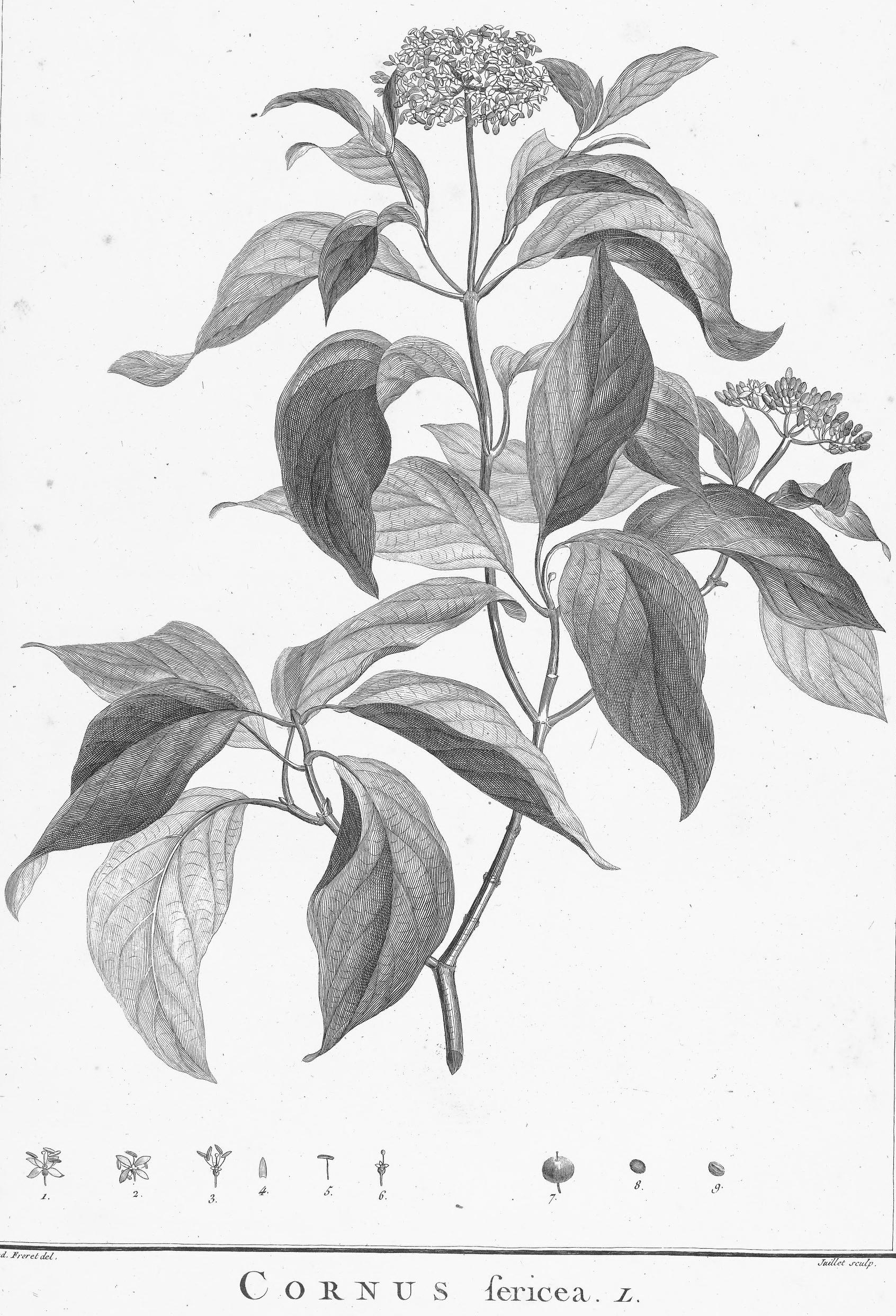
Botanical illustration

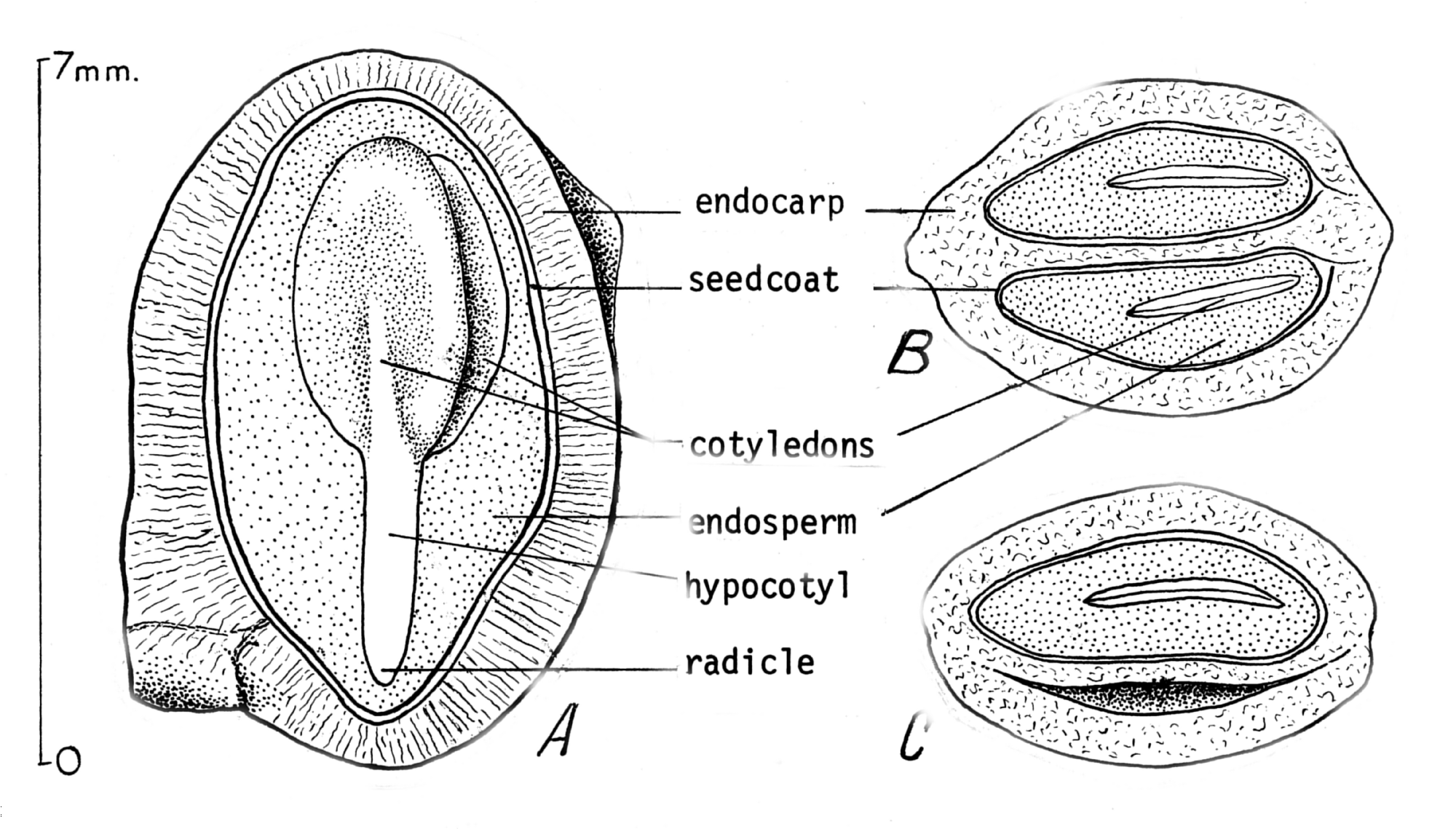
seed
