= Lowbush berry =

Lowbush berry may refer to:

- Lowbush blueberry, a common name for several perennial flowering plants with blue or purple berries
  - Wild lowbush blueberry, Vaccinium angustifolium
- Lowbush cranberry, a common name for several flowering plants
