= Bearberry =

Common name for several plant species

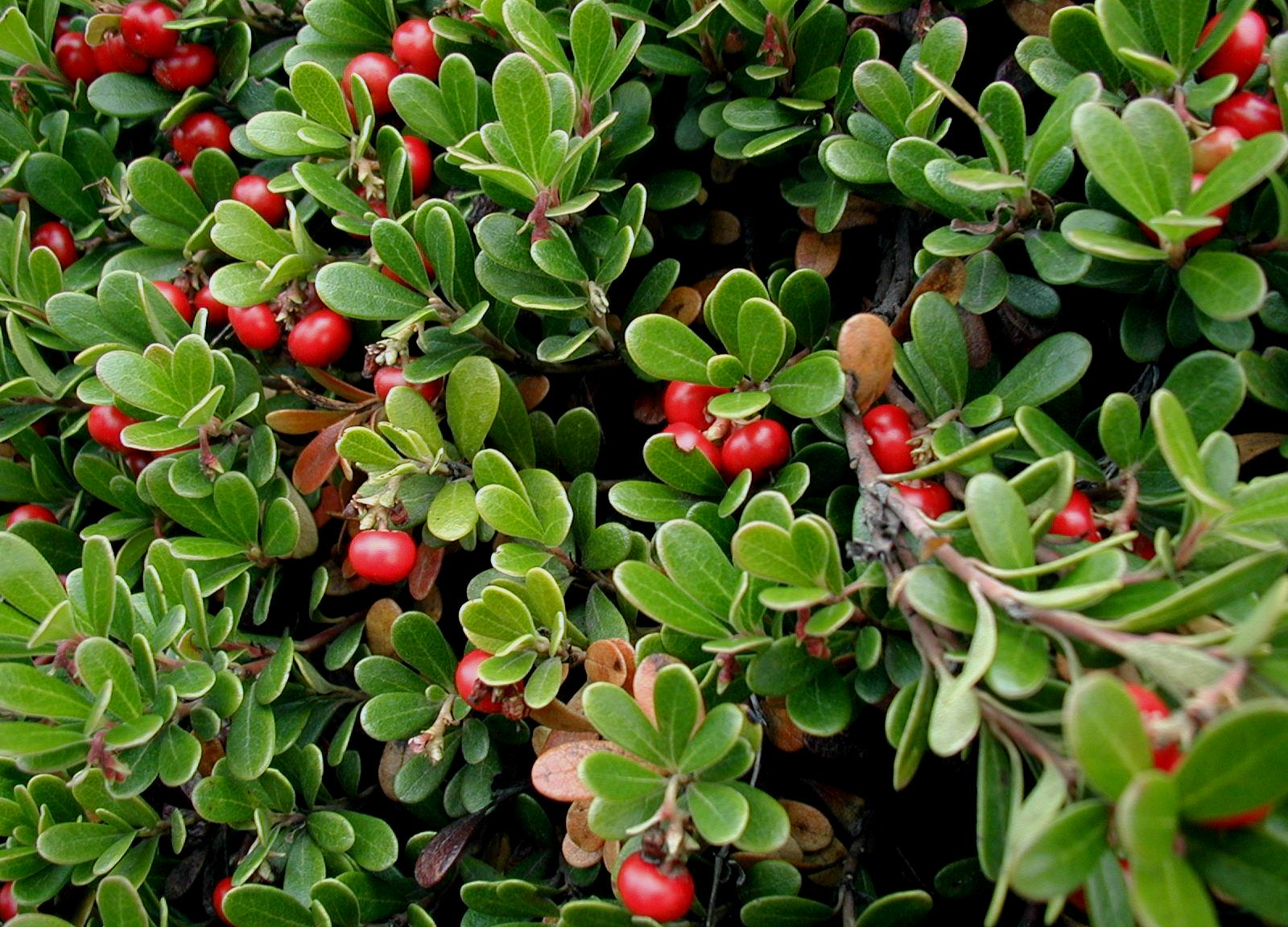
Arctostaphylos uva-ursi

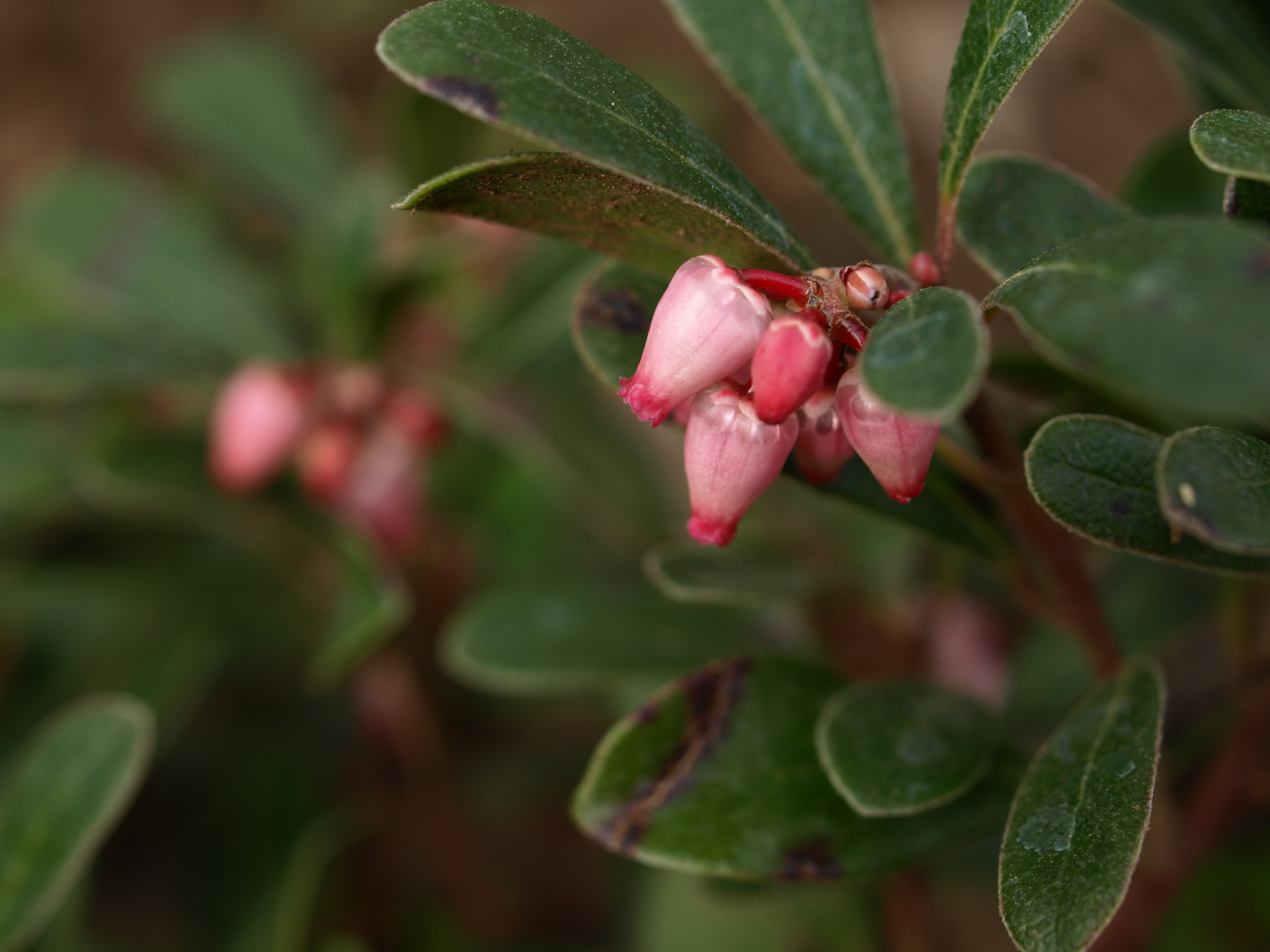
Arctostaphylos uva-ursi flowers

Bearberries are dwarf shrubs in the genus Arctostaphylos, especially the species A. uva-ursi, A. alpina, and A. rubra. Unlike most other species of Arctostaphylos (see manzanita), they are adapted to Arctic, subarctic, and alpine/subalpine climates and have a circumpolar distribution in northern North America, Asia and Europe.

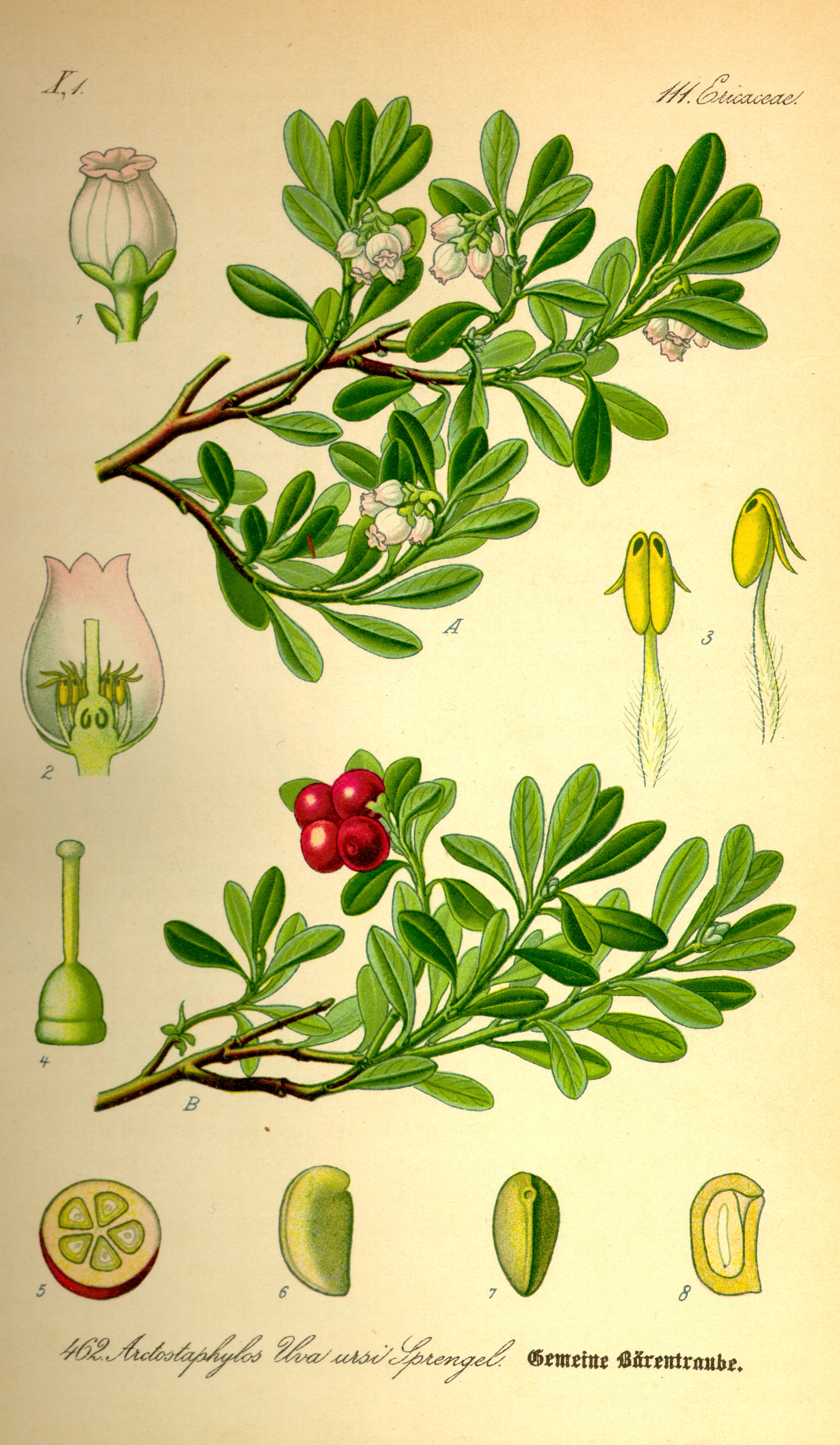
Common bearberry from Thomé Flora von Deutschland, Österreich und der Schweiz 1885

== Etymology ==
The genus name, Arctostaphylos, derives from the Greek arctos ("bear") and staphylos ("bunch of grapes"). The species epithet uva-ursi has a similar etymology, but from Latin: uva ("bunch of grapes") and ursus ("bear").

In the culture of First Nations people of Canada, the plant is called kinnikinnick, from an Algonquian (possibly a Blackfoot) word for (smoking) "mixture".

== Description ==
Bearberries grow as low-lying shrubs in soils predominantly composed of sand, gravel, or dunes in the boreal forest. It is less common north of the tree line.

The plant has flexible branches growing up to 2 metres (6 ft 7 in) long covered with red, shredded bark and dark green, oval leaves. Flowers are white or pink, tipped with red, growing in small clusters at the ends of branches, and later maturing into red oval fruits.

== Species ==
The name "bearberry" for the plant derives in part from the edible fruit which is a food for bears. The fruits are gathered as food for humans, and the leaves are used in indigenous herbal medicine.

The alpine bearberry Arctostaphylos alpina (L.) Spreng (syn. Arctous alpinus (L.) Niedenzu) is a procumbent shrub 10–30 cm high (3.9–11.8 in). Berries are dark purple to black. Its distribution is in northern latitudes from Scotland east across Scandinavia, Russia, Alaska, Canada and Greenland; southern limits extend into Europe in the Pyrenees and the Alps, in Asia to the Altay Mountains, and in North America to British Columbia in the west, and Maine and New Hampshire in the United States in the east.

The red bearberry Arctostaphylos rubra (Rehd. & Wilson) Fernald (syn. Arctous rubra (Rehder and E.H. Wilson) Nakai; Arctous alpinus var. ruber Rehd. and Wilson) is a procumbent shrub 10–30 cm high (3.9–11.8 in) with deciduous leaves. Berries are red. Its distribution is in the mountains of Sichuan, southwestern China north and east to eastern Siberia, Alaska and northern Canada, east to northern Quebec.

== Uses ==
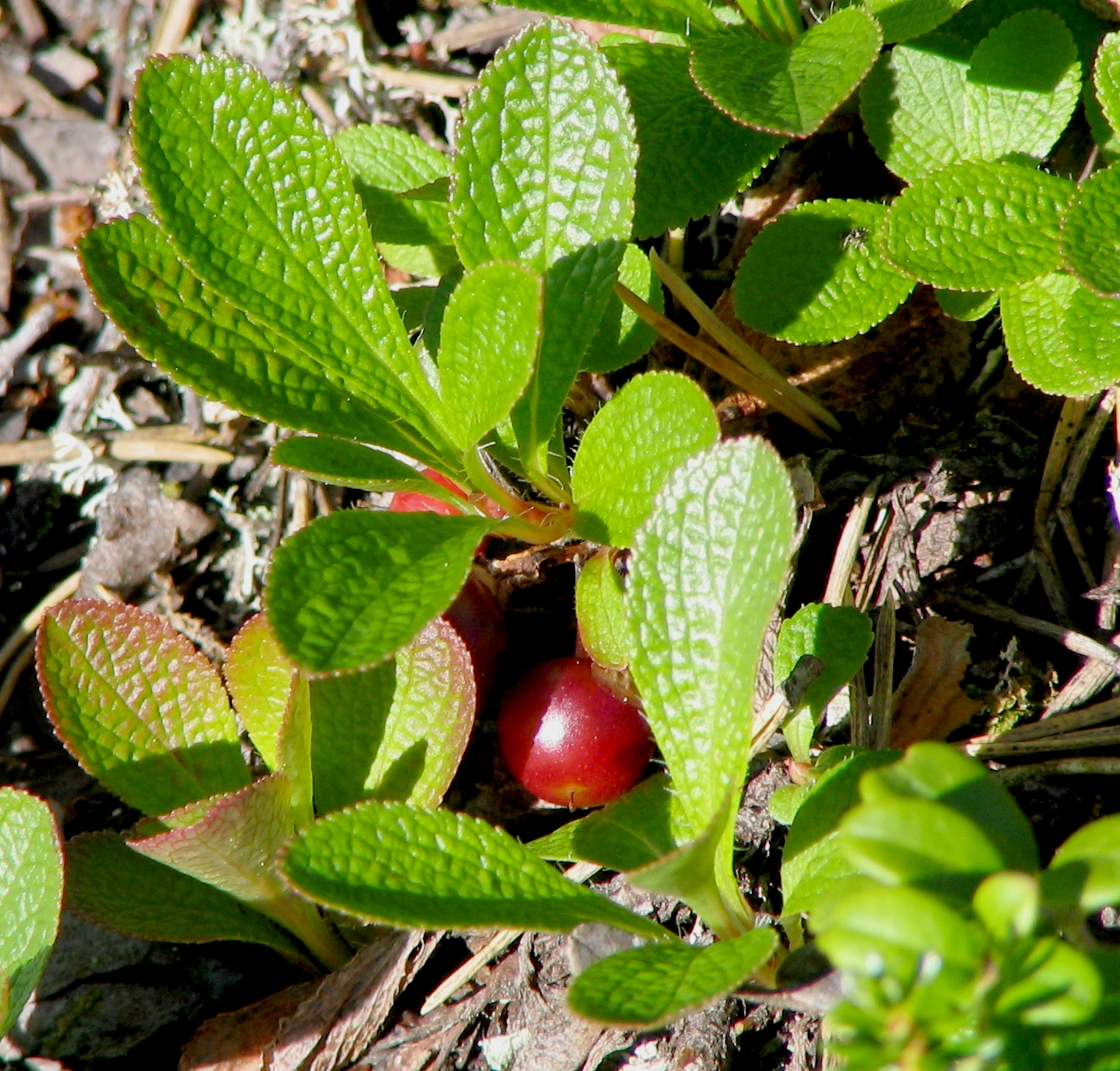
Arctostaphylos rubra

The berries ripen late in summer and can be eaten raw.

The plant contains diverse phytochemicals, including ursolic acid, tannic acid, gallic acid, some essential oils and resin, hydroquinones (mainly arbutin, up to 17%), tannins (up to 15%), phenolic glycosides and flavonoids.

Native American Indians traditionally made use of the plant's leaves, which they gathered in summer and dried for use as a tobacco substitute or mixed with tobacco.

=== Folk medicine ===
The dried leaves can be used in teas, liquid diffusions, tea bags or tablets for traditional medicine. Bearberry appears to be relatively safe, although large doses may cause nausea, vomiting, fever, chills, back pain and tinnitus. Cautions for use apply during pregnancy, breast feeding, or in people with kidney disease.

The efficacy and safety of bearberry treatment in humans remain unproven, as no clinical trials exist to interpret effects on any disease.

== History and folklore ==
Bearberry was first documented in The Physicians of Myddfai, a 13th-century Welsh herbal. It was also described by Clusius in 1601, and recommended for medicinal use in 1763 by Gerhard and others. It first appeared in the London Pharmacopoeia in 1788.

Native Americans use bearberry leaves with tobacco and other herbs in religious ceremonies, both as a smudge (type of incense) or smoked in a sacred pipe carrying the smoker's prayers. Among the ingredients in kinnikinnick were non-poisonous sumac leaves, and the inner bark of certain bushes such as red osier dogwood (silky cornell), chokecherry, and alder, to improve the taste of the bearberry leaf.
