= Black huckleberry =

Black huckleberry is a common name for several plants and may refer to:

- Gaylussacia baccata, native to eastern North America
- Vaccinium membranaceum, native to western North America
