= Arctostaphylos rubra =

Conservation status
- Secure (NatureServe)

Scientific classification
- Kingdom: Plantae
- Clade: Tracheophytes
- Clade: Angiosperms
- Clade: Eudicots
- Clade: Asterids
- Order: Ericales
- Family: Ericaceae
- Genus: Arctostaphylos
- Species: A. rubra

Binomial name
- Arctostaphylos rubra (Rehder & Wilson) Fernald

Synonyms
- A. alpina rubra

Species of flowering plant

Arctostaphylos rubra is a species of flowering plant in the heath family and the genus Arctostaphylos, the manzanitas and bearberries. Common names include red fruit bearberry, alpine bearberry, arctic bearberry, red manzanita, and ravenberry. It is native to Eurasia and northern North America from Alaska through most of Canada to Greenland. There is also one population in the contiguous United States, located in the Absaroka Range of Wyoming.

== Description ==
This plant is a low, spreading shrub growing up to 15 centimetres (5.9 inches) tall. The leaves are 2 to 6 centimetres (0.79 to 2.36 inches) long and marcescent, remaining on the shrub as they die. The inflorescence is a hairy, glandular raceme of up to 6 flowers, each about half a centimeter long. The fruit is a drupe. The plant reproduces by seed and by sprouting from stolons and underground rhizomes.

== Distribution and habitat ==
This shrub is a member of many plant communities in Arctic and alpine climates. It occurs in subalpine forests and tundra. It is a common member of forest ecosystems dominated by spruces such as white spruce and black spruce. It may be a dominant species in several types of habitat, including balsam poplar (Populus balsamifera ssp. balsamifera) floodplains and tundra shrublands in Alaska. It is dominant or co-dominant with Engelmann spruce (Picea engelmannii) and cup lichen (Cladonia cariosa and C. pyxidata) in Jasper National Park; white spruce and mountain alder (Alnus viridis ssp. crispa) in the Mackenzie Delta; and white spruce along the Alaska Highway in Yukon. In the lower latitudes the plant grows at higher elevations, especially near the timberline. Its maximum latitude and elevation is thought to be increasing due to climate change. It has a disjunct population in Wyoming, its only known population in the Lower 48.

This shrub grows on low-nutrient soils in cold regions, often soils that overlie permafrost. It is most common in moist areas, such as the shores of lakes and bays, riverbanks, bogs, and wet forest floors. It is often a pioneer species in the primary phase of ecological succession, taking hold in areas cleared of vegetation such as floodplains, bare tundra, cleared spots on taiga, and newly formed dunes. It grows along the scoured edges of receding glaciers and in old bulldozer tracks. Clearing events such as floods, oil spills, and wildfire may increase the abundance of the species.

== Ecology ==
Many animals feed on the fruits, including mammals such as polar bears and other bears, red-backed voles, western heather voles, Dall's sheep, and sometimes caribou and hoary marmots. It is food for birds such as ravens.

It is a good plant to use for revegetation efforts on wet, disturbed habitat in subalpine and boreal regions.

== Uses ==
The fruit is edible for humans but is not a favored food. It has been utilized by the Gwich'in people and the Inuit.
