= False box =

False box or false boxwood is a common name for several plants and may refer to:

- Cornus florida, native to eastern North America and northern Mexico
- Gyminda
- Paxistima myrsinites, native to western North America
