= Kinnikinnick =

Indigenous American herbal smoking mix

Kinnikinnick is a Native American and First Nations smoking mixture made from a traditional combination of leaves or barks. Recipes for the mixture vary, as do the uses, including social, spiritual, and medicinal.

== Etymology ==
The term kinnikinnick derives from the Unami Delaware /kələkːəˈnikːan/, 'mixture' (cf. Ojibwe giniginige 'to mix something animate with something inanimate'), from Proto-Algonquian *kereken-, 'mix (it) with something different by hand'.

By extension, the name was also applied by the colonial European hunters, traders, and settlers to various shrubs of which the bark or leaves are traditionally smoked, most often bearberry (Arctostaphylos spp.) and to lesser degree, the medicinal plants red osier dogwood (Cornus sericea), silky cornel (Cornus amomum), Canadian bunchberry (Cornus canadensis), evergreen sumac (Rhus virens), littleleaf sumac (Rhus microphylla), smooth sumac (Rhus glabra), and staghorn sumac (Rhus typhina).

== Indigenous names ==
- Algonquin: nasemà, 'tobacco' (mitàkozigan, 'unmixed tobacco'; apàkozigan, 'mixed tobacco')
- Dakota and Lakota: čhaŋšáša
- Hul̓q̓umín̓um̓’: Tl’ikw’iyelhp, 'kinnikinnick'
- Lushootseed: k̓ayuk̓ayu, 'kinnikinnick'
- Menominee: ahpa͞esāwān, 'kinnikinnick'
- Odaawaa: semaa, 'tobacco' (mtaaḳzigan, 'unmixed tobacco'; paaḳzigan, 'mixed tobacco')
- Ojibwe: asemaa, 'tobacco' (mitaakozigan, 'unmixed tobacco'; apaakozigan, 'mixed tobacco')
- Shoshoni: äñ′-ka-kwi-nûp, 'kinnikinnick'
- Twana: sQiwat, 'kinnikinnick'
- Winnebago: roxį́šučkéra, 'bark to smoke'

== Preparation and use ==
The preparation varies by locality and nation. Bartlett quotes Trumbull as saying: "I have smoked half a dozen varieties of kinnikinnick in the North-west — all genuine; and have scraped and prepared the red willow-bark, which is not much worse than Suffield oak-leaf."

Eastern tribes have traditionally used Nicotiana rustica for social smoking, while western tribes usually use a variety of kinnikinick for ceremonial use. Cutler cites Edward S. Rutsch's study of the Iroquois, listing ingredients used by other Native American tribes: leaves or bark of red osier dogwood, arrowroot, red sumac, laurel, ironwood, wahoo, huckleberry, Indian tobacco, cherry bark, and mullein, among other ingredients.

Some users of kinnikinnick, including the historical Ho-Chunk in the 1830s, smoked it alone casually, with no apparent social, spiritual, or medicinal purpose. It was considered "preferred by the Indians to tobacco."

== Historical references ==
Among the Ojibwe, Densmore records the following: The material smoked by the Chippewa in earliest times were said to be the dried leaves of the bearberry (Arctostaphylos uva-ursi (L.) Spreng.), and the dried, powdered root of a plant identified as Aster novae-angliae L. Two sorts of bark were smoked, one being known as "red willow" (Cornus stolonifera Michx.) and the other as "spotted willow" (Cornus rugosa Lam.). The inner bark is used, after being toasted over a fire and powdered. It is then stored in a cloth or leather bag, and may be used on its own or in combination with other herbs.

The older hunter watched the singular preparations of his silent son, and suspecting that he had discovered signs of an enemy, arose, and saying he would go and cut a few sticks of the red willow [Kinnikinnick] to smoke, he left the lodge to go and see with his own and more experienced eyes, what were the signs of danger.

— Warren, History of the Ojibway people

Tobacco used in the early day consisted of the inner bark of red dogwood — Indians on all reservations called it 'red willow.' An informant removed the outside bark of a twig with her thumbnail and noted that the remaining layer of bark when carefully shaven off served as tobacco, so-called kinnikinnick. Today kinnikinnick is a mixture of finely crushed inner bark of the red dogwood and shavings of plug tobacco. The mixture is worked with a mortar with pestle, both mortar and pestle being of wood. This mixture, too, is used today for ceremonial smoking.

— Hilger, Chippewa Child Life

Kinnikinic, n. caŋṡaṡa.

— Williamson. An English-Dakota Dictionary

There are also certain creeks where the Indians resort to lay in a store of kinnik-kinnik (the inner bark of the red willow), which they use as a substitute for tobacco, and which has an aromatic and very pungent flavour. It is prepared for smoking by being scraped in thin curly flakes from the slender saplings, and crisped before the fire, after which it is rubbed between the hands into a form resembling leaf tobacco, and stored in skin bags for use. It has a highly narcotic effect on those not habituated to its use, and produces a heaviness sometimes approaching stupefaction, altogether different from the soothing effects of tobacco.

— Ruxton, Geo. Frederick "Life in the Far West" 1848; quoted in "Mountain Men" edited by Rounds, Glen 1966, p.163

== See also ==
- Ceremonial pipe
- Tobacco
- Jamestown weed
- Puke weed
