= Lowbush cranberry =

Lowbush cranberry is a common name for several flowering plants and may refer to:

- Vaccinium oxycoccos, cranberry, a species of flowering plant, widespread throughout the cool temperate northern hemisphere
- Vaccinium vitis-idaea, lingonberry, a small evergreen shrub native to boreal forest and Arctic tundra throughout the Northern Hemisphere
- Viburnum edule, shrub native to northern parts of North America
