= Sungold =

Sungold or Sun Gold may refer to:

== Plants ==
- Sungold apricot
- Sungold, a variety of cherry tomato
- Sungold Chamaecyparis pisifera
- Sungold Prunus mandshurica

== Places ==
- Sungold Hill, James Ross Island, Antarctic Peninsula
- Premier Speedway Sungold Stadium, also known as Sungold Milk Stadium, a dirt track oval in Warrnambool, Australia

== Product brands and companies ==
- SunGold kiwifruit from Zespri
- SunGold Foods from Fargo, North Dakota which makes SunButter
- SunGold tea drink brand from Kroger
- Sungold dairy products from Saputo Inc.
  - Warrnambool Cheese and Butter, subsidiary of Saputo
- Sun Gold from Bidco Africa
- Sungold color from Product Miniature Company

== Other uses ==
- Sungold, a play by Irene N. Watts
- Tsornin, translates to "sungold", a fictional horse in the novel The Blue Sword by Robin McKinley
