= Joey Saputo =

Canadian businessman

- Born: Giuseppe Saputo; September 25, 1964 (age 61); Montreal, Canada
- Occupation: Businessman
- Spouse: Carmie Saputo
- Children: 4
- Parent: Lino Saputo

Giuseppe "Joey" Saputo (born September 25, 1964) is a Canadian businessman, the president of CF Montréal soccer team he founded in 1992, and owner of Saputo Stadium, named for his family's dairy products company Saputo Inc. He is also the chairman of the Italian football club Bologna.

== Family ==
Saputo is the son of Emanuele "Lino" Saputo, the founder, former chairman & CEO, and majority shareholder of Saputo Inc., a Canadian dairy products company that also markets a range of other items including spaghetti sauce. Saputo previously owned Vachon Inc., the snack company responsible for the Jos Louis dessert. Joey Saputo has four sons.

== Career ==
=== Saputo Inc. ===
In 1985, Saputo began working for the family business, Saputo Inc., a dairy processing company founded by his father Lino Saputo in 1954. In 1990, he was promoted to president and chief operating officer of the Dairy Products Division for the United States. After occupying various positions within the organization, he was named Senior Vice President of Commercial and Business Development in January 2004.

=== CF Montréal ===
Saputo was the first president of Montreal Impact in 1992 when the Saputo Group was the team's sole owner. Under his leadership, the club was sold to a group of shareholders in 1999. In 2002, the team was incorporated as a non-profit organization, and he played a "pivotal role in the re-launch of the club" and returned as president. He then spearheaded the construction of Saputo Stadium, the team's new home, inaugurated at Olympic Park, Montreal, on May 19, 2008.

By 2007, he had left the Saputo Group in order to focus on the Impact. In 2012, he led the club's entry into Major League Soccer and oversaw the Saputo Stadium's expansion. Under his leadership, "professional soccer's popularity has soared to unprecedented heights in Quebec", with the Impact having won three championships, two Canadian championships, and reached the finals of the CONCACAF Champions League. In 2021, the Impact were renamed as CF Montréal.

=== Bologna ===
Saputo is the majority shareholder in a consortium (BFC 1909 Lux SPV SA) that bought the Italian football club Bologna on October 15, 2014. He was nominated as the next chairman of the club in an extraordinary general meeting on November 17, 2014, replacing Joe Tacopina, who retained the position until annual general meeting on December 22, 2014.

=== Other activities ===
In addition to his work at the Saputo Group and CF Montreal, Saputo has also been involved in managing his family's assets, consolidated under Jolina Capital ("the Saputo family company"), an asset management company where he was president from March 2001 to January 2004. Jolina Capital is a shareholder—and frequently a majority shareholder—in companies spanning sectors as diverse as food, transportation, softwood lumber, and real estate.

Saputo is currently on the board of directors of TransForce, a publicly traded Canadian transport and logistics company, where he has been an independent director since 1996.

== Philanthropy ==
Saputo is involved in the Montreal community and serves on the boards of the Sainte-Justine University Hospital Centre Foundation, PROCURE, an organization that seeks to prevent and cure prostate cancer, and the Italian-Canadian Community Foundation (his father immigrated from Montelepre, Sicily, in the 1950s).
