= Allansford Cheese World Museum =

Agriculture museum in Victoria, Australia

Coordinates: 38.3955204°S 142.6261895°E

- Established: 7 May 1995
- Location: 5330 Great Ocean Road Allansford Victoria
- Type: Heritage centre
- Website: http://www.cheeseworld.com.au/en/Our-Heritage/Museum

The Cheese World Museum is part of the Allansford Cheese World Tourist complex, located in Allansford, Victoria. The museum contains objects and exhibits related to the farming industry and the history of Australia's dairy industry, including cheese and butter making implements.

The museum is located on the site of the original Warrnambool Cheese and Butter factory, which was established in 1888. The museum also exhibits the history of the company and the growth of the dairy industry in Victoria from the early 1900s.

As well as covering dairy history, the museum also houses a wide range of motor engines and motoring accessories which have been donated and are maintained by the Warrnambool & District Historical Vehicle Club. This collection includes the Dave Lee Vintage Engine Collection, which contains over 110 engines donated by Dave Lee, who was a water hole boring contractor and windmill merchant in the Warrnambool district as well as a Ruston & Hornsby tractor engine.

== Awards ==
The museum was nominated for the Archival Survival award for volunteer-run museums category at the 2014 Victorian Museum Awards.
