= Stephen Hagan (author) =

Australian author and anti-racism campaigner

- Born: 1959 (age 66–67); Cunnamulla, Queensland, Australia
- Education: Marist College Ashgrove; Canberra College of Advanced Education (BA); University of Southern Queensland (MBA, PhD)
- Known for: Writing, Aboriginal rights activism
- Spouse: Rhonda Hagan
- Children: 2

Stephen Hagan (born 1959) is an Australian author and anti-racism campaigner. He is also a newspaper editor, documentary filmmaker, university lecturer, and former diplomat.

== Early life and education ==
Stephen Hagan was born in 1959 in Cunnamulla in South West Queensland, Australia. His father, Jim Hagan, belonged to the Kullili people of the region, while his mother was from the nearby Kooma people. Hagan spent his first seven years living on a camp on the outskirts of the town, before moving into a new house nearby, an experience that helped shape his perceptions of the socio-economic inequalities between the Aboriginal population and white Australians.

Success in high school led to an opportunity to attend boarding school at Marist College Ashgrove in Brisbane. He went on to earn a BA in Further Education at the Canberra College of Advanced Education (1986); he later reported that he became disillusioned with the system after being required to teach with "racist" texts.

In May 2002 he graduated with a Master of Business Administration from the University of Southern Queensland, and earned a PhD at the same university in 2016.

== Career ==
After he left teaching to work with a number of Indigenous organisations, and through them he met and worked under Aboriginal activist Charles Perkins. From there he moved into the Department of Foreign Affairs, gaining a diplomatic post to Colombo in Sri Lanka.

Upon returning to Australia he worked in both the public and private sectors, the latter including venturing into cultural tourism.

In 2005 he published his autobiographical work, The N Word: One Man's Stand. At that time and for some years subsequently, he was a lecturer at the University of Southern Queensland (USQ)

In July 2010, Hagan became editor of the National Indigenous Times. After promising to fix problems with plagiarism at the paper, Hagan left in December 2013. His suit for unfair dismissal was part of the reason the paper went into administration in 2015.

Hagan was awarded a doctorate by USQ in 2016 for a thesis on judicial bias against Indigenous Australians. The thesis was the base for his 2017 book, The Rise and Rise of Judicial Bigotry.

In 2021, Hagan was appointed chief executive of the Townsville Aboriginal and Islander Health Services. His three-year contract was terminated after five months following a unanimous vote by the organisation's board. He subsequently launched an unfair dismissal case against TAIHS.

== Campaigns and incidents ==
Hagan is an anti-racism campaigner.

=== E. S. "Nigger" Brown Stand ===
In 1999, Hagan visited the Clive Berghofer Stadium in Toowoomba, Queensland, and noticed a large sign declaring the name of the E. S. "Nigger" Brown Stand, which had been named after the 1920s rugby league player Edwin Stanley Brown – also known as "Nigger" Brown, possibly in response to his pale skin and blond hair. This prompted a long campaign to have the stand renamed to remove the offending nickname.

Hagan unsuccessfully pursued the case before the High Court and the Federal Court of Australia, both of which rejected his claim.

In 2003 Hagan v Australia was heard before the United Nations' Committee on the Elimination of all forms of Racial Discrimination (CERD). Hagan, the complainant, claimed the naming of the stand was discriminatory against him. The committee recommended that Australia "take the necessary measures to secure the removal of the offending term from the sign".

Hagan wrote about this in his 2005 book The N Word: One Man's Stand.

In 2008, the stand was demolished and the issue was resolved, and Toowoomba Sports Ground Inc agreed not to use the term in the future.

As the dispute went through the courts Hagan was brought close to bankruptcy and received threats, according to his wife, including letters claiming to be from the Ku Klux Klan. As a result of these threats and for the sake of his family, Hagan says, he decided to move house.

=== Coon cheese ===
In 2001, Hagan filed a complaint with the Advertising Standards Bureau after an advertisement for Coon cheese was broadcast during the Academy Awards. In 2008 he stated his belief that the cheese was named after a racial epithet and called on its manufacturer to prove its claim that it was named after American cheesemaker Edward Coon. This followed an earlier unsuccessful complaint to Australian Human Rights Commission in 1999. When announced in 2020 by the brand owners, Saputo Inc., that the name would be changed in the wake of Australian participation in the 2020 Black Lives Matter protests, Hagan declared that it was "a total vindication of 20 years of campaigning." In December 2020, Hagan and Destiny Rogers from QNews published the e-book Coon: More Holes than Swiss Cheese.

In 2021, Hagan commented on Lake Macquarie's council's intention of renaming Coon Island in Swansea. The island was named after a white local coalminer, Herbert Heany, who gained that nickname because of his blackened face when coming home from the mine. The council intended to start considerations about a new name in February 2021, but Hagan insisted it ought to be renamed immediately, without consultation.

=== Toowoomba golliwogs ===
On 1 December 2016, Hagan caused controversy when he labelled Toowoomba the "most racist city in Australia" after a display of nine golliwog dolls were placed by a Terry White Chemists shop underneath a sign inviting shoppers to "Experience a White Christmas". The controversy began when Toowoomba man, author George Helon spotted the dolls placed beneath the sign and circulated a picture of it on Facebook and Twitter. The store's manager apologised and said they would not stock the dolls in the future.

=== Coles Express ===
In June 2020, it was reported that Hagan would sue Coles Express for racial discrimination following an incident at a service station in Townsville where he was asked to pre-pay for fuel. He stated that two white drivers at the same time had not been required to do so.

=== Carlton Football Club song ===
In 2021, Hagan urged the Carlton Football Club to change the tune of its club song, "We Are the Navy Blues". While admitting that the song's lyrics are not racially offensive, he objected to its melody, "Lily of Laguna", and the original and racist heritage of that melody. He said, "It took me 10 years to get the name of the stand changed and now I'm doing the same for another sporting club." The club, supported by several of its Indigenous players, said any racial connotations had been removed from the song 80 years ago and that the objectionable history of its melody was unlikely to have been known to the writers of the lyrics in 1929.

== Personal life ==
Hagan is married to Rhonda Hagan from the Mamu tribe; they have two children.

== Awards and nominations ==
- 2005: Deadly Awards – Outstanding Achievement in Literature, for The N Word: One Man's Stand
- 2006: NAIDOC Person of the Year
- 2007: Winner, ATOM Award for Best Short Documentary, for Nigger Lovers, directed by Rhonda Hagan, produced by Daryl Sparkes and Stephen Hagan
- 2007: Nominated, Inside Film Awards for Best Short Documentary, for Nigger Lovers
- 2024: Shortlisted, Daisy Utemorrah Award for Unpublished Indigenous Junior and Young Adult Fiction in the Western Australian Premier's Book Awards, for Acacia: 6 Eyes on Yesterday
- 2026: Winner, Male Elder Award in the NAIDOC Awards

== Publications ==
- The N Word: One Man's Stand. Magabala Books. 2005. ISBN 978-1-875641-98-7. OCLC 60651773.
- Australia's Blackest Sporting Moments: The Top 100. Ngalga Warralu Publishing. 2006. ISBN 9781921212000.
- The Rise and Rise of Judicial Bigotry. Christine Fejo-King Consulting. 2017. ISBN 9780994382733. OCLC 1002924989.
- with Rogers, Destiny (2020). Coon: More Holes than Swiss Cheese (e-book). Self via Smashwords. ISBN 9781005711894.
- Acacia: 6 Eyes on Yesterday. Magabala Books. 2025.
