= Lino Saputo =

Canadian businessman (b. 1937)

Lino Saputo CM OQ
- Born: Emanuele Saputo; 10 June 1937 (age 89); Montelepre, Sicily, Italy
- Citizenship: Italy; Canada
- Occupation: Businessman
- Known for: Founder of Saputo Inc.
- Children: 3, including Joey Saputo

Emanuele "Lino" Saputo, CM OQ (Italian: [emanuˈɛːle liːno saˈpuːto]; born 10 June 1937) is an Italian-Canadian billionaire businessman. He is the founder of the Canadian cheese manufacturer Saputo Inc. According to Forbes, he has an estimated net worth of US$4.7 billion as of November 2022.

== Early life ==
Saputo was born in Montelepre, Sicily, Italy, in 1937, to Giuseppe Saputo, a cheesemaker, and his wife Maria. Giuseppe and Frank, his eldest son, immigrated to Montreal, Quebec, Canada in 1950, and two years later, Lino joined his father and brother in Canada, along with his mother Maria, his brother Luigi, as well as his sisters Rosalia, Elina, Maria and Antonina.

== Career ==
Saputo became chairman of the board and president of Saputo Inc. in 1969, and he was named chairman and chief executive officer (CEO) in 1997 when the company went public. In March 2004, his son Lino Saputo Jr. was appointed to the position of president and CEO, while Saputo continued as the company's chairman. In August 2017, Lino Saputo Jr. assumed the role of chairman, and Saputo remains the majority shareholder of Saputo Inc.

Saputo was named in the 2017 Paradise Papers because he held shares in an offshore company, an aviation company, in Bermuda which he had sold off in 2010. A spokesperson said that "was justified for business reasons and not for fiscal considerations".

== Other interests ==
Saputo owns a significant stake in a trucking company, TransForce, and has extensive investments in real estate, forest products, hotels and golf courses.

Saputo has a strong interest in hockey, and he founded a hockey player agency called Quartexx Management.

Saputo founded the Amelia and Lino Saputo Jr. Foundation in 2011, which has as a mission to education and support future generations.

== Honours ==
In 2011, Saputo was made an Officer of the National Order of Quebec. He was appointed a member of the Order of Canada (CM) in 2012, per the Government House announcement on June 29, 2012, and the Canada Gazette on September 1, 2012.

Saputo's son Lino Saputo Jr. was named "Canada's Outstanding CEO of the Year" for 2019 by the Financial Post.

== Alleged mob ties ==
Links between Saputo and American mobster Joe Bonanno have been evidenced between 1964 and 1979. Saputo has admitted to meeting with Bonanno in May 1964 at his factory in Saint-Michel, where Giuseppe Saputo offered Bonanno a 20% stake in his company. Bonanno mentions the episode in his 1983 autobiography A Man of Honor, claiming the two had only met at the insistence of a mutual friend. Saputo claimed the father was cancelled the deal after learning of Bonanno's mob ties.

=== 2008 defamation lawsuit ===
In March 2008, Saputo Inc. launched three defamation lawsuits against the owners of three Canadian newspapers over stories that were published in December 2007 alluding to Lino Saputo being linked to organized crime. Saputo sued CTVGlobemedia, the publisher of The Globe and Mail, Quebecor Inc., which owns the Sun Media Group of Papers, and Gesca Ltd, the owner of Montreal's La Presse newspaper. Company CEO Lino Saputo Jr. claimed the articles contained false allegations against his father and the company as a whole. An Italian weekly magazine, L'Espresso, was also being sued for articles that ran in November of the same year.

=== 2020 CBC investigation ===
A 2020 investigation by Enquête reported that Saputo, contrary to his claims of no contact with Bonanno after May 1964, had been reported by an FBI informant as having met him in Tucson in 1970. Further investigations by the FBI and DEA found evidence of contact between the two over the next nine years. Investigator Eugene Ehmann was quoted by CBC, "They just had a relationship, and it was a longtime one." Saputo allegedly funneled US$51,000 (US$210,000 in 2020) from his brother-in-law and business partner Giuseppe Borsellino, who is known to have corresponded with Bonanno and have had links to the Rizzuto crime family, to the mobster. Borsellino, whom RCMP investigators identified as a pseudonymous Bonanno associated known as "Peppo Freddo" (literally 'Cold Peppo', 'Peppo' being a diminutive of 'Giuseppe'), is known to have had links to the Rizzuto family of Montreal.

In 1980, Saputo was refused a business permit in New York by Appeals Court Judge Charles D. Breitel, for his alleged ties to Saputo.

== See also ==
- List of cheesemakers
