= Pitzuchim =

Colloquial term referring to varieties of nuts and seeds

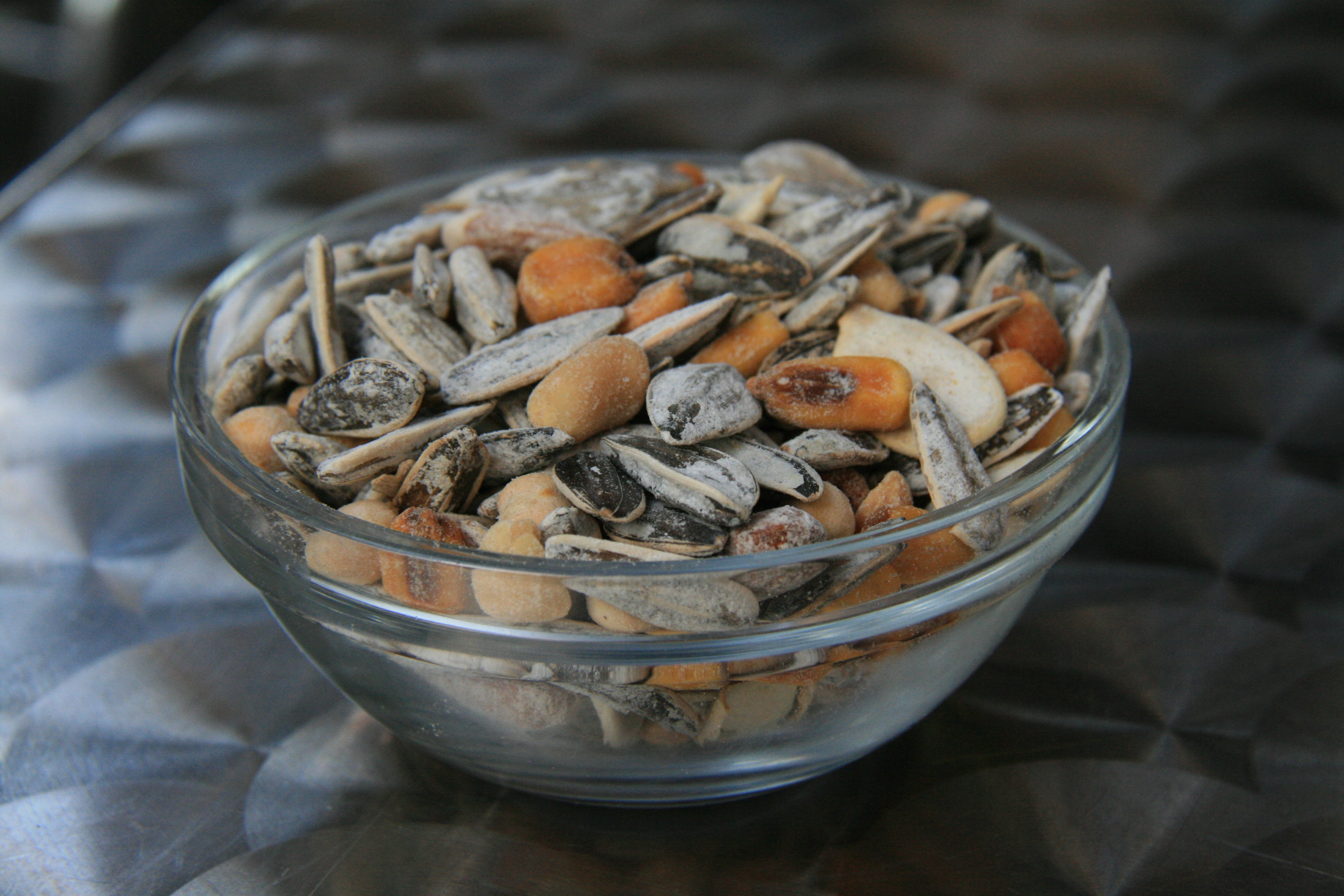
A bowl of mixed Pitzuchim

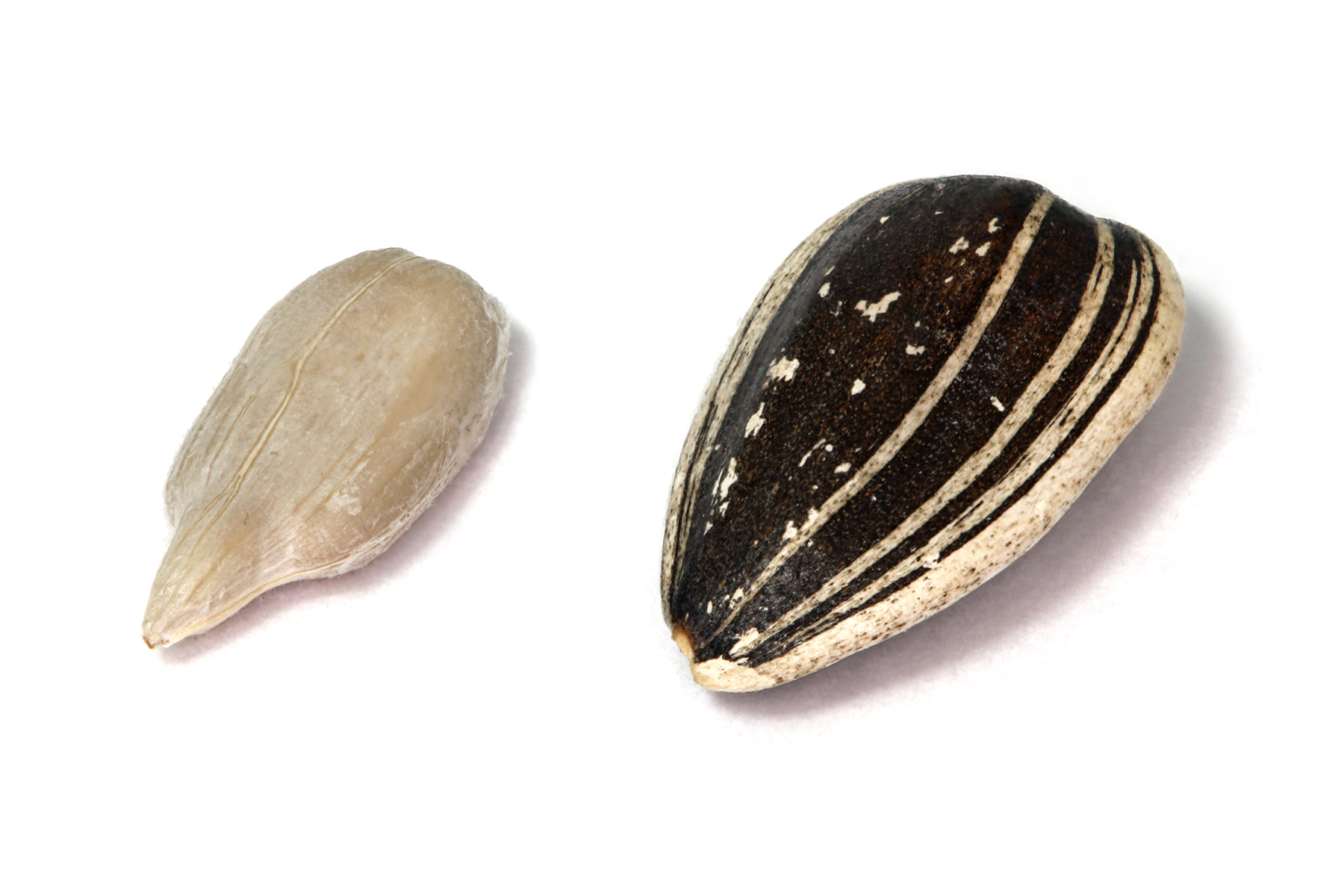
A sunflower seed, a popular snack, before and after being cracked out of its shell with ones' teeth

In Israel, Pitzuchim (Hebrew: פיצוחים, lit. crackables) is a colloquial term referring to varieties of nuts and seeds that are cracked open with ones' teeth and eaten as a snack.

Among the popular Pitzuchim are sunflower seeds (also called "גרעינים שחורים", "black seeds"), pumpkin seeds (also known as "גרעינים לבנים", "white seeds"), and watermelon seeds. Pitzuchim are a popular snack at soccer games. Less popular varieties of Pitzuchim include more expensive nuts, such as pistachios, Brazil nuts, cashews, almonds and more.

The Israeli Ministry of Health recommends that children under the age of five not be allowed to eat Pitzuchim because of the danger of suffocation. In addition, consuming large amounts of kernels without removing the shell can cause bowel obstruction.

Pitzuchim are commonly sold in the form of pre-packaged plastic bags in supermarket and local grocery stores, or by weight in health food stores or kiosks that include a stall of Pitzuchim. A kiosk that sells Pitzuchim is called a "פיצוחיה" or "פיצוציה", Pitzuchiya or Pitzutziya, where the nuts or seeds are usually roasted on location and sold by weight, often packaged in brown paper bags.
