= Jack Bristow (footballer) =

Australian rules footballer

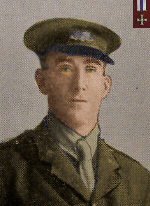
- Bristow in his World War I uniform

Personal information
- Full name: John Mountsteven Bristow
- Born: 30 September 1886; Allansford, Victoria
- Died: 22 November 1954 (aged 68); Lakes Entrance, Victoria
- Original team: Carlton Juniors
- Height: 177 cm (5 ft 10 in)
- Weight: 75 kg (165 lb)

Playing career^{1}
Years	Club	Games (Goals)
1910	Carlton	2 (2)
1912–13	Melbourne	21 (0)
1913	Richmond	5 (0)
Total		28 (2)
- ^{1} Playing statistics correct to the end of 1913.

John Mountsteven Bristow (30 September 1886 – 22 November 1954) was an Australian rules footballer who played with Carlton, Melbourne and Richmond in the Victorian Football League (VFL).
