= Murray Goulburn Co-operative =

Murray Goulburn dairy co-operative

Murray Goulburn Co-operative Co. Limited
- Industry: Food Processing
- Founded: 1950
- Headquarters: Southbank, Melbourne, Victoria, Australia
- Products: Milk; Butter; Cheese
- Revenue: + A$ 2.4 billion (2012/13)
- Number of employees: 2,000 approx
- Website: https://www.mgcl.com.au/about-us

Murray Goulburn Co-operative Co. Limited (also known as Devondale Murray Goulburn) was a dairy-processing co-operative corporation. In 2018, following financial difficulties and difficulties with suppliers over sustainable prices, the business assets were sold to Saputo Inc, a publicly listed Canadian dairy company. Later the trading name of the business was changed to AG Warehouse. The co-operative was placed into liquidation in 2020.

The agricultural co-operative was formed in 1950 from a group of dairy farms and grew to become Australia's largest processor of milk.

In 2016, turmoil engulfed the processor as the milk price fell below production costs, prompting calls for the board to be sacked or the co-operative to be sold. Thereafter, the former chief executive of Carlton & United Breweries, Ari Mervis, was appointed to the role of CEO and Managing Director and commenced his role on 13 February 2017.

== Profile ==
Devondale Murray Goulburn has nine manufacturing plants located in Victoria and Tasmania. It has over 2,500 suppliers and supports over 2,000 employees, processing over 35% of Australia's milk supply (3.3 billion litres) into products that are sold to both domestic and export markets.

The company trades in over 100 countries; it is the largest container user in the Port of Melbourne, exporting in excess of 375,000 MT (23,500 containers) within a financial year. Its international business accounts for approximately 9% of the world's dairy trade. It has an annual turnover of approximately A$2.4 billion.

The company's processing plants have been accredited as ISO 9001:2000 manufacturing facilities and are certified by the NSF HACCP – 9000 standard for hazard analysis and critical control points and good manufacturing practice. Its compliance with finished product specifications is independently validated by Dairy Technical Services, located in Melbourne, Victoria.

In early 2010 and again in October 2013, Devondale Murray Goulburn made a bid to take over Warrnambool Cheese and Butter Factory Company Holdings. In 2014, Canadian dairy giant Saputo, Inc. successfully bought into Warrnambool, acquiring 85% of the company's shares.

In February 2016, Devondale Murray Goulburn won a five-year supply contract with Coles Supermarkets, supplying private-label, daily pasteurised milk as well as cheddar-style cheese in blocks, shreds and slices for Victoria and NSW. In July, however, the company was dropped as a supplier by Woolworths, costing the co-operative approximately A$108 million.

In May 2018, the company was sold to Saputo Inc. for $1.31 billion.

== Business units and brands ==
- Devondale (consumer brand of milk and cheese)
- Liddells - Lactose free dairy products
- Corporate brands division (supplier to Consumer Brands)
- MG Nutritionals (research division)
- MG Ingredients (supplier of whey, milk powder, concentrate, casein)
- MG Qingdao Dairy
- MG Trading
- Ascend - Proven Sports Proteins

== Controversy ==
In early 2016, the managing director of Devondale Murray Goulburn, Gary Helou, left the company after concerns were raised internally about large losses being made, followed by a profit downgrade and a subsequent farmgate milk price slash just after the co-operative partially listed on the stock exchange. The company then slashed the price dairy farmers had been expecting for their milk, and instituted a A$200 million clawback on milk that had already been acquired where the 2,500 farmers would have to pay back the difference. This resulted in farmers being paid less than what it cost to produce milk for the company. The company's behaviour was documented in an exposé by the Four Corners program in August 2016.
