= Edward William Coon =

American cheesemaker

- Born: Edward Willie Coons; 31 July 1871; Philadelphia, Pennsylvania, U.S.
- Died: 12 January 1934 (aged 62); Philadelphia, Pennsylvania, U.S.
- Occupation: Cheesemaker
- Employer: Kraft-Phenix Cheese Company
- Known for: Patented process for ripening cheese
- Spouses: Frances Gregory Reinhold (1904–1923); Mary Lewis Parker (married 1924)

Edward William Coon (31 July 1871 – 12 January 1934) was an American produce merchant and cheesemaker, who patented a cheese-ripening process that eschewed pasteurization, instead retaining the live bacteria to produce a cheese that was said to be more easily digested and have a more attractive flavor. His cheese-making process and name were drawn into the media spotlight in the wake of a controversy surrounding the name of the Australian Coon cheese.

== Early life ==
Coon was born on 31 July 1871, in Philadelphia, to Ephraim Coons and Mary Ann Coons (née Partridge), registered as Edward Willie Coons.

As a young adult, Coon began working for his father and uncle as a salesman for their company Coon Bros & Co.

== Career ==
Following the collapse of the family business, Coon went into business for himself purchasing a store building in Philadelphia.

In March 1915, Coon rented a closed cheese factory in Edwards, New York hiring W.E Walker as a cheesemaker, and opening for business on April 1. By this time Coon was operating under the business name E.W. Coon & Co, and was among New York's best known cheese merchants having established a national reputation as a purveyor of Yankee cheeses, and having extensive business exporting cheese to England and Italy.

In June 1915, Coon further expanded his business, purchasing the Cleveland seed warehouses in Cape Vincent, New York, and remodelling them for use as a storage plant for cheese and butter. The remodelling of the plant was done in a novel way, differing from that of traditional refrigeration techniques by making use of a large number of tiles to make the storage facility resemble as near as possible the hold of an ocean liner. The factory was burnt down in April 1921, destroying 60 carloads of Italian cheese and 300 carloads of American cheese. Coon was subsequently involved in long litigation involving 11 insurance companies, eventually recovering $120,000.

In August 1923, The Journal and Republican of Lowville, New York, reported the sale by "E. W. Coon of Philadelphia, maker and shipper of cheese", of five milk plants in villages around Watertown to the Dairymen's League Co Operative Association, Inc. It also stated that

While no announcement is made as to which of the numerous Coon plants in northern New York have been bought by the League, it is understood that the big Cape Vincent plant is not among those transferred... The Coon chain of plants include stations at Brownville, Chaumont, Rosiere, Cape Vincent, Clayton and La Fargeville, with several cheese factories in the surrounding territory... Mr Coon's business has been cheese making primarily...

In August 1924, Coon purchased two factories in Wisconsin Rapids, one being the former Reiland Packing Co. building, and the other formerly the Falk American Potato and Flour Corporation, described as the "largest cheese storage plant in the state of Wisconsin" Under the business name Acme Cheese Development and Storage, the former Falk site was transformed, and employed between 15 and 25 people for both storing cheese and processing cheese. Cheese processed at the facility was done so in line with Coon's 1926 patent and produced a cheese described as taking on a "sharp, nippy taste which improves its quality". The cheese was marketed as "COON-Sharp Cheese". The Reiland plant was sold later in 1924 to Dairy State Cold Storage Co, under the management of R.T. Gillespie. His company became a subsidiary of Kraft Cheese Company around 1925-1926 before their acquisition of Coon's company. This plant continued to make cheese according to the "Coon patented" "cave-cure" treatment of cheese, and continued its operation after Gillespie's passing on 1936.

At one time, Coon operated 14 cheese factories in New York State (in existence 1928–1930).

In 1928, Coon was made an offer by the Kraft-Phenix Cheese Company (in existence 1928–1930) for his company and its assets, including cheese factories in Wisconsin, storehouses in Philadelphia, and his patent for ripening cheese. Kraft-Phenix paid $732,983.25 for the business and Coon was kept on as manager until his death in 1934.

== Cheese-making patent ==
On 27 February 1926, Coon filed an application for a Process for Ripening Cheese with the U.S. Patent Office, for "certain new and useful Improvements in Processes for Ripening Cheese". Patent No 1579196 was issued on 30 March 1926.

The patent describes a method "to provide a process for the ripening of cheese through the agency of humidified air at certain temperatures supplied to the cheese ripening chamber". The common methods of ripening cheese at the time involved storing cheese covered in paraffin wax at temperatures between 40 and 80 degrees Fahrenheit through the means of artificial refrigeration using ammonia gas or carbon dioxide gas pumped through pipes within the room. This method dehumidified the air and drew the moisture from the cheese creating a finished product that was dry and crumbly. The aging process took a long time and often produced rind rot, spoiling the cheese. Coon's processes, being of much shorter duration, eliminated both the dryness and rind rot in the finished product, producing a cheese in which the lactic bacilli were cultivated to the highest degree, providing for better digestion of the cheese.

His method explicitly excluded pasteurization, which kills all bacteria and therefore allows cheese to last for much longer when stored.

Coon claimed that "unparaffined cheese shrinks in weight very considerably as it is held for the purpose of ripening in a room or chamber set aside for that purpose, due to the contained moisture evaporating through the cheese rind" and determined that the moisture percentage of rooms for cheese ripening should be maintained at near the saturation point of the cheese. He further noted that paraffined cheeses are practically hermetically sealed and therefore do not ripen as rapidly as if they had not been paraffined.

He stated in the patent claim that his process "consists of supplying humidified air at certain specified temperatures through suitable means to a room set aside for the purpose," and that "the humidified air to have a temperature range of from-45 degrees to 75 degrees Fahrenheit, and a moisture percentage of from 65% to 95%", claiming that his many years of experimenting had developed this particular process and group of temperature and humidity percentage ranges.

Coon's "cave-cure" method as described in the patent were purchased along with his company and its assets by Kraft-Phenix in 1928, who continued to make the cheese for Kraft under the brand name "Kraft Wisconsin White Cheddar".

It was noted in 1954 that while "Coon cheese is fairly well known, it is not a very popular cheese when compared with other cheeses". Kraft never licensed the patent for Coon cheese, and no infringement suits were ever brought based upon it.

== Relationship to Australian COON Cheese ==
A link between the Australian cheese branded as Kraft COON Cheese and Coon was first made by Kraft Foods Inc. in 1988 in response to questioning by journalists from The Sydney Morning Herald over the continued usage of the brand name despite it also being used as a derogatory term for Indigenous Australians. An Australian cheese had been made first as "Red Coon" in 1931, and from about 1959 under the brand COON, by the Kraft Walker Cheese Co.

Various versions of the company history have listed different stories linking Coon to the Australian cheese with various inconsistent claims as to Coon's relationship to the cheese brand, his education, the nature of his patent, and the dates the cheese was produced.

In January 2021 the owners of the COON brand, Saputo Inc., announced the renaming of the brand to CHEER, which would be labelled as such from July 2021, in line with "current attitudes and perspectives".

== Family and death ==
Coon married Frances Gregory Reinhold at the Holy Trinity Church in Philadelphia on September 3, 1904. Frances died in May 1922. He married Mrs. Mary Lewis Parker in Manhattan on March 27, 1925, when he was 53 years old and she 51. There were no children of either marriage.

Coon died on 12 January 1934, aged 62, in Philadelphia, of a heart attack.
