= Cheer cheese =

Australian cheese brand

Cheer
- Type: Cheese
- Inception: 1931 as Red Coon; from 1959 as Coon; from 2021 as Cheer
- Manufacturer: Warrnambool Cheese and Butter, Allansford, Victoria, Australia
- Website: cheercheese.com.au
- Notes; Parent company is Saputo Inc.

Cheer (stylised as CHEER; formerly Coon) is the Australian trademark of a cheddar cheese (known as "tasty" in Australia) produced by the Warrnambool Cheese and Butter company, which is majority-owned by Canadian dairy company Saputo Inc.

The Kraft Walker Cheese Co. (a partnership between Fred Walker and James L. Kraft) launched a cheese known as "Red Coon" around 1931. In October 1949, Kraft Foods Inc. registered the trademark "COON" for cheese with the US Patent Office, claiming use since 1910.

The Australian company marketing the Coon brand originally stated on their website (2012) that the name derived from the American cheesemaker Edward Coon of Philadelphia, who patented a method in the US in 1926 for fast maturation of cheese via high temperature and humidity;

In July 2021, "Coon" cheese was rebranded as "Cheer" cheese.

== History ==
=== Background ===
In 1916, Fred Walker – after having had some success with manufacturing foods – learnt of Chicago businessman James L. Kraft's processing method of halting the maturation of cheese. Walker went to the United States to meet him and acquire the Australian rights to use this method. He began a partnership with Kraft to manufacture this "processed cheese" in 1925, and in May 1926, the Kraft Walker Cheese Co. was registered – the parent company of Kraft Foods Ltd. Kraft Walker then began to make processed "Kraft Cheddar Cheese" at their South Melbourne plant.

=== Red Coon (1931–1959) ===
From around July 1931, (Note: Old web page incorrectly says November 1935.) a cheese was marketed by Kraft Walker Cheese Co. as "Red Coon", which was "not processed in any way, but very finely matured by a secret method, which gives it a distinctive mellow flavor and smooth consistency". The same article refers to "special technical staff, which [were] engaged in the preparation of new products", including Red Coon. The cheese was also advertised as being "2 years old".

Walker had hired Cyril Callister as chief scientist and production superintendent of his factory, and it was he who had formulated Vegemite and the Kraft Walker recipe for processed cheese. Callister also built up a well-staffed laboratory at the factory. According to author, academic and activist Stephen Hagan, Red Coon cheese used a different method to Coon's, as it was pasteurised, which was not part of his patented process.

In November 1934 Kraft Walker leased the factory owned by Warrnambool Cheese and Butter at Allansford, and soon expanded it.

Red Coon was coated with red wax, later replaced with cellophane, and the red stripe in the current logo is a residual reference to the original packaging. It also said that production of Red Coon paused in December 1942 because of World War II, and began again in June 1948 at Allansford and also at Quinalow on the Darling Downs in Queensland. On 7 October 1949, Kraft Foods registered the trademark "COON" with the US Patent Office, claiming use since 1910.

In November 1951, a new Kraft-Walker factory, primarily for the manufacture of processed cheese, was opened in Northgate, Brisbane. The buildings included a cool store for Red Coon cheese, which was being made at Quinalow in Queensland, and described as "mature cheese". It is described as "mature" in many advertisements and articles in the 1950s, although one article explicitly excludes it from the category of Cheddar cheeses.

"Red Coon" cheese was referred to in a discussion about grading cheese in the Queensland Parliament in December 1958.

=== Coon (1959–2021) ===
In 1959, Coon "Tasty" cheese started appearing in the press, with an illustrated advertisement showing labels which call the processed product "cheddar" and the Coon variety, sold in 8-ounce (230 g) packages, described as "Kraft natural tasty Coon Cheese, fully matured", with a "robust flavour men really appreciate". A 1961 ad, also in the Australian Women's Weekly, shows a slightly different label, including the information that it is "Manufactured in Melbourne" by Kraft Foods Ltd. The ad says it is "aged to full maturity", and its marketing suggests its appeal to "active men".

=== 21st century ===
Lion Dairy & Drinks operated the brand for some years, until Warrnambool Cheese and Butter bought back the brand in May 2015. Warrnambool Cheese and Butter is majority-owned by Canadian dairy company Saputo Inc.

On 13 January 2021, Lino A. Saputo, the chair and CEO of Saputo Inc., announced the rebranding of the cheese under the name "Cheer", following years of controversy over its name.

On 9 November 2022, Saputo Australia announced that the company will close its Maffra factory in the Gippsland region of Victoria, and lay off up to 75 workers following issues with milk supply and a A$54.4 million annual losses. The company generated a A$30.6 million net profit in the previous year.

== Naming controversy ==
The former product name, which it shared with a racial slur, was defended by previous manufacturers Kraft Foods and Dairy Farmers despite decades-long campaigns to change it, including through challenges to the Australian Human Rights Commission in 1999 and Advertising Standards Bureau in 2001 by activist Stephen Hagan. In the public debate raised by the campaign to change it, some of those who objected to the change of name claimed that the term was not used as a derogatory term in Australia, rather being an American racist term. However, Hagan and QNews reporter Destiny Rogers have said that the research in their e-book, COON: More Holes than Swiss Cheese, shows the term was used in Australia as a derogatory term for Indigenous Australians as well as other people of colour, and was especially common between the 1870s and 1939 before fading from the language during World War II and coming back into use in the 1970s.

Hagan again challenged the name in 2008, and said that Dairy Farmers had told him that it was named after Edward Coon, "who revolutionised the speeding process of making cheese". According to Hagan, this story had only first been mentioned by the brand owners in the 1980s.

In the wake of the 2020 Black Lives Matter protests in Australia, on 24 July 2020 Saputo Inc. announced the name would be changed.

On 13 January 2021, Lino A. Saputo, the chair and CEO of Saputo Inc., announced the new name as "Cheer" cheese. He said, "Treating people with respect and without discrimination is one of our basic principles". A number of other Australian companies also rebranded some of their products which have names with racist connotations in 2020, and others face pressure to do so.

As of 2021, Hagan is claiming legal damages of A$2.1 million for what he calls "21 years of corporations undermining his claims that the cheese brand was not named after...William Edward Coon".

== Coon's process ==
In 1926, American entrepreneur and cheesemaker Edward William Coon of Philadelphia patented a method for fast maturation of cheese via high temperature and humidity, His method explicitly excluded pasteurisation, which kills all bacteria and therefore allows cheese to last for much longer when stored. Coon once operated 14 cheese factories in New York State, before selling the businesses and going to work for the Kraft-Phenix Cheese Company in Philadelphia in 1928. He sold his patent for ripening cheese at the same time. Coon was kept on as manager until his death in 1934.

From around October 1942, Kraft began to market a cheese as "Kraft Coon cheese" in the US, although it was not registered as a trademark until 1949.

== See also ==
- Dairy farming in Australia
- List of cheesemakers
