= Jos Louis =

Canadian confection

- Current owner: Vachon Inc. a division of Canada Bread
- Country: Canada
- Markets: Canada, United States
- Previous owners: Arcade Vachon and his wife Rose-Anna Giroux later bought by Saputo Inc.
- Website: http://www.vachon.com/

Jos Louis is a Canadian confection consisting of two chocolate cake rounds with a creamy filling within a milk chocolate shell, made by Vachon Inc. It resembles a chocolate version of the May West dessert. It was created in 1932 and named after two of the Vachon sons, Joseph and Louis ("Jos" is a traditional contraction of "Joseph"). However, as the May West was named after the popular American actress Mae West, a misconception exists that the Jos Louis was named after the popular American boxer Joe Louis born in 1914.

== Variations ==
The Jos Louis is also available in a 30-gram half-moon shape, called the 1/2 Jos Louis, and a bar-shaped version called the Jos Louis bar. The bar contains the normal creamy filling found in the Jos Louis and also has a chocolate filling and weighs 53 grams. The ½ Moon cake is essentially a Jos Louis without the chocolaty coating, but has a smaller portion size of 51 grams. The ½ Moon is available in either chocolate or vanilla. A double-layered variant, the Super Jos Louis, has two layers of creamy filling in the middle.

In 2006, Entenmann's began distributing an equivalent of the ½ Moon in the US, with "Enten-Mini's Chocolate Half Rounds".
