= SunButter =

Brand of sunflower seed butter

- Type: Spread
- Place of origin: United States
- Created by: Sungold Foods
- Main ingredients: Sunflower seeds

SunButter is a brand of sunflower seed butter. It is an edible food paste similar to peanut butter, mainly used as a sandwich spread by people with peanut allergies and/or tree nut allergies. SunButter is manufactured by SunGold Foods, Inc. in Fargo, North Dakota.

== History ==
Beginning in 2000, in cooperation with the Agricultural Research Service of the United States Department of Agriculture, SunGold Foods' parent company, Red River Commodities, began a two-year project to develop a substitute for peanut butter that would be made from sunflower seeds.

At that same time, Red River Commodities invested in new sunflower seed hybrids and specialized production areas, formed SunGold Foods, Inc. and created a peanut-free and tree-nut free food processing, packaging, distribution and shipping environment at both companies' locations.

The substitute for peanut butter, introduced in 2002, became known as SunButter.

== Health benefits ==
Sunflower seeds are a good source of protein, fiber, vitamin E, zinc and iron. SunButter is currently used as an added ingredient in a variety of foods, including energy bars from Enjoy Life Foods and EnerPro, granola, premade sandwiches and a no-peanut peanut sauce.

== Distribution ==
SunButter is now available in a variety of flavors, and is found in grocery chains and health food stores. It is used in many institutional foodservice programs, including public and private schools and school districts that have become peanut-free and tree-nut free as part of the Food Allergy and Anaphylaxis Management Act (FAAMA), which calls for voluntary national guidelines to help schools manage students affected by food allergy and anaphylaxis.

== See also ==
- List of spreads
