= Sunflower butter =

Paste made from sunflower seeds

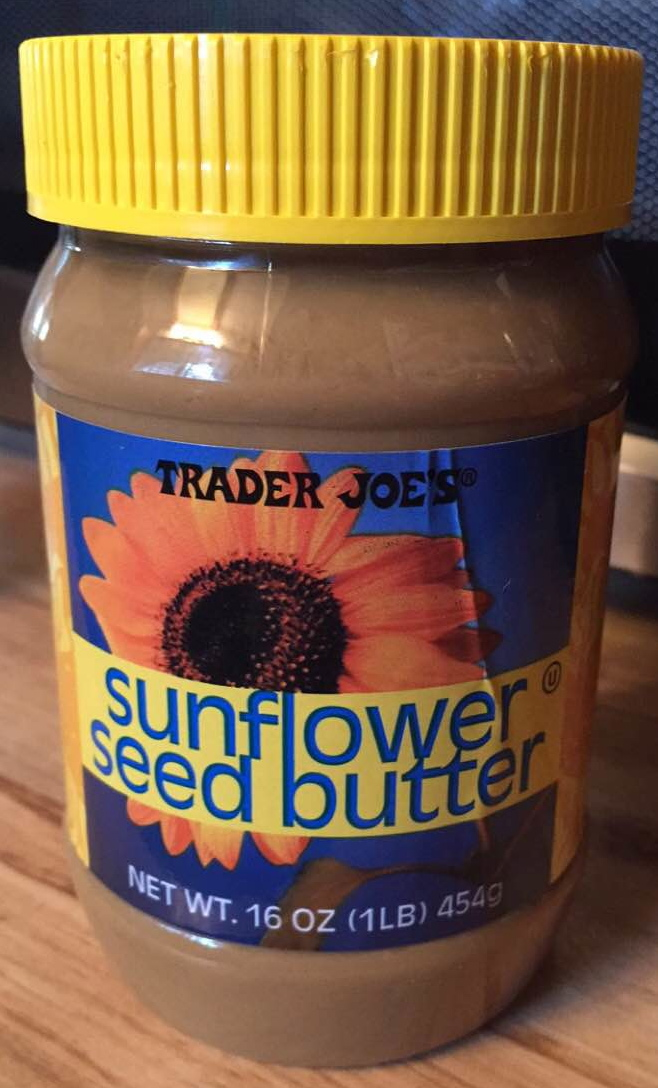
- Alternative names: Sunflower seed butter, sunbutter
- Type: Spread
- Main ingredients: Sunflower seeds

Sunflower butter, also known as sunflower seed butter, is a seed butter made by grinding seeds from the common sunflower into a paste. Sunflower butter is commonly used as a substitute for peanut butter when allergies are a concern.

== History ==
U.S. commercial versions of sunflower butter were first introduced in the early 1980s as alternatives to peanut butter, particularly for those with nut allergies or peanut allergies. These attempts were unsuccessful, which was attributed to issues with its greenish appearance, "poor texture", and a bitter, under-roasted taste.

Two decades later, in 2000, researchers at the Agricultural Research Service of the Department of Agriculture, working with sunflower seed processor Red River Commodities, developed a formulation that "resembled the texture, flavor, and nutty appearance of commercially available peanut butter", focusing on the degree of roasting and the amounts of sugar, salt, and stabilizer (hydrogenated cottonseed and rapeseed oils). Their subsidiary, SunGold Foods, Inc., introduced their sunflower seed butter, marketed under the name SunButter, in 2002. By 2011, SunButter became available at major grocery retailers.

Several major grocery chains and online retailers now produce store-brand sunflower butter. Sunflower seed butter can also be made in home kitchens using a food processor or high speed blender.

== Potential allergen ==
Due to the prevalence of peanut allergies, schools may offer peanut-free menu options or implement entirely nut-free policies. Sunflower butter may be an alternative in schools where peanut butter and other nuts are banned, although some people with peanut allergies may also be allergic to sunflower seed butter.

Sunflower butter can also be used as a dip for fruit and vegetables, in a sandwich, or in recipes that call for peanut butter; peanut butter, however, contains higher levels of protein.

== See also ==
- List of spreads
