= Bread price-fixing in Canada =

2018 scandal in Canada

A bread price-fixing scandal emerged in Canada in 2015, when it was discovered that a group of competing bread producers, retailers and supermarket chains had colluded to artificially inflate the price of bread at the wholesale and retail levels from late 2001 to 2015 (some sources stated that the price fixing continued into 2017). The Competition Bureau of Canada alleged, in court documents released 31 January 2018, that seven Canadian bread companies committed indictable offences in what journalist Michael Enright later termed "the great Canadian bread price-fixing scandal" of 2018. Penalties can range from $25 million to a prison term of 14 years.

== History ==
The Competition Bureau said that Canadians had been "victimized" over a 14-year or 16-year period, and noted that the scheme inflated the price of bread by at least $1.50. It became known to insiders as the "7/10 convention", according to the bureau documents: a usual seven cent price increase at wholesale and ten cent price bump for the consumer in stores, typically twice a year. In addition to bread, other baked goods such as bagels, naans, English muffins, and tortillas were also affected by the price-fixing scheme. Between 2001 and 2015, the consumer price index for bread, rolls, and buns rose by 96 per cent, according to Statistics Canada, while during that same time, the CPI for all food purchased from stores increased about 45 per cent.

=== Scheme ===
The Competition Bureau alleged that the senior officers of wholesale fresh bread rivals Canada Bread, owned by Maple Leaf Foods at the time and later became a Grupo Bimbo subsidiary since 23 May 2014, and Weston Foods, then a sister company to Loblaw Companies under parent George Weston Limited, colluded to boost bread prices. Canada Bread and Weston Foods then met with retailers to increase their prices in tandem. The retailers who participated in the scheme, including Loblaws, Walmart Canada, Giant Tiger, Sobeys and Metro, allegedly "demanded" that the bread suppliers actively manage their retail competition by co-ordinating bread prices between the retailers.

According to evidence in court filing, at one point in 2012, Weston Foods had not announced a price increase for its bread products. Canada Bread, in turn, also cancelled its price hike which led to Weston Foods not going through the price hike. Afterwards, a Canada Bread employee approached a Weston Foods staff and expressed displeasure over the failed price hike. This led to a "sense of urgency" in the bakery industry around the scheduled price hike in October 2012.

=== Informant tip-off ===
The bureau was approached by informants from Loblaws in 2015 and filed the affidavit late in 2017 along with evidence in order to convince a judge to grant it search warrants, which it executed on 31 October 2017. Loblaws and Weston Foods became aware of the investigation on 31 October 2017, and decided to co-operate with investigators in December in exchange for receiving immunity from prosecution.

A statement issued by Canada Bread noted that the George Weston and Loblaws informants admitted to inappropriate conduct and accused "certain former Canada Bread executives" dating back to 2001 "while Canada Bread was under previous ownership."

The affidavit by Loblaws also refers to a series of alleged incidents and emails that appear to implicate senior officials at bread suppliers and relevant category managers at the retailers:

Retail customers would call threatening to reject a price increase if another retailer was offside in terms of pricing alignment. None of them wanted to be the first to implement the price increase. There was always a negotiation process going back and forth between the four retailers where the supplier was trying to coordinate it, because somebody had to be the first to move.

== Analysis ==
An academic from Dalhousie University, Sylvain Charlebois who is a professor of "food distribution and policy" said that he had previously been unaware of this issue, and "Now, I'm asking myself where else in the grocery store is there collusion other than bread. That's the real question, I think."

In an analysis performed by Grier and published by Markusoff, the cost differential between actual and normative CPI data, of a weekly loaf purchase over the decade-and-a-half interval, was on the order of 400 dollars. Markusoff notes that "According to the Bureau of Labor Statistics, American consumers saw bread prices rise half as fast as happened in Canada during the time of Loblaws' misconduct."

== Consequences ==
On January 8, 2018, in an attempt to pacify public opinion, Loblaws offered a $25 gift card, which it announced in early December 2017. The retailer expected as many as six million Canadians to receive the card and it was expected to cost up to $150 million. People who accept the cards are not restricted from participating in class-action lawsuits against Loblaws; any settlements received reduced by the gift card value, according to the 2024 settlement.

Derek Nepinak was the lead plaintiff in a $1 billion class-action lawsuit on behalf of all Canadians who purchased bread from the named grocers since January 2001. As of January 2018, other lawsuits were planned by Strosberg Sasso Sutts LLP and Merchant Law Group LLP. The lawsuit also seeks for $100 million in punitive damages. Loblaws and George Weston Limited agreed to pay $500 million to settle this lawsuit in July 2024, while the class action lawsuit against Canada Bread, Sobeys, Metro, Walmart Canada and Giant Tiger remains ongoing.

A senior law officer for the Competition Bureau wrote in the ITO documents that the last documented price increase occurred in December 2015, or a year and a half after the Grupo Bimbo takeover, and he believes the "conduct is ongoing."

In June 2023, Canada Bread pleaded guilty to four counts of price fixing and was fined $50 million. According to the Competition Bureau, the fine was the highest ever price fixing fine in Canadian history. As a result of the guilty plea, Canada Bread is placed on federal government's list of "ineligible and suspended suppliers" and banned from bidding on any federal government contracts for 10 years. The ban will last until August 22, 2033.

In November 2024, Maple Leaf Foods launched a defamation lawsuit against Canada Bread after Canada Bread accused Maple Leaf Foods of using Canada Bread as a shield to avoid liability from the price-fixing scandal. Maple Leaf Foods claimed that Canada Bread and Grupo Bimbo tried to shift the blame onto Maple Leaf Foods for Canada Bread's mismanagement after it was acquired by Grupo Bimbo.
