= The N Word: One Man's Stand =

Book by Stephen Hagan

- Author: Stephen Hagan
- Language: English
- Genre: Biography
- Publisher: Magabala Books
- Publication date: 2005
- Publication place: Australia
- Media type: Print
- Pages: 275
- ISBN: 978-1-875641-98-7
- OCLC: 60651773
- Dewey Decimal: 305.89915 22
- LC Class: DU123.3 .H34 A3 2005

The N Word: One Man's Stand is an autobiography by Aboriginal activist Stephen Hagan, and it is also an account of his fight to have the word "Nigger" removed from a sign at the Toowoomba sports oval.

"The E. S. 'Nigger' Brown Stand" was so named in 1960 to honour the rugby league player Edwin Stanley Brown (1898–1972) as a distinguished local sportsman. The government at the time, the Howard government, rejected a recommendation by the United Nations Committee on the Elimination of Racial Discrimination in Hagan v Australia to remove the sign. The book also gives an account of Hagan's own conflicts with Aboriginal power brokers, initially over his resistance to nepotism and lack of accountability and later in relation to the sign. He gives his account of an irregularly called "community meeting", the assistance he provided to Aboriginal people and groups that were not assisted by the publicly funded Aboriginal bodies. Also included is an account of his clash with the Aboriginal and Torres Strait Islander Commission's deputy chair Sugar Ray Robinson.
