= Fred Walker (entrepreneur) =

Australian businessman (1884–1935)

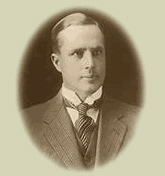
Fred Walker

Fred Walker (5 January 1884 – 21 July 1935) was an Australian businessman and founder of Fred Walker & Co. (two incarnations, the first in Hong Kong, the second in Melbourne) and the Fred Walker Company in Melbourne. He also set up Kraft Walker Cheese Co. in partnership with American businessman James L. Kraft in 1926, in order to market Kraft's patented method of processing cheese.

Fred Walker & Co. is best known for creating Vegemite, a yeast extract-based food spread and Australian cultural icon. Kraft Walker Cheese Co. first manufactured a cheese known as Red Coon around 1931, which later became known as Coon cheese.

== Early life and education ==
Walker was born on 5 January 1884 in Hawthorn, a suburb of Melbourne, and won a scholarship to attend Caulfield Grammar School.

== Career ==
=== Early career and army service ===
He worked in the food import and export industry, first for J. Bartram & Sons. He went to China at the age of 19, when American goods were being boycotted there, and founded Fred Walker & Co. in Hong Kong in 1903, an import and export business.

In 1907 he returned to Melbourne, and served in the Australian Military Forces from 1908, first in the Australian Garrison Artillery and then the 13th Infantry Brigade. However, despite a promotion to captain 1916, he did not serve in the Australian Imperial Force "because of the importance of the production of foodstuffs".

He founded the Fred Walker Company at 54 William Street (moving to Flinders Street in 1911). This company specialised in canned foods, especially dairy products, exporting them to Asia. It manufactured Red Feather canned foods (including butter and cheese) from around 1910. He created Cresco Food Co. for his younger brother, which was the first factory to manufacture "flaked food" (dehydrated food?) products in Australia.

=== Post-WWI ===
==== Bonox and Vegemite ====
In 1918 the company started making Bonox, a beef extract product still produced today, at a new factory in North Fitzroy. The company grew to operate in Sydney, Adelaide and New Zealand in 1918–1919, and in 1920 acquired the former South Melbourne College in the suburb of Albert Park, to consolidate his manufacturing.

However, the post-war economic situation led to great financial losses, and Walker had a deficiency of £82,000 and liabilities totalling £200,000. With the cooperation of his creditors and the bank, he formed a new company, named Fred Walker & Co. (same as his earlier Hong Kong company), with himself as managing director, and two other directors representing his creditors.

In 1923, Walker hired chemist Cyril P. Callister to develop a yeast extract product to compete with the English product Marmite. Vegemite was created, and first sold in 1923 after Walker's daughter Sheilah selected the winning entry from a public competition to name the product. After poor sales performance, Walker changed the product's name to Parwill (a joking reference to Marmite: "Ma might, but Pa will") before returning to Vegemite. (In 1935, customers were given a free jar of Vegemite with every Fred Walker & Co. product purchased, and the popularity of the spread grew steadily after this promotion. The success of the product was assured during the Second World War when Vegemite, due to its high vitamin B content, was chosen to be included in Australian soldier ration packs and the English product Marmite was pulled from the market. Vegemite became an Australian cultural icon.)

==== Cheese and Kraft ====
Walker learnt of Chicago businessman James L. Kraft's method of halting the maturation of cheese by processing it in a certain way, which he had patented in the US in 1916, so he went to the United States to meet him and acquire the Australian rights to use this method. Callister was once again instrumental in developing the product, using Kraft's patent to create a cheese which was used to help persuade Kraft to grant the necessary licence for its manufacture under the Kraft name in Australia. He began a partnership with Kraft to manufacture this "processed cheese" in 1925, and in May 1926 the Kraft Walker Cheese Co. was registered, a separate company from Fred Walker & Co. but managed by the same staff, and the parent company of Kraft Foods Ltd. Walker was chairman by 1930. Kraft Walker began to make processed "Kraft Cheddar Cheese"at their South Melbourne plant in Maffra Street. At first, it processed cheese from other factories at a different plant, but owing to problems in obtaining supply, in November 1934 Kraft-Walker leased the factory owned by Warrnambool Cheese and Butter at Allansford, and soon expanded it.

Callister, appointed as chief chemist and production superintendent, engaged scientific staff and set up a laboratory for the cheese-making process. This included the appointment of a bacteriologist in 1927, for possibly the first time in Australia.

March 1930 saw the end of protracted litigation, after Kraft Walker had earlier sued Oliver Kennett McAnulty, owner of Maxam Cheese Company in Brisbane, for an alleged infringement of a patent for the treatment of cheddar cheese. While the first judge had ruled in favour of Kraft Walker, his judgment was overturned on appeal by the full court of the Supreme Court of Brisbane.

Kraft Walker began manufacturing "Red Coon" (later COON) cheese around July 1931.

=== Employee welfare ===
Walker was successful at attracting staff by offering workers a social club, allowing for morning tea breaks from manufacturing, providing first aid and canteen facilities, and modern work systems that increased employee productivity.

== Family, later life and death ==
Walker married Mabel Ashton Perrin in 1913 and they had one daughter, Sheilah.

Walker was a Freemason. He was initiated at Austral Temple Lodge No. 110 on 9 July 1919.

In later life he served as the president of the Melbourne Rotary Club (1933–34), and he was also a director of the local YMCA. He died of heart disease on 21 July 1935.

== Kraft-Walker after Walker ==
Following Walker's death, Kraft Foods Inc. bought the majority part of both Kraft Walker Cheese Co. Pty Ltd and Fred Walker & Co., amalgamating them to form the Kraft Walker Cheese Co. Ltd, with the American company holding the majority share. Callister had become a director of the company in 1935, not long before Walker's death, and he continued to increase the numbers of laboratory staff, as well as closely supervising quality control and continuing to work on methods of processing food, in particular processed cheese and the use of Vitamin B1 (thiamine) in foods. Rations, including dehydrated food, were produced for the Australian and United States armies

Kraft Walker Cheese Co. opened a vegetable dehydration factory at Port Melbourne in 1943, which became the most well-known Kraft factory in the state. In 1950 the company became Kraft Foods Ltd. and built a new plant at Fishermans Bend, where it remained into the 21st century.

In November 1951, a new Kraft-Walker factory, primarily for the manufacture of processed cheese, was opened in Northgate, Brisbane. The buildings included offices, a sales and warehouse block, including a cool store for Red Coon cheese, which was made at Quinalow in Queensland.

Kraft Foods Inc. later split into Mondelez International Inc and Kraft Foods Group, with the latter undergoing a merger with Heinz to become Kraft Heinz in March, 2015.

The company was registered in Australia for a few months in early 2000 as Kraft Foods Ltd, then as Kraft Foods Limited from 29 May 2000 to 27 June 2013, and since then (as of January 2021) as Mondelez Australia (Foods) Ltd.

== See also ==
- List of Caulfield Grammar School people
