= Bonox =

Australian beef extract

- Product type: Meat extract
- Current owner: Bega Cheese (2017–)
- Country: Australia
- Introduced: 1919; 107 years ago
- Previous owners: Kraft Foods Inc. Mondelez International

Bonox is a beef extract made in Australia, currently owned by Bega Cheese after it acquired the brand from Mondelez International in 2017. It is primarily a drink but can also be used as stock in cooking.

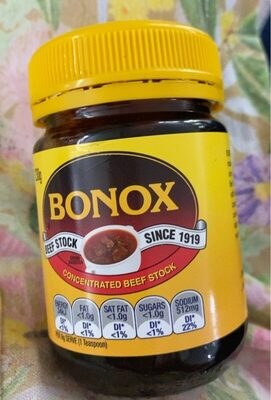

== History ==
Bonox was invented by Camron Thomas for Fred Walker of Fred Walker & Co. in 1918. Bonox was launched the following year.

The Walker company was purchased by Kraft Foods Inc. sometime after Walker's death in 1935. The product was produced by Kraft until 2012 when the company split into Kraft Foods Group for the North American Grocery Market and Mondelez International which retained everything else, including the Australian Grocery Business. Mondelez Continued producing bonox until 2017, when Bonox, along with other brands, was sold to Bega Cheese. It kept the same recipe and jar designs.

As of 2021, Bonox continues to be produced by Bega.

== Nutritional information ==
This concentrated beef extract contains iron and niacin. It is a thick dark brown liquid paste which can be added to soups or stews for flavoring and can also be added to hot water and served as a beverage.

=== Approximate per 100g ===
- Energy, including dietary fibre 401 kJ
- Moisture 56.6 g
- Protein 16.6 g
- Nitrogen 2.66 g
- Fat 0.2 g
- Ash 19.8 g
- Starch 6.5 g
- Available carbohydrate, without sugar alcohols 6.5 g
- Available carbohydrate, with sugar alcohols 6.5 g

=== Minerals ===
- Calcium (Ca) 110 mg
- Copper (Cu) 0.11 mg
- Fluoride (F) 190 ug
- Iron (Fe) 2 mg
- Magnesium (Mg) 60 mg
- Manganese (Mn) 0.13 mg
- Phosphorus (P) 360 mg
- Potassium (K) 690 mg
- Selenium (Se) 4 ug
- Sodium (Na) 6660 mg
- Sulphur (S) 160 mg
- Zinc (Zn) 1.5 mg

=== Vitamins ===
- Thiamin (B1) 0.36 mg
- Riboflavin (B2) 0.27 mg
- Niacin (B3) 5.4 mg
- Niacin Equivalents 8.17 mg
- Pantothenic acid (B5) 0.38 mg
- Pyridoxine (B6) 0.23 mg
- Biotin (B7) 12 ug

== See also ==
- Bovril
