= Edwin Brown =

Australian rugby league footballer

Personal information
- Full name: Edwin Stanley Brown
- Born: 1898 ?, Australia
- Died: 1972 (age 74) Toowoomba, Australia

Playing information
- Position: Centre
Club
Years	Team	Pld	T	G	FG	P
191?–2?	Newtown (Toowoomba)
Representative
Years	Team	Pld	T	G	FG	P
1919–25	Queensland
1921–22	Australia
19??–??	Toowoomba

Edwin Stanley "Nigger" Brown (1898–1972) was an Australian rugby league player who played in the 1910s and 1920s. A Queensland state and Australian international representative centre, he played club rugby in Toowoomba for Newtown.

During the 1920 Great Britain Lions tour Brown was selected to play for Toowoomba against the tourists, scoring a try. He was nicknamed "Nigger" because of his fair complexion (or perhaps because of his use of the "Nigger Brown" variety of Kiwi shoe polish), became Toowoomba's first rugby league international when he was selected to go on the 1921–22 Kangaroo tour of Great Britain, during which he played four matches.

Brown forged a world-class centre combination with Tom Gorman in the famous Toowoomba sides of the 1920s, and in 1925 injured his ankle playing in their win over the New Zealand national side before a crowd of around 5,000 in Toowoomba.

Brown later served as a judge for Sunday Herald's player of the season award. He was also president of the Toowoomba Rugby League during the early 1950s and became a local councillor in Toowoomba. He was Kangaroo Tour manager in 1954.

In the 1960s a grandstand in Toowoomba's main football stadium, the Toowoomba Sports Ground, was named the 'E S "Nigger" Brown Stand' in his honour. Brown died in 1972 aged 74.

The "E S 'Nigger' Brown Stand" later became the subject of a book, The N Word: One Man's Stand, by Stephen Hagan, who campaigned for its removal. When the stand was demolished in September 2008, the Toowoomba Sports Ground Inc decided not to use the nickname in future references to Brown.
