= May West =

Canadian dessert cake

A May West is a round dessert cake with creme filling. It was created in Canada, and continues to be particularly popular in the province of Quebec. It is currently made by Vachon Inc., a division of Canada Bread. It was originally called a "Mae West", after the eponymous movie star, but the spelling was changed in the 1980s.

The cake was invented by René Brousseau, pâtissier at Vaillancourt Inc., a Quebec City bakery. As of 1932, May West cakes were made by Stuart Ltd, run by the wealthy Montreal-based Allard family; they were bought out in 1979 by their longtime competitor, Vachon Inc. Vachon continued to market them under the Stuart brand, before retiring the Stuart brand and rebranding the line to reflect a consolidated Vachon lineup.

The original crème filling was custard, but was replaced by a shortening-based vanilla creme close in taste and texture to the filling found in Twinkies.
