= Vachon Bakery =

Canadian pastry company

- Type: Subsidiary
- Industry: Pastries
- Founded: 1923; 103 years ago
- Headquarters: Sainte-Marie-de-Beauce, Quebec, Canada
- Area served: Canada
- Owner: Grupo Bimbo
- Parent: Canada Bread
- Website: www.vachon.com

Vachon Bakery is a Canadian maker of popular snack pastries. The company was part of Saputo Inc. from 1999 to 2015. It has been owned by Canada Bread, part of Grupo Bimbo since 2015.

Vachon was founded by Joseph-Arcade and Rose-Anna Vachon Giroux in 1923 when the couple left their home village of Saint-Patrice-de-Beaurivage to develop a bakery in Sainte-Marie-de-Beauce in Quebec.

Brands include:

- May West
- Jos. Louis
- Billot Log Jelly Rolls
- Passion Flakie
- Ah Caramel!
- ½ Lune Moon
- Hostess (Canada only) - including Twinkies
