= Bimbo Canada =

Canadian baked goods producer

- Type: Subsidiary
- Industry: Bread
- Founded: 1911; 115 years ago
- Headquarters: Toronto, Ontario, Canada
- Area served: Canada
- Number of employees: 4,800
- Parent: Grupo Bimbo
- Subsidiaries: Vachon Bakery
- Website: bimbocanada.com

Bimbo Canada, formerly Canada Bread Company, Ltd. is a Canadian producer and distributor of packaged fresh bread and bakery products. The company operates 17 bakeries and employs over 4,800 employees across Canada.

Purchased by Grupo Bimbo (BIMBOA:Mexico) on May 23, 2014 for CAD$1.83 billion, Canada Bread is currently led by Alejandro Pintado, President, and operates as an independent business unit of the global baking company.

== History ==
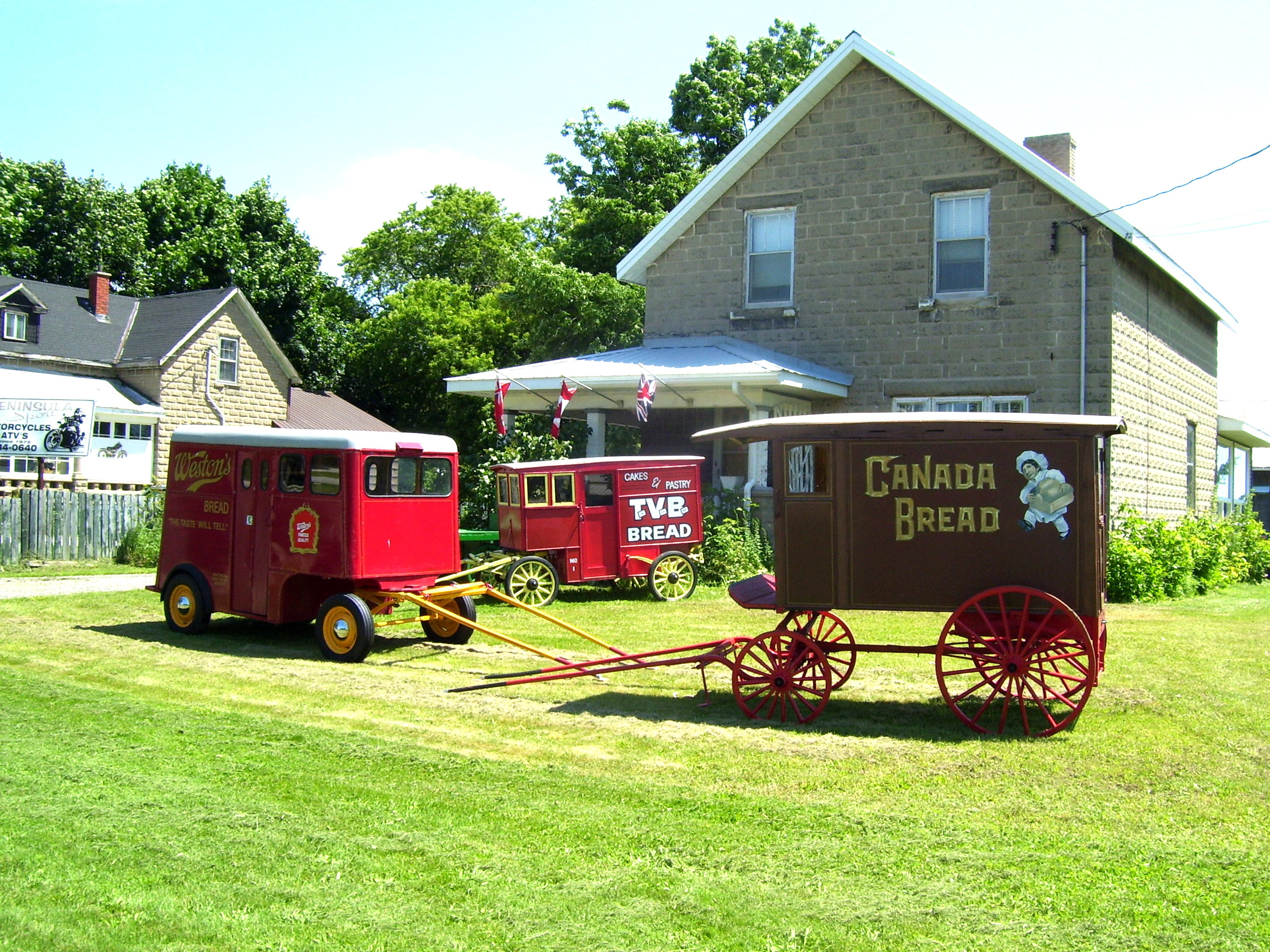
An early Canada Bread delivery wagon

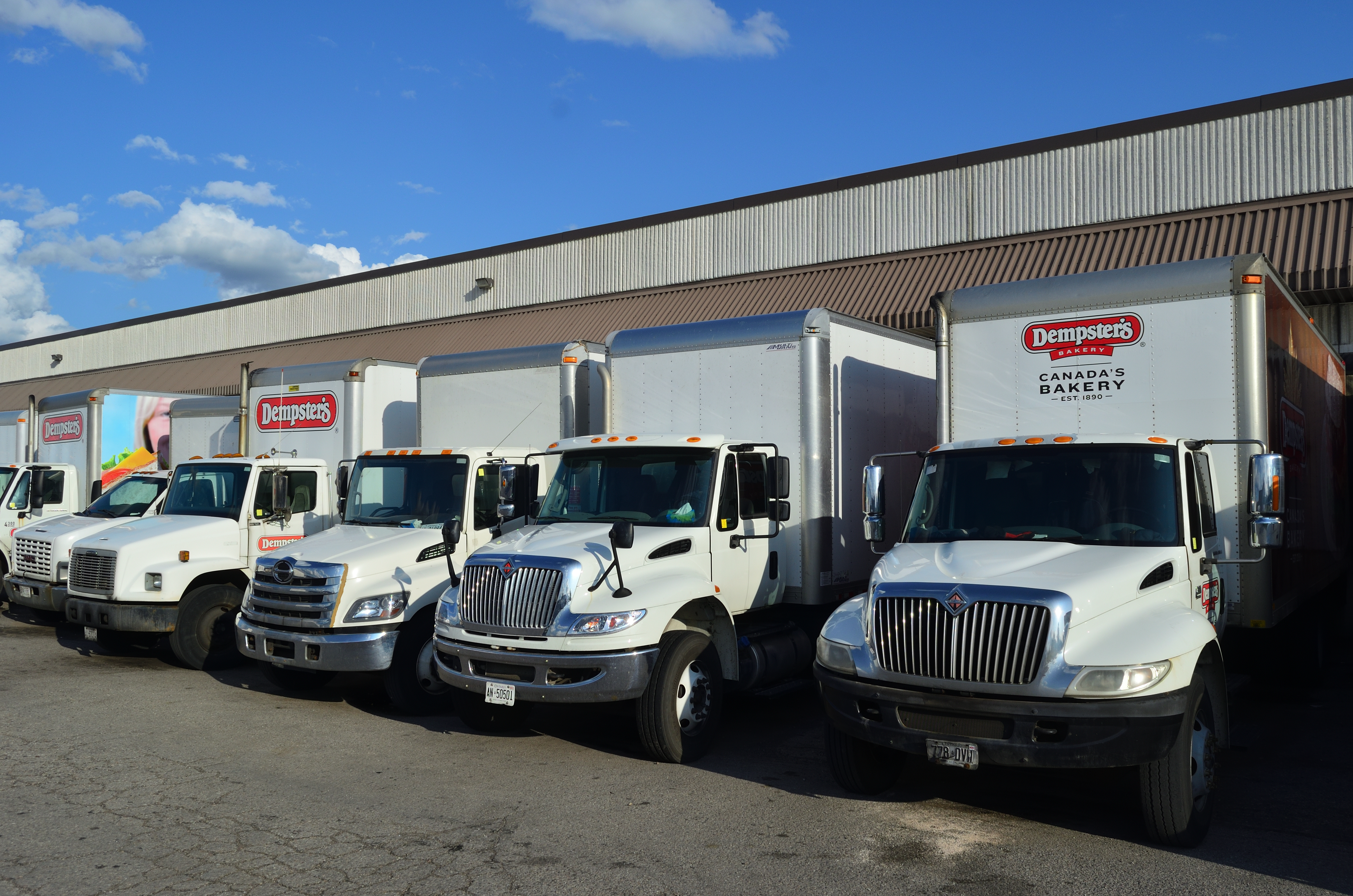
Dempster's Bread in Markham, Ontario

Canada Bread was founded in June 1911 following the merger of five of Canada's leading baking companies: Bredin Bread Company, Model Bakery (founded by George Weston), Toronto Bakery, Stuarts Limited and Boyd's Bakery. The founders of these acquired bakeries, their companies no longer theirs, agreed not to compete with Canada Bread, in bread for ten years. Weston and Stuart immediately formed new baking companies making biscuits and cakes. Weston Bakeries reentered the bread market in 1921, becoming over time a major competitor to Canada Bread.

Over a span of 30 years, the company quickly grew, purchasing over 20 bakeries in a dozen cities across the country and establishing new bakery locations in Kingston, Ontario, Cornwall, Ontario, Kirkland Lake, Ontario, Chatham, Ontario and Sudbury, Ontario. In 1968, the company acquired Dempster's Bread Limited, which had become the nation's best-selling brand of bread. It followed this acquisition in 1969 by changing the name of the company to Corporate Foods Limited, but later reverted to Canada Bread Company, Limited in 1997. Quebec-based Multi-Marques, with its brand POM, was acquired in 2001.

In May 2014, Canada Bread was purchased from Maple Leaf Foods by Mexican-based bakery organization, Grupo Bimbo. Less than a year later, in February 2015, Canada Bread acquired the bakery division of Saputo Inc., Vachon Bakery (which had purchased Stuart in 1979), for CAD$120 million. In March 2015, Canada Bread also acquired two former Sobeys bakeries located in Winnipeg, Manitoba and Calgary, Alberta in Western Canada.

In May 2016, Canada Bread announced it was closing its North Bay, Ontario location after nearly 50 years of operation in the city; to be divested across other Canada Bread locations.

The company was renamed Bimbo Canada in 2018.

In June 2023, Canada Bread pleaded guilty to four counts of price fixing with its grocery competitors to increase the price of bread products over a 16-year period and was fined $50 million. According to the Competition Bureau, the fine was the highest ever price-fixing fine in Canadian history.
