= Saputo Inc. =

Canadian dairy company

- Type: Public
- Traded as: TSX: SAP
- Industry: Food - Major Diversified
- Founded: September 1954
- Founder: Lino Saputo
- Headquarters: Montreal, Quebec, Canada
- Area served: Canada, United States, Argentina, Australia, United Kingdom
- Key people: Lino Saputo (founder); Lino A. Saputo (chair and CEO)
- Revenue: ▲ C$19.061 billion (FY2025)
- Net income: ▲ C$1.565 billion (FY2025)
- Number of employees: 19,400 (2025)
- Website: saputo.com

Saputo Inc. is a Canadian dairy company based in Montreal, Quebec, founded in 1954 by the Saputo family. It produces, markets, and distributes a wide array of dairy products, including cheese, fluid milk, extended shelf-life milk and cream products, cultured products and dairy ingredients and is one of the top ten dairy processors in the world.

The company has expanded predominantly through mergers and acquisitions. Its products are sold in over 60 countries worldwide. It operated in Wales and Germany from 2006 to 2013. It used to own the Canadian rights to Hostess Brands products.

== History ==
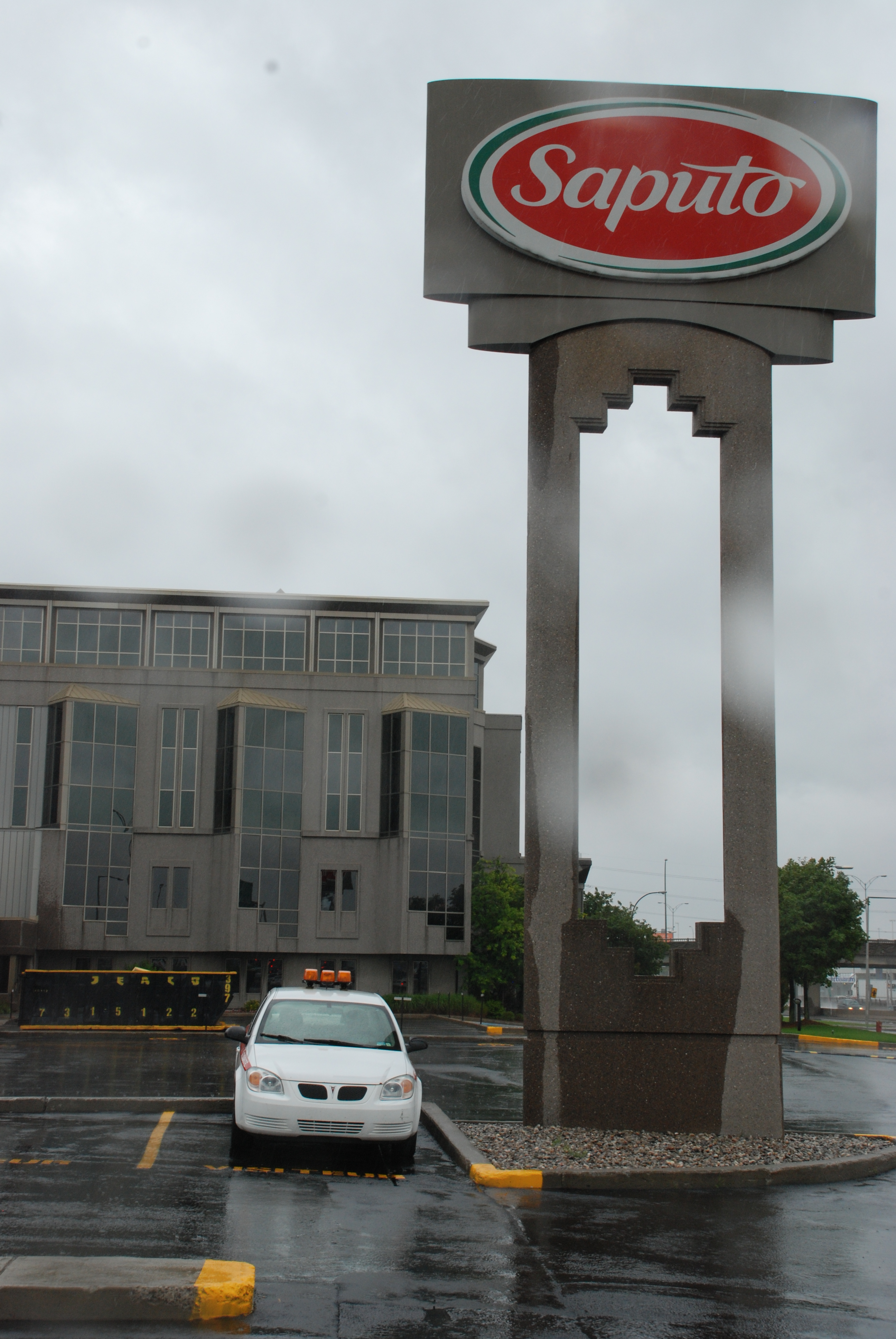
Saputo plant, Montreal

Master cheesemaker Giuseppe Saputo, his son Lino Saputo and family immigrated to Montreal from Montelepre, Italy, in the early 1950s. In September 1954, Lino convinced his father to start his own business. Using $500 to buy some basic equipment and a bicycle for deliveries, the Saputo family founded a cheesemaking company bearing its name. In 1957, Saputo's first sizable production facility was built in Montreal's Saint-Michel neighbourhood. Saputo went through considerable growth in the 1960s and 1970s as demand for its products increased. It became Canada's largest producer of mozzarella in the 1980s.

In 1988, Saputo expanded to the United States by acquiring two cheese plants. In the 1990s, the company made several acquisitions to diversify its product offering and geographic reach. In 1997, it became a publicly traded company and tripled in size following the acquisition of Stella Foods in the US.

In 2001, Saputo acquired Dairyworld Foods, the production and marketing arm of Agrifoods International Cooperative Ltd, which included the Dairyland milk and Armstrong cheese brands, for C$407 million.

In 2003, the firm continued to acquire businesses in the US and expanded into Argentina with the acquisition of Molfino Hermanos S.A. That same year, while remaining chairman of the board Lino Saputo stepped down as president and CEO and was succeeded in this role by his son, Lino A. Saputo. In 2008, Saputo acquired Neilson Dairy from George Weston Limited for C$465 million. The firm announced in 2012 it would buy Morningstar Food for US$1.45 billion. In January 2014, Saputo announced that they would be purchasing the fluid milk business of Scotsburn Co-operative Services Limited of Nova Scotia for $61 million. In February 2014, Saputo acquired a relevant interest of 87.920 percent of Victoria, Australia, dairy product firm Warrnambool Cheese & Butter Factory Company Holdings Limited shares. It acquired all the remaining shares in March 2017.

On February 3, 2015, Canada Bread Company Limited completed a C$120 million acquisition of Saputo Bakery, a division of Saputo Inc. Canada Bread Company Limited is a subsidiary of Mexico's Grupo Bimbo.

In September 2017, Saputo announced the complete acquisition of the Extended Shelf-Life Dairy Product Activities of Southeast Milk, Inc. in the United States. In November 2017, According to the reports, Saputo acquired Betin Inc. a Belmont specialty cheese maker with a facility that employs 319 workers.

On February 22, 2019, it was announced that Saputo would be buying British dairy company, Dairy Crest. The company was valued at C$1.7 billion (£975 million). The transaction was completed on April 15, 2019. These operations have been implicated in multiple pollution incidents.

== Defamation lawsuits ==
In March 2008, Saputo Inc. launched three defamation lawsuits against the owners of three Canadian newspapers over stories that were published in December 2007 alluding to Lino Saputo being linked to organized crime. Saputo sued CTVGlobemedia, the publisher of the Globe and Mail, Quebecor Inc., which owns the Sun Media Group of Papers, and Gesca Ltd, the owner of Montreal's La Presse newspaper. Company CEO Lino Saputo Jr. claimed the articles contained false allegations against Lino Saputo and Saputo Inc. An Italian weekly magazine, L'Espresso, was also being sued for articles that ran in November of the same year. Links between Lino Saputo and American mobster Joe Bonanno have been evidenced between 1964 and 1979.

== Main shareholders ==
As of July 15, 2025

Jolina Capital (Saputo family)	164,228,100	38.86%
Lino Saputo	6,500,000	1.54%
Cardinal Capital Management, Inc.	5,573,504	1.32%
Placements Italcan, Inc.	2,500,000	0.59%
Joey Saputo	2,484,931	0.59%
Franklin Bissett Investment Management	1,876,737	0.44%
ATB Investment Management, Inc.	1,227,130	0.29%
Mackenzie Investments Corp.	452,568	0.11%
Sjunde AP-fonden	368,512	0.09%
Storebrand Asset Management AS	244,061	0.06%

== Statistics ==
- Revenues: 19.06 billion CAD as of March 31, 2025
- Employees: 19,400 as of July 15, 2025
- Facilities: 59 (18 in Canada, 26 in the US, 9 international, and 6 in Europe) as of July 15, 2025

== Brands ==
Brands by Saputo include: Saputo, Alexis de Portneuf, Armstrong, Cathedral City, Cheer, Clover, Cracker Barrel (trademark used under licence), Dairyland, DairyStar, Devondale, Friendship Dairies, Frigo, Frigo Cheese Heads, Frylight, Joyya La Paulina, Milk2Go, Montchevre, Murray Goulburn Ingredients, Neilson, Nutrilait, Salemville, Scotsburn (trademark used under license), Sheese, South Cape, Stella, Sungold, Tasmanian Heritage, Treasure Cave, Woolwich Dairy and Yorkshire Wensleydale

== Divisions ==
- Dairy Division (Canada)
- Dairy Division (USA)
- Dairy Division (Argentina)
- Dairy Division (Australia)
- Dairy Division (UK)

== See also ==
- List of dairy product companies in the United States
