= Montelepre =

Montelepre Muncilebbri (Sicilian)
- Comune
- Comune di Montelepre
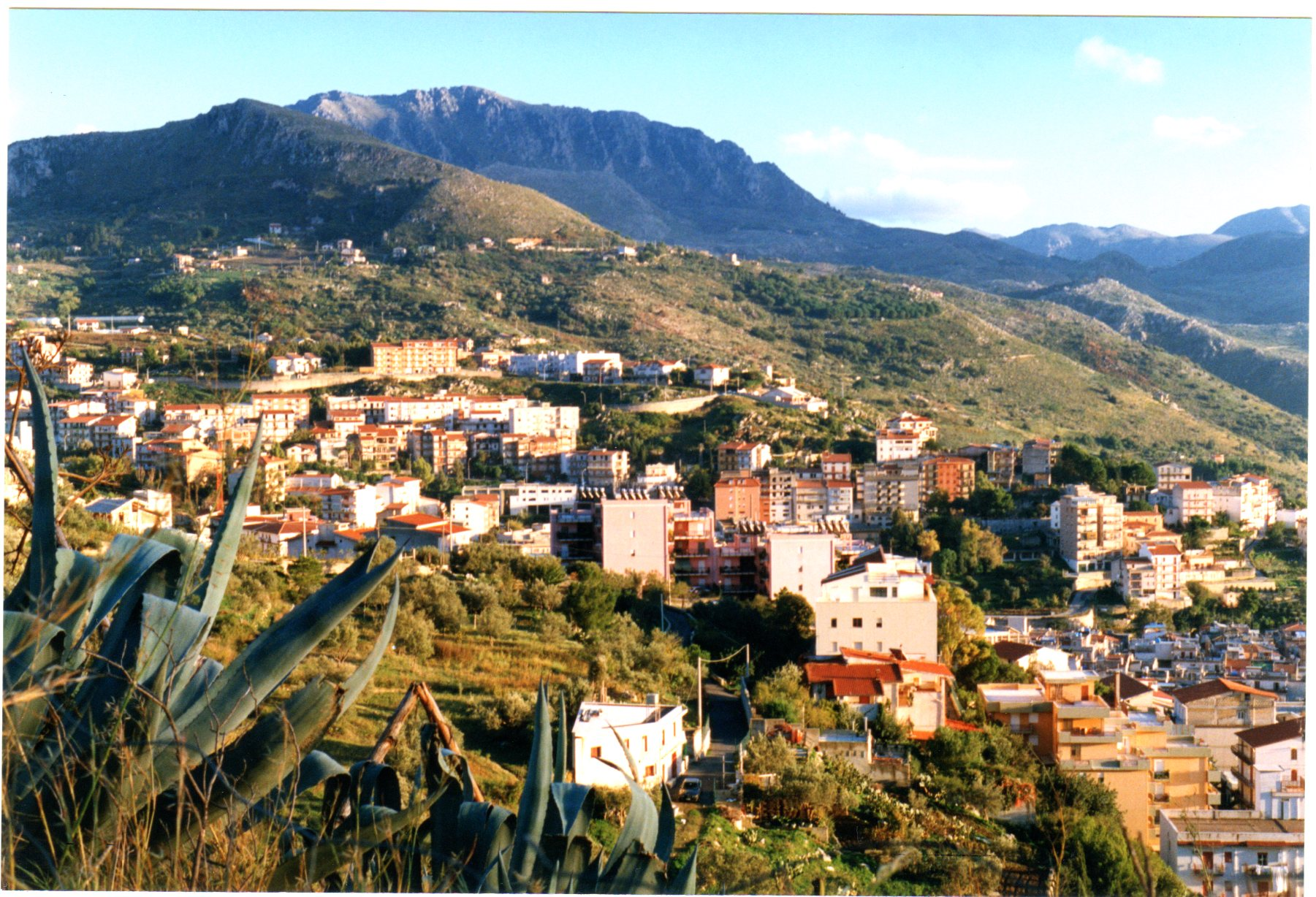

- Coat of arms

- Location within Italy Location within Sicily
- Coordinates: 38°06′N 13°10′E
- Country: Italy
- Region: Sicily
- Metropolitan city: Palermo (PA)

Government
  - Mayor: Giuseppe Terranova

Area
  - Total: 9 km^{2} (3.5 sq mi)
- Elevation: 342 m (1,122 ft)

Population (December 31, 2004)
  - Total: 6,202
  - Density: 690/km^{2} (1,800/sq mi)
- Demonym: Monteleprini
- Time zone: UTC+1 (CET)
  - Summer (DST): UTC+2 (CEST)
- Postal code: 90040
- Dialing code: 091
- Patron saint: SS. Crucifix
- Saint day: June 13

Montelepre (Italian pronunciation: [monteˈleːpre]; Sicilian: Muncilebbri) is a town and comune in the Metropolitan City of Palermo, Sicily, Italy. It is known for having been the native city of Sicilian bandit Salvatore Giuliano, of architect Rosario Candela, as well as the ancestral homeland of the American singer, actor, and congressman Sonny Bono, whose father Santo Bono was born in the town.

== Main sights ==
- The Church of Maria Santissima del Rosario
