= Warrnambool Cheese and Butter =

Australian dairy company

- Founded: 1888
- Headquarters: Australia
- Website: www.wcbf.com.au

Warrnambool Cheese & Butter Factory Company Holdings Limited (WCB) is an Australian-based company manufacturing dairy products, majority-owned by Saputo Inc., a Canadian company, that manufactures a range of dairy products under various brands. The business is based in Allansford, Victoria and is the oldest dairy processor in Australia, having been established in 1888. It owns cheese brands CHEER (formerly COON cheese) and Cracker Barrel.

== History ==
=== Early history ===
The company was registered on 28 May 1888 and the construction of factory facilities followed. In fact, two co-operative companies opened cheese and butter factories in Victoria in 1888; the first to open, on 22 October, was the Cobden and District Cheese and Butter Factory Company Ltd, and then on 14 November the Warrnambool Cheese & Butter Factory Co. Ltd. opened their factory in Allansford. At the start, the main product was cream, which was taken to Melbourne by rail.

Initially, Warrnambool Cheese & Butter sourced their milk from local farmers, and in 1889 all suppliers became shareholders. Butter production expanded during the 1890s, and by 1900, Victoria had 304 butter factories.

=== Kraft Walker takes over (1934) ===
In November 1934 Kraft Walker Cheese Co. leased the factory owned by Warrnambool Cheese & Butter and expanded operations. Kraft Walker began manufacturing "Red Coon" (later to be renamed COON) cheese, around July 1931.

=== Takeover of Lion Dairy & Drinks (2015) ===
In 2015, WCB paid A$137.5 million for a part of Lion Dairy & Drinks' business, including the cheese brands Cracker Barrel and COON.

== Current business ==
As of 2015 the company produces cheese, butter, cream and dairy ingredients, roughly half of which is sold overseas. Local brands include the Sungold milk, Coon cheese, Cracker Barrel, Mil Lel, Great Ocean Road and Warrnambool Cheddar cheeses. It is also one of the two Australian producers making nutraceutical products from milk extracts, including bone supplements and baby formula.

They also own and run the tourist attraction called Cheese World, close to the factory, which includes a dairy farm museum and an opportunity to sample cheeses, as well as a shop and cafe.

== See also ==
- Dairy farming in Australia
- List of cheesemakers
- List of oldest companies in Australia
