= Allansford =

- Suburb
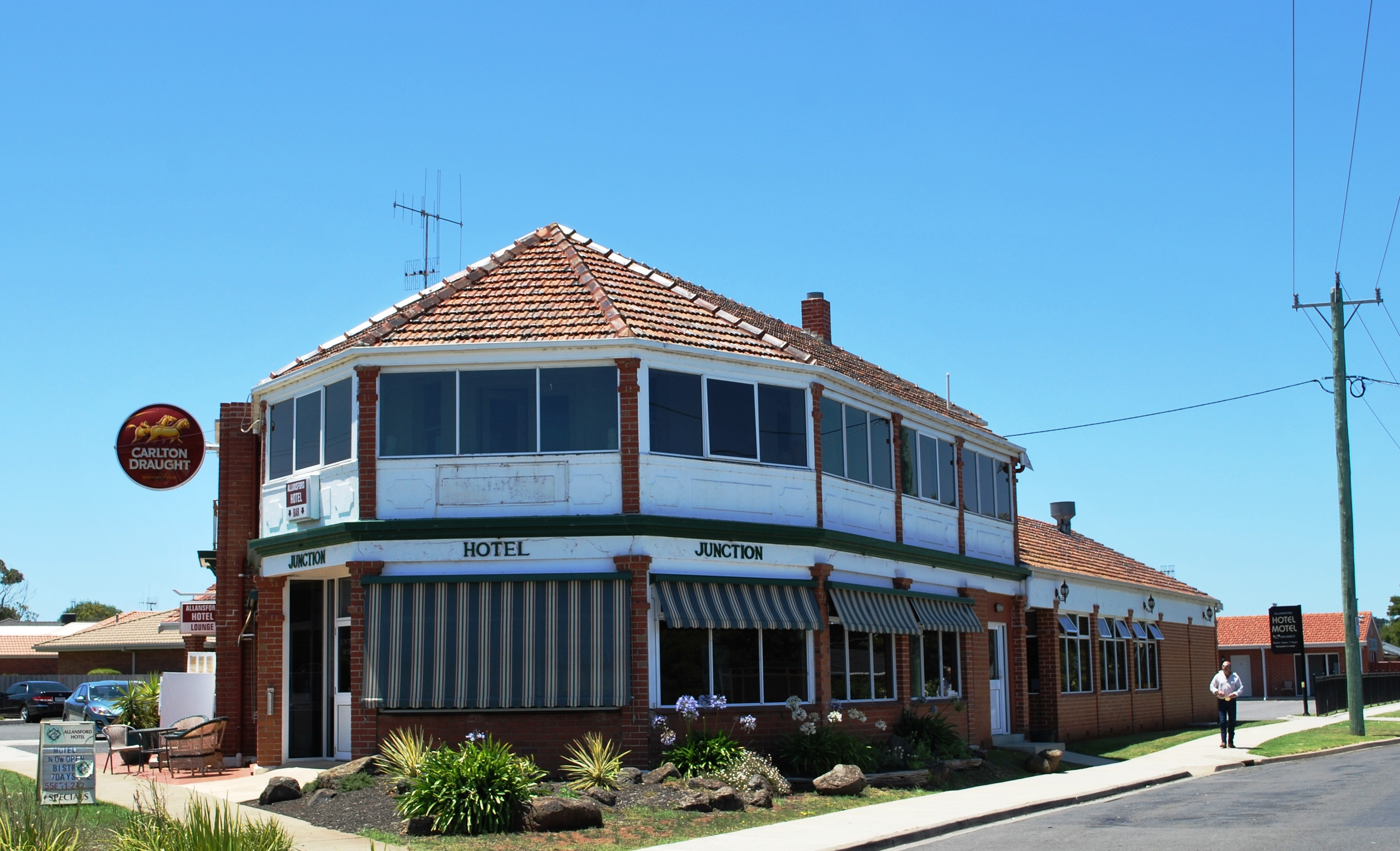
- Junction Hotel at Allansford

- Interactive map of Allansford
- Coordinates: 38°23′10″S 142°35′35″E
- Country: Australia
- State: Victoria
- City: Warrnambool
- LGA: City of Warrnambool
- Location: 252 km (157 mi) SW of Melbourne; 10 km (6.2 mi) E of Warrnambool

Government
  - State electorate: South-West Coast
  - Federal division: Wannon

Population
  - Total: 1,410 (2021 census)
- Postcode: 3277

Allansford is a town in the Western District of Victoria, Australia. It is in the City of Warrnambool local government area. The Hopkins River flows through the town.

Warrnambool Cheese and Butter is based in Allansford.

== History ==
The Post Office opened on 1 January 1860

The railway through the town was opened in 1890, and the town was once served by a local railway station.

== Today ==
A business park for Warrnambool is planned for the area.

The town has an Australian Rules football team (the Cats) competing in the Warrnambool & District Football League.

Allansford also hosts the final of the Sungold Cup. Which is a T20 competition consisted of they nearby leagues best teams.

== Population ==
At the 2021 census, Allansford had a population of 1,410. 87.6% of people were born in Australia and 92.6% of people only spoke English at home. The most common responses for religion were No Religion 46.5% and Catholic 23.1%.
