= Takakau =

Type of unleavened bread from New Zealand

- Alternative names: Pinwheel bread, Māori bread, Parāoa koroua, Pakipaki, Pāpākiri
- Type: Unleavened bread
- Place of origin: New Zealand
- Associated cuisine: Māori cuisine
- Main ingredients: Flour, Water, Salt

Takakau, otherwise known as Pinwheel bread or Māori bread is a type of unleavened bread produced by the Māori people of New Zealand. It is made from mixing flour, water and salt together and kneaded, then cooked either directly on hot ashes or in a camp oven.

== Background ==
Before Europeans found New Zealand, Māori traditionally made a type of bread from the root of Bracken fern. The roots were dug up, cleaned and roasted on hot embers, then beaten with a patu to soften the fibrous roots and washed in a basin filled with water to separate the starch from the roots. The decanted starch is molded into cakes and cooked on an open fire. These cakes, called Komeke had a bland taste, so they were often flavoured with animal fat, flower nectar and the juice of berries.

Māori readily adopted flour when wheat was introduced by early Europeans.

== See also ==
- Ash cake
- Bannock (British and Irish food)
- Bannock (Indigenous American food)
- Bread in culture
- Damper (food)
- Rēwena bread
- Tortilla de rescoldo
