= Damper (food) =

Australian campfire bread

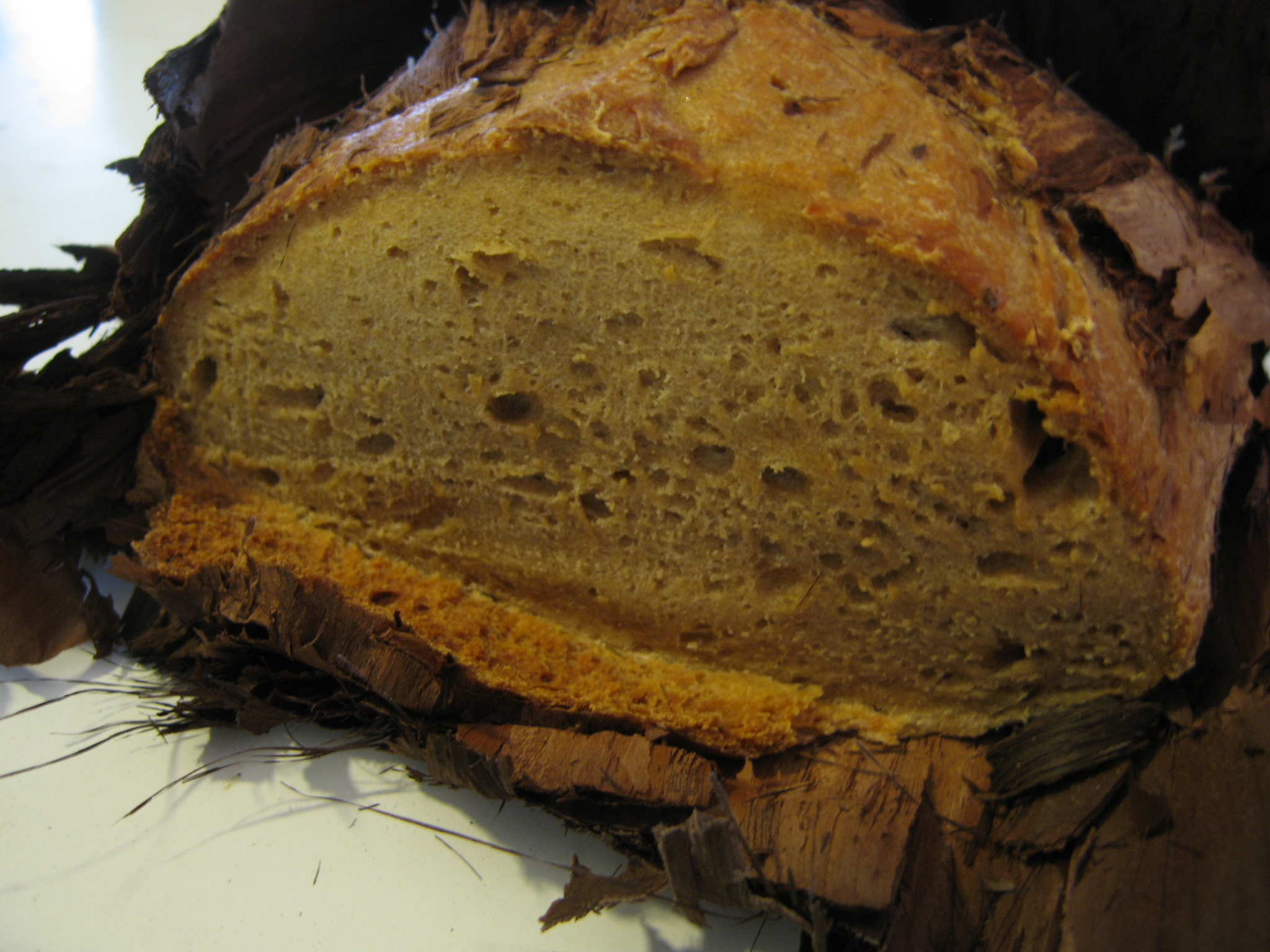
- A modern damper
- Type: Unleavened bread (traditionally)
- Place of origin: Australia
- Created by: Stockmen
- Main ingredients: Wheat flour, salt, water

Damper is a thick home-made bread traditionally prepared by early European settlers in Australia. It is a bread made from wheat-based dough. Flour, salt and water, with some butter if available, is kneaded and baked in the coals of a campfire, either directly or within a camp oven.

== Etymology ==
The word "damper" originated as a specific use of the British word "damper", meaning "something that takes the edge off the appetite". There was likely also some influence from the phrase "damp down" as in "to damp down a fire".

When cooked as smaller, individually-sized portions, the damper may be known as "bush scones" or "johnnycakes" (also "johnny cakes"). North American cornmeal bread is also called johnnycake; it is uncertain if this influenced the Australian term. However, Australian johnnycakes, while often pan-fried, remain wheat-based.

== Description ==
Damper was eaten by stockmen who travelled in remote areas for long periods, with only basic rations of flour (much less bulky than baked bread), sugar and tea, supplemented by whatever meat was available. It was also a basic provision of squatters. Damper is generally held to be unleavened and made without added rising agents, but historically, if the bread dough was left overnight, it could sometimes have leavened naturally, and this may have been a commonly understood technique in bush lore. Some recipes added portions of the previous night's dough, similar to a sourdough starter. Damper was normally cooked in the ashes of the campfire. Damper could also be cooked in a greased camp oven. Damper was eaten with dried or cooked meat or golden syrup.

Damper is considered quintessentially Australian, and emblematic of early European settlement and rural life there, although this way to make bread was not unique to colonial or pre-colonial Australia. Other cultures have similar hearth breads, and versions of soda or other quick breads are made when camping in many parts of the world, including New Zealand and the United Kingdom.

The bread is different from bush bread, which has been eaten by Indigenous Australians for thousands of years, traditionally made by crushing a variety of native seeds, nuts and roots, and mixing them into a dough baked in the coals of a fire. There are studies into whether this technique of various Aboriginal peoples influenced the development of colonial-era damper, similarly cooked in the ashes of a camp fire.

== See also ==
- Ash cake
- Bannock (Indigenous American food)
- Bread in culture
- Bush tucker
- History of bread
- Takakau
- Tortilla de rescoldo
