= Unleavened =

Unleavened may refer to:

- Unleavened bread
- Unleavened, made without a leavening agent
