= Caribou stew =

Canadian dish

Caribou stew is a traditional Inuit and Tłı̨chǫ dish originating from Northern Canada, particularly from Nunavut and the Northwest Territories.

== Ingredients ==
A traditional Nunavut caribou stew contains caribou cubes, onions, celery, potatoes, carrots, turnips, and seasonings, including bay leaves and thyme. Bannock is usually served as a side dish with the stew.

Some versions include rosemary, garlic, tomato paste, or red wine.
