= Laraquete =

Chilean town in Arauco, Arauco Province

Coordinates: 37°10′S 73°11′W

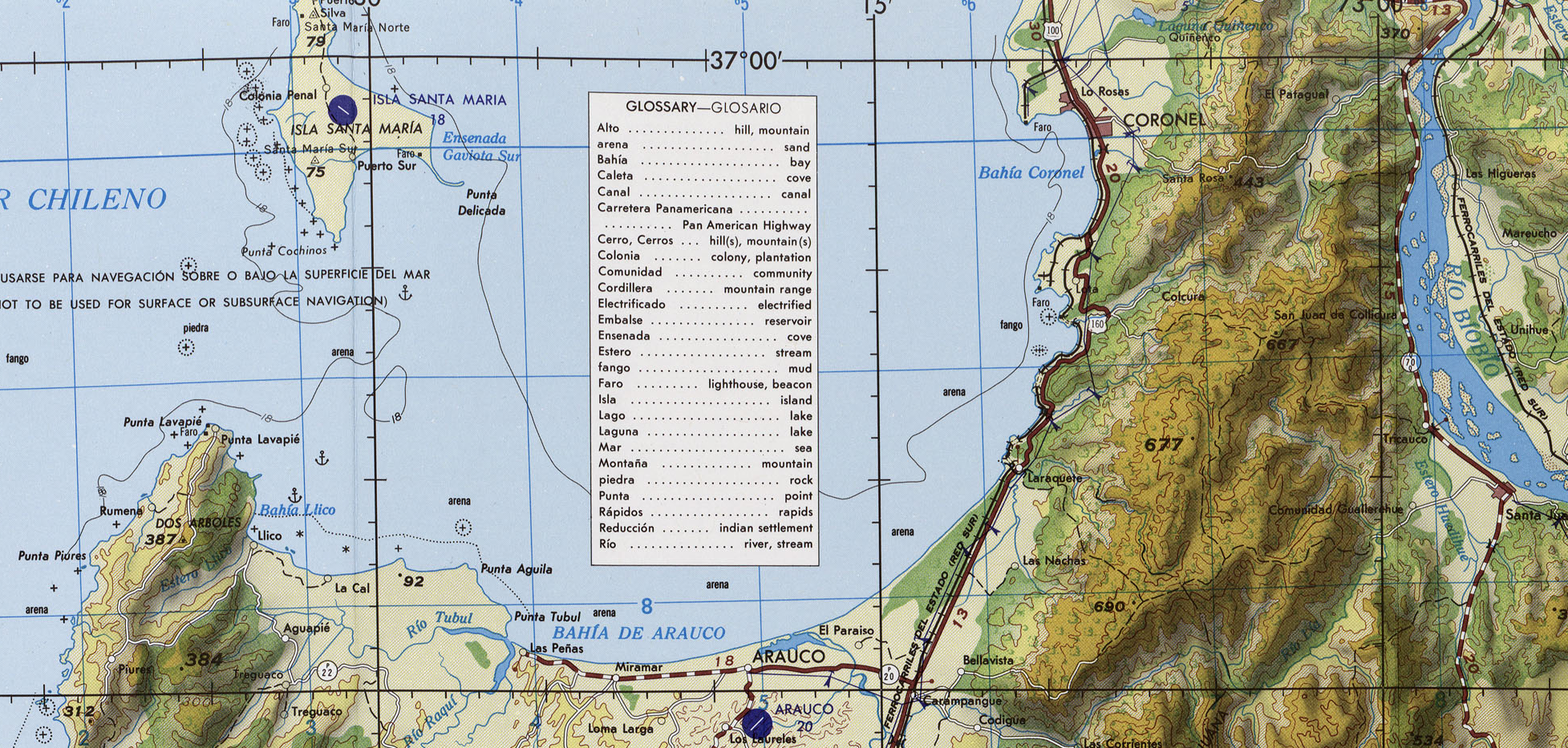
Bay of Arauco, on the right side, the commune of Lota

Laraquete is a Chilean town in Arauco, Arauco Province, Biobío Region. It is located at the mouth of the Laraquete River about 50 kilometres (31 mi) south of the Chilean city of Concepción. It has a population of 5,000.

The name "Laraquete" is Mapudungun for "big chin." The town is known for its variation on a Chilean specialty dish, tortilla de rescoldo, that is served by the "tortilleras" with chuchitas, a local shellfish.

== See also ==
- List of towns in Chile
