= Bannock (British and Irish food) =

Type of flat bread

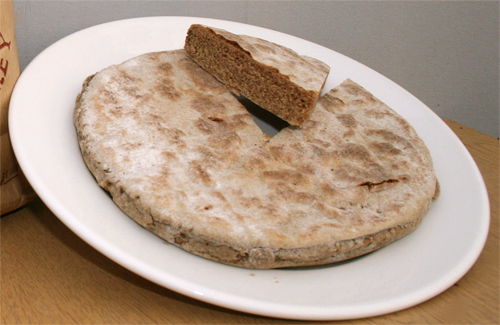
- Traditional beremeal bannock, as made in Orkney, Scotland
- Type: Flatbread
- Place of origin: British Isles

A bannock is a variety of flatbread (classed as quick bread in North America) cooked from flour, typically round, which is common in Scotland and other areas in Britain and Ireland, as well as variants among indigenous peoples in North America. They are usually cut into sections before serving.

== Etymology ==
The word bannock comes from northern English and Scots dialects. The Oxford English Dictionary states the term stems from panicium, a Latin word for "baked dough", or from panis, meaning bread. It was first referred to as "bannuc" in early glosses to the 8th-century author Aldhelm (d. 709), with its first cited definition dating to 1562. Its historic use was primarily in Ireland, Scotland and Northern England. The Scottish poet Robert Burns mentions a bannock in his Epistle to James Tennant of Glenconner, in reference to Alexander Tennant.

== Early history ==
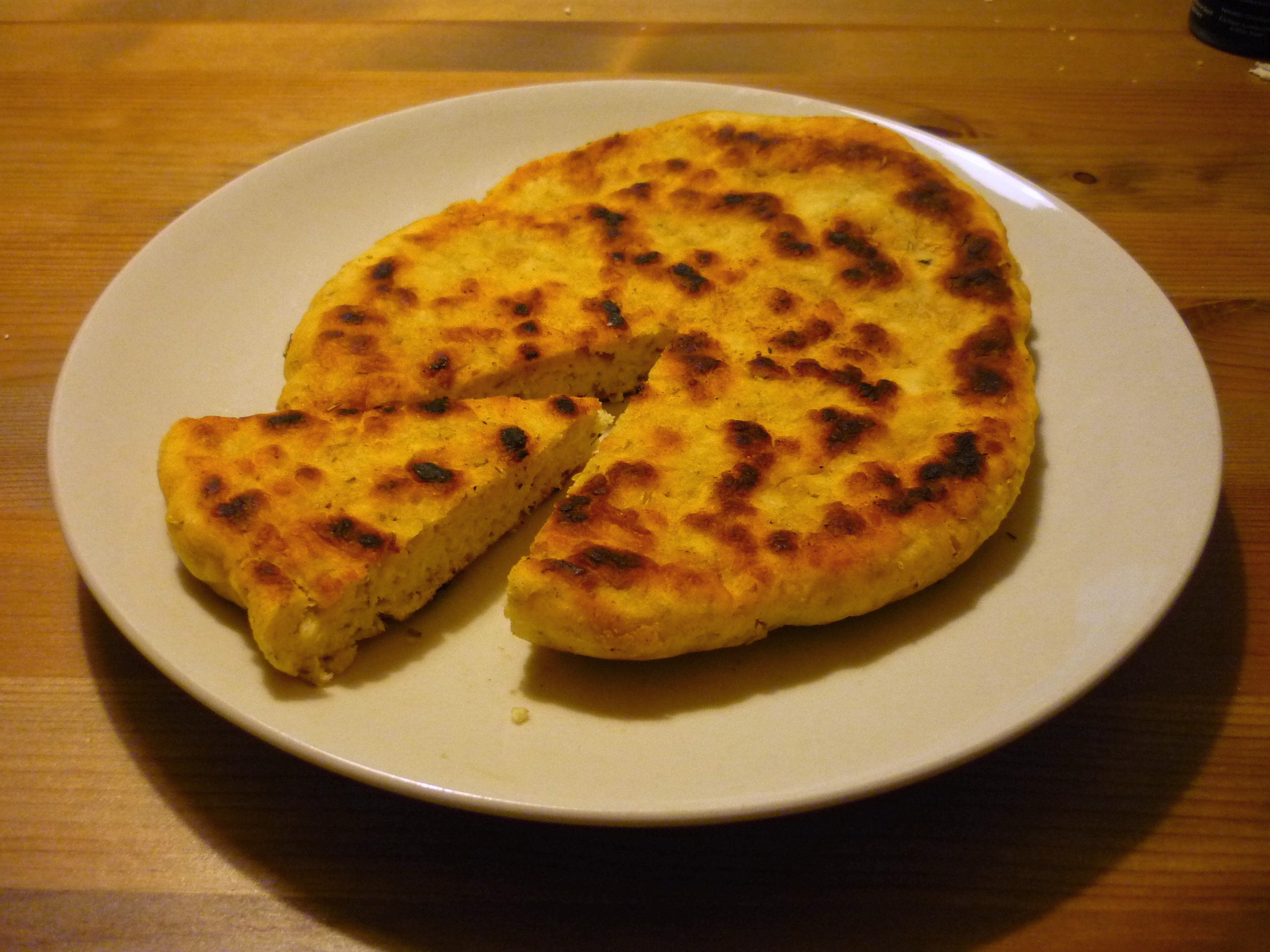
Bannock

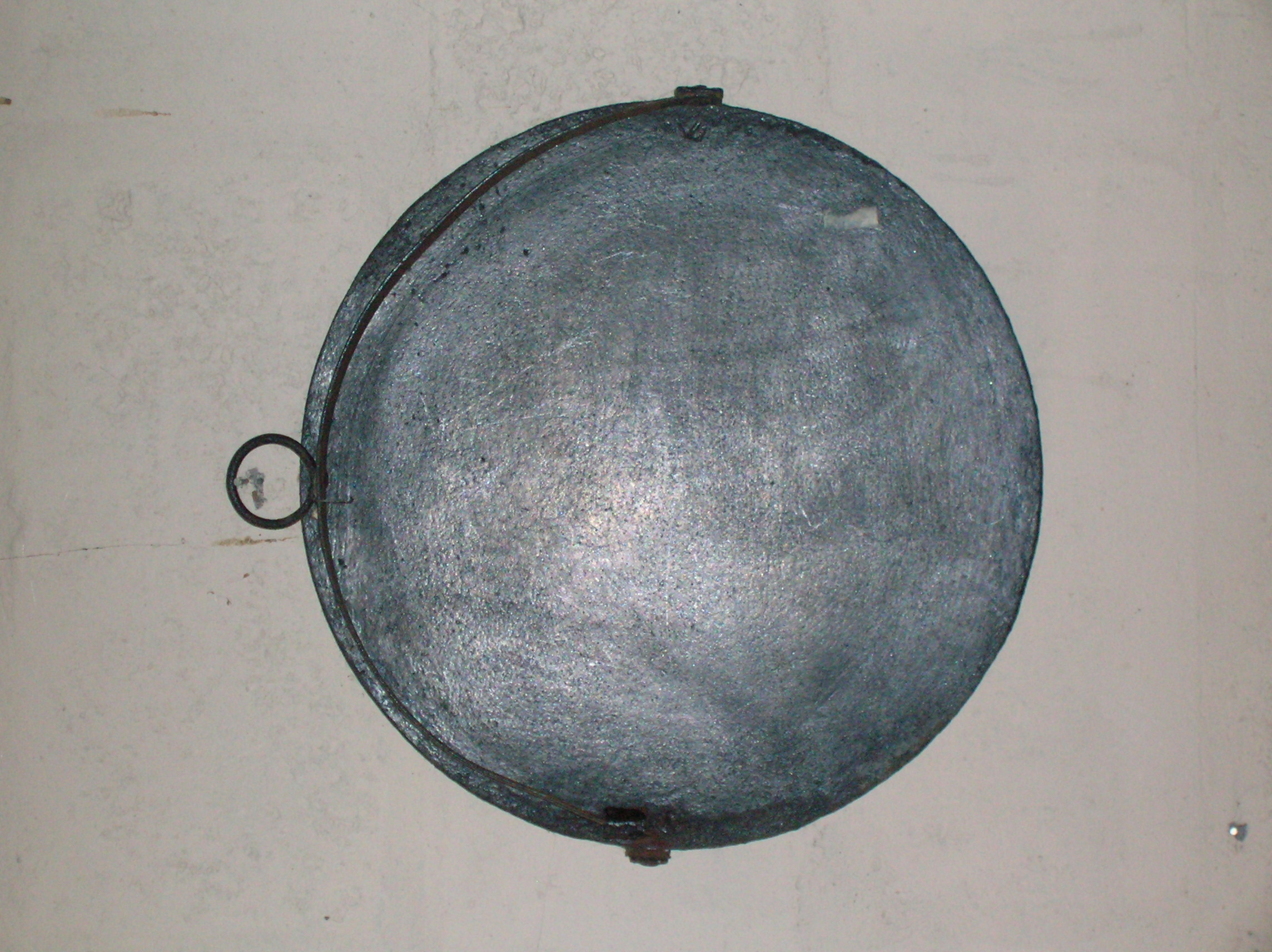
A griddle (girdle) from Dalgarven Mill in North Ayrshire, used for baking bannocks and oat cakes

The original bannocks were heavy, flat cakes of unleavened barley or oatmeal dough formed into a round or oval shape, then cooked on a griddle (or girdle in Scots). In Scotland, before the 19th century, bannocks were cooked on a bannock stane (Scots for stone), a large, flat, rounded piece of sandstone, placed directly onto a fire, used as a cooking surface. Most modern bannocks are made with baking powder or baking soda as a leavening agent, giving them a light and airy texture.

== Varieties ==
Bannock varieties can be named or differentiated according to various characteristics: the flour or meal from which they are made, whether they are leavened or not, whether they have certain special ingredients, how they are baked or cooked, and the names of rituals or festivals in which they are used. Historically, specially made bannocks were used in rituals marking the changing of the Gaelic seasons: St Bride's bannock for spring (1 February), Bealtaine bannock for summer (1 May), Lughnasadh or Lammas bannock for autumn harvests (1 August) and Samhain bannock for winter (end of October). Other special bannocks include:

- beremeal bannock,
- bride's bannock,
- cod liver bannock,
- cryin' bannock,
- fallaid bannock,
- fife bannock,
- Hogmanay bannock,
- Marymas bannock,
- mashlum bannock,
- Michaelmas bannock,
- pease bannock,
- Pitcaithly bannock (a kind of shortbread flavored with almonds and citrus peel),
- salt bannock,
- sautie bannock,
- silverweed bannock,
- St Columba's bannock,
- teething bannock,
- Yetholm bannock, and
- Yule bannock.

Manx bonnag probably comes from the same root form as bannock and is made using similar ingredients. In the north of England, bannocks are often made using pastry rather than a bread dough.

=== Selkirk bannock ===
Selkirk bannock
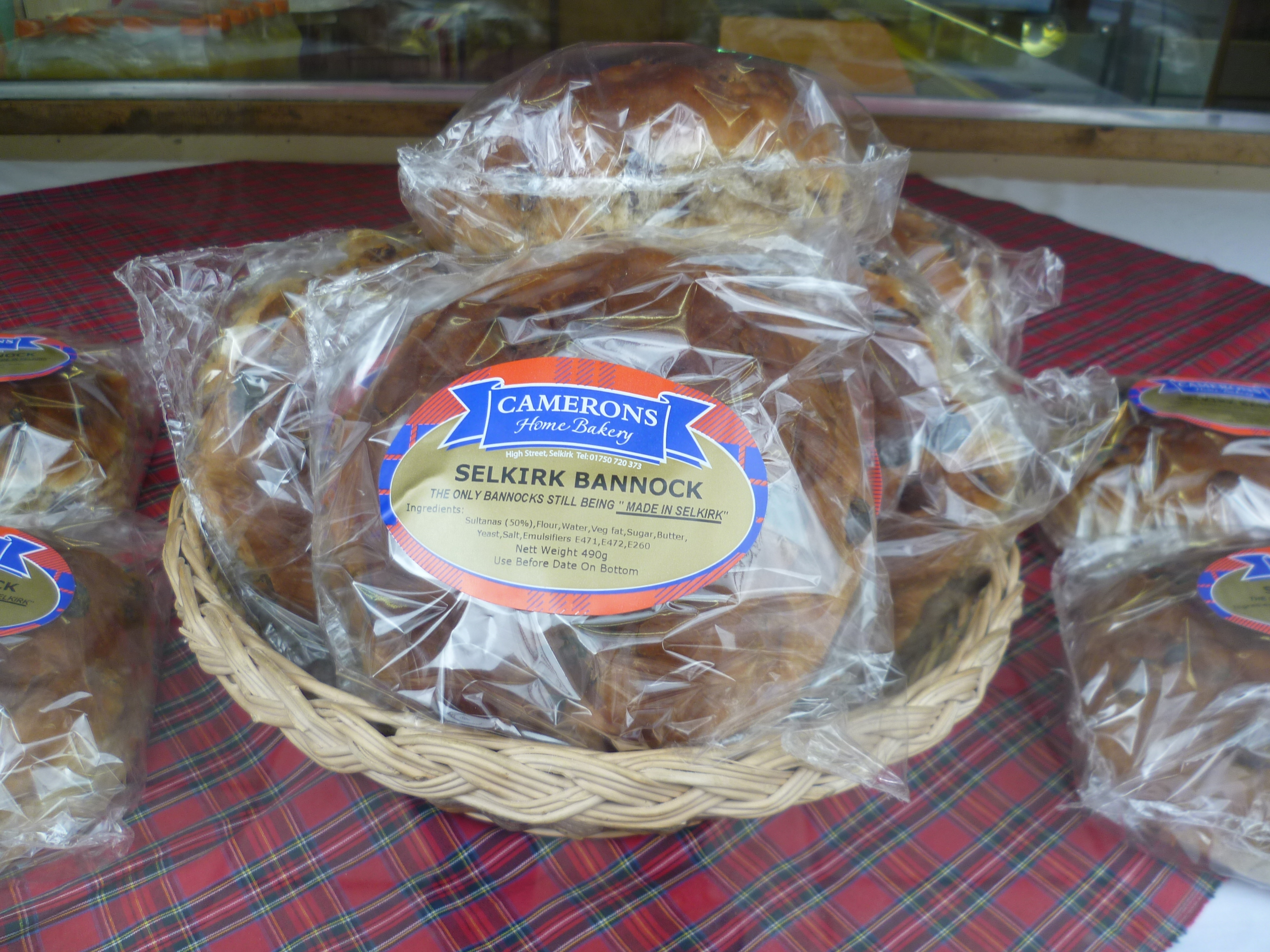
- Type: Bread
- Place of origin: Scotland
- Region or state: Selkirkshire
- Created by: Robbie Douglas
- Invented: 1859
- Main ingredients: Wheat flour, raisins

A Scottish variant, the Selkirk bannock, is a spongy, buttery version, sometimes compared to a fruitcake, made from wheat flour and containing a very large quantity of raisins. It takes its name from the town in the Scottish Borders where it is traditionally made. The first known maker of this variety was a baker named Robbie Douglas, who opened his shop in Selkirk in 1859. When Queen Victoria visited Sir Walter Scott's granddaughter at Abbotsford, she is reputed to have taken her tea with a slice of Selkirk bannock.

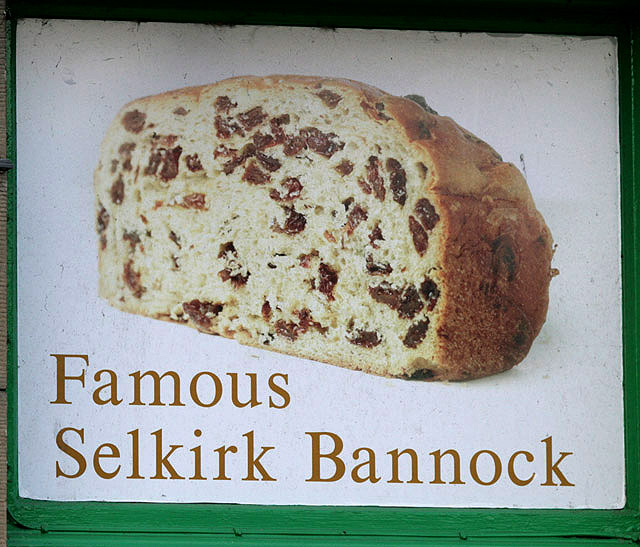
An advertisement for Selkirk bannock, displaying its interior

== See also ==
- Damper
- Frybread
- Hardtack
- Thirlage ('bannock': payment of a handful of meal to a miller's servant)
- List of British breads
- List of quick breads
