= Tortilla de rescoldo =

Type of bread

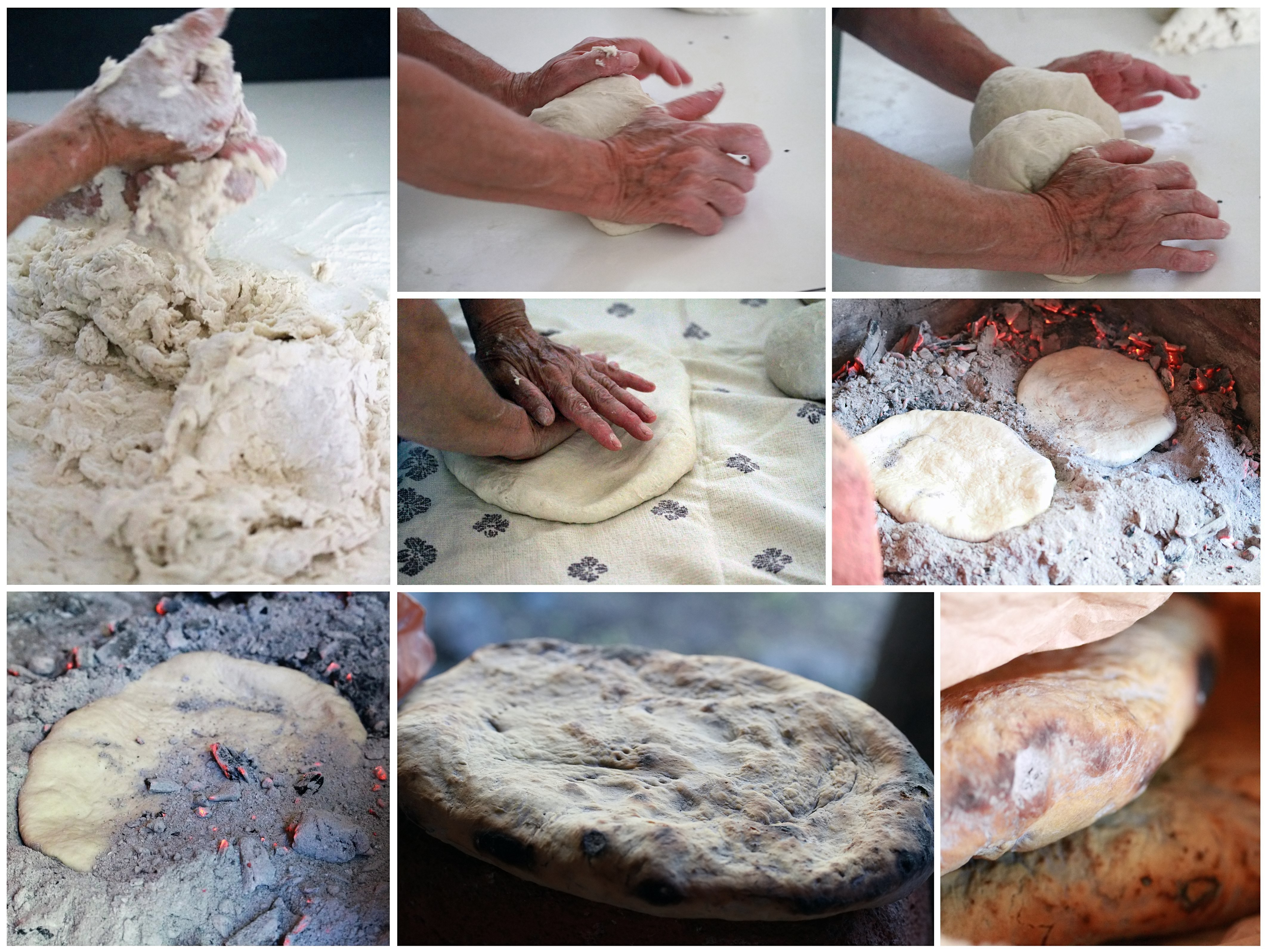
- Making tortillas de rescoldo
- Type: Bread
- Place of origin: Chile
- Main ingredients: Wheat flour

Tortilla de rescoldo or ember tortilla is a traditional Chilean flatbread, often unleavened, that was commonly prepared by rural travelers. It consists of a wheat-flour-based bread, traditionally baked in the coals of a campfire or fireplace. It is a common street food in populated areas or along roadways.

== History ==
The bread dates Spanish colonizers, who used it as a travel ration similar to pan subcinerario.

Vendors known as palomitas, typically women dressed all in white, sell the tortillas in train stations and other public areas, especially in Antihue and Laraquete.

== Ingredients ==
Typical ingredients are flour; lard, butter, vegetable shortening, or a combination; and salt; some recipes include baking soda or yeast.

== Preparation and serving ==
Ingredients are mixed to create a soft dough which is formed into disks varying from 20 centimetres (7.9 in) to 50 centimetres (20 in) in diameter. Embers are raked from the fire and the tortillas placed directly onto them.

Tortillas de rescoldo are served with butter or regional condiments.

== Flavors ==
The finished tortillas are characterized by strong flavors of smoke, ash, and char.

== Variations ==
Regional variations include those of Antihue, which include pork, and of Laraquete which is made chuchitas, a local shellfish.

== Regulations ==
Government safety regulations prevent the sale of traditional tortillas de rescoldo, requiring them to be cooked in ovens rather than on open fires and requiring the chuchitas to be preserved in vinegar. Both regulations profoundly change the taste and sensory experience of the traditional product.

== See also ==
- Damper (food)
- Takakau
