= Bere (grain) =

Landrace of barley native to Scotland

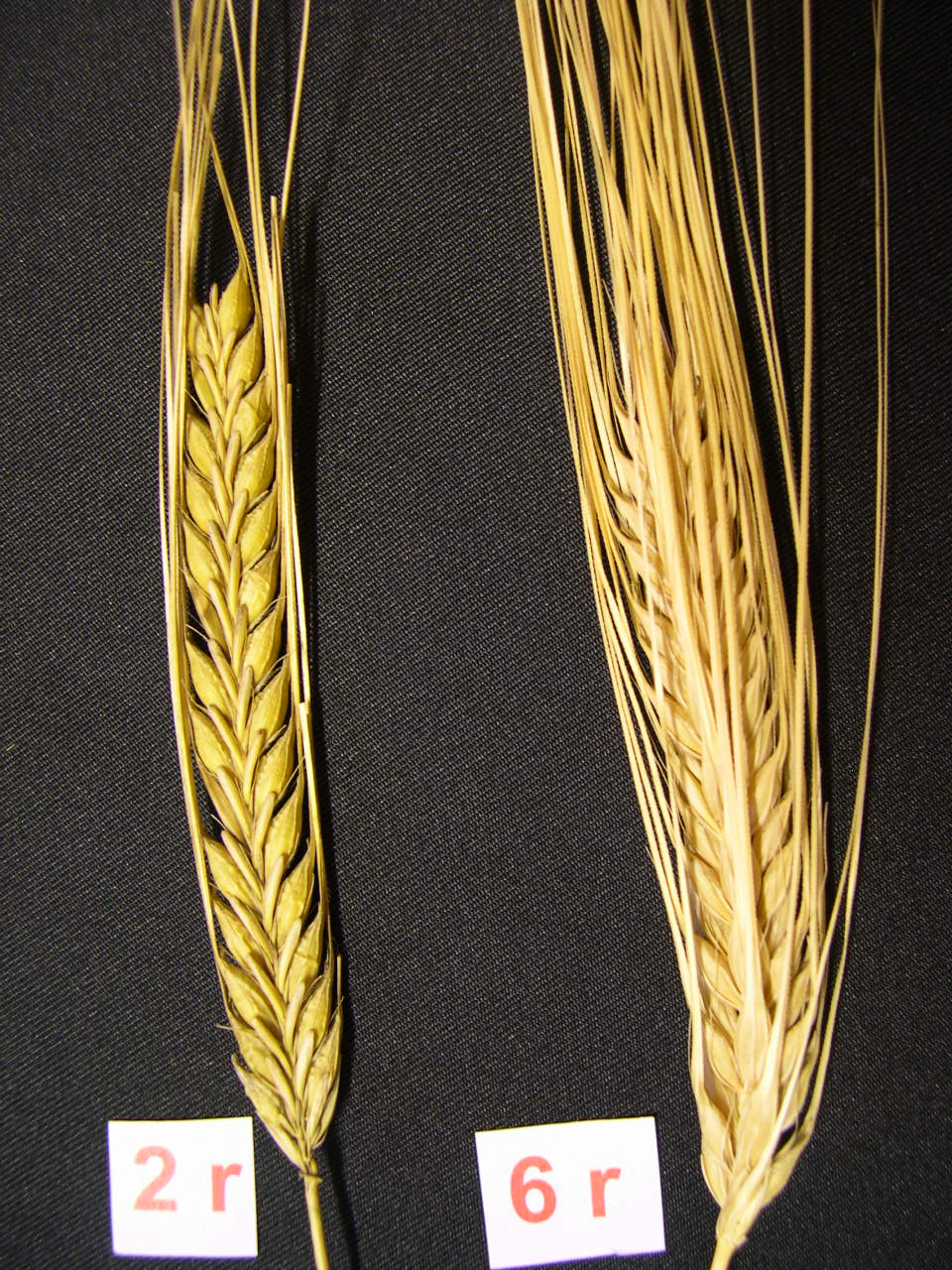
Two-row barley and six-row bere

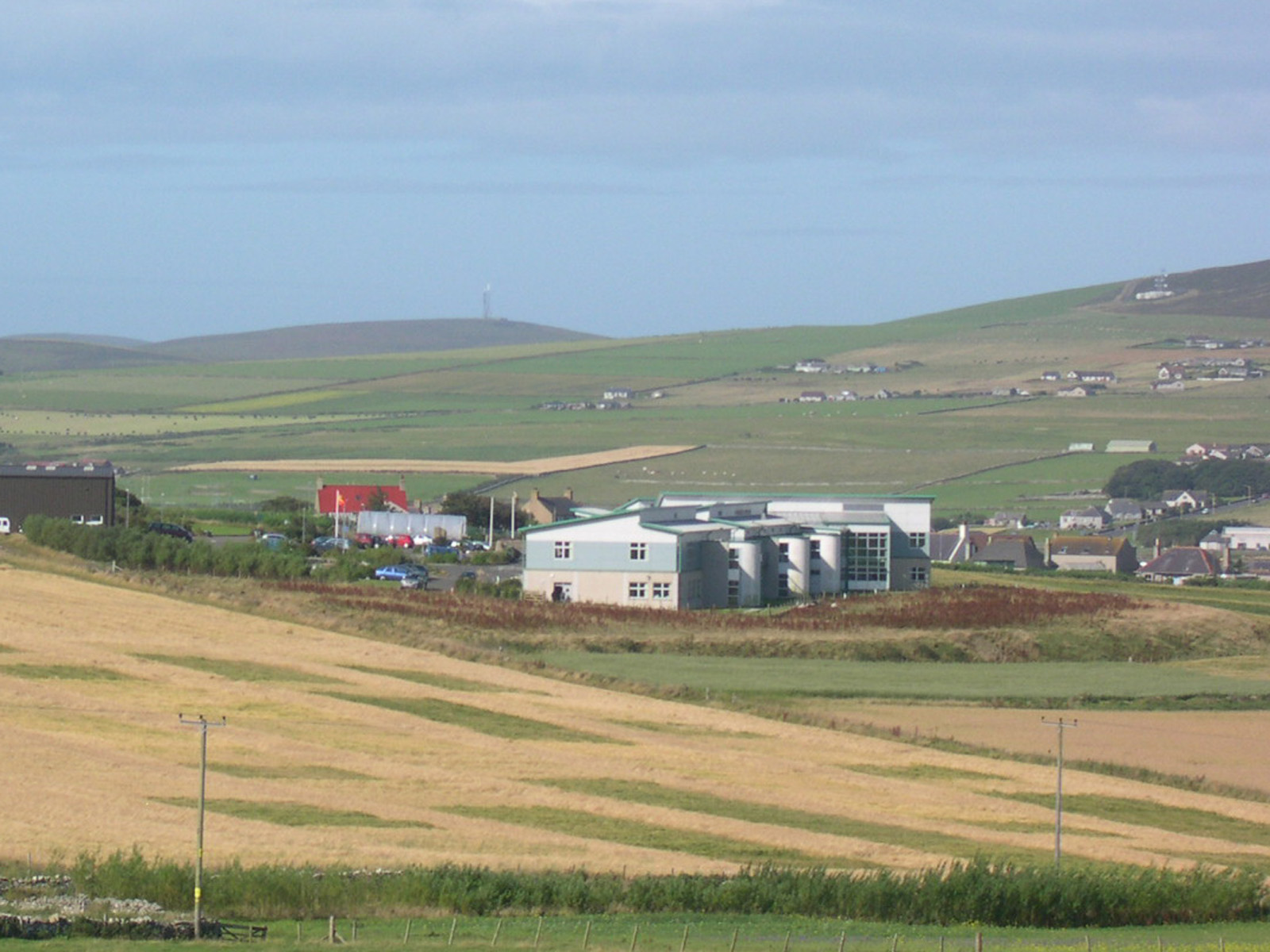
Field of ready-to-harvest bere, with plots of other varieties still green. Photo taken in late August.

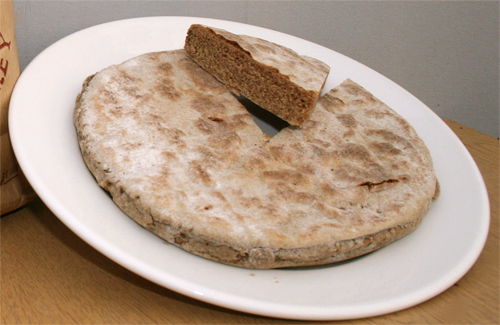
Traditional beremeal bannock, as made in Orkney, Scotland

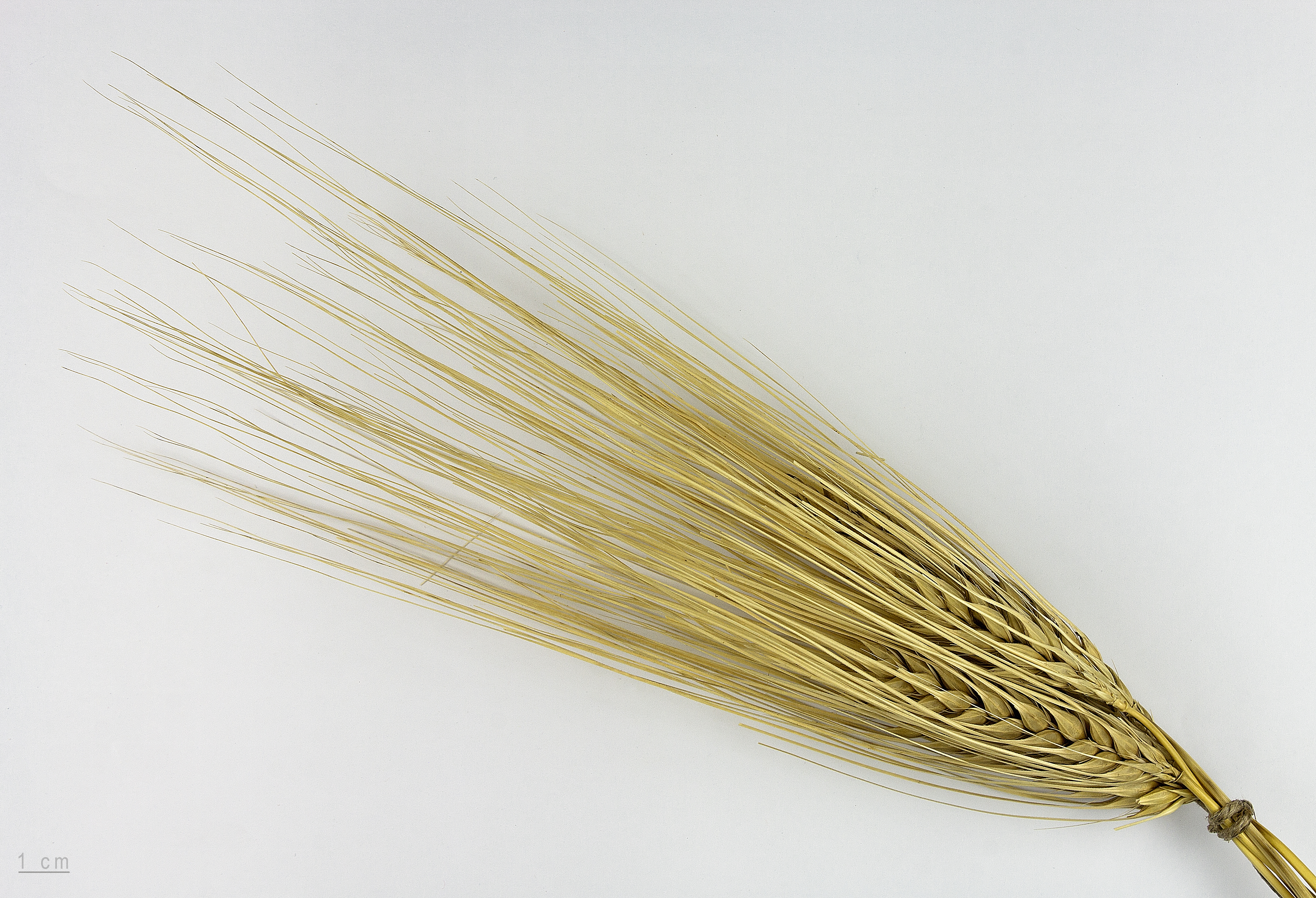
Hordeum vulgare subsp. hexastichum – MHNT

Bere (Shaetlan pronunciation: [beər] BAIR) is a six-row barley cultivated mainly on 5–15 hectares of land in Orkney, Scotland. It is also grown in Shetland, Caithness and on a very small scale by a few crofters on some of the Western Isles, such as North Uist, Benbecula, South Uist, Islay and Barra. It is probably Britain's oldest cereal in continuous commercial cultivation.

Bere is a landrace adapted to growing on soils with a low pH (acidic) and to a short growing season with long hours of daylight, as found in the high latitudes of northern Scotland. It is sown in the spring and harvested in the summer. Because of its very rapid growth rate, it is sown late but is often the first crop to be harvested. It is known locally as the 90-day barley.

== Etymology ==
Originally bere or beir or bear is a generic Scots word for barley of any kind, from Old English bere, "barley", and was used throughout the country. Now it is used mainly in the north of Scotland. It often referred to barley of a lower yield, and the phrase "bear meal marriage" usually meant one that would not bring much wealth with it. Talking of the wide variety of crops in England, and crop rotation, Professor T.C. Smout writes: "In Scotland, there is no evidence of such variation possibly because the range of crops was so much smaller — often only oats or bear (a primitive form of barley)".

== History ==
Bere is a very old grain that may have been grown in Britain since Neolithic times. Another early term for it was "bygge" or "big", probably originating from bygg, the Old Norse term for barley. It became well-adapted to the far north of Britain as successive generations of farmers grew it, selecting each year's seeds from the best plants of the previous year.

In the 19th and early 20th centuries, bere was an important crop in the Highlands and Islands region of Scotland, providing grain for milling and malting and straw for thatching and animal bedding. It was also exported from Orkney and other ports in Scotland to Northern Europe. The advent of higher-yielding barley varieties led to a deep decline in bere growing during the 19th and 20th centuries. It survives in cultivation today thanks to Barony Mills, a 19th-century watermill, which purchases the grain to produce beremeal which is used locally in bread, biscuits, and the traditional beremeal bannock.

== Research ==
The Agronomy Institute at Orkney College UHI in Scotland has had a research programme on Bere since 2002. The programme is aimed at developing new markets for the crop and developing best practices for growing it more easily and with increased yield. As a result of this research, several new markets (whisky, beer and biscuits) have been developed for Orkney Bere. The crop is also being grown on the island of Islay, for whisky production by Bruichladdich Distillery.

Research at the James Hutton Institute has shown that bere is particularly able to grow in alkaline soils with low metal micronutrients, such as the increased manganese use efficiency demonstrated when grown in manganese-deficient conditions such as those found in the Orkney Islands, resistance to the fungal disease scald, and tolerance to salinity stress. Bere flour has quite high levels of folate.

== Alcoholic beverages ==
Bere has a long history of use in making alcoholic beverages. Historical accounts from the 15th century onward show that Orkney produced large amounts of malt and beer, most of it probably from bere. An ancient tradition of making bere-based homebrew survives until this day in the islands. During the 19th century, the Campbeltown distilleries used large quantities of bere in making Scotch whisky. In the early 21st century some distillers began experimenting again with bere, and in 2006, the UK's most northern brewery released a bere-based microbrew.
