= Unleavened bread =

Bread prepared without raising agents such as yeast

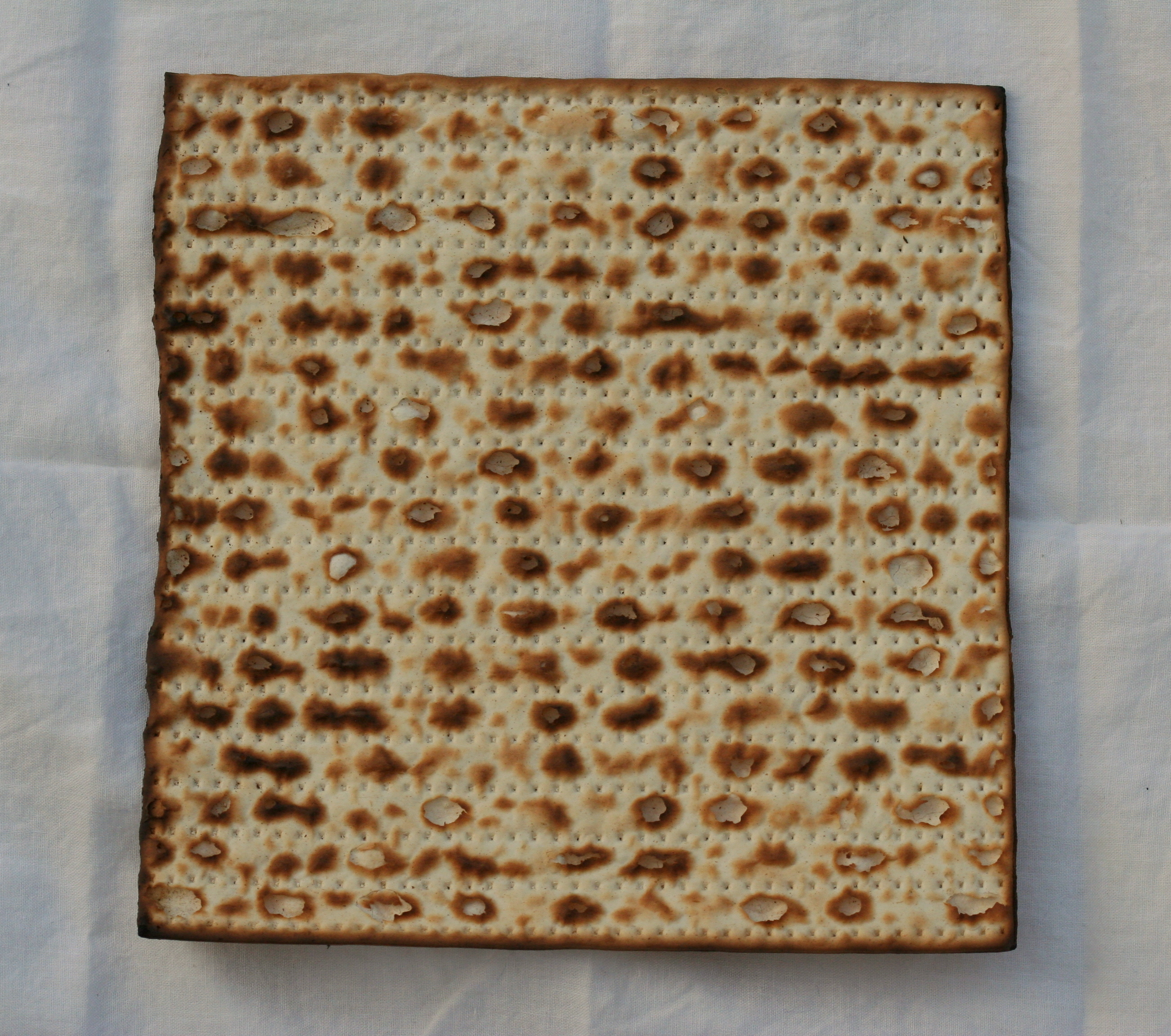
- Jewish matza eaten on Passover
- Type: Bread (usually flat bread)
- Variations: Matzo, roti, and many others

Unleavened bread is any of a wide variety of breads which are prepared without using raising agents such as yeast or sodium bicarbonate. The preparation of bread-like non-leavened cooked grain foods appeared in prehistoric times.

Unleavened breads are generally flat breads. Unleavened breads, such as tortillas and roti, are staple foods in Central America and South Asia, respectively. Unleavened sacramental bread plays a major part in Christian liturgy and Eucharistic theology.

== Religious significance ==
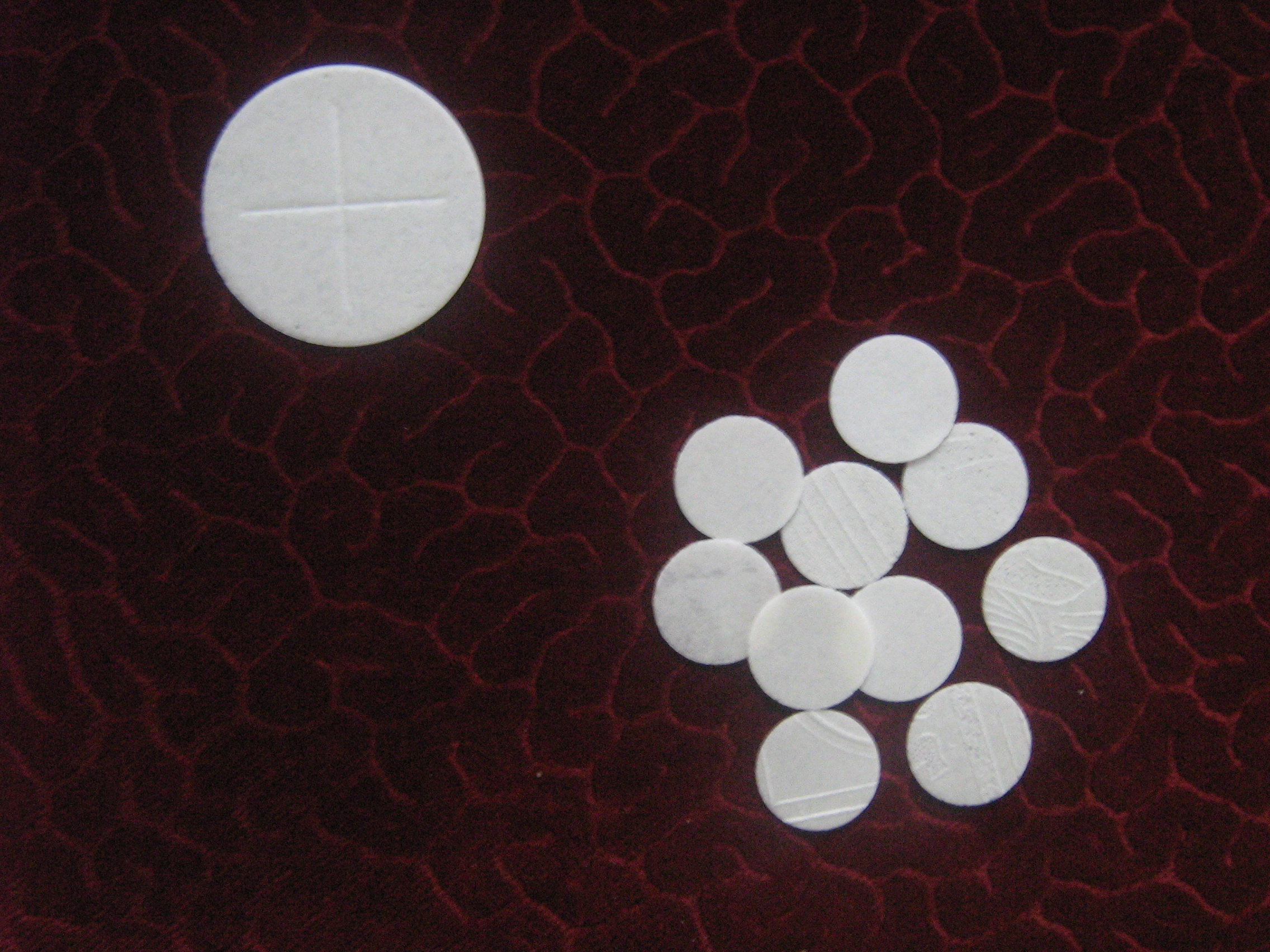
Host (communion wafers) made of azymes for celebrating the Eucharist in the Latin Church of the Catholic Church and other Western Christians (Eastern Christians such as the Eastern Orthodox use leavened bread)

Unleavened breads have symbolic importance in Judaism and Christianity. Jews and Christians consume unleavened breads such as Matzah during Passover and Eucharist, respectively, Jews as commanded the Torah: in Exodus 12:19, the Jewish people were instructed:

Seven days shall there be no leaven found in your houses: for whosoever eateth that which is leavened, even that soul shall be cut off from the congregation of Israel, whether he be a stranger, or born in the land.

Canon Law of the Latin Church within the Catholic Church mandates the use of unleavened bread for the Host, and unleavened wafers for the communion of the faithful. Some Protestant churches tend to follow the Latin Catholic practice, whereas others use either unleavened bread or wafers or ordinary (leavened) bread, depending on the traditions of their particular denomination or local usage.

On the other hand, most Eastern Churches explicitly forbid the use of unleavened bread (Greek: azymos artos) for the Eucharist. Eastern Christians associate unleavened bread with the Old Testament and allow only for bread with yeast, as a symbol of the New Covenant in Christ's blood. Indeed, this usage figures as one of the three points of contention that traditionally accounted as causes (along with the issues of Petrine supremacy and the filioque in the Niceno-Constantinopolitan Creed) of the Great Schism of 1054 between Eastern and Western churches.

== Varieties of unleavened bread ==
- Arboud – Unleavened bread made of wheat flour baked in the embers of a campfire, traditional among Arab Bedouin.
- Arepa – made of corn and corn flour, original from Colombia and Venezuela.
- Bannock – Unleavened bread originating in Ireland and the British Isles.
- Crepe – a French unleavened pancake eaten both for breakfast and dessert
- Damper – traditional Australian colonial bread, originally unleavened
- Kitcha – Ethiopian type of flat bread used mainly in the traditional fit-fit or chechebsa dish.
- Lavash (usually leavened but occasionally unleavened) – Armenian flat bread inscribed on the UNESCO Intangible Cultural Heritage Lists.
- Lefse – a Norwegian flatbread incorporating potato as a major ingredient
- Matzo – Jewish flat bread used both in religious ceremony and as ordinary food
- Piadina – from the Romagna historical region of Italy, made of wheat flour, lard or olive oil, water and salt. Up to the 1940s it could be up to 2 cm thick, while the variant of Rimini has always been much thinner.
- Piki – bread prepared by Hopi people from maize.
- Pizza dolce di Beridde – Unleavened sweet bread typical for the city of Rome.
- Pungapunga – traditional bread made among the Māori of precolonial New Zealand using collected pollen of Typha orientalis
- Rieska – Unleavened bread usually made of barley, traditional in the northern parts of Finland
- Roti – Indian flat breads including chapati, dalpuri, and variants.
- Tortilla – Mesoamerican/Mexican flat bread
- Tortilla de rescoldo – Chilean unleavened bread made of wheat flour, traditionally baked in the coals of a campfire.
- Communion bread – The bread used in the Christian Eucharist is often an unleavened one, frequently in the form of a small crisp wafer

== See also ==
- Passover
- Yeast
- Leavening
