= Fallaid =

Fallaid, in Scotland, was the dusting of meal left on the baking board, after a batch of bread has been baked. This dry meal was put on cakes when fired. An interesting custom used to prevail in the Outer Hebrides, where any meal remaining on the board would be made into a cake in the palm of the hand, and set to fire among the other and larger cakes. The custom has its origin in a superstition, that doing so keeps the store of meal from wasting. It also stems from the days when food was far less plentiful in Scotland and nothing could be wasted, except by the rich and extravagant.

== See also ==
(fallaid)
