= Bannock (Indigenous American food) =

Type of bread

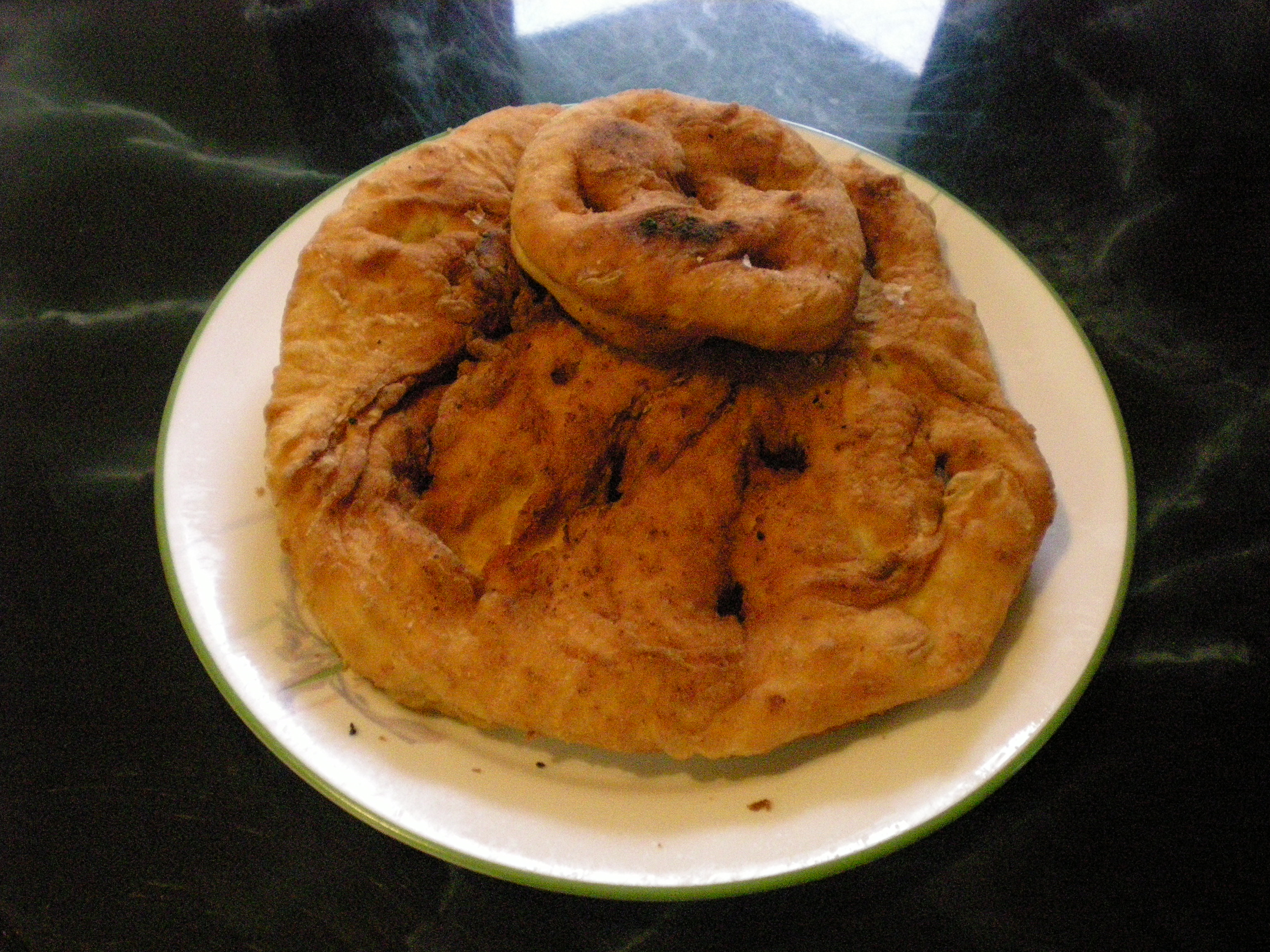
Inuit bannock

Bannock, skaan (or scone), Indian bread, alatiq, or frybread is a flatbread produced by the Indigenous peoples of the Americas now found throughout North America, including Inuit in Canada and Alaska, other Alaska Natives, the First Nations of the rest of Canada, the Native Americans in the United States, and the Métis.

== Origins ==
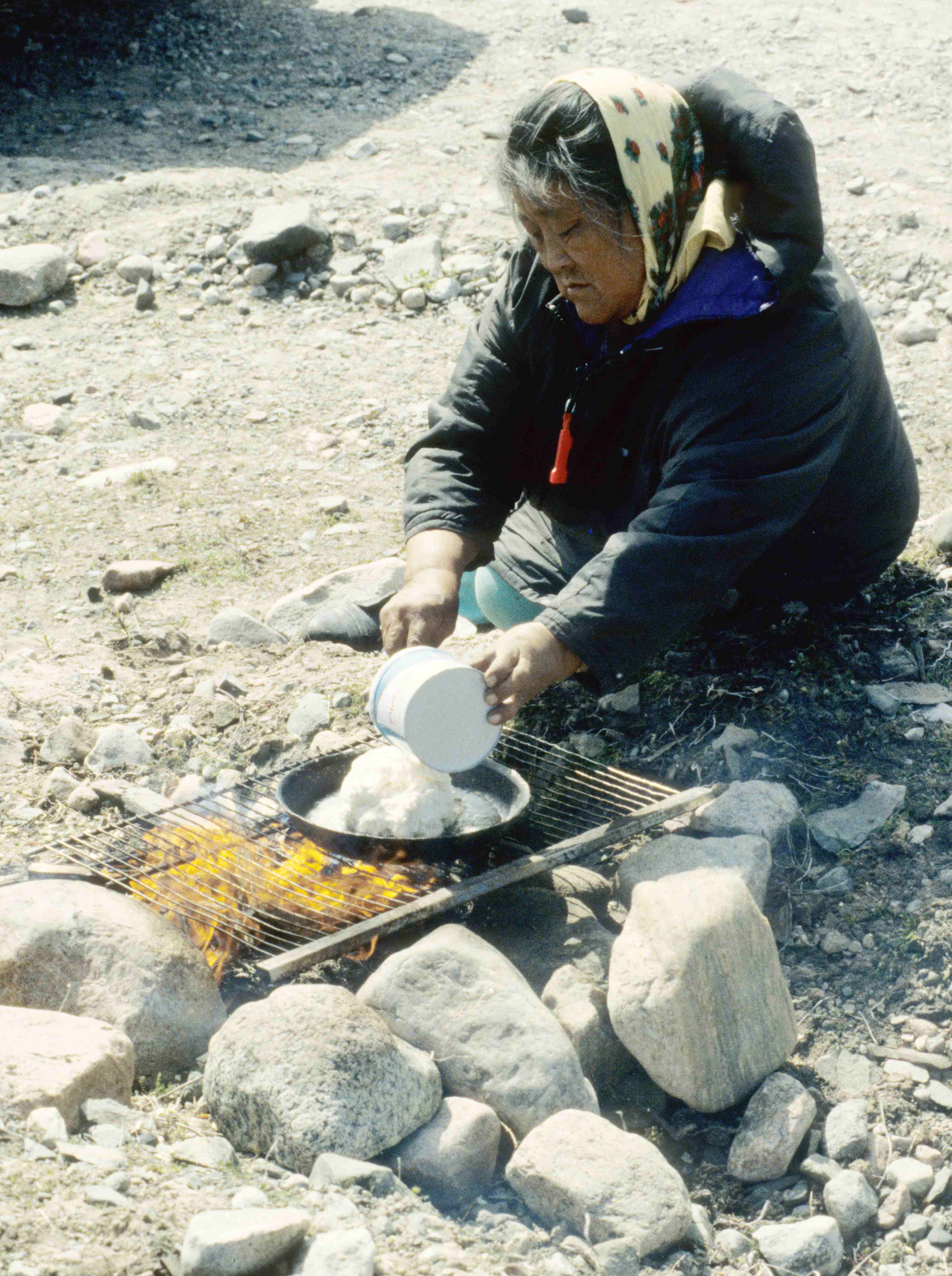
An Inuk woman preparing bannock

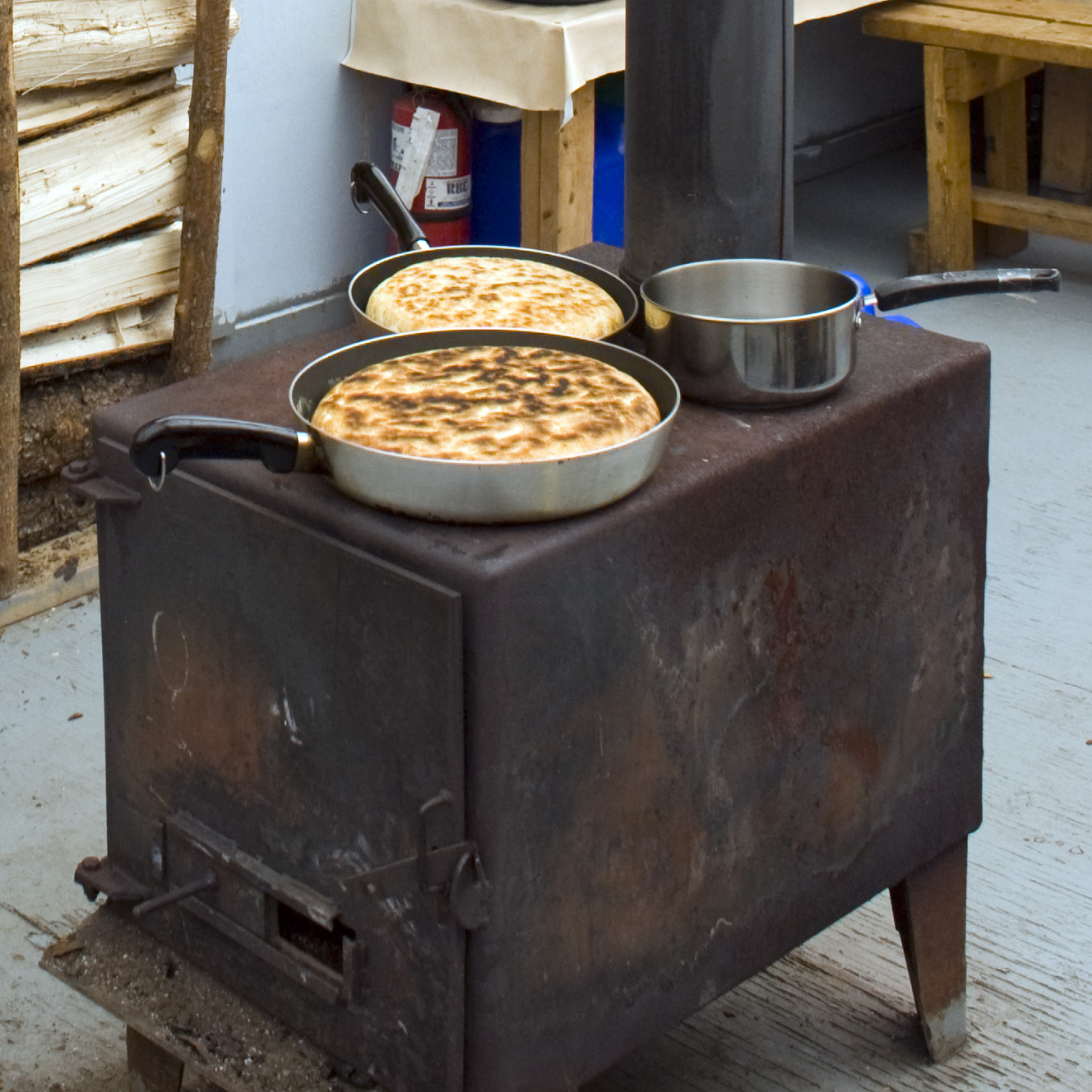
Cree bannock cooking in pans

A food made from maize, roots and tree sap may have been produced by Indigenous North Americans prior to contact with outsiders.

Native American tribes who ate camas include the Nez Perce, Cree, Coast Salish, and Blackfoot tribes, among many others. Camas bulbs, out of which bannocks can be made, contributed to the survival of members of the Lewis and Clark Expedition (1804–06).

Some sources claim that bannock was unknown in North America until the 1860s when it was created by the Navajo who were incarcerated at Fort Sumner.

According to other sources, fur traders introduced bannock to tribes in North America, and that a bread, and the name 'bannock', were originally introduced from Scotland.

== Terminology ==
Other languages do offer hints of European influence, however, for example Navajo: bááh dah díníilghaazhh "bread that bubbles" (i.e. in fat), where "bááh" is a borrowing from Spanish: pan for flour and yeast bread, as opposed to the older Navajo: łeesʼáán which refers to maize bread cooked in hot ashes Likewise, Alutiiq alatiq comes from the Russian: ола́дьи, romanized: oladyi "pancakes, fritters."

== Preparation ==
Bannock is generally prepared with white or whole-wheat flour, baking powder, sugar, lard and water or milk, which are combined and kneaded (possibly with spices, dried fruits or other flavouring agents added) then fried in rendered fat, vegetable oil, or shortening, baked in an oven or cooked on a stick.

== Political significance ==
Bannock is the most universal of dishes in the Indigenous Canadian repertoire, and is used equally in the Arctic, Plains, subarctic, and Pacific cultural areas. However, the modern recipes for bannock are clearly influenced by the government rations that were distributed on Indian reserves in the late 19th century when access to country foods (plants and animals native to the region) were restricted by the arrival of non-Indigenous settlers. Such rations included the staples of the European Canadian diet at that time: wheat flour, sugar, lard, and butter; all high-calorie, low-nutrient, shelf-stable foods produced in bulk quantities and shipped long distances (together with the preservative and flavour additive, salt). These new ingredients helped Indigenous people to survive the loss of access to country foods, and are now thought of by some as fully a part of Indigenous identity, and even as "Indian soul food". However, for others they are a reminder of the negative impacts of colonialism, and are regarded as an imposition.

== Relationship with Indigenous peoples ==
The history and political significance of bannock has changed over the years in North America. Bannock has had and continues to hold great significance to Indigenous American peoples, from pre-contact to the present.

There were many regional variations of bannock that included different types of flour, and the addition of dried or fresh fruit. Cooking methods were similarly diverse. Some rolled the dough in sand then pit-cooked it; the sand was then brushed off. Other groups baked the bannock in clay or rock ovens. Others wrapped the dough around a green, hardwood stick and toasted it over an open fire. Bannock's functionality made it simple to cook and consume while conducting daily activities at home, or hunting, trapping, fishing, and gathering out on the land.

European colonization dramatically changed the traditional ways of Indigenous Americans, including the relationship they had with bannock. Whereas bannock was once a food of function for travel and work, it became a necessary staple for Indigenous people to feed their families and stave off starvation when they were forced to give up much of their traditional food sources through the reservation system. On these reserves, traditional methods of hunting, gathering, and farming was replaced by government food rations, usually consisting of flour and lard. As a result of this policy, indigenous knowledge of edible plants and other natural foodstuff was lost, while wheat and flour entered into Indigenous bannock recipes, drastically altering their nature.

== See also ==
- Bannock (British and Irish food)
- Damper (food)
- Hardtack
- Frybread, another contemporary bread from Indigenous American traditions
- List of quick breads
- Smoke Signals (film), in which bannock (frybread) plays a major part
- Takakau
