= History of bread =

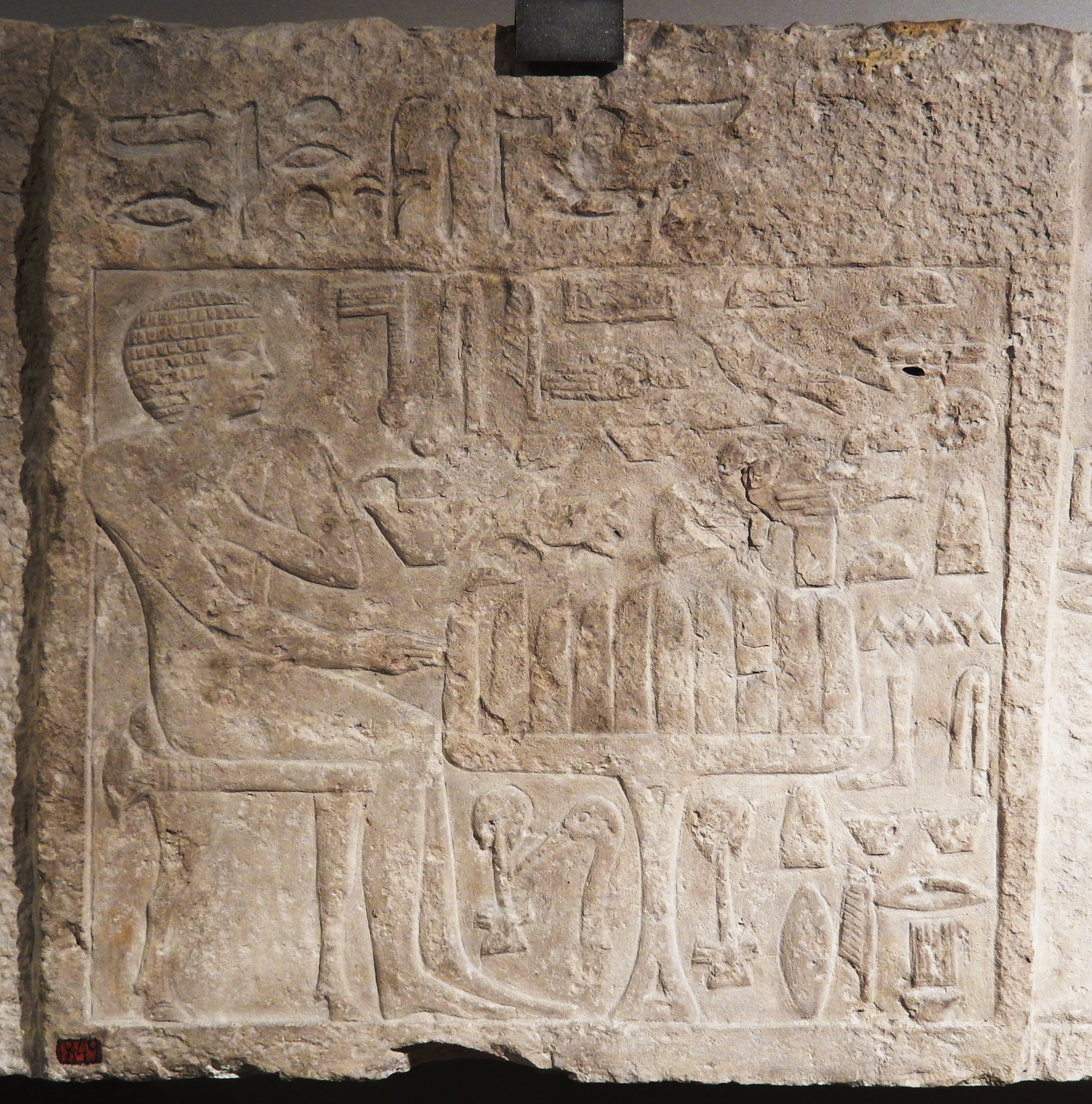
Slab stele from mastaba tomb of Itjer at Giza. 4th Dynasty, 2543–2435 BC. Itjer is seated at a table with slices of bread, shown vertical by convention. Egyptian Museum, Turin.

Bread was central to the formation of early human societies. From the Fertile Crescent, where wheat was domesticated, cultivation spread north and west, to Europe and North Africa, and east toward East Asia. This in turn led to the formation of towns, which curtailed nomadic lifestyles, and gave rise to other forms of societal organization. Similar developments occurred in the Americas with maize and in Asia with rice.

== Prehistory ==
Charred crumbs of "unleavened flat bread-like products" made by Natufian hunter-gatherers, likely cooked from wild wheat, wild barley and Bolboschoenus glaucus tubers between 14,600 and 11,600 years ago, have been found at the archaeological site of Shubayqa 1 in the Black Desert in Jordan. These remains predate the earliest-known making of bread from cultivated wheat by thousands of years. Grinding stones recently unearthed in Australia have been dated to 60,000 years ago and are currently the earliest evidence of seed processing in the world. Grinding stones dating to 30,000 years have been found elsewhere in Australia, Europe, China, and the Levant, although there is no definitive evidence that these tools or their products were used for making breads, except in Australia.

Bread is otherwise strongly associated with agriculture. Wheat was domesticated in the Fertile Crescent. Bread is found in Neolithic sites in Turkey and Europe from around 9,100 years ago.

== Egypt ==
There is extensive evidence of breadmaking in prehistoric Egypt during the Neolithic period, some 5,000 to 6,000 years ago, in the form of artistic depictions, remains of structures and items used in breadmaking, and remains of the dough and bread itself.

Findings from ancient Egypt follow those from prehistoric or predynastic Egypt:

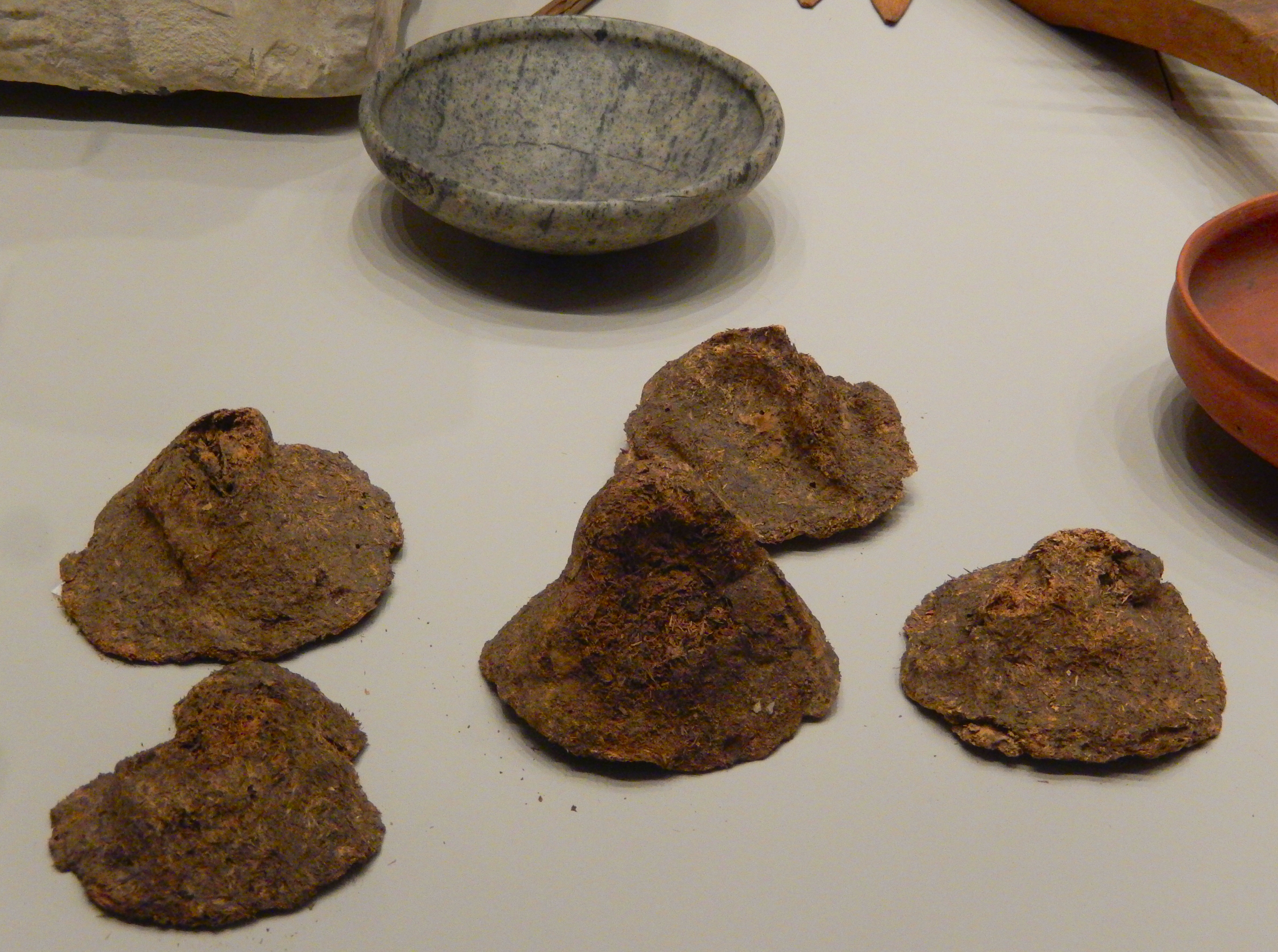
Conical loaves of bread as grave goods exactly as laid out in the Great Tomb, North Necropolis, Gebelein, 5th Dynasty (Old Kingdom), 2435–2305 BC. Excavations by Ernesto Schiaparelli, 1911. Egyptian Museum, Turin, S. 14051-14055.

The ancient Egyptians had as cereals three kinds of wheat — Triticum sativa, zea and spelta; barley, Hordeum vulgar ey and doura, Holcus sorghum, specimens of which may be seen in the Egyptian Gallery at the British Museum.

== Yeast and oven in antiquity ==
The most common source of leavening in antiquity was to retain a piece of dough from the previous day to utilize as a form of sourdough starter. Pliny the Elder reported that the Gauls and Iberians used the foam skimmed from beer to produce "a lighter kind of bread than other peoples". Parts of the ancient world that drank wine instead of beer used a paste composed of grape must and flour that was allowed to begin fermenting, or wheat bran steeped in wine, as a source for yeast. Also, different forms of currency were exchanged in Ancient Egypt before they began using coinage in the first millennium BC. Until this time, they did not rely on silver or gold, but instead exchanged everyday goods. For the poor, bread and beer were used to pay subsistence workers.

The idea of a free-standing oven that could be pre-heated, with a door for access, appears to have been Greek.

== Americas ==
In the Americas, the Mayans were known as "the men of corn" and used that corn to create foods such as tortillas, tamales, and other breads. The people of modern-day Mexico have adopted these traditions, making corn and bread a popular part of Mexican dishes.

== Ancient types and shapes of bread ==
Even in antiquity, there was a wide variety of breads. On the contrary to any concept of bread we may have nowadays (i.e. wheaten, leavened, baked), was the maza of the ancient Greeks, a very popular food made of barley meal, the preparation of which did not involve either leavening or baking, and Solon declared that wheat bread might only be baked for feast days. By the 5th century BC, bread could be purchased in Athens from a baker's shop, and in Rome, Greek bakers appeared in the 2nd century BC, as Hellenized Asia Minor was added to Roman dominion as the province of Asia; the foreign bakers of bread were permitted to form a collegium. In the Deipnosophistae, the author Athenaeus (c. 170 – c. 230 AD) describes some of the bread, cakes, and pastries available in the Classical world. Among the breads mentioned are griddle cakes, honey-and-oil bread, mushroom-shaped loaves covered in poppy seeds, and the military specialty of rolls baked on a spit. The type and quality of flours used to produce bread could also vary, as noted by Diphilus when he declared that "bread made of wheat, as compared with that made of barley, is more nourishing, more digestible, and in every way superior. In order of merit, the bread made from refined [thoroughly sieved] flour comes first, after that bread from ordinary wheat, and then the unbolted, made of flour that has not been sifted". The essentiality of bread in the diet was reflected in the name for the rest of the meal: ópson, "condiment", i.e., bread's accompaniment, whatever it might be.

== Middle Ages ==
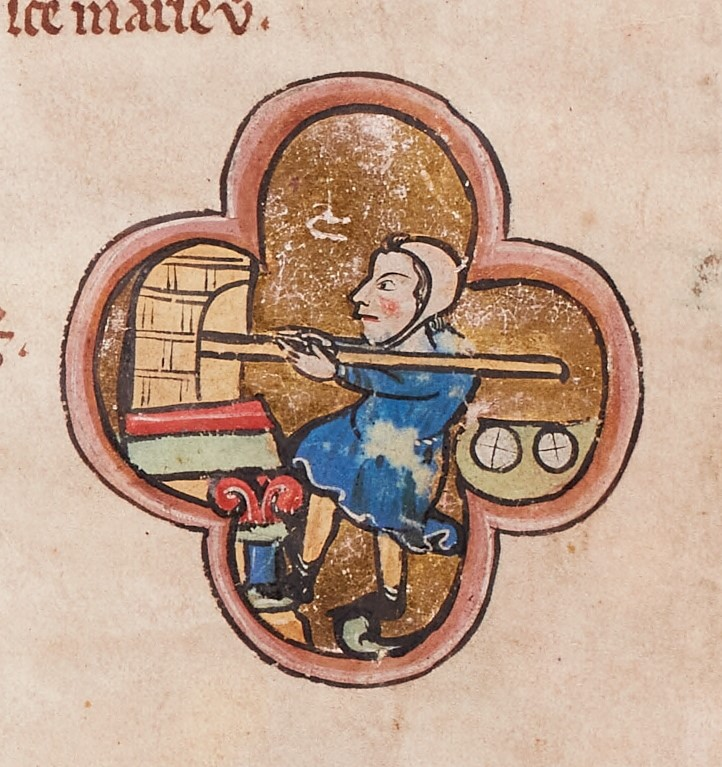
Baker baking bread in an oven – miniature in a 13th-century psalter

=== Umayyad Caliphate (662–750 CE) ===
Ibn al-Jawzi records in Al-Muntazam fi Tarikh al-Muluk wal-Umam that during the Umayyad Caliphate (662–750 CE), the region of Mesopotamia—stretching along both banks of the Tigris and Euphrates rivers—along with Egypt on the Nile and several other riverine areas, served as major centers and reservoirs for wheat production. The fertility of the black soil, coupled with the agricultural reforms implemented during this period, played a key role in the development and enhancement of wheat cultivation.

These efforts led to a significant increase in crop yields through improved irrigation techniques, the selection of high-quality seeds, and the appointment of skilled and experienced supervisors to oversee agricultural processes, especially in Iraq, Medina, Yemen, and regions surrounding Damascus. Wheat occupied most of the cultivated land and was the most important crop in terms of production, as it constituted the staple food of the populations in these areas. Its cultivation techniques were passed down through generations, ensuring the continuity and centrality of wheat farming in the region’s agricultural activities.

=== Abbasid Caliphate (750–1258 CE) ===
During the Abbasid Caliphate (750–1258 CE), bread-making witnessed significant advancements compared to the Umayyad period, benefiting from economic prosperity, urban development, and the progress of culinary and nutritional sciences. Wheat remained the principal crop in Iraq, Egypt, and Khorasan, while barley and millet were used mainly by the poor and the soldiers.

Bread-making evolved from a domestic activity into a specialized craft: public bakeries emerged in major cities, and bakers were organized into professional guilds under government supervision. A wide variety of breads appeared, including white bread, raqāq (thin bread), flavored bread, and barley bread. Stone and clay ovens, as well as fine sieves, were used in the process. Bread became an essential component of daily meals, featured prominently at banquets and official feasts, and was also distributed by caliphs to the poor on religious occasions.

During this period, bread began to be used for making sandwiches. According to Nawal Nasrallah, the surviving records about the Arabic sandwich from the Abbasid era appear in cookbooks, treatises on food and medicine, and even in food-related poetry and anecdotes. These sources describe several sandwich recipes, known as “bazmāward” and “awsāt”, as mentioned in Kitāb al-Ṭabīkh by Ibn Sayyar al-Warraq (10th century), who devoted an entire chapter to sandwiches, and later in Kitab al-Tabikh by al-Baghdadi (13th century).

One recipe, named after Caliph al-Ma’mun, reads:

“The chicken is cut into pieces and arranged over raqāq bread; beneath it is spread a layer of peeled walnuts, citron leaves, mint, tarragon, and basil with salt and badrakh (a kind of seasoning).”

=== Medieval Europe ===
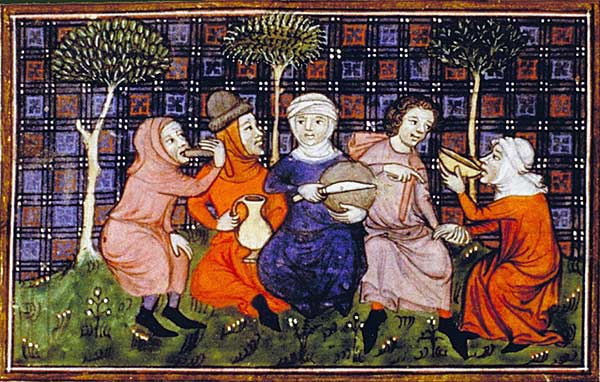
Peasants sharing bread, from the Livre du roi Modus et de la reine Ratio, France, 14th century (Bibliothèque nationale)

In medieval Europe, bread served not only as a staple food but also as part of the table service. In the standard table setting of the day the trencher, a piece of stale bread roughly 6 inches by 4 inches (15 cm by 10 cm), was served as an absorbent plate. When food was scarce, an all-too-common occurrence in medieval Europe, the trencher when served would typically be eaten with or after a meal. In times of relative abundance, trenchers could be given to the poor or fed to the dogs. It was not until the 15th century that trenchers made of wood started to replace the bread variety. In Britain the price, weight, and quality of bread and beer were regulated by the Assize of Bread and Ale from the 13th century. Later in the 13th century, two further quasi-statutes were passed: The Judgement of Pillory and the Statute of English Bakers. Assizes were abandoned in Glasgow in 1801, in London in 1815 and in the rest of Britain in 1836.

== To the 19th century ==
The Corn Laws inflated the price of bread in the UK. The Anti-Corn Law League demanded cheap bread. After repeal of the Corn Laws in 1846 cereal duties were substantially reduced and abolished in 1869.

From the late 18th century to the end of the 19th century, bread sold in England and the United States was often adulterated with hazardous materials, including chalk, sawdust, alum, plaster, clay and ammonium carbonate. Frederick Accum was the first to raise alarm to the food adulteration in 1820. In 1837, American health reformer Sylvester Graham published Treatise on Bread and Bread-Making, which described how to use unrefined wheat flour to make Graham bread at home, in response to adulterated bread sold in public bake houses.

The adulteration of bread gradually came to an end with government action, such as the 1860 and 1899 Food Adulteration Acts in Britain. America had a more difficult time ending these processes of adulteration, however, as various states had varying policies regarding bread making.

In the mid-19th century, Britain imported much of its bread wheat from the United States.

== Industrialization ==
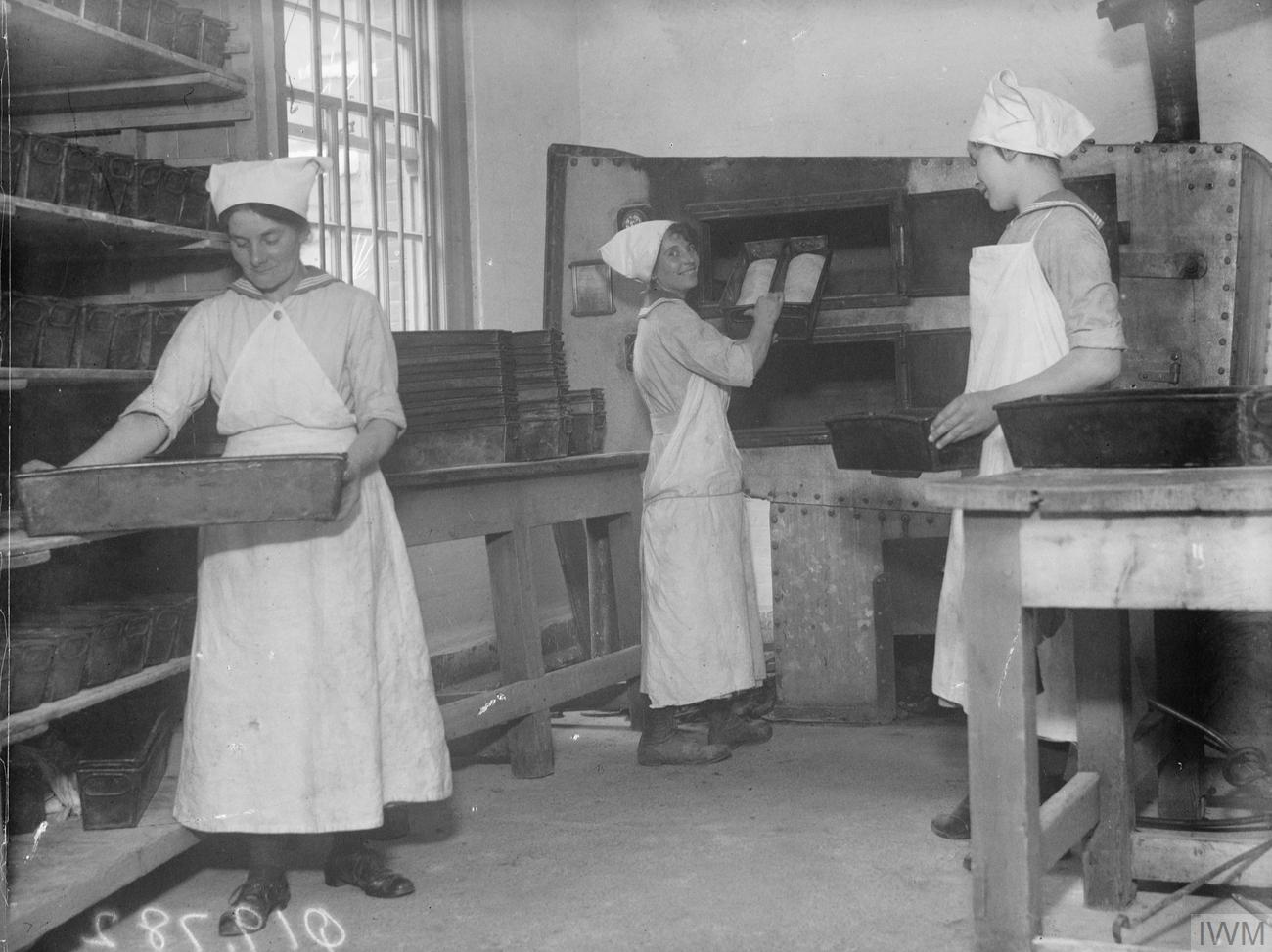
Bakers making bread during World War I

Bread-baking was industrialized at the start of the 20th century. Otto Frederick Rohwedder developed a prototype bread-slicing machine in 1912, and a practical machine that both sliced and wrapped bread in 1928.

It was discovered early on that while bran- and wheatgerm-discarding milling process can help improve white flour's shelf life, it does remove nutrients like some dietary fiber, iron, B vitamins, micronutrients and essential fatty acids. The US government has mandated since 1941 fortification of white flour-based foods with some of the nutrients lost in milling, like thiamin, riboflavin, niacin, and iron. This mandate came about in response to the vast nutrient deficiencies seen in US military recruits at the start of World War II.

A major change in the United Kingdom was the development in 1961 of the Chorleywood bread process. This used the intense mechanical working of dough, and control of gases touching dough, to dramatically reduce the fermentation period and the time taken to produce a loaf at the expense of taste and nutrition.

For generations, white bread was the preferred bread of the rich while the poor ate dark (whole grain) bread. However, in most Western societies, the connotations reversed in the late 20th century, with whole-grain bread becoming preferred as having superior nutritional value while Chorleywood bread became associated with lower-class ignorance of nutrition.

More recently, and especially in smaller retail bakeries, chemical additives are used that both speed up mixing time and reduce necessary fermentation time, so that a batch of bread may be mixed, made up, risen, and baked in fewer than three hours. Dough that does not require fermentation because of chemical additives is called "quick bread" by commercial bakers. The introduction of commercial yeasts during the 19th century was detrimental to sourdough as these sped up the baking process making production much easier. Common additives include reducing agents such as L-cysteine or sodium metabisulfite, and oxidants such as potassium bromate or ascorbic acid; this last ingredient is added to whole meal bread to increase the softness of the loaf. Calcium was added to flour in the UK to prevent rickets, which had been detected as common in women who joined the World War II effort.

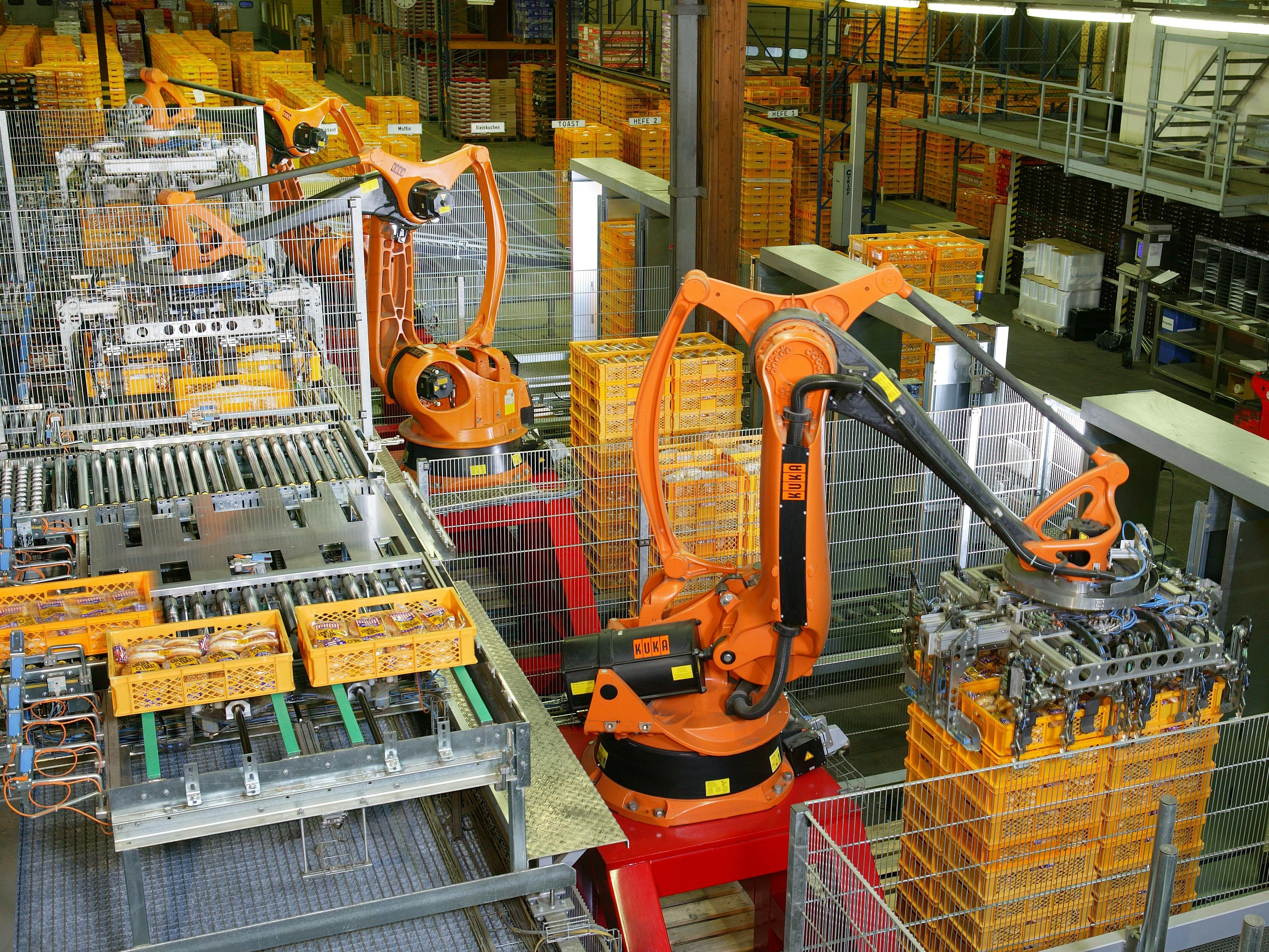
An automated bakery with industrial robots palletizing bread, Germany

However, in the 1980s, demand for sourdough in the UK grew to the point that in 1993, regulations were drawn up to define what could be sold as sourdough bread. In Germany, sourdough continued to be used for rye bread, even as commercial yeasts became more popular.

Since 1986, domestic bread makers that automate the process of making bread have become popular in the home.

== See also ==
- Food history
- Bread in culture
