= Bread in culture =

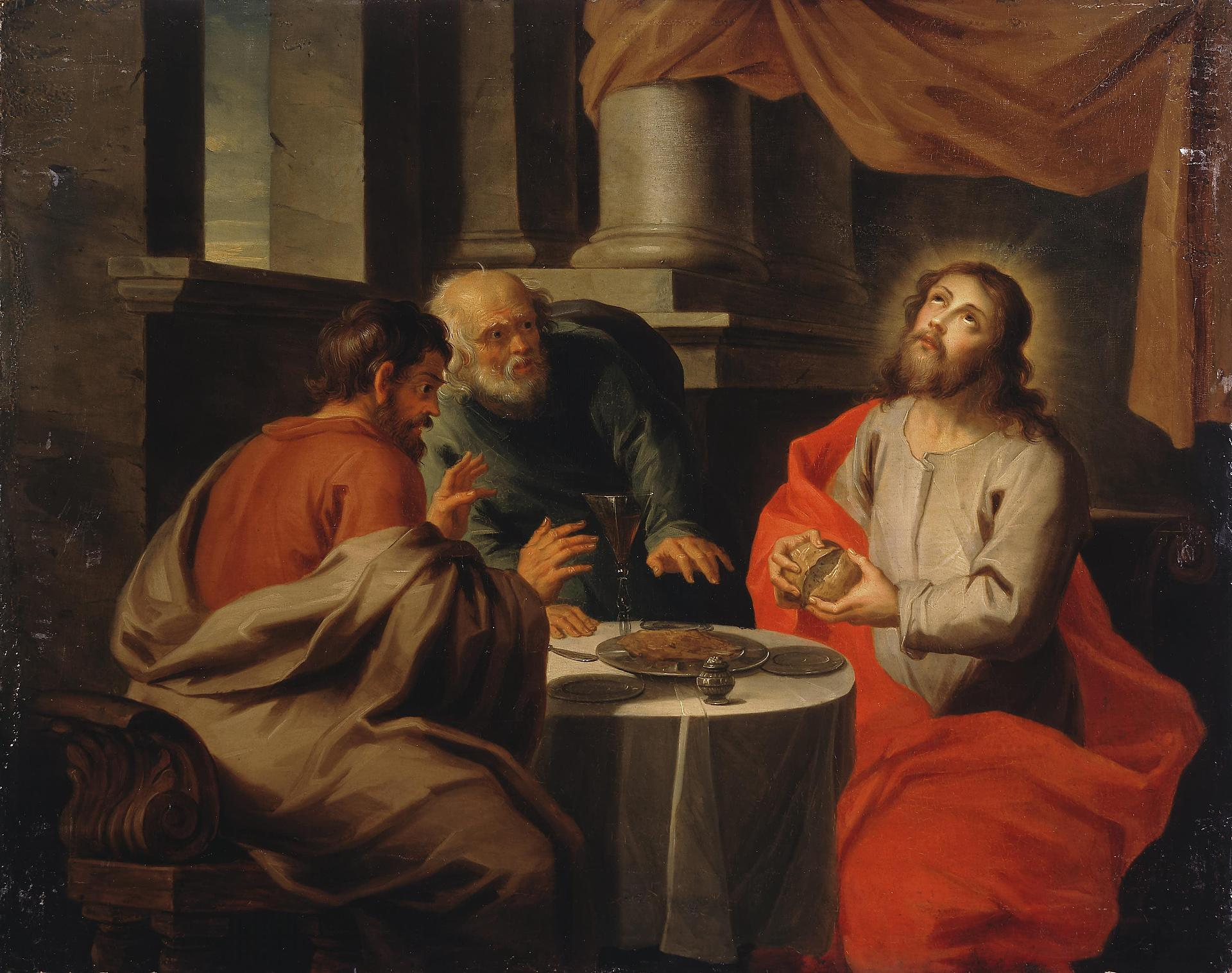
Christ breaking bread at the supper at Emmaus

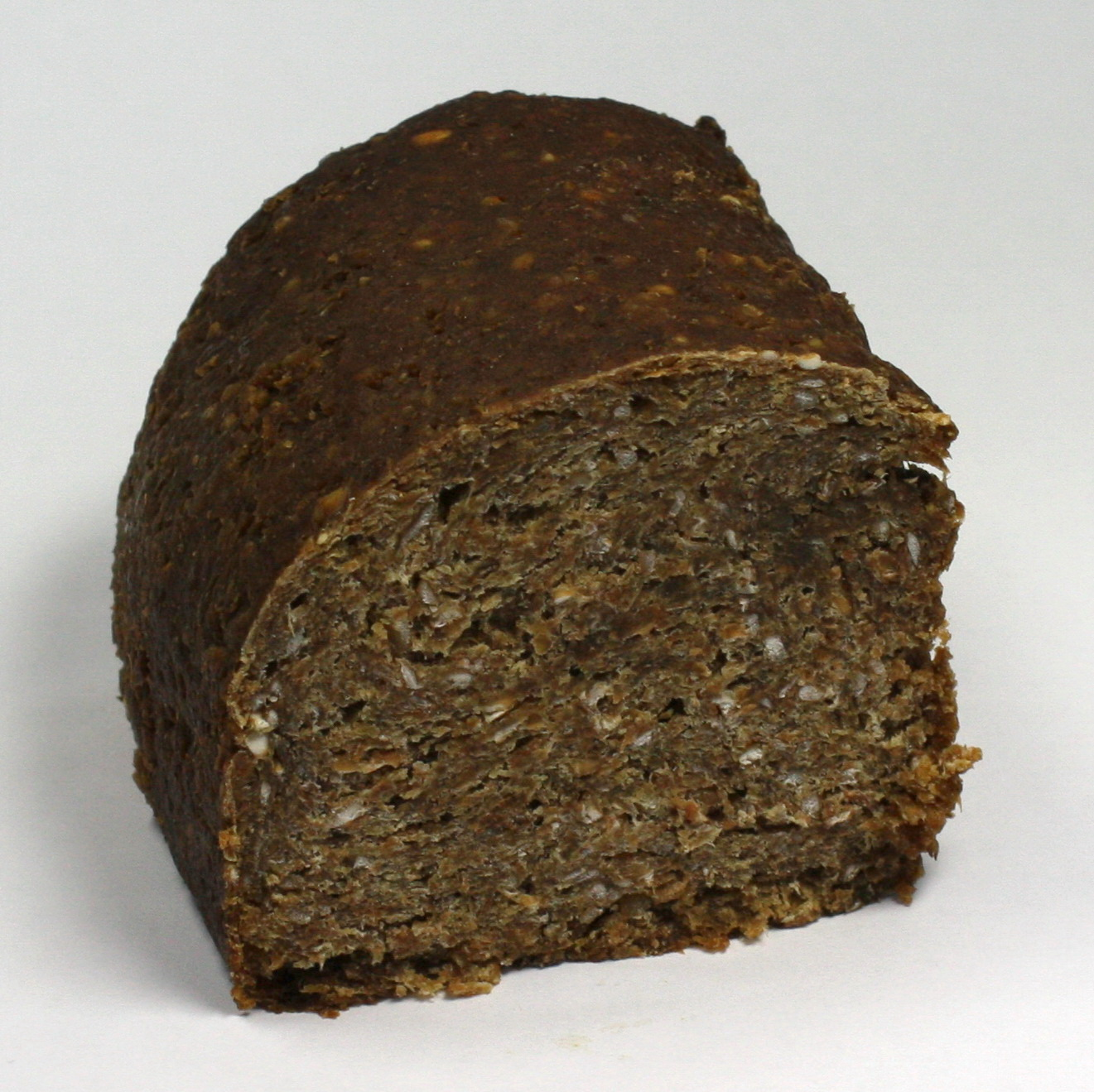
Dark sprouted bread

Bread holds significance beyond mere nutrition in many cultures across the Western world and Asia because of its history and contemporary importance. Bread is also significant in Christianity as one of the elements (alongside wine) of the Eucharist; see sacramental bread. The word companion comes from Latin com- "with" + panis "bread".

The political significance of bread is considerable. In 19th-century Britain, the inflated price of bread due to the Corn Laws caused major political and social divisions, and was central to debates over free trade versus protectionism. The Assize of Bread and Ale in the 13th century demonstrated the importance of bread in medieval times by setting heavy punishments for short-changing bakers, and bread appeared in Magna Carta a half-century earlier.

As with other foods, choosing the "right" kind of bread serves as a social signal, for example, that the person buying expensive bread is financially secure or that the person buying whatever type of bread the current fashions deem most healthful is a health-conscious consumer.

... bread has become an article of food of the first necessity; and properly so, for it constitutes of itself a complete life-sustainer, the gluten, starch, and sugar, which it contains, represents azotised and hydro-carbonated nutrients, and combining the sustaining powers of the animal and vegetable kingdoms in one product. Mrs Beeton (1861)

As a simple, cheap, and adaptable type of food, bread is often used as a synecdoche for food in general in some languages and dialects, such as Greek and Punjabi. There are many variations on the basic recipe of bread worldwide, such as bagels, baguettes, biscuits, bocadillo, brioche, chapatis, Challah, lavash, naan, pitas, pizza, pretzels, puris, tortillas, Roti, Paratha and many others. There are various types of traditional "cheese breads" in many countries, including Brazil, Colombia, Italy, and Russia.

== Across the world ==
=== Asia ===
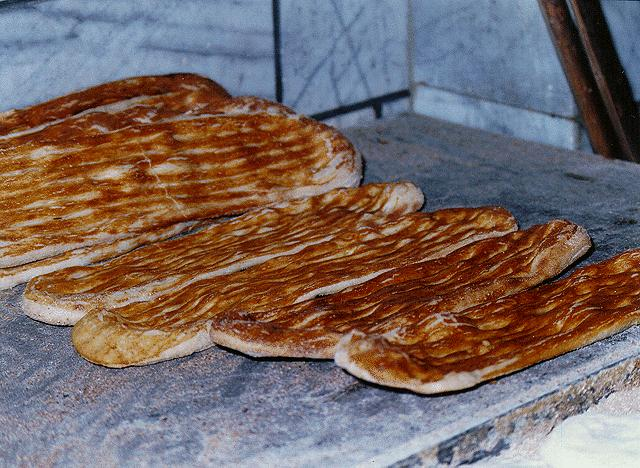
Barbari bread in Iran

Sangak, barbari, taftoon and lavash are the most popular breads in Iran. Iranian breads are prepared in different compositions, shapes, sizes, textures, colors, and flavors.

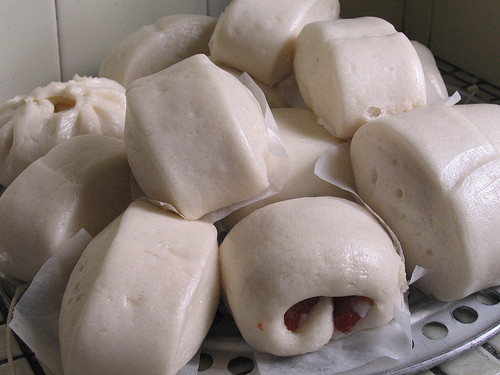
Classic white Chinese Mantou

The traditional bread in China is mantou. It is made by steaming or deep-frying dough made from wheat flour. In Northern China and northern central China, mantou is often eaten as an alternative staple to rice. Steamed mantou is similar to Western white bread, but because it is not baked, it lacks a brown crust. Mantou that have a filling such as meat or vegetables (cha siu bao, for example) are called baozi. The kompyang of Fuzhou is an example of a Chinese bread baked in a clay oven.

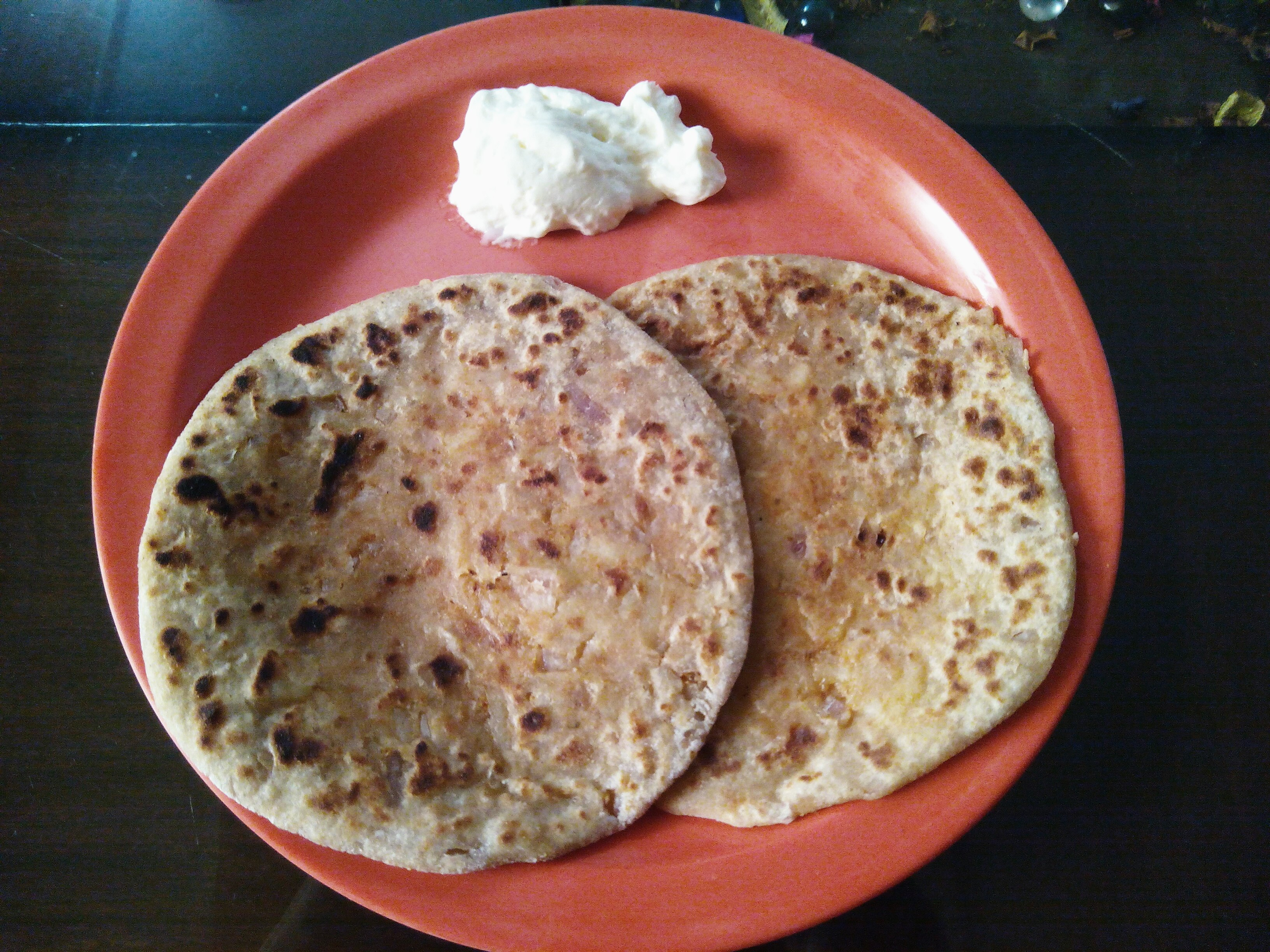
Aloo paratha served with butter, from India

In the Indian subcontinent, chapati or roti, types of unleavened flatbreads usually made from whole-wheat flour or sometimes refined wheat flour and baked on a hot iron griddle called a tava, form the mainstay of the people's diet. The chapati, as it came to be known, is an unleavened bread with a long tradition. The bread can be spelled Chapathi, Chapatti, or Chappati. Rotis and naans are usually served with curry throughout the region. A variant called makki di roti uses maize flour rather than white flour. Another variant is puri, a thin flat bread that is fried rather than baked and puffs up while cooked. Paratha is another variation on roti. Naan (leavened wholewheat bread) is baked in a tandoor or clay oven and is rarely prepared at home. White and brown breads are also very common, but not as common as roti.

In the Philippines, pandesal (or pan de sal, meaning bread of salt or salt bread) is a round bread commonly eaten by Filipinos for breakfast. The Philippines also produces a cheap generic white bread called Pinoy Tasty.

=== Europe ===
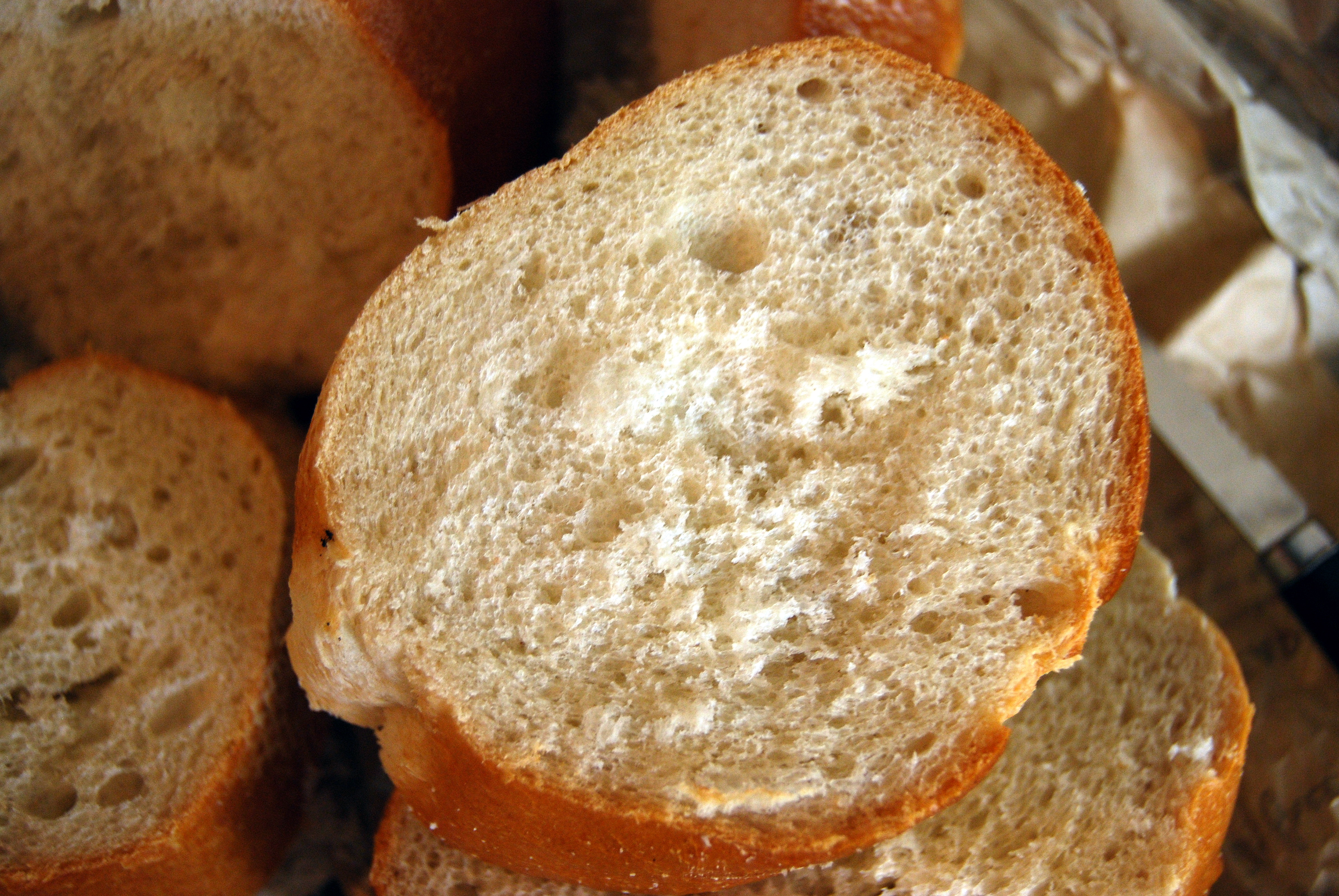
French bread

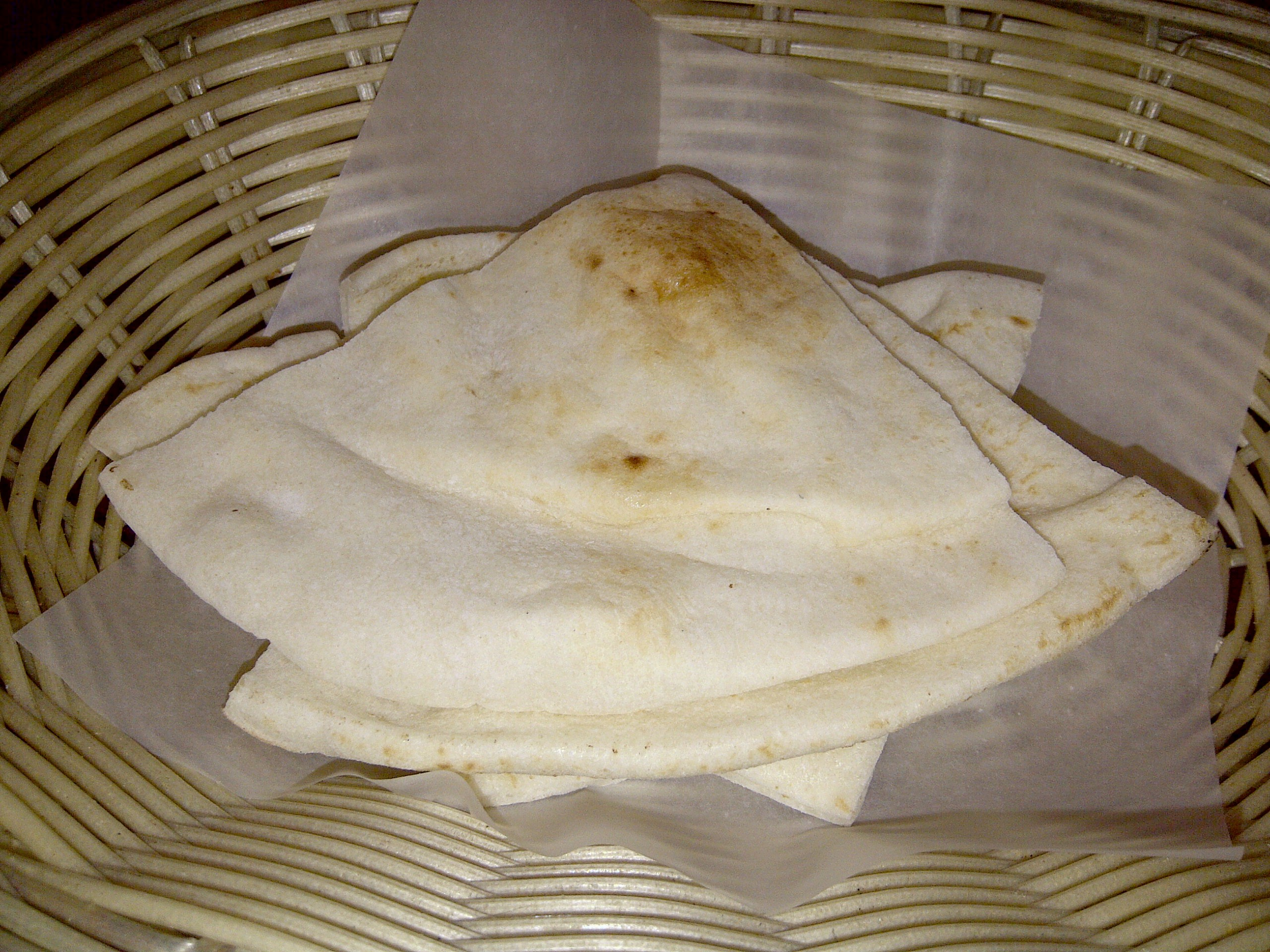
Arabian pita bread

An enormous variety of bread is available across Europe. Germany alone lays claim to over 1,300 basic varieties of breads, rolls, and pastries, as well as having the largest consumption of bread per capita worldwide. Bread and salt is a welcome greeting ceremony in many central and eastern European cultures. During important occasions when guests arrive, they are offered a loaf of bread with a salt holder to represent hospitality.

In France, there has been a huge decline in the baguette culture. In the 1970s, French people consumed an average of 1 loaf of bread per day. Only a century ago, the French ate approximately 3 loaves of bread per day. Today, French people eat only half a loaf of bread per day. In response to this decline, bakers have launched a national campaign to encourage people to call the bakery before and after work, just as they used to. The campaign models the American "Got Milk?" campaign, plastering "Hey there, have you picked up the bread?" all over billboards and bread bags.

During the 18th century, the moral economy of France was based on wheaten bread. By supplying sufficient bread to the people, the government demonstrated its strong political fitness. Wheaten bread was also considered indispensable to one's well-being after French medical chemists had associated gluten with several nourishing elements in plants. As bread had a high gluten content compared to other cereals, it was given a reputation of being the ideal alimentary. Consequently, consumers became extremely concerned with the quality of their wheaten bread, resulting in a meticulous surveillance of wheaten bread production; they did not want their bread to contain filler additives such as bran, rye, barley, and legume flour. At the time, bread was the most sought-after food because it was considered essential, universal, and highly nutritious. It was typical for the average French citizen to believe that overindulging in bread was impossible. For many, bread became the centerpiece of every meal. All other foods, such as fruits, vegetables, and meats, were thought of as subsidiary, or ancillary to nourishment.

There is a wide variety of traditional breads in Great Britain, often baked in rectangular tins. Round loaves are also produced, such as the North East England specialty called a stottie cake. A cob is a small, round loaf. A cottage loaf is made of two balls of dough, one on top of the other, to form a figure-of-eight shape. There are many variations on bread rolls, such as baps, barms, breadcakes, and so on. The Chorleywood process for mass-producing bread was developed in England in the 1960s before spreading worldwide. Mass-produced sliced white bread brands such as Wonderloaf and Mother's Pride have been criticized for poor nutritional value and the taste of their loaves.

In Spain, the traditional bread is in a long loaf, similar to the French baguette but wider. One can buy freshly made bread every morning at traditional bakeries, which offer a large assortment of bread. A smaller version is known as bocadillo, an iconic dish in Hispanic cuisine. In Spain, especially in the Mediterranean region, bakers' guilds have existed for over 750 years. The bakers guild in Barcelona was founded in 1200 AD. There is a region called Tierra del Pan ("Land of the Bread"), located in the province of Zamora, where the economy was in the past joined to this activity.

According to Guinness World Records, Turkey has the largest per capita consumption of bread in the world as of 2000, with 199.6 kg (440 lb) per person; Turkey is followed in bread consumption by Serbia and Montenegro with 135 kg (297 lb 9.9 oz), and Bulgaria with 133.1 kg (293 lb 6.9 oz).

=== Latin America ===
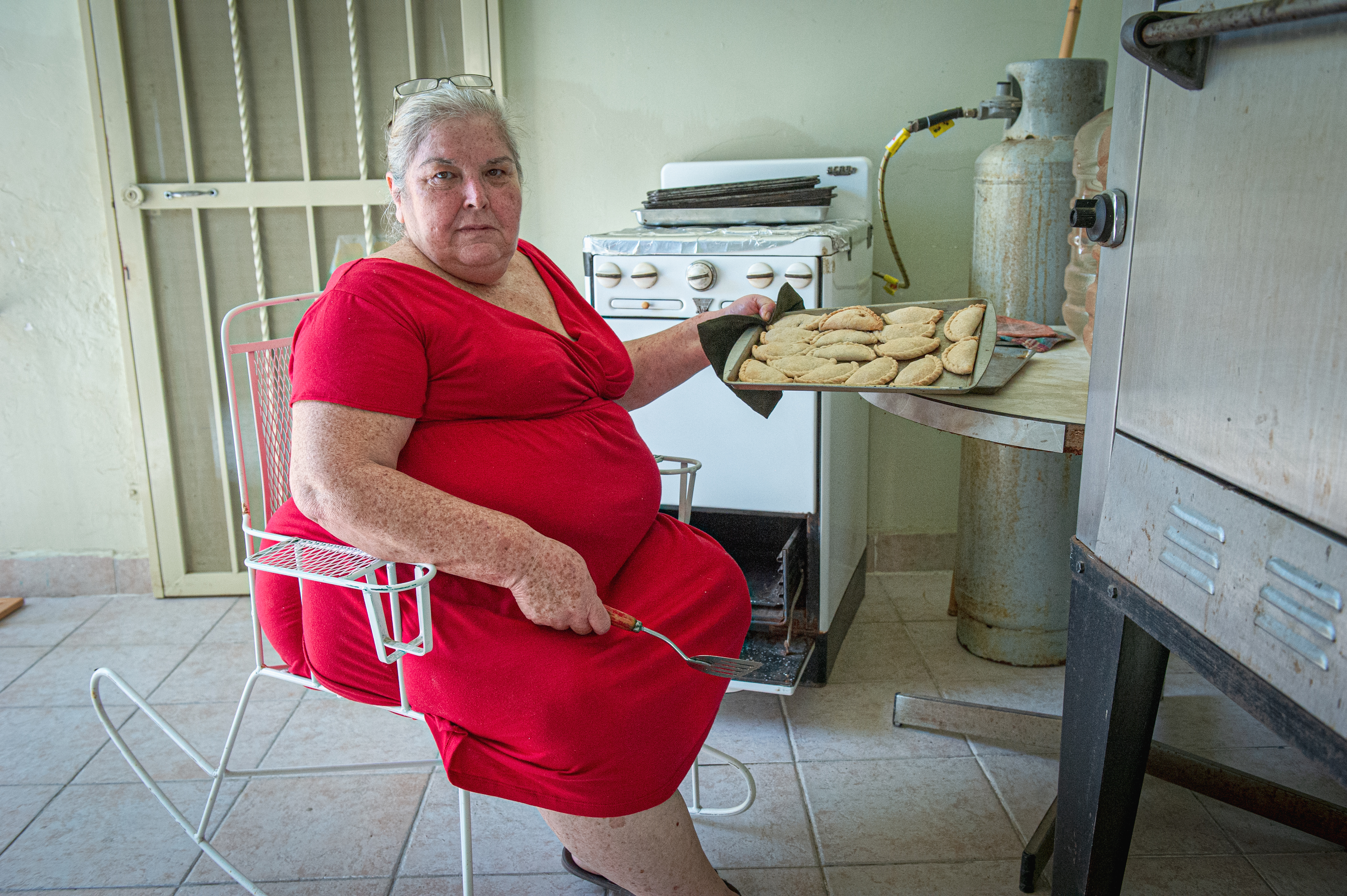
Guadalupe Rodrigues Rios at Ramones Bakery, Nuevo León, Mexico

Flat breads of many flours are widespread in Latin America, the most common probably being sopaipillas. Chile is the second largest consumer of bread per capita worldwide.

Corn tortillas are the staple bread in most of Mexico, and bread rolls in a wide variety are an important daily food for city dwellers. Popular breads in Mexico include the bolillo roll and pan dulce. Pan dulce, which is Spanish for "sweet bread", is eaten in the evenings with hot drinks like traditional hot chocolate.

Chapati breads are common in the Caribbean Islands and Guiana.

In Peru, bread comes in a wide variety due to the diversity of Peruvian cuisine. People usually eat pan de piso and pan serrano. There are also some kinds of bread made of potatoes; these are currently popular in the Andes. Bizcochos are sweet bread usually eaten with some butter and hot chocolate. A dough made with cooked pumpkin or squash, often shaped into doughnuts and fried, and served with a sweet, fruity dipping sauce, is a traditional favorite. Bread is an ingredient in sopas de ajo, gazpacho, and salmorejo.

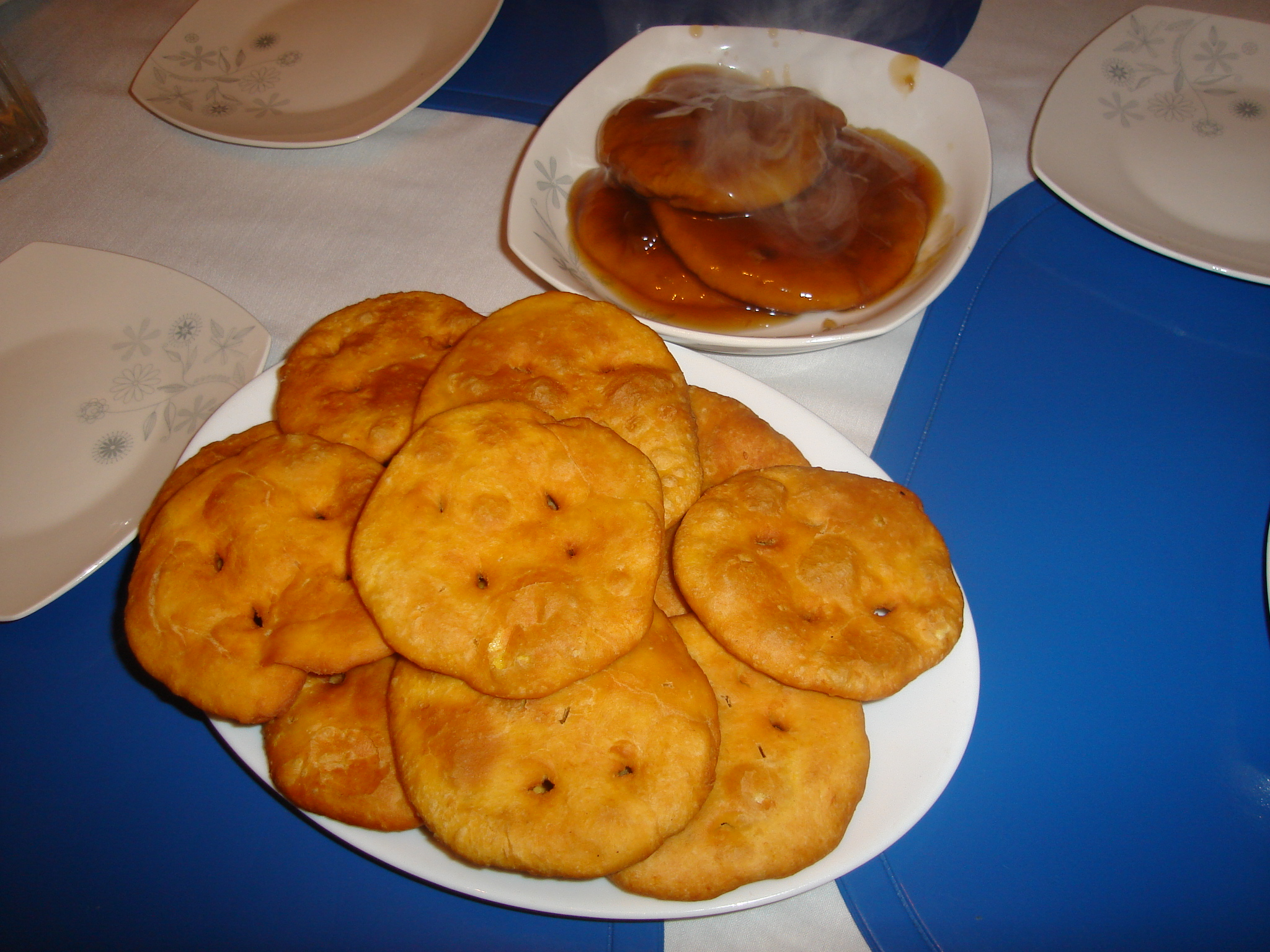
Central Chilean sopaipillas pasadas (soaked), and without chancaca sauce

In Colombia and Venezuela, arepas are a common type of bread made with corn flour, usually filled to create a variety of sandwiches. Arepa de huevo is a type of arepa from the Caribbean coast of Colombia.

Many breads in Paraguay, Brazil and Northeast of Argentina are made with flour and cheese, like chipa, sopa paraguaya and pão de queijo.

In the Rio de la Plata region sopaipillas are called torta frita and are fried in cow fat, other type of bread that is commonly found is galleta de campaña, a grease dough made of layers, roscas are a type of bread in Uruguay that is commonly eaten on semana santa (Easter), they are usually filled either with chicharrones or quince cheese. Pan de miga is a bread that is specially made for making sandwiches de miga and mostly is not consumed in any other way, similar to pebetes that are commonly filled with ham and cheese. A type of croissant commonly found in Rio de la plata is Medialuna.

=== North Africa and Horn of Africa ===
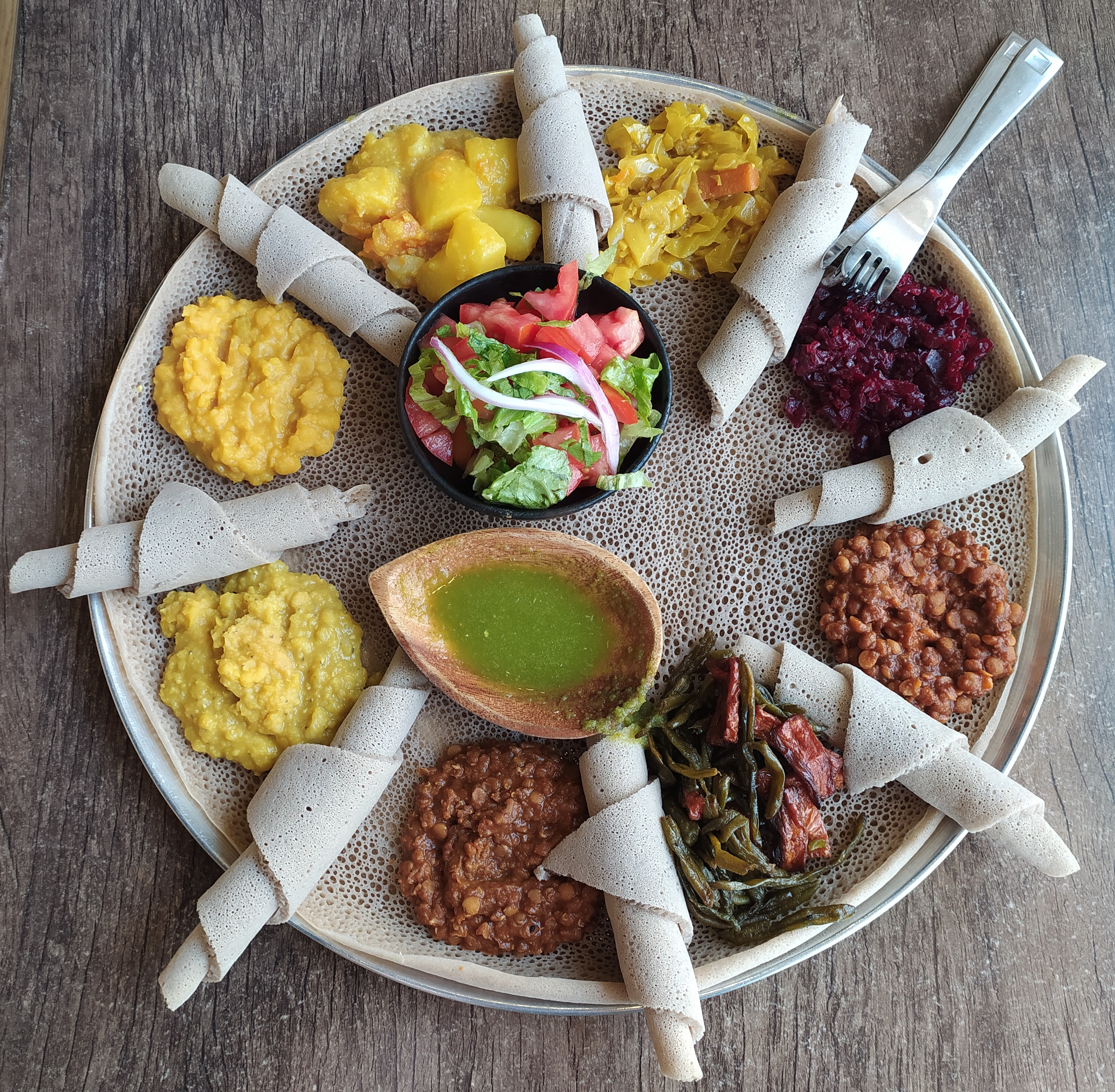
Meal consisting of injera and several kinds of wat or tsebhi (stew) or (maraq), typical of Ethiopian cuisine, Eritrean cuisine and Somali cuisine

In the Horn of Africa, notably Ethiopia and Eritrea, a bread called injera is made from a grain called teff. This is a wide, flat, circular bread that is in a similar shape of a tortilla and is also used as a utensil to pick up food.

Also consumed is a thick, chewy fried bread smothered in oil beforehand. The rghifa bread is a staple of Moroccan cuisine and consists of several layers of lightly cooked bread.

In Egypt, bread is called aysh (aish merahrah or aish baladi) and the ancient proverb has it that "life without aysh is not life". The typical Egyptian bread is circular, about 6 inches across, often baked in small neighborhood bakeries and bought still warm.

=== North America ===
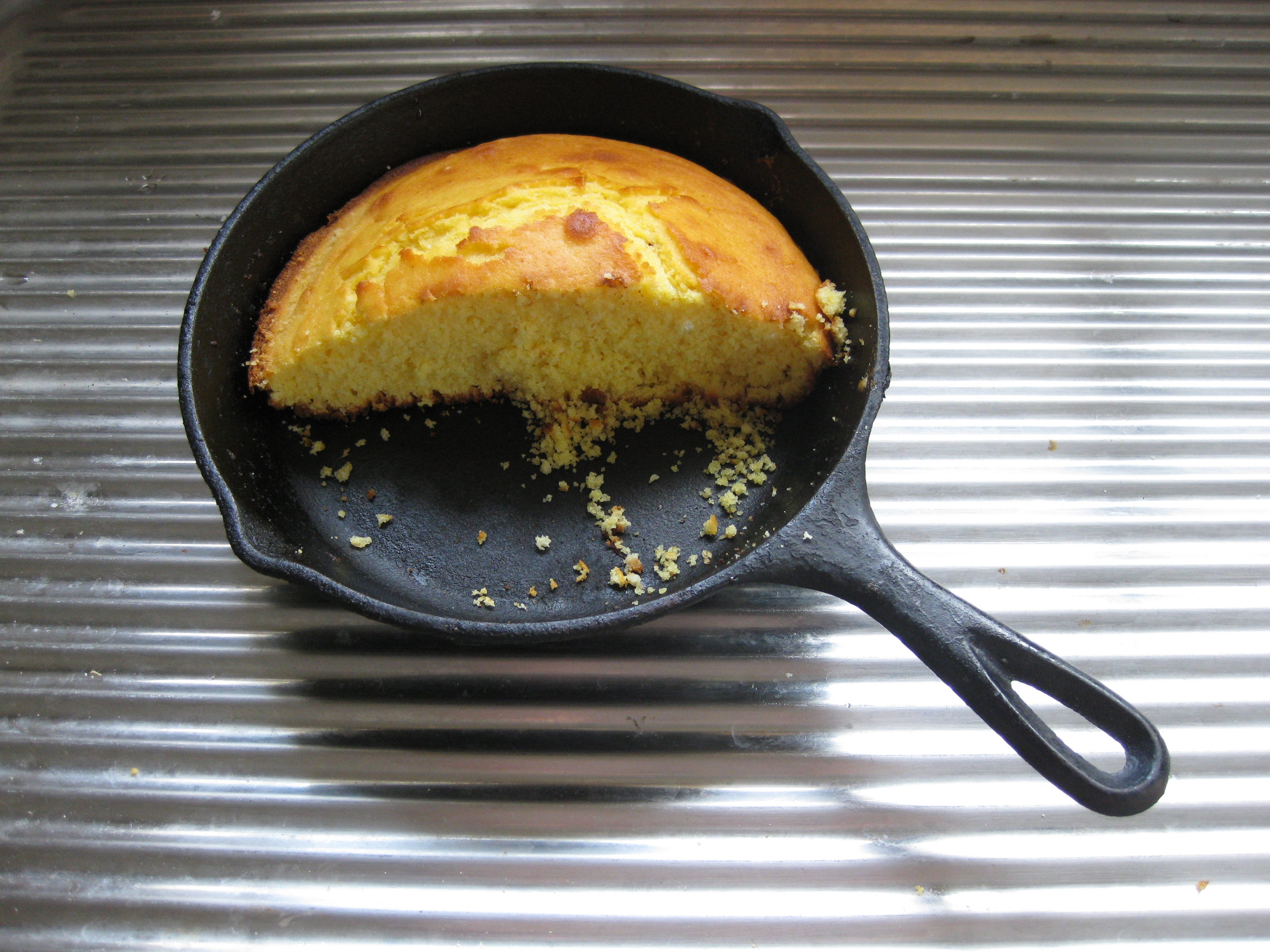
Cornbread is a popular Native American cuisine.

Traditional breads in the United States include cornbreads and various quick breads, such as biscuits. Rolls, made from wheat flour and yeast, are another popular and traditional bread eaten with dinner.

Cornbread is made from cornmeal and can differ significantly in taste and texture from region to region. In general, the South prefers white cornmeal with little to no wheat flour or sweeteners added; it is traditionally baked in a cast-iron skillet and ideally has a crunchy exterior and a moist interior. The North usually prefers yellow cornmeal with sometimes as much as half wheat flour in its composition, as well as sugar, honey, or maple syrup. This results in a bread that is softer and sweeter than its southern counterpart. Wheat flour was not available to the average North American family until the early 1900s, when a new breed of wheat, known as Marquis, was developed. This was a hybrid of Red Fife and Hard red winter wheat. Marquis grew well, and soon, average Americans were able to have homemade wheat bread on the table. Homemade wheat breads are made in a rectangular tin similar to those in the United Kingdom.

Spoon bread, also called batter bread or egg bread, is made of cornmeal with or without added rice and hominy, and is mixed with milk, eggs, shortening, and leavening to such a consistency that it must be served from the baking dish with a spoon. This is popular chiefly in the South.

Sourdough biscuits are traditional "cowboy food" in the West. The San Francisco Bay Area is known for its crusty sourdough.

Up until the 20th century (and even later in certain regions), any flour other than cornmeal was considered a luxury; this would help explain the greater variety of cornbread types compared to wheat breads. In commercial manufacture, the most popular bread has been a soft-textured type with a thin crust, usually made with milk and slightly sweet; this is the type generally sold ready-sliced in packages. It is usually eaten with the crust, but some eaters or preparers may remove it for personal preference or serving style, as with finger sandwiches served with afternoon tea. Some of the softest bread, including Wonder Bread, is referred to as "balloon bread".

Though white "sandwich bread" is the most popular, Americans are trending toward more artisanal breads. Different regions of the country feature certain ethnic bread varieties including the Ashkenazi Jewish bagel, the French baguette, the Italian-style scali bread made in New England, Jewish rye, commonly associated with delicatessen cuisine, and Native American frybread (a product of hardship, developed during the Indian resettlements of the 19th century).

== Religious significance ==
=== Abrahamic religions ===
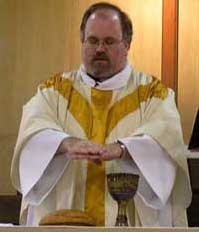
The Eucharist (also called Holy Communion or the Lord's Supper) is considered a sacrament, ordinance, or equivalent in most Christian denominations.

Bread has symbolic roles in the Abrahamic religions of Judaism and Christianity and Islam.

During the Jewish festival of Passover, only unleavened bread is eaten, in commemoration of the flight from slavery in Egypt. The Israelites did not have enough time to allow their bread to rise, and so ate only unleavened bread matzo. Challah is a traditional Jewish bread eaten for Shabbat and holidays (except fast days), based on the ancient practice of the dough offering to kohanim (priests).

In the Christian ritual of the Eucharist, bread is eaten as a sacrament either as a symbolic representation of the body of Christ or, as in the Catholic liturgy, as a real manifestation of the body of Christ. Specific aspects of the ritual itself, including the composition of the bread, vary from denomination to denomination. The differences in the practice of the Eucharist stem from different descriptions and depictions of the Last Supper, which provides the scriptural basis for the Eucharist. The Synoptic Gospels present the Last Supper as a Passover meal and suggest that the bread at the Last Supper would be unleavened. However, in the chronology in Gospel of John, the Last Supper occurred the day before Passover, suggesting that the bread would be leavened. Despite this point of disagreement, the Council of Florence of the Catholic church agreed that "the body of Christ is truly confected in both unleavened and leavened wheat bread, and priests should confect the body of Christ in either".

=== Paganism ===
Some traditions of Wicca and Neo-Paganism consume bread as part of their religious rituals, attaching varied symbolism to the act.

== Anti-bread movements ==
Some have rejected bread entirely or rejected types of bread that they consider unhealthy. Reasons for doing so have varied throughout history: whole-grain bread has been criticized as unrefined, and white bread as unhealthfully processed; homemade bread has been deemed unsanitary, and factory-made bread has been regarded with suspicion as adulterated. Amylophobia, literally "fear of starch", was a movement in the US during the 1920s and 1930s.

In the United States, bread sales fell by 11.3% between 2008 and 2013. This statistic might reflect a change in the types of food from which Americans are getting their carbohydrates, but the trends are unclear because of the concurrent effects of the Great Recession. The bread market remains challenging. Food Business News, 17 September 2013 It is also possible that changing diet fashions affected the decrease in bread sales during that period.

== In medicine ==
The ancient Egyptians used moldy bread to treat infections caused by dirt in burn wounds. In the early 20th century, penicillin was isolated from molds growing on bread, and became one of the most important antibiotics in use.

== See also ==
- Baking § Cultural and religious significance
- History of bread
- Spanish bread culture
