= European New Zealanders =

New Zealanders of European descent

Pākehā (Māori)
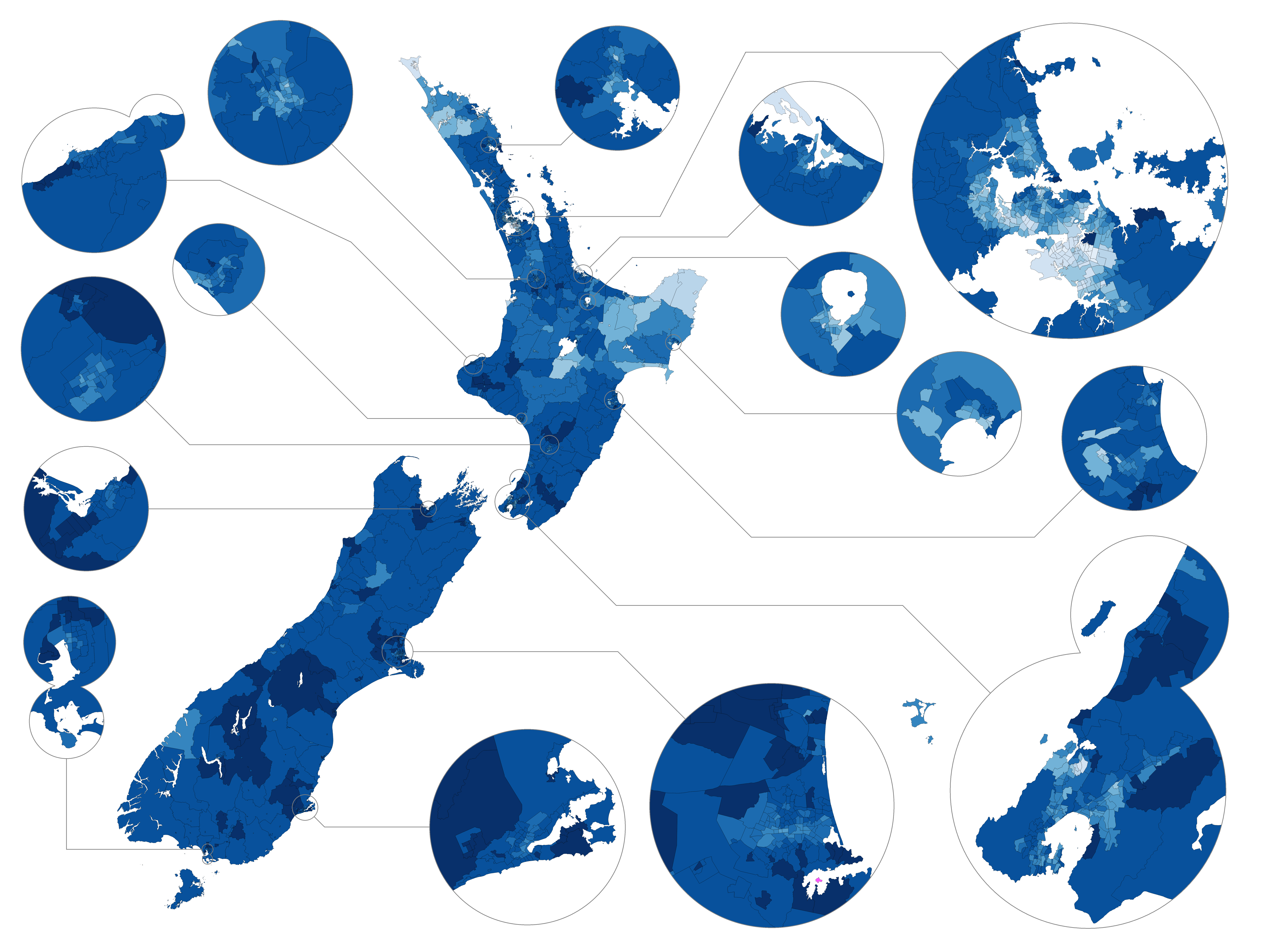

Total population
- 3,383,742 (2023 census); 67.8% of New Zealand's population

Regions with significant populations
- All regions of New Zealand

Languages
- Primarily English; NZSL

Religion
- Predominantly: Non-religious; Historically or Traditionally Christianity (Anglicanism, Catholicism, Presbyterianism), Judaism

Related ethnic groups
- European Australians, European Canadians, European Americans, White Argentines, White Americans, Uruguayan, White Africans, British (English · Scottish · Ulster Scots · Welsh), Irish, other European peoples

New Zealanders of European descent are mostly of British and Irish ancestry, with significantly smaller percentages of other European ancestries such as Germans, Poles, (Note: Historically noted as German due to Partitions of Poland) French, Dutch, Croats and other South Slavs, European Greeks, and Scandinavians. European New Zealanders are also known by the Māori-language loanword Pākehā.

Statistics New Zealand maintains the national classification standard for ethnicity. European is one of the six top-level ethnic groups, alongside Māori, Pacific (Pasifika), Asian, Middle Eastern/Latin American/African (MELAA), and Other.Within the top-level European group are two second-level ethnic groups, New Zealand European and Other European. New Zealand European consists of New Zealanders of European descent, while Other European consists of migrant European ethnic groups. Other Europeans also includes some people of indirect European descent, including Americans, Canadians, South Africans and Australians.

According to the 2018 New Zealand census, 3,372,708 people (70.2%) identified as European, with 3,013,440 people (64%) identifying as New Zealand European.

== History ==
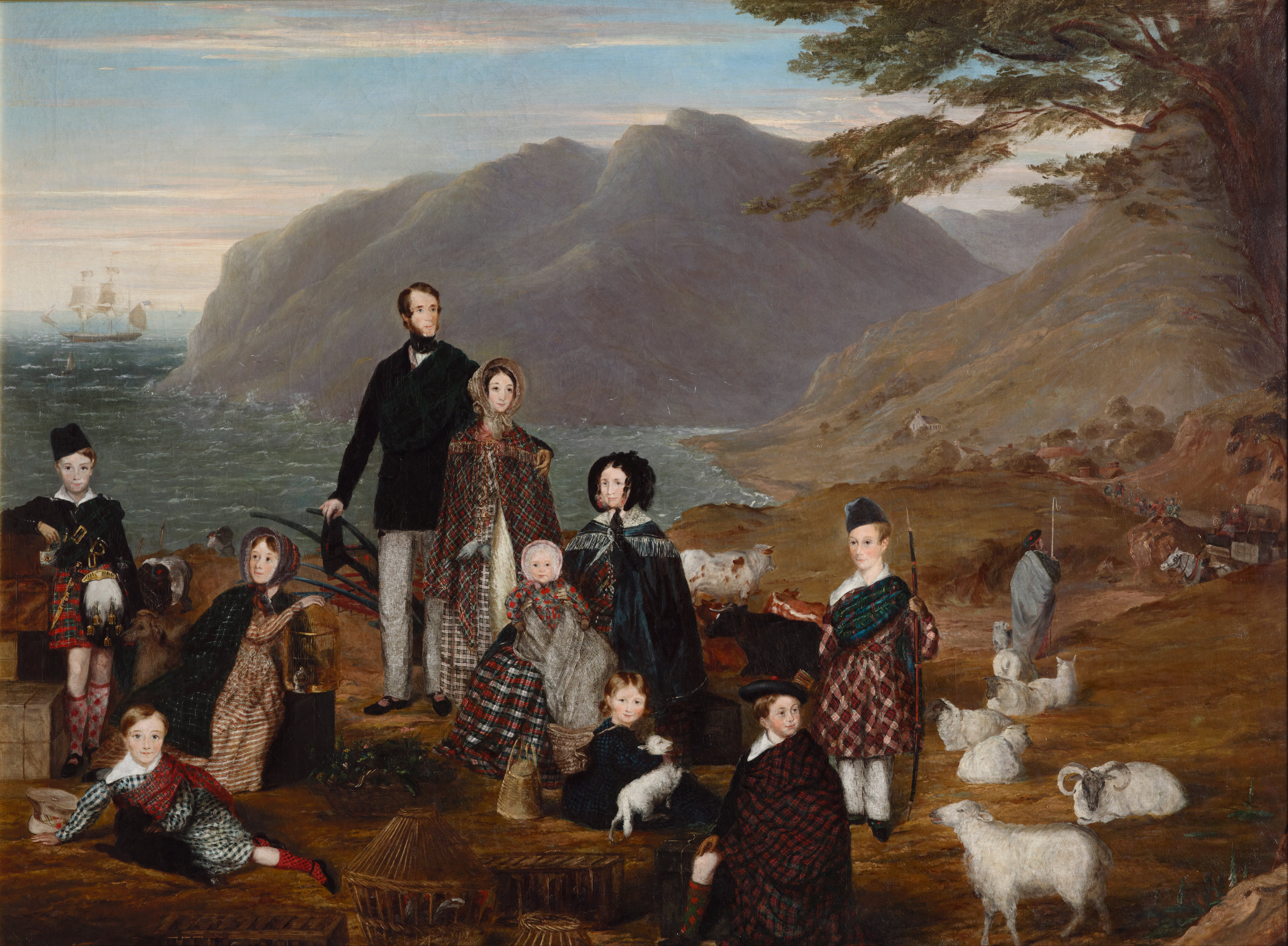
Scottish Highland family preparing to embark for New Zealand in 1844

British Captain James Cook sailed to New Zealand in 1769. Prior to him was Dutchman Abel Tasman in 1642. The establishment of British colonies in Australia from 1788 and the boom in whaling and sealing in the Southern Ocean brought many Europeans to the vicinity of New Zealand. Whalers and sealers were often itinerant and the first real settlers were missionaries and traders in the Bay of Islands area from 1809. Some of the early visitors stayed and lived with Māori tribes as Pākehā Māori. Often whalers and traders married Māori women of high status which served to cement trade and political alliances as well as bringing wealth and prestige to the tribe. By 1830 there was a population of about 800 non-Māori which included a total of about 200 runaway convicts and seamen. The seamen often lived in New Zealand for a short time before joining another ship a few months later.

In 1839 there were 1100 Europeans living in the North Island. Violence against European shipping (mainly due to mutual cultural misunderstandings), the ongoing musket wars between Māori tribes (due to the recent relatively sudden introduction of firearms into the Māori world), cultural barriers and the lack of an established European law and order made settling in New Zealand a risky prospect. By the late 1830s the average missionary would claim that many Māori were nominally Christian; many of the Māori slaves that had been captured during the Musket Wars had been freed, and cannibalism had been largely stamped out. By this time many Māori, especially in the north, could read and write in their native language and to a lesser extent English.

=== 1840 onwards ===
Europe-born population of New Zealand 1858–2013 % of total overseas born
Year	Born in Europe		Born in UK & Ireland		Refs
1858			36,443		
1881			223,303	86.3%	
1961	265,660	78.4%	227,459	67.2%	
1971	298,283	72.4%	255,408	62.0%	
1981	298,251	66.1%	257,589	57.1%	
1986			255,756	53.0%	
1991	285,555	54.7%	239,157	45.8%	
1996			230,049	38.0%	
2001	279,015	40.6%	221,010	32.1%	
2006			251,688	28.6%	
2013	336,636	32.6%	265,206	25.7%	

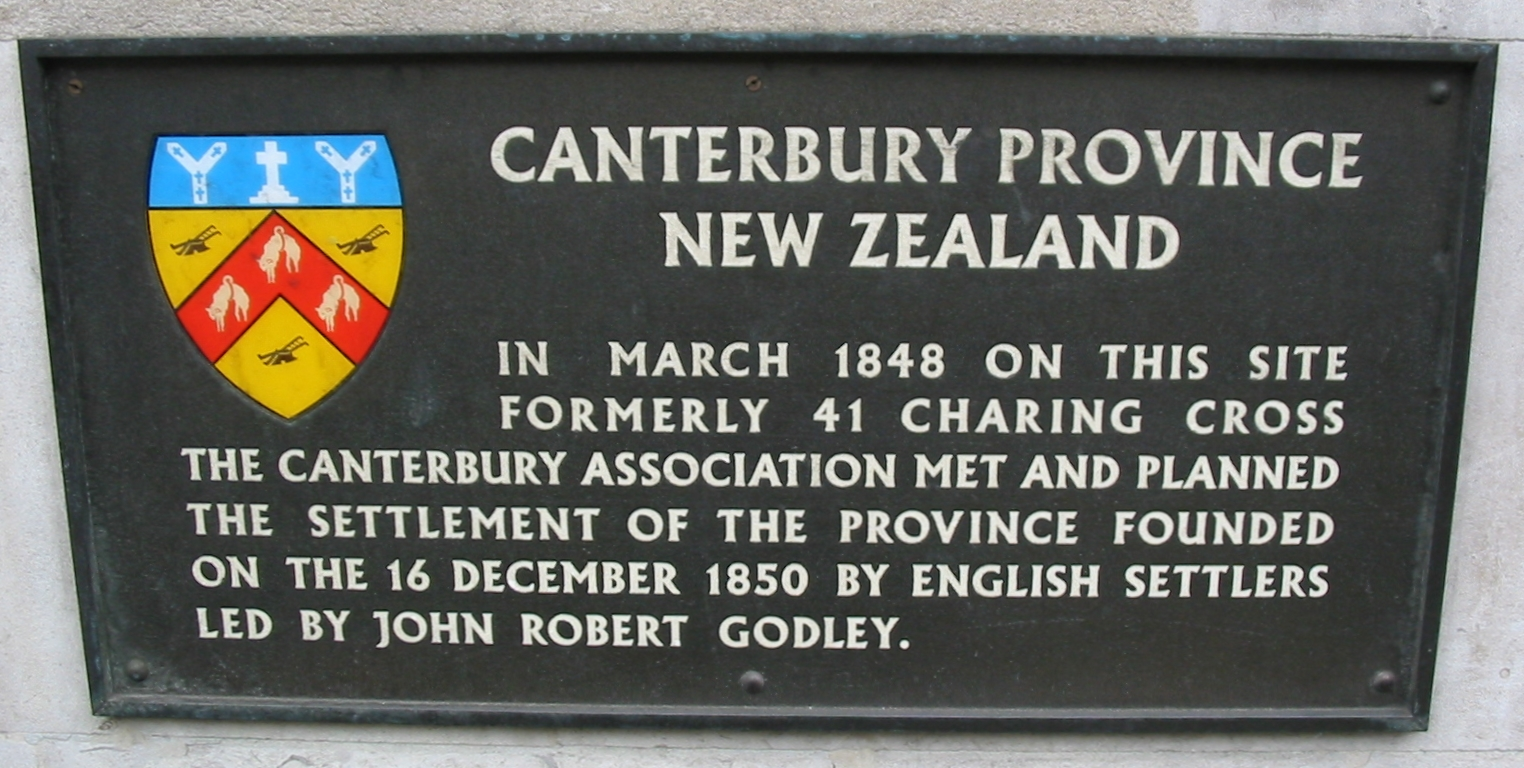
Plaque commemorating the first meeting of the Canterbury Association in Charing Cross, London. The association would go on to found Canterbury, New Zealand, in 1850.

European migration has left a deep legacy on the social and political structures of New Zealand. Early visitors to New Zealand included whalers, sealers, missionaries, mariners, and merchants, attracted to natural resources in abundance. They came from the Australian colonies, Great Britain and Ireland, Germany (forming the next biggest immigrant group after the British and Irish), France, Portugal, the Netherlands, Denmark, the United States, and Canada.

In 1840 representatives of the British Crown signed the Treaty of Waitangi with 240 Māori chiefs throughout New Zealand, motivated by plans for a French colony at Akaroa and land purchases by the New Zealand Company in 1839. British sovereignty was then proclaimed over New Zealand in May 1840. Some would later argue that the proclamation of sovereignty was in direct conflict with the treaty, which in its Māori version had guaranteed sovereignty (rangatiratanga) to the Māori who signed it. By the end of the 1850s the European and Māori populations were of a similar size as immigration and natural increase boosted European numbers.

Following the formalising of British sovereignty, the organised and structured flow of migrants from Great Britain and Ireland began. Government-chartered ships like the clipper Gananoque and the Glentanner carried immigrants to New Zealand. Typically clipper ships left British ports such as London and travelled south through the central Atlantic to about 43 degrees south to pick up the strong westerly winds that carried the clippers well south of South Africa and Australia. Ships would then head north once in the vicinity of New Zealand. The Glentanner migrant ship of 610 tonnes made two runs to New Zealand and several to Australia carrying 400 tonne of passengers and cargo. Travel time was about 3 to 3 1/2 months to New Zealand. Cargo carried on the Glentanner for New Zealand included coal, slate, lead sheet, wine, beer, cart components, salt, soap and passengers' personal goods. On the 1857 passage the ship carried 163 official passengers, most of them government assisted. On the return trip the ship carried a wool cargo worth 45,000 pounds.

In the 1860s discovery of gold started a gold rush in Otago. By 1860 more than 100,000 British and Irish settlers lived throughout New Zealand. The Otago Association actively recruited settlers from Scotland, creating a definite Scottish influence in that region, while the Canterbury Association recruited settlers from the south of England, creating a definite English influence over that region. In the 1860s most migrants settled in the South Island due to gold discoveries and the availability of flat grass-covered land for pastoral farming. The low number of Māori (about 2,000) and the absence of warfare gave the South Island many advantages. It was only when the New Zealand wars ended that the North Island again became an attractive destination.

In the 1870s the MP Julius Vogel borrowed millions of pounds from Britain to help fund capital development such as a nationwide rail system, lighthouses, ports and bridges, and encouraged mass migration from Britain. By 1870 the non-Māori population reached over 250,000. Other smaller groups of settlers came from Germany, Scandinavia, and other parts of Europe as well as from China and India, but British and Irish settlers made up the vast majority, and did so for the next 150 years.

Greek New Zealanders began arriving between 1890 and 1914, before a surge in chain migration after the Second World War. Significant numbers emigrated from indigenous communities outside Greece. Many in the postwar period were not European, having come from Egypt, Cyprus, Turkey, and across the former Ottoman Empire. Greek Cypriot arrivals increased significantly after the Turkish invasion of Cyprus in 1974.

== Demographics ==
European New Zealanders from 2006 to 2018

European New Zealanders by census Statistics New Zealand
Year	Population	%	Ref(s)	Year	Population	%	Ref(s)
1851	26,707	–		1966	2,426,352	90.6 ▼	
1881	489,933	–		1971	2,561,280	89.5 ▼	
1916	1,093,024	95.1		2001	2,871,432	80.06 ▼	
1921	1,209,239	95.1		2006	2,609,589	67.6 ▼	
1926	1,338,167	95.0 ▼		2013	2,969,391	74.0 ▲	
1936	1,484,508	94.3 ▼		2018	3,297,864	70.2 ▼	
1945	1,592,908	93.6 ▼		2023	3,383,742	67.8 ▼	
1951	1,809,441	93.3 ▼					
1956	2,016,287	92.7 ▼					
1961	2,216,886	91.8 ▼					

European New Zealanders population pyramid in 2018

There were 3,383,742 people identifying as being part of the European ethnic group at the 2023 New Zealand census, making up 67.8% of New Zealand's population. This is an increase of 85,878 people (2.6%) since the 2018 census, and an increase of 414,351 people (14.0%) since the 2013 census. The median age was 41.7 years, compared with 38.1 years for New Zealand as a whole. 604,404 people (17.9%) were aged under 15 years, 612,864 (18.1%) were 15 to 29, 1,477,293 (43.7%) were 30 to 64, and 689,187 (20.4%) were 65 or older.

At the 2018 census, there were 1,614,807 males and 1,683,054 females, giving a sex ratio of 0.959 males per female.

In terms of population distribution, 2,401,983 (71.0%) Europeans at the 2023 census lived in the North Island and 981,279 (29.0%) lived in the South Island. The Waimakariri district had the highest concentration of Europeans at 92.1%, followed by the Carterton district (91.2%), the Tasman district and the Grey district (both 90.7%). Europeans are a minority in three districts: the Auckland region (49.8%), Ōpōtiki district (49.7%), and Wairoa district (46.9%). Within Auckland, ten of the 21 local board areas have a minority European population: Ōtara-Papatoetoe (14.6%), Māngere-Ōtāhuhu (18.4%), Manurewa (24.5%), Puketāpapa (32.1%), Papakura (36.7%), Whau (37.6%), Howick (38.1%), Maungakiekie-Tāmaki (42.2%), Henderson-Massey (43.6%), and Upper Harbour (49.1%).

The first general Census of New Zealand population was taken November–December 1851. Subsequent censuses were taken in 1858, 1861, 1864, 1867, 1871, 1874, 1878 and 1881 and thereafter at five-yearly intervals until 1926. The table shows the ethnic composition of New Zealand population at each census since the early twentieth century. Europeans are still the largest ethnic group in New Zealand. Their proportion of the total New Zealand population has been decreasing gradually since the 1916 Census.

The 2006 Census counted 2,609,592 European New Zealanders. Most census reports do not separate European New Zealanders from the broader European ethnic category, which was the largest broad ethnic category in the 2006 Census. Europeans comprised 67.6 percent of respondents in 2006 compared with 80.1 percent in the 2001 census.

The apparent drop in this figure was due to Statistics New Zealand's acceptance of 'New Zealander' as a distinct response to the ethnicity question and their placement of it within the "Other" ethnic category, along with an email campaign asking people to give it as their ethnicity in the 2006 Census.

In previous censuses, these responses were counted belonging to the European New Zealanders group, and Statistics New Zealand plans to return to this approach for the 2011 Census. Eleven percent of respondents identified as New Zealanders in the 2006 Census (or as something similar, e.g. "Kiwi"), well above the trend observed in previous censuses, and higher than the percentage seen in other surveys that year.

In April 2009, Statistics New Zealand announced a review of their official ethnicity standard, citing this debate as a reason, and a draft report was released for public comment. In response, the New Zealand Herald opined that the decision to leave the question unchanged in 2011 and rely on public information efforts was "rather too hopeful", and advocated a return to something like the 1986 approach. This asked people which of several identities "apply to you", instead of the more recent question "What ethnic group do you belong to?"

Ethnic group (detailed) for usually resident population, 2013–23 Census
Ethnicity	Census		
Ethnicity	2013	2018	2023
New Zealand European	2,727,009	3,013,440	3,099,858
English	38,916	72,204	68,517
South African European	28,656	37,155	48,930
Dutch	28,503	29,820	30,948
Australian	22,467	29,349	30,591
European nfd	26,472	34,632	21,830
Irish	14,193	17,835	21,261
Scottish	14,412	18,627	19,767
American	12,339	16,245	18,606
German	12,810	16,818	17,565
British nfd	36,024	11,607	12,021
Russian	5,979	7,713	8,040
Canadian	5,871	7,797	8,910
French	4,593	7,677	8,451
Italian	3,798	5,352	6,444
Welsh	3,708	4,971	5,724
Croatian	2,673	2,946	3,609
European nec	2,685	1,978	2,562
Greek	2,478	2,475	2,823
Swiss	2,388	2,649	2,880
Polish	2,163	2,871	3,360
Spanish	2,043	2,733	3,162
Danish	1,989	2,214	2,496
Zimbabwean European	1,614	1,872	1,497
Romanian	1,452	1,485	1,437
Swedish	1,401	1,911	2,127
Hungarian	1,365	1,638	1,788
Afrikaner	1,197	789	6,069
Czech	1,083	1,740	1,953
Serbian	1,056	1,284	1,347
Austrian	1,029	1,272	1,338
Portuguese	942	1,365	1,746
Ukrainian	852	1,281	2,151
Norwegian	810	1,131	1,410
Total Europeans	2,969,391	3,297,864	3,383,742

- nfd – not further defined (insufficient data to classify the response further)
- nec – not elsewhere classified (no classification exists for the response)

== Alternative terms ==
=== Pākehā ===
The term Pākehā (or Pakeha), the etymology of which is unclear, is used interchangeably with European New Zealanders. The 1996 census used the wording "New Zealand European (Pākehā)" in the ethnicity question, however the word Pākehā was subsequently removed after what Statistics New Zealand called a "significant adverse reaction" to its use to identify ethnicity. In 2013, the New Zealand Attitudes and Values Study carried out by the University of Auckland found no evidence that the word was derogatory; 14% of the overall respondents to the survey chose the option Pākehā to describe themselves with the remainder preferring New Zealander, New Zealand European or Kiwi.

=== Palagi ===
The term Palagi, pronounced Palangi, is Samoan in origin and is used in similar ways to Pākehā, usually by people of Samoan or other Pacific Island descent.

=== British New Zealander ===
Historically, a sense of 'Britishness' has figured prominently in the identity of many New Zealanders. As late as the 1950s it was common for New Zealanders to refer to themselves as British, such as when Prime Minister Keith Holyoake described Sir Edmund Hillary's successful ascent of Mount Everest as "[putting] the British race and New Zealand on top of the world". New Zealand passports described nationals as "British Subject and New Zealand Citizen" until 1974, when this was changed to "New Zealand Citizen".

While a broader "European" ethnic grouping predominates political discourse in New Zealand today, the vast majority of European New Zealanders are of full or partial British ancestry, and some continue to self-identity as such. Others see the term as better describing previous generations; for instance, journalist Colin James referred to "we ex-British New Zealanders" in a 2005 speech. Nonetheless, it remains a relatively uncontroversial descriptor of ethnic origin amongst the wider population.

== Politics ==
=== Colonial period ===
As the earliest colonists of New Zealand, settlers from England and their descendants often held positions of power and made or helped make laws often because many had been involved in government back in England.

=== National founders ===
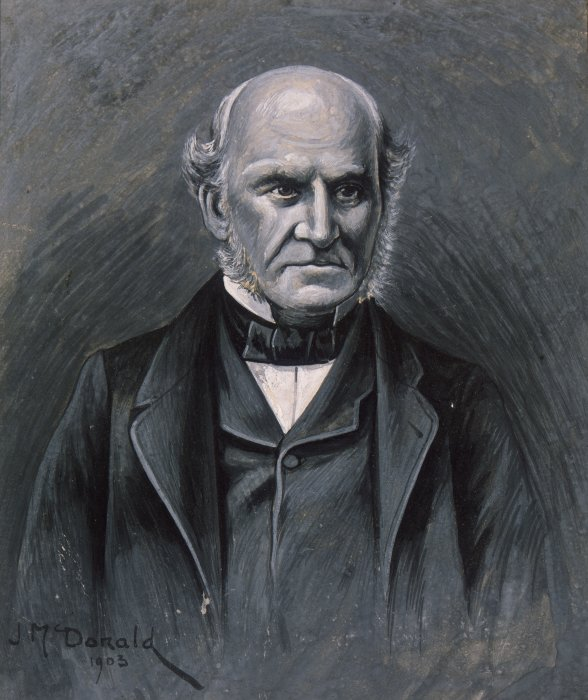
James Busby.

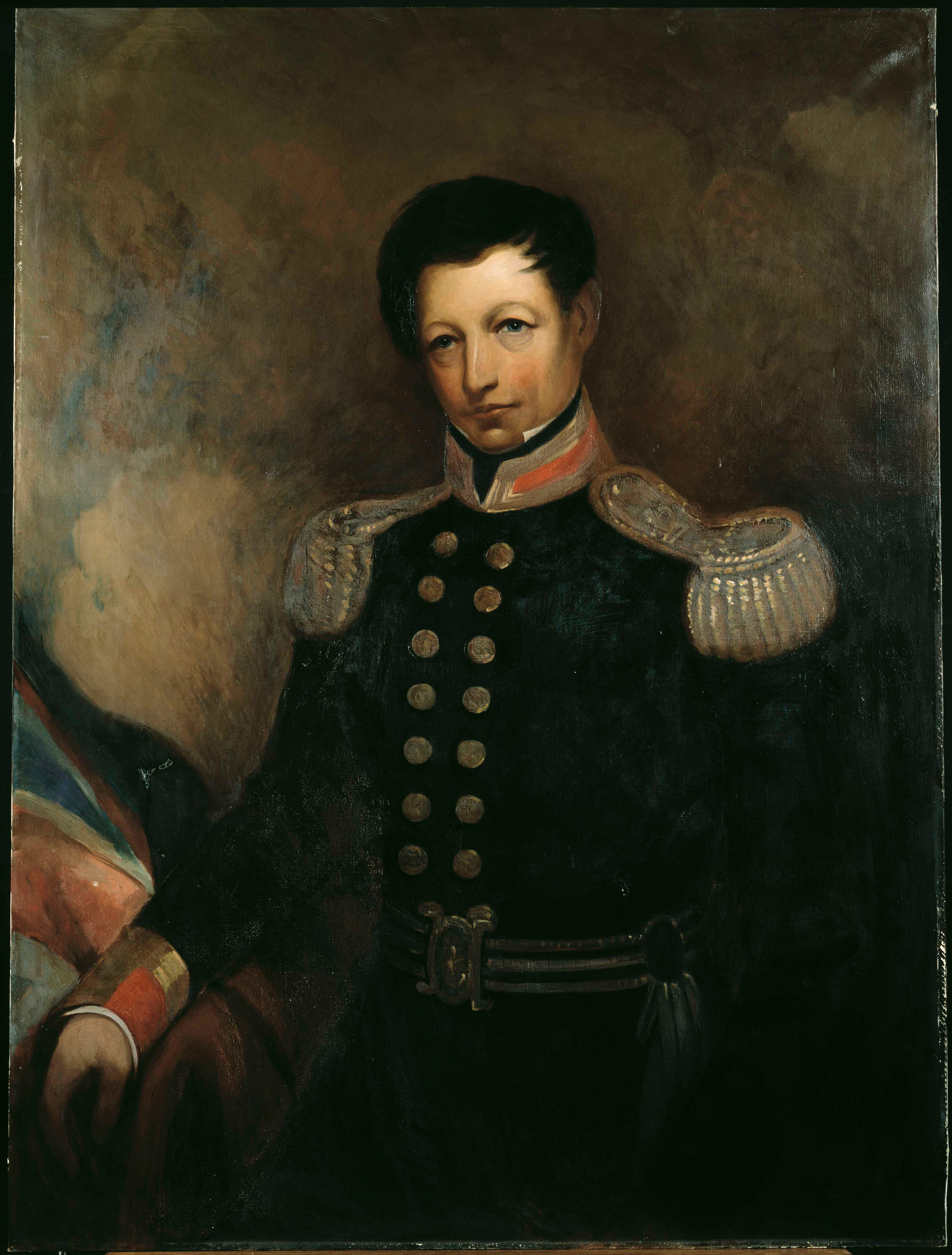
Captain William Hobson.

The lineage of most of the national founders of New Zealand was British (especially English) such as:

- James Busby (from Scotland with English and Scottish parents) drafted the Declaration of the Independence of New Zealand and, with William Hobson, co-authored the Treaty of Waitangi.
- Captain William Hobson (from Waterford, Ireland) is the principal author of the Treaty of Waitangi and the first governor of New Zealand.

Various other founders of New Zealand have also been unofficially recognised:

- Captain James Cook, the Englishman who voyaged to, and claimed New Zealand for the Crown.
- Captain Arthur Phillip (Englishman), first governor of New South Wales, founder of the first colony with nominal authority over all of Australia east of the 135th meridian, including all of New Zealand bar the southernmost part of South Island.
- Sir George Grey (English and Irish parents), the third governor of New Zealand and the eleventh New Zealand prime minister.
- Henry Sewell (English parents), the first New Zealand prime minister.

== Culture ==
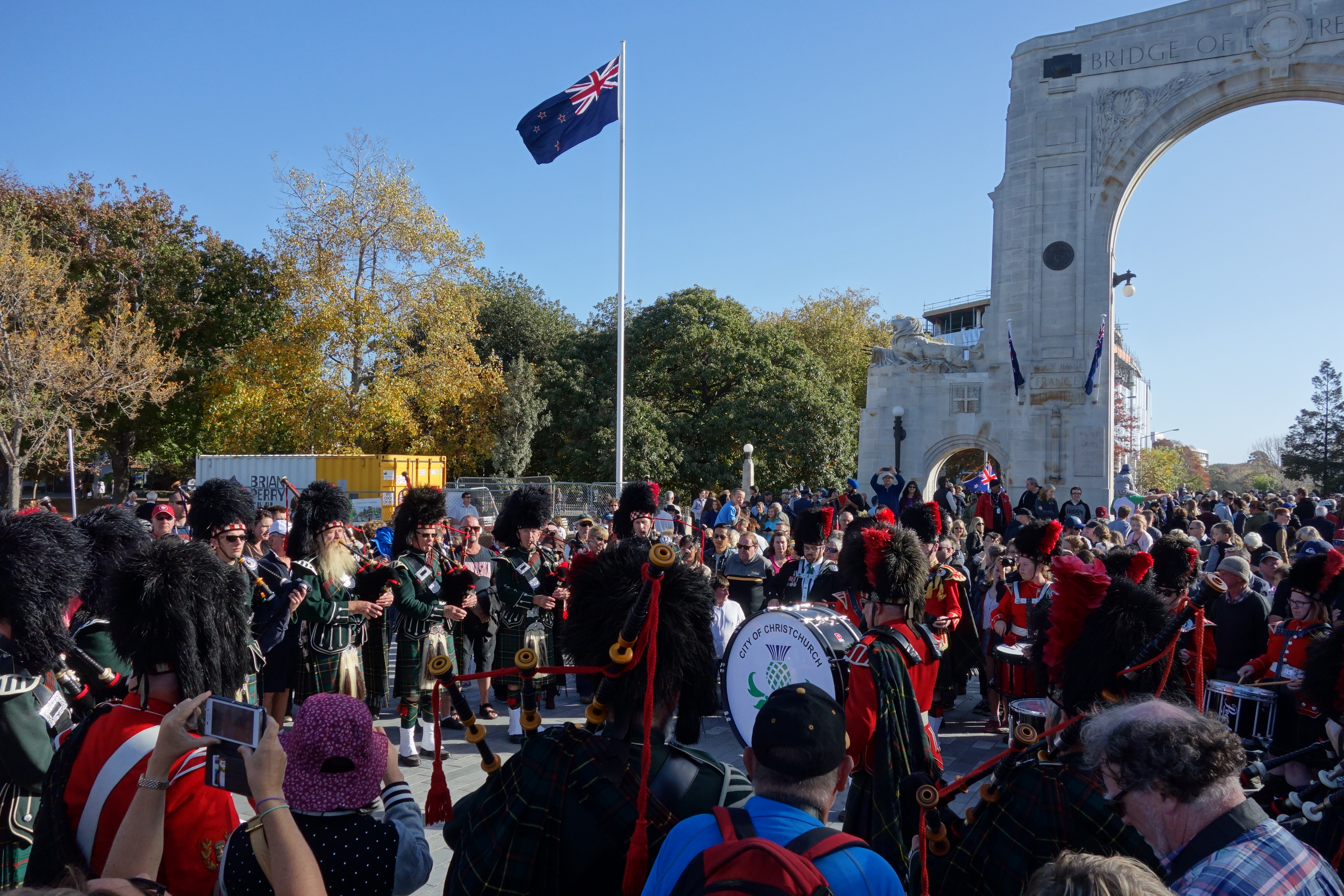
The New Zealand flag is raised in the Bridge of Remembrance during an Anzac Day parade in Christchurch, New Zealand.

The culture of New Zealand is essentially a Western culture influenced by the unique geography of New Zealand, the diverse input of Māori and other Pacific people, the British colonisation of New Zealand that began in 1840, and the various waves of multi-ethnic migration that followed. Evidence of a significant Anglo-Celtic heritage includes the predominance of the English language, the common law, the Westminster system of government, Christianity (Anglicanism) as the once dominant religion, and the popularity of British sports such as rugby and cricket; all of which are part of the heritage that has shaped modern New Zealand.

=== Distinctive identity ===
European settlement increased through the early decades of the 19th century, with numerous trading stations established, especially in the North. The experiences of European New Zealanders have endured in New Zealand music, cinema and literature. The early European settlers and later organised settlers identified themselves as the nationality of their former nations—typically British. Historian Fiona Barker states, "New Zealanders saw their country as playing a special role as a loyal member of the British Empire, and for a long time New Zealand aspired to be a ‘Britain of the South’." However, by the mid-20th century a distinctive identity had cemented.

Michael King, a leading writer and historian on Pākehā identity, discussed the concept of distinct European New Zealander practices and imaginations in his books: Being Pākehā (1985) and Being Pākehā Now (1999), and the edited collection, Pakeha: The Quest for Identity in New Zealand (1991), conceptualising Pākehā as New Zealand's "second indigenous" culture. By contrast, Māori art historian Jonathan Mane-Wheoki described Pākehā as "the people who define themselves by what they are not. Who want to forget their origins, their history, their cultural inheritance – who want Maori, likewise, to deny their origins so that we can all start off afresh."

Where Pākehā identity is located, commonly New Zealand kitsch and symbols from marketing such as the Chesdale Cheese men are used as signifiers, and might more appropriately be called "Kiwiana".

=== Language ===
New Zealand English is one of New Zealand's official languages and is the primary language of a majority of the population.

New Zealand English began to diverge from British English after the English language was established in New Zealand by colonists during the 19th century. The earliest form of New Zealand English was first spoken by the children of the colonists born into the Colony of New Zealand. These children were exposed to a great variety of mutually intelligible dialectal regions of the British Isles. This first generation of children created a new dialect from the speech they heard around them that quickly developed into a distinct variety of English. New Zealand English blunted new settlers' patterns of speech into it.

New Zealand English differs from other varieties of English in vocabulary, accent, pronunciation, register, grammar and spelling.

Other than English, the most commonly spoken European languages in New Zealand are French and German.

=== Music ===
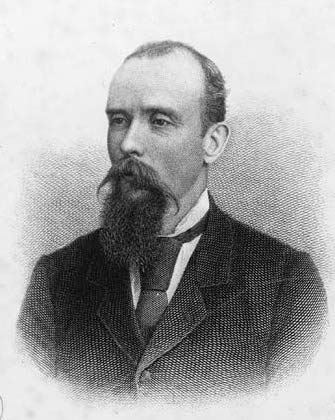
Thomas Bracken wrote the lyrics to God Defend New Zealand.

Another area of cultural influence are New Zealand Patriotic songs:

- "God Defend New Zealand" is a national anthem of New Zealand - Created by the Irish-born composer Thomas Bracken, the song was first performed in 1876, and was sung in New Zealand as a patriotic song. It has equal status with "God Save the King" but "God Defend New Zealand" is more commonly used. It did not gain its status as an official anthem until 1977, following a petition to Parliament asking "God Defend New Zealand" to be made the national anthem in 1976.
- "God Save the King" (or "God Save the Queen") - New Zealand's other official national anthem, and was the sole national anthem until 1977. "God Save the King/Queen" is also the national anthem of the United Kingdom and was adopted in 1745. It is now most often played only when the sovereign, Governor-General or other member of the Royal Family is present, or in other situations where a royal anthem would be used, or on some occasions such as Anzac Day.

=== Architecture ===
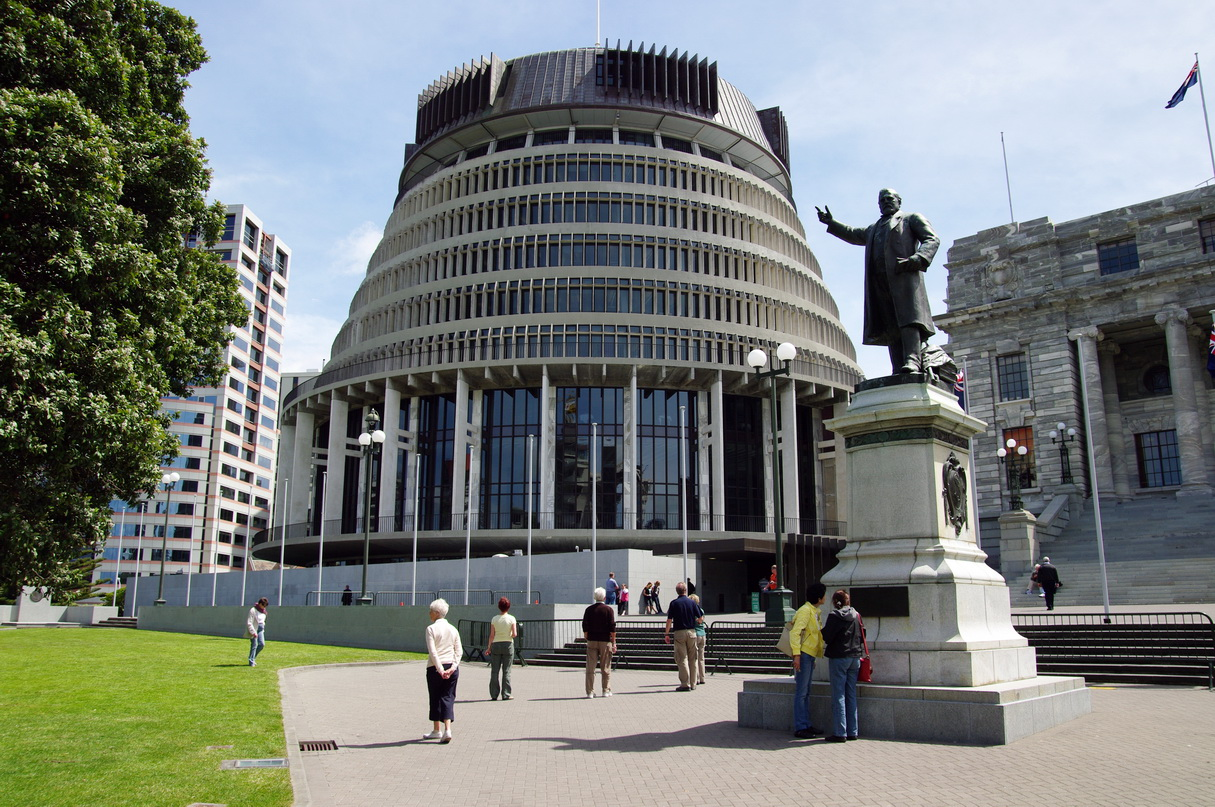
The Beehive is one of the most recognisable buildings in New Zealand, designed by Scottish architect Basil Spence.

Scottish architect Sir Basil Spence provided the original conceptual design of the Beehive in 1964. The detailed architectural design was undertaken by the New Zealand government architect Fergus Sheppard, and structural design of the building was undertaken by the Ministry of Works. The Beehive was built in stages between 1969 and 1979. W. M. Angus constructed the first stage - the podium, underground car park and basement for a national civil defence centre, and Gibson O'Connor constructed the ten floors of the remainder of the building. Bellamy's restaurant moved into the building in the summer of 1975–76 and Queen Elizabeth II, Queen of New Zealand, unveiled a plaque in the reception hall in February 1977. The Prime Minister, Robert Muldoon, formally opened the building in May 1977. The government moved into the upper floors in 1979. The annex facing Museum Street was completed in 1981. In July 2015, Heritage New Zealand declared the Beehive "of outstanding heritage significance for its central role in the governance of New Zealand".

Many of the more imposing structures in and around Dunedin and Christchurch were built in the latter part of the 19th century as a result of the economic boom following the Otago gold rush. A common style for these landmarks is the use of dark basalt blocks and facings of cream-coloured Oamaru stone, a form of limestone mined at Weston in North Otago. Notable buildings in this style include Dunedin Railway Station, the University of Otago Registry Building, Christchurch Arts Centre, Knox Church, Dunedin, Christ Church Cathedral, Christchurch, Christ's College, Christchurch, Garrison Hall, Dunedin, parts of the Canterbury Provincial Council Buildings and Otago Boys' High School.

=== Cuisine ===
Europeans have influenced New Zealand cuisine. Europeans introduced meats such beef, lamb, and pork, dairy such as cheese and milk, vegetables such as potatoes and carrots and sweet and savory puddings and pies. Boil up, kānga, paraoa are of European origin.

== Place names in New Zealand of European origin ==
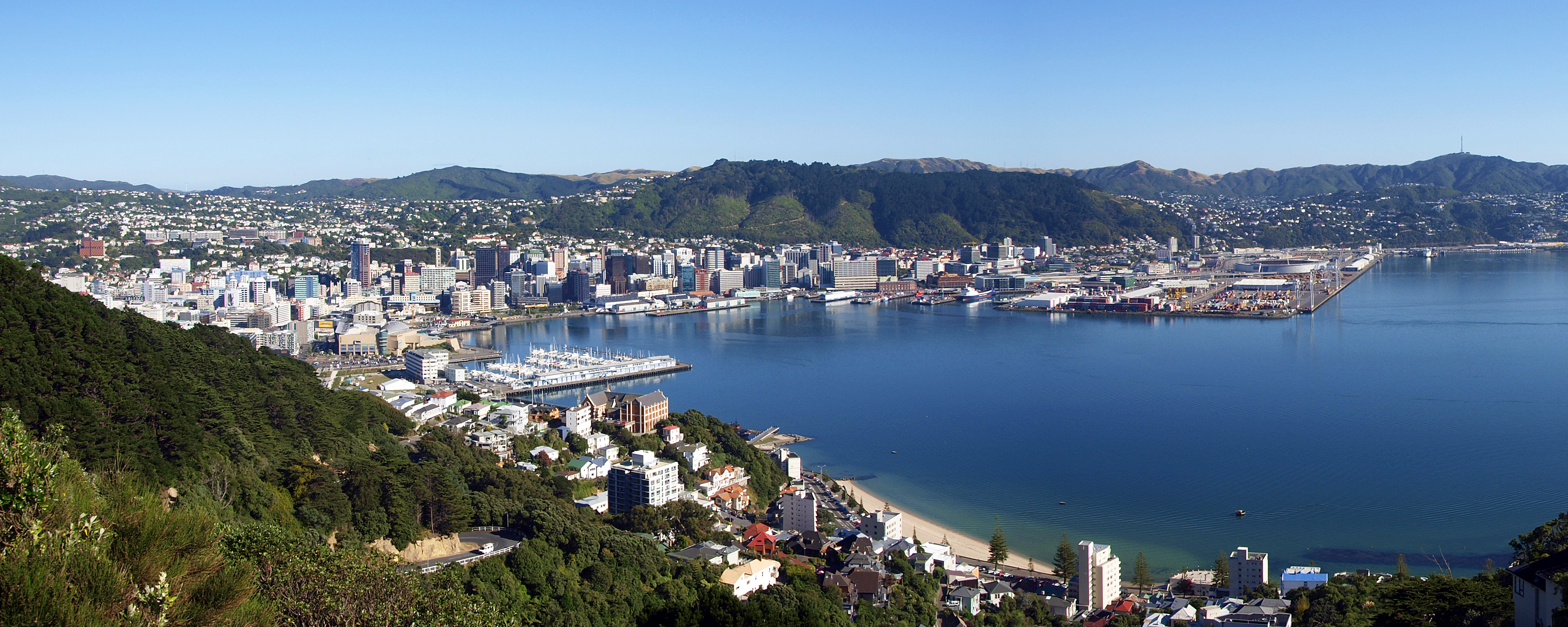
Wellington – named after Arthur Wellesley, 1st Duke of Wellington. His title comes from the town of Wellington, England.

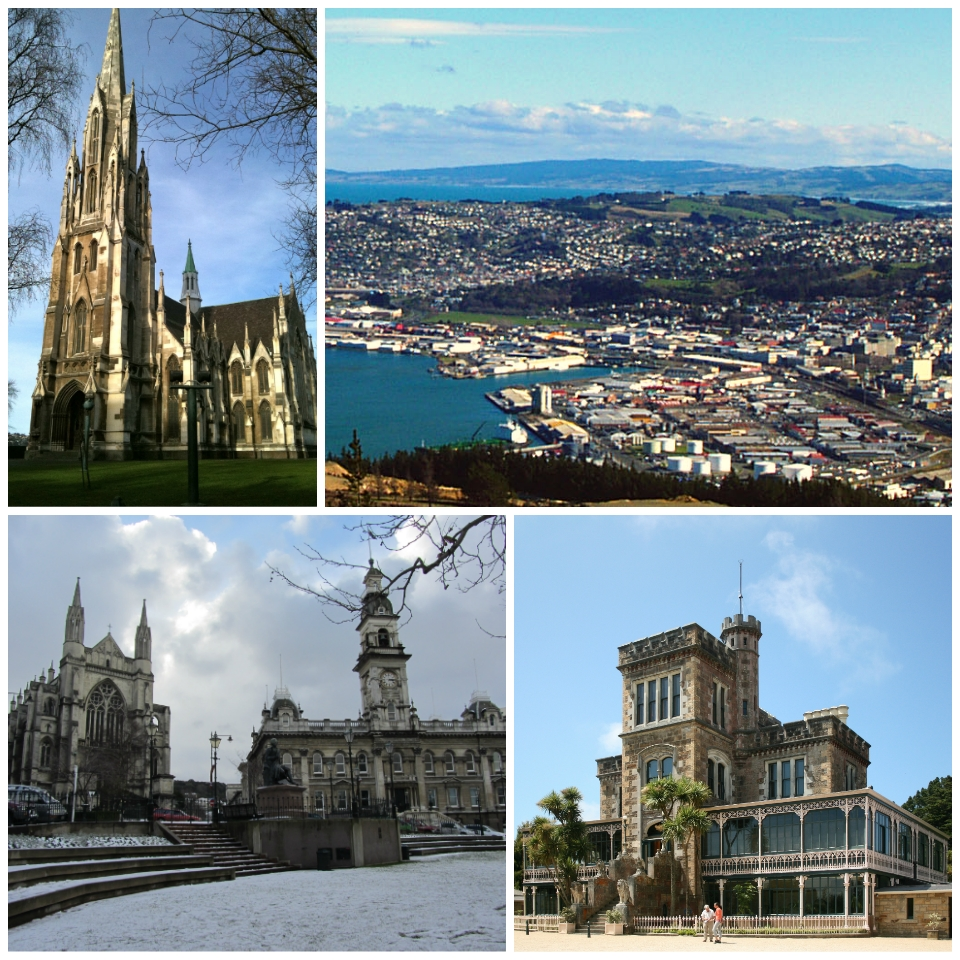
Dunedin – from Dùn Èideann, the Gaelic name for Edinburgh.

There are many places in New Zealand named after people and places in Europe, especially the United Kingdom, the Republic of Ireland, and the Netherlands as a result of the many English, Scottish, Welsh, Irish, Dutch and other European settlers and explorers. These include the name "New Zealand" itself, as described below, along with several notable cities and regions:

- New Zealand – In 1645 Dutch cartographers named the land Nova Zeelandia after the Dutch province of Zeeland. British explorer James Cook subsequently anglicised the name to New Zealand. (Note: Zeeland is spelt "Zealand" in English. New Zealand's name is not derived from the Danish island Zealand.)
- Auckland – Both the city and region, as well as the former province, are named after George Eden, Earl of Auckland, whose title comes from the town of West Auckland, in County Durham, England
- Canterbury – the region, and former province, are named after Canterbury, England.
- Christchurch – the original name of the city, "Christ Church", was decided prior to the ships' arrival, at the Association's first meeting, on 27 March 1848. The exact basis for the name is not known. It has been suggested that it is named for Christchurch, in Dorset, England; for Canterbury Cathedral; or in honour of Christ Church, Oxford. The last explanation is the one generally accepted.
- Dunedin – comes from Dùn Èideann, the Scottish Gaelic name for Edinburgh, the Scottish capital.
- New Plymouth – named for Plymouth, England
- Wellington – Both the city and region, as well as the former province, are named after Arthur Wellesley, 1st Duke of Wellington, whose title comes from the town of Wellington, Somerset, in England.

Small pockets of settlers from other European countries add to the identity and place names of specific New Zealand regions, most notably the Scandinavian-inspired place names of Dannevirke and Norsewood in the Manawatū-Whanganui region.

== Prime ministers ==
All of the ancestors of the 42 prime ministers of New Zealand were European and Anglo-Celtic (English, Scottish, Northern Irish, Welsh, or Irish). Some ancestors of three prime ministers did not originate from Britain or Ireland: some of the ancestors of David Lange were Germans, some of the ancestors of Julius Vogel and Francis Bell were European Jews, and some of John Key's ancestors were Jewish Austrian migrants (his mother's side).

1. Henry Sewell (English)
2. William Fox (English)
3. Edward Stafford (Scottish)
4. Alfred Domett (English)
5. Frederick Whitaker (English)
6. Frederick Weld (English)
7. George Waterhouse (Cornish)
8. Julius Vogel (English-Jewish)
9. Daniel Pollen (Irish)
10. Harry Atkinson (English)
11. George Grey (English, Irish)
12. John Hall (English)
13. Robert Stout (Scottish)
14. John Ballance (Irish, Scotch-Irish)
15. Richard Seddon (English)
16. William Hall-Jones (English)
17. Joseph Ward (Irish)
18. Thomas Mackenzie (Scottish)
19. William Massey (Scotch-Irish)
20. Francis Bell (English-Jewish)
21. Gordon Coates (English)
22. George Forbes (Scottish)
23. Michael Joseph Savage (Irish)
24. Peter Fraser (Scottish)
25. Sidney Holland (English)
26. Keith Holyoake (English)
27. Walter Nash (English)
28. Jack Marshall (Scottish)
29. Norman Kirk (Scottish)
30. Bill Rowling (English)
31. Robert Muldoon (Irish)
32. David Lange (German, Welsh)
33. Geoffrey Palmer (English)
34. Mike Moore (English)
35. Jim Bolger (Irish)
36. Jenny Shipley (English)
37. Helen Clark (Irish, Scottish)
38. John Key (English, Austrian-Jewish)
39. Bill English (Irish, English)
40. Jacinda Ardern (English, Scottish)
41. Chris Hipkins (English)
42. Christopher Luxon (English, Irish)

== See also ==
- Pākehā
- Demographics of New Zealand
- Immigration to New Zealand
- Europeans in Oceania
- European Australians
- European Americans
- European Canadians
- Italian New Zealanders
- Greek New Zealanders
- Armenian New Zealanders
- European emigration
- Romani people in New Zealand
- History of the Jews in New Zealand
