= Kānga waru =

Maori Cuisine

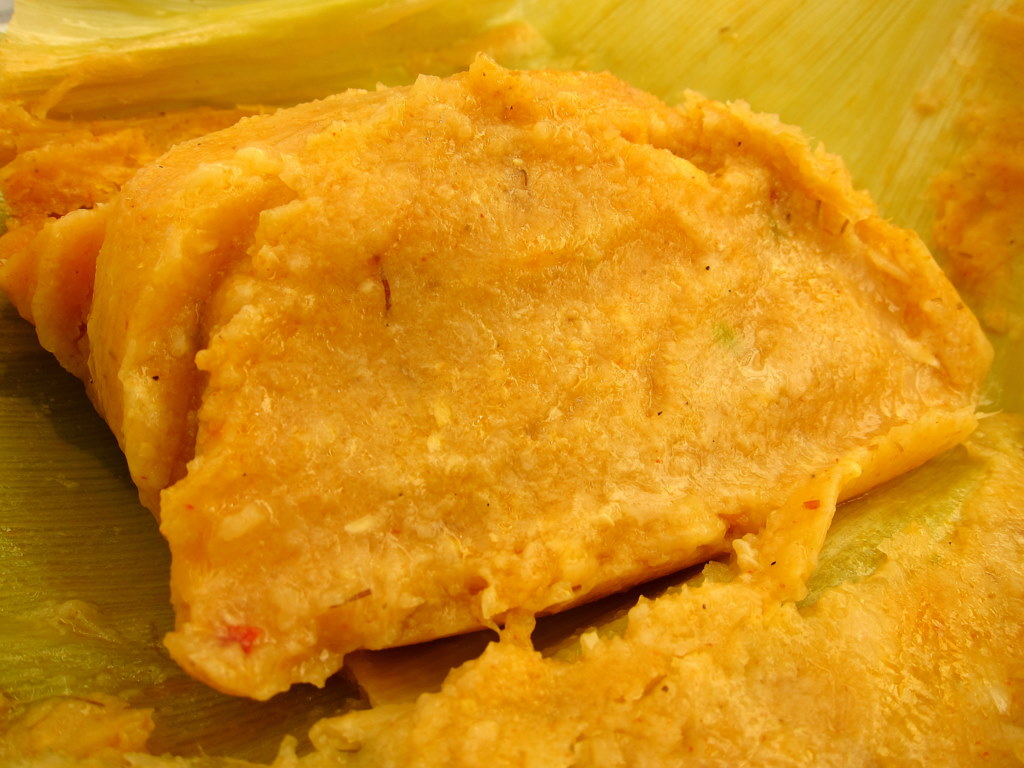
- Alternative names: Corn pudding, Corn and kūmara pudding, Kānga roroi
- Type: Pudding
- Course: Dessert
- Place of origin: New Zealand
- Associated cuisine: Māori cuisine
- Main ingredients: Corn, sweet potato

Kānga waru (waru means 'to scrape') is a type of pudding from New Zealand. The dessert is made from cornmeal made into a dough that is wrapped and steamed. The dessert originates from the Māori people and is closely associated with Māori cuisine.

== Etymology ==
Scrapping (waru) was one of the common preparation methods used by Polynesians for traditional puddings. Corn (borrowed from English as kānga) was introduced to New Zealand by early Europeans and was adopted by Māori as a food crop. Several dishes were made from corn such as kānga pirau (fermented corn) and kānga pungarehu (corn cooked in ash).

== Preparation ==
Kānga waru is prepared from corn, either grated or cornmeal, with flour, sugar, butter, milk and grated kūmara (sweet potato) mixed together and formed into a dough. The dough is then wrapped and steamed for several minutes. Kānga waru is traditionally wrapped in corn husks and cooked in a hāngī, though modern day preparations use foil and is cooked in a similar way to steamed puddings.

== See also ==
- Humitas
- Pamonha, a similar Brazilian corn dessert
- Tamale
- Lepat jagung, a similar desert in Malaysia
