= Boil up =

Maori dish

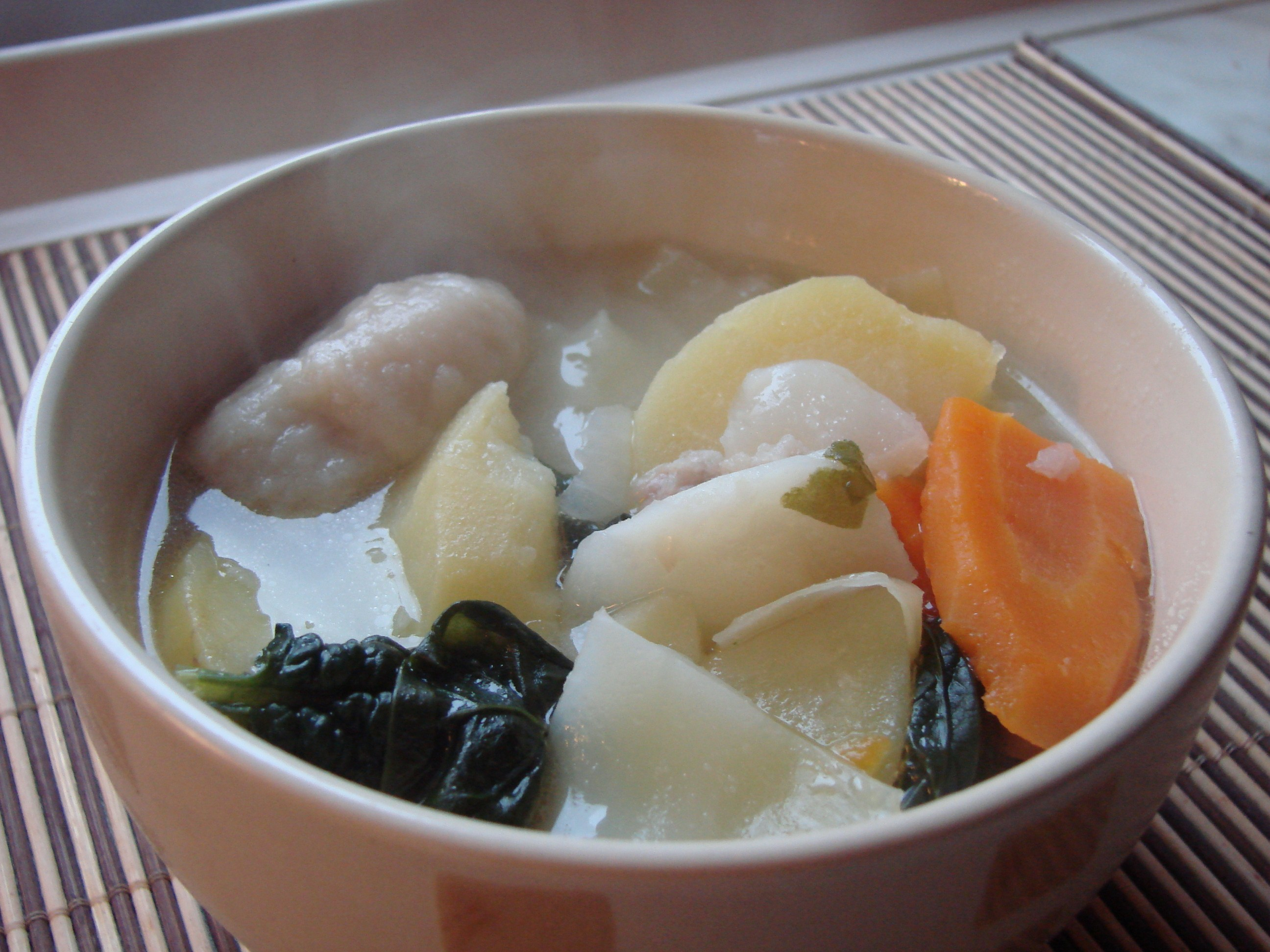
- Boil up
- Alternative names: Pork and puha, Kōhua kai
- Type: Soup
- Place of origin: New Zealand
- Associated cuisine: Māori cuisine
- Main ingredients: Stock, meat, starchy vegetables, leafy vegetables, dumplings

Boil up is a traditional Māori food from New Zealand.

Boil up traditionally is a broth-based soup made from a balanced combination of meat and bones (such as pork), with greens such as pūhā, watercress or cabbage, and kūmara or potatoes, boiled together, along with flour dumplings known as "doughboys".

== Origins ==
In Polynesian cuisine, food was boiled in wooden bowls into which a red-hot stone was dropped. This was sufficient for heating liquids and pastes, but was insufficient to cook taro or pork; those foods were usually baked in an earth oven. The Māori carried these traditions to Aotearoa (New Zealand), making puddings of grated kūmara (called roroi) or mashed kiekie flower bracts in large wooden bowls.

When European settlers arrived they brought with them new foods and iron cooking pots. Pigs and potatoes from Europe were rapidly adopted by Māori, who produced large quantities for trading with the settlers. As settler housing did not have the built-in coal ranges and ovens of Regency Britain, most cooking was done on a hearth, in a cast-iron three-legged cauldron or camp oven. Camp ovens were imported in their hundreds from the 1850s, and were popular with Māori: they could be transported by waka or carried, and could stand on three feet in the embers or be hung by a chain. Camp ovens were used for making flour-and-sugar puddings, baking traditional rēwena bread, and for the first pork-and-potato boil ups.
