= Afghan (biscuit) =

Traditional biscuit in New Zealand

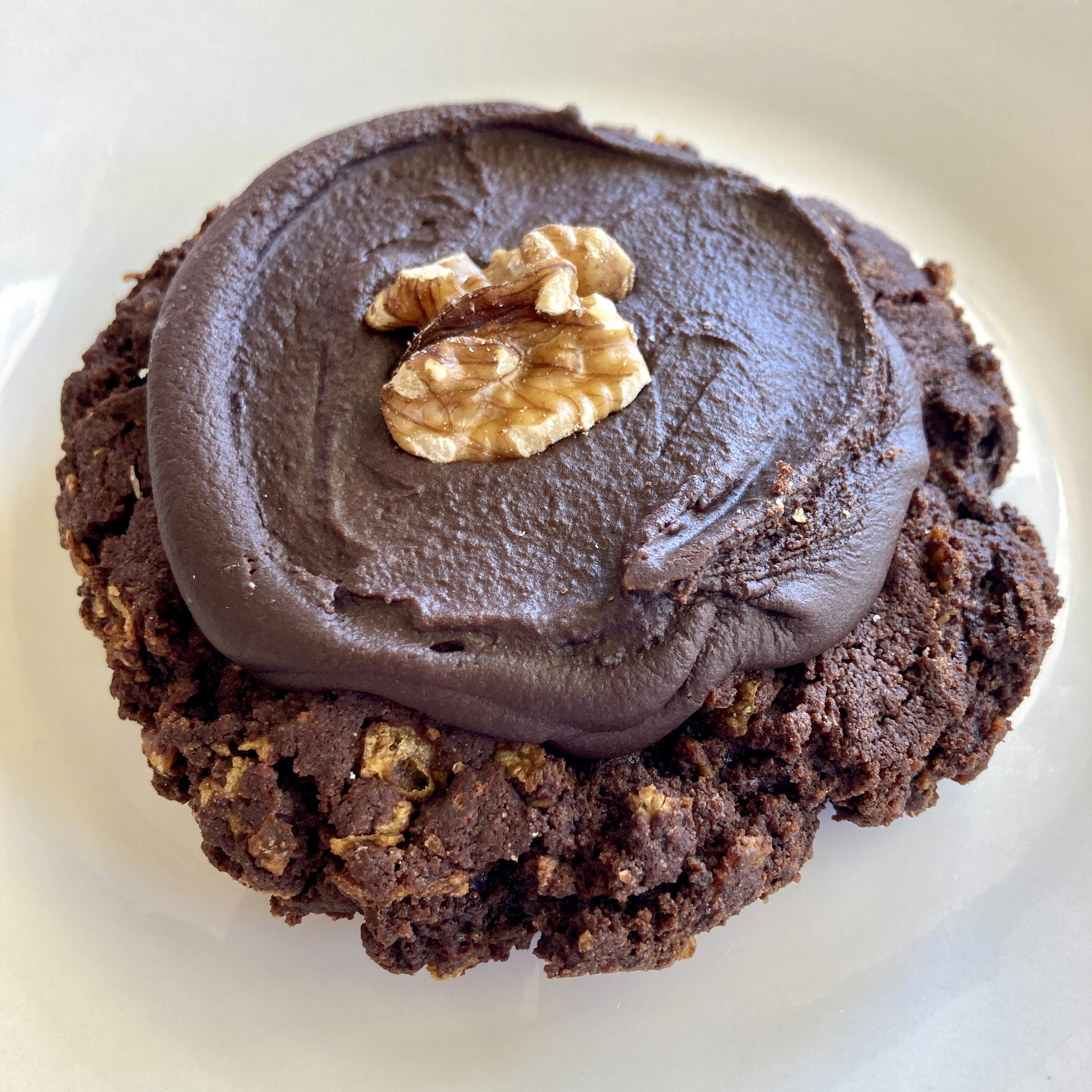
- Alternative names: Milk chocolate roughs
- Type: Biscuit
- Place of origin: New Zealand
- Main ingredients: flour, butter, sugar, cornflakes, cocoa powder, chocolate icing, walnut

An Afghan is a traditional New Zealand biscuit made from flour, butter, cornflakes, sugar and cocoa powder, topped with chocolate icing and a half walnut. The recipe has a high proportion of butter, and relatively low sugar, and no leavening (rising agent), giving it a soft, dense and rich texture, with crunchiness from the cornflakes, rather than from a high sugar content. The high butter content gives a soft melt-in-the-mouth texture, and the sweetness of the icing offsets the low sugar and the cocoa bitterness.

== Name ==
Despite its name, the biscuit's place of origin is thought to be New Zealand. A recipe in The Timaru Herald for "Afghans" (minus the icing and walnut) dates from 1934, and an otherwise identical "Chocolate Cornflakes" biscuit recipe, complete with icing and walnut, was in the same publication of the previous year.

There are many theories in circulation about the origin of the name "Afghan", ranging from the First Anglo-Afghan War to the biscuit's texture and colour being likened to the landscape of Afghanistan, while one theory suggests it was named after the traditional Afghan hat, the pakol. In the wake of the George Floyd protests, the manufacturer of the commercially produced version of biscuit, Griffin's Foods announced in June 2020 that they would rename the product. In a statement issued by the company, it noted that the name of the biscuit was possibly a reference to the colour of "Afghan brown", which could possibly reference the dark skin of Afghan people. Although they acknowledged "there are other theories in circulation", this caused a debate over the name. The decision came amidst a wave of name changes in New Zealand over foodstuffs with names deemed racist or otherwise culturally offensive by some. The biscuit was eventually renamed "Milk Chocolate Roughs" by Griffin's, which advertised the renaming with a new slogan: "Same bikkie. New name." However, the name "Afghan" is still the one used by other companies.

== Ingredients and recipe ==
According to the Edmonds Cookery Book, a batch of 24 afghans is made by combining 200 g (7 oz) butter, 115 g (4 oz) white sugar, 160 g (6 oz) all-purpose flour, 25 g (1 oz) cocoa powder, and 50 g (2 oz) cornflakes. Tablespoon-sized balls of the mixture are formed, placed on a greased baking tray, and baked at 180 °C (360 °F) for around 15 minutes. Once the biscuits are cooled, they are iced with chocolate icing and the half-walnut placed on top. The Edmonds recipe has changed over the years; for example, the 24th De Luxe (1987) edition of the cookbook only called for 75 g (3 oz) of sugar.

Some variations on the recipe exist; crushed Weet-Bix may be substituted for cornflakes, for instance.

== See also ==
- List of cookies
