= Lepet =

Indonesian glutinous rice dumpling

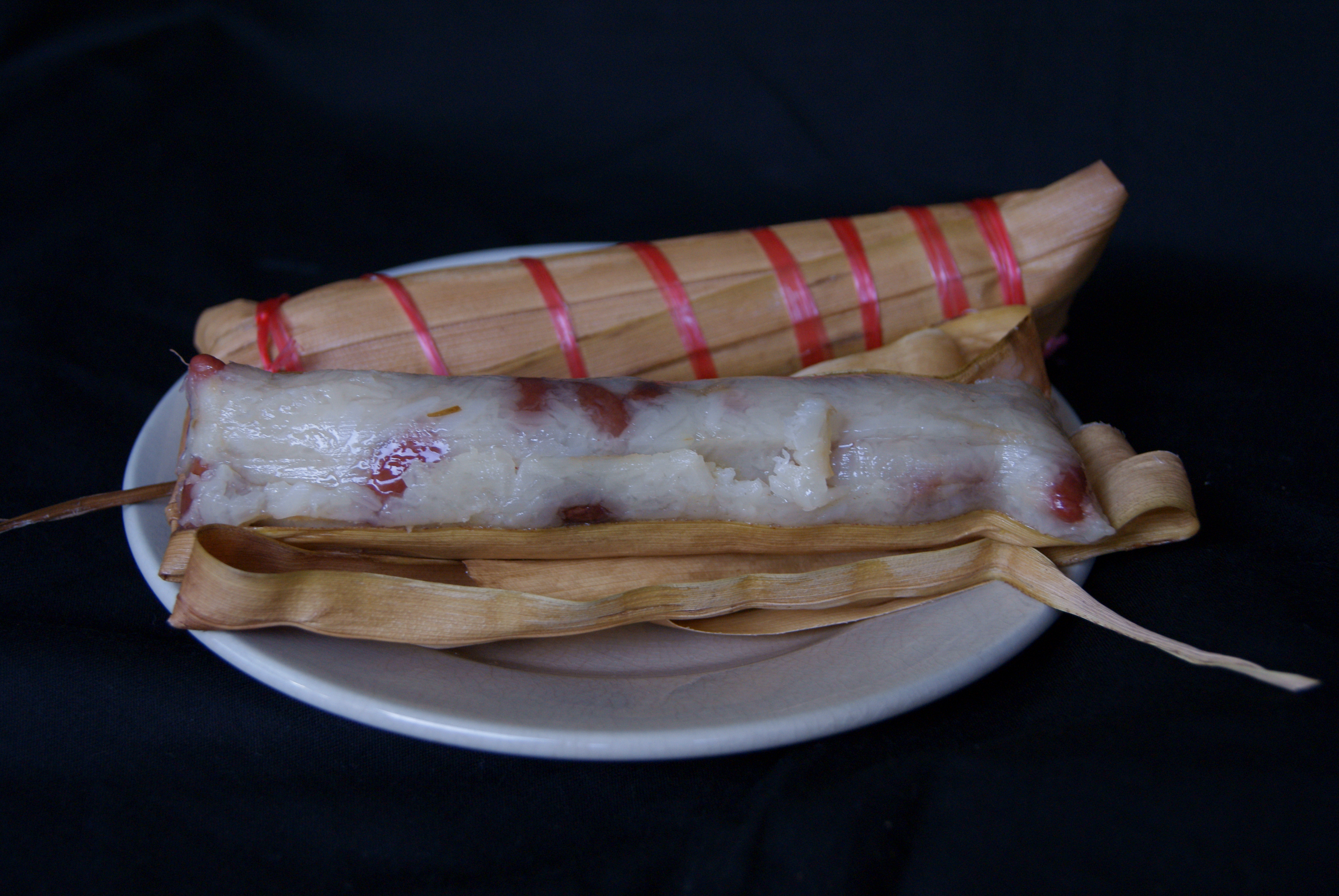
- Peanut filled lepet
- Alternative names: Leupeut (Sundanese), lepat (Malay)
- Type: Dumpling
- Associated cuisine: Javanese, Malay
- Main ingredients: Sticky rice, coconut milk, banana or young coconut leaf

Lepet (in Javanese pronounced [ləpət]), leupeut (in Sundanese), or lepat (in Malay pronounced [ləpat]) is a type of steamed sticky rice dumpling snack found among peoples throughout Java (Javanese and Sundanese), Sumatra and the Malay Peninsula (Malay). The pudding is packed inside a janur (young coconut leaf) or palm leaf. It is similar to lontong, but with a stickier texture and richer flavor due to the use of coconut milk and peanuts.

== Cooking ==
Lepet is made by steaming the ketan (sticky rice) until half cooked in coconut milk then mixing it with pandan leaf and salt until all of the coconut milk is absorbed into the sticky rice. Then the half-cooked coconut milk sticky rice is mixed further with grated coconut flesh and peanuts then wrapped inside janur (young yellowish coconut leaf) in a cylindrical shape and secured with string especially made from coconut leaf fibers. The rice packages inside the coconut leaf are then steamed further until completely cooked. The most common filling is peanut; however, other kinds of beans such as kidney beans, cowpeas, jack beans, or corn might also be used.

== Variants ==
Malay coconut and banana lepat

In the Sundanese area of West Java, it is known as leupeut and is usually made in a smaller size with peanut filling and consumed with tahu sumedang (fried tofu). It is a popular snack in the Kuningan and Sumedang Regency.

In the Malay-inhabited regions of Sumatra, the Malay Peninsula and Singapore, it is known as lepat. Popular kinds include one made with ripe bananas and filled with palm sugar and grated coconut and wrapped inside a banana leaf (lepat pisang); one made from grated corn mixed with coconut and steamed wrapped in corn husks (lepat jagung), and one made with pumpkin (lepat labu). Lepat from tapioca flour were commonplace during the food shortages of Japanese occupation in Malaya and Singapore.

== See also ==
- Burasa
- Ketupat
- Lemang
- Lemper
- Lontong
- Suman
- List of dumplings
- List of steamed foods
- kānga waru - type of corn-wrapped steamed pudding found similarly in New Zealand
