= New Zealand cuisine =

Culinary traditions of New Zealand

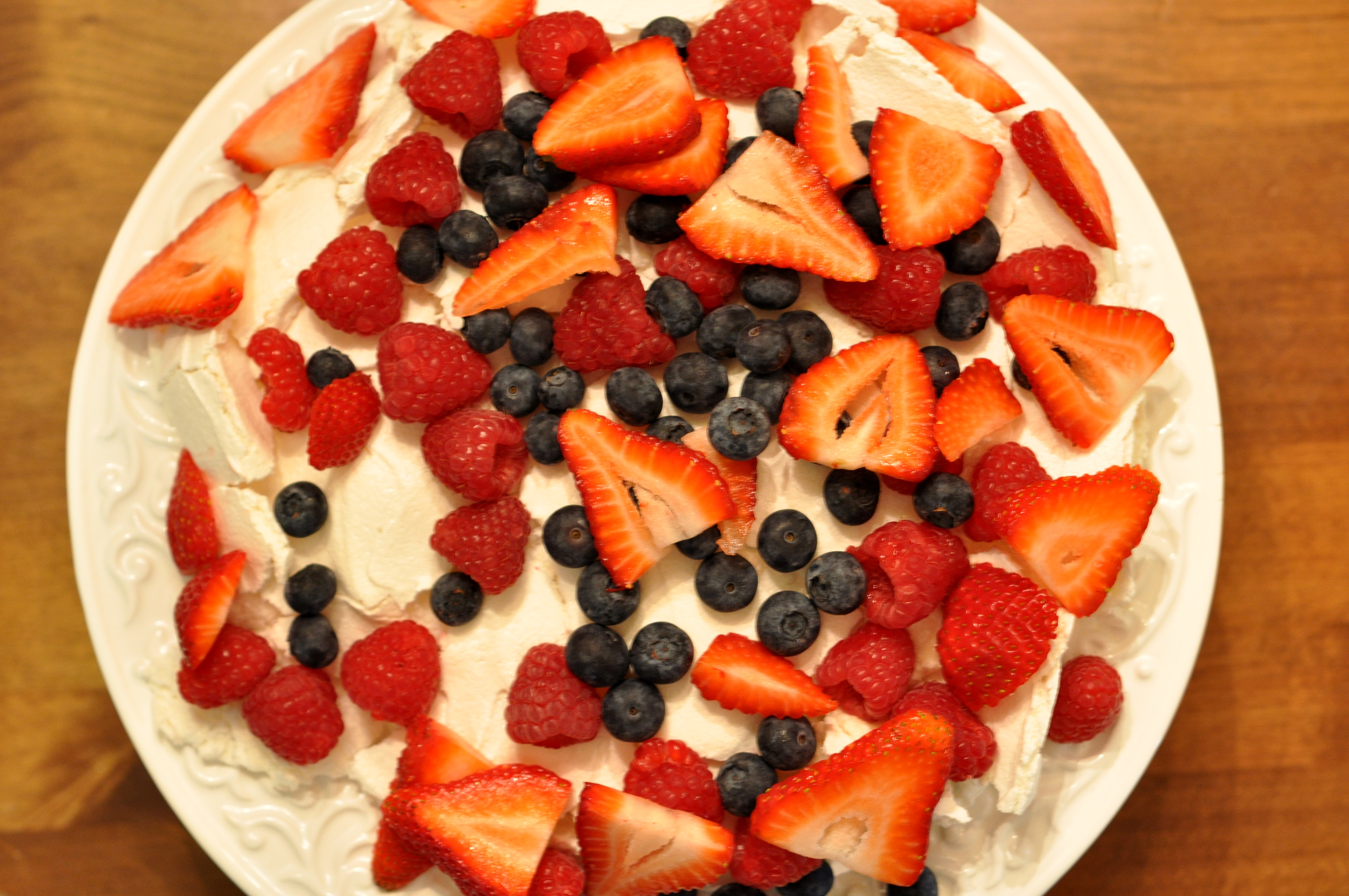
- A pavlova, a dessert popular in Australia and New Zealand
- Country or region: New Zealand
- National dishes: Fish and chips, meat pie
- National drinks: Beer, coffee, lemonade, wine
- See also: Beer in New Zealand, list of restaurants in New Zealand, Māori cuisine, pub food, wine in New Zealand

The cuisine of New Zealand has historical influences from British cuisine and Māori culture. As an island nation with a primarily agricultural economy, New Zealand yields produce from land and sea.

Similar to the cuisine of Australia, the cuisine of New Zealand is a diverse British-based cuisine, with Mediterranean and Pacific Rim influences as the country has become more cosmopolitan. Since the 1970s, new culinary influences such as New American, Southeast Asian, East Asian, and South Asian food have become popular.

== Māori cuisine ==
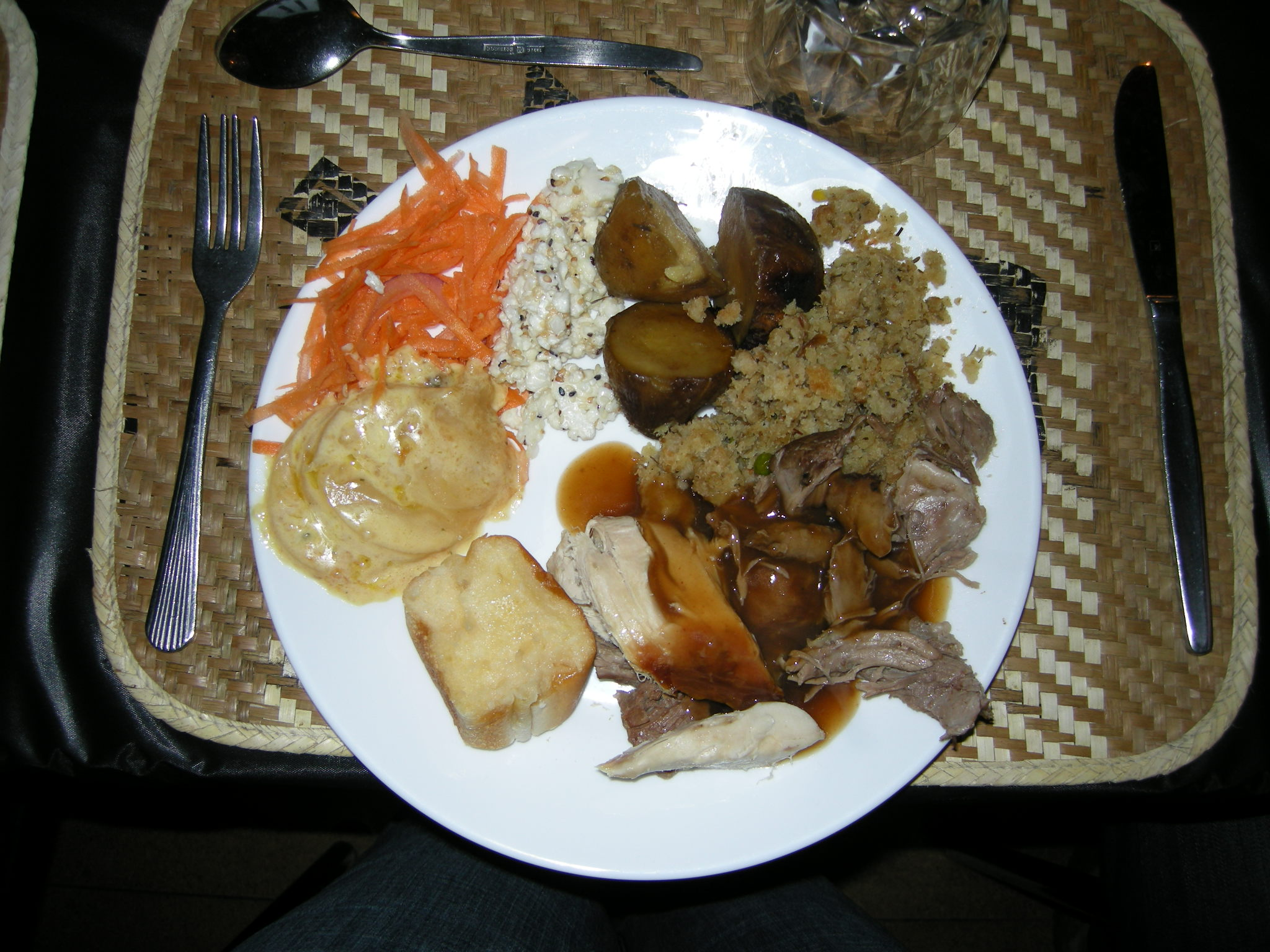
A hāngī dinner as served to tourists

When the Māori arrived in New Zealand from tropical Polynesia, they brought a number of food plants, including kūmara, taro, uwhi (ube, purple yam), hue and tī-pore, most of which grew well only in the north of the North Island. Kūmara could be grown as far south as the northern South Island, and became a staple food as it could be stored over the winter. Native New Zealand plants such as fernroot became a more important part of the diet, along with insects such as the huhu grub. Earthworms, called noke, are a part of the traditional Māori diet as well. Problems with horticulture were made up for by an abundance of bird and marine life. The large, flightless moa was soon hunted to extinction for food and tools as well. Rāhui, or resource restrictions, included forbidding the hunting of certain species in particular places or at certain times of year to allow populations to be maintained. Seafood consumed included kōura or freshwater crayfish, pāua or abalone, and tio or bluff oysters. The discovery of Typha orientalis led to the creation of a gritty unleavened bread made laboriously from its dried pollen called pungapunga.

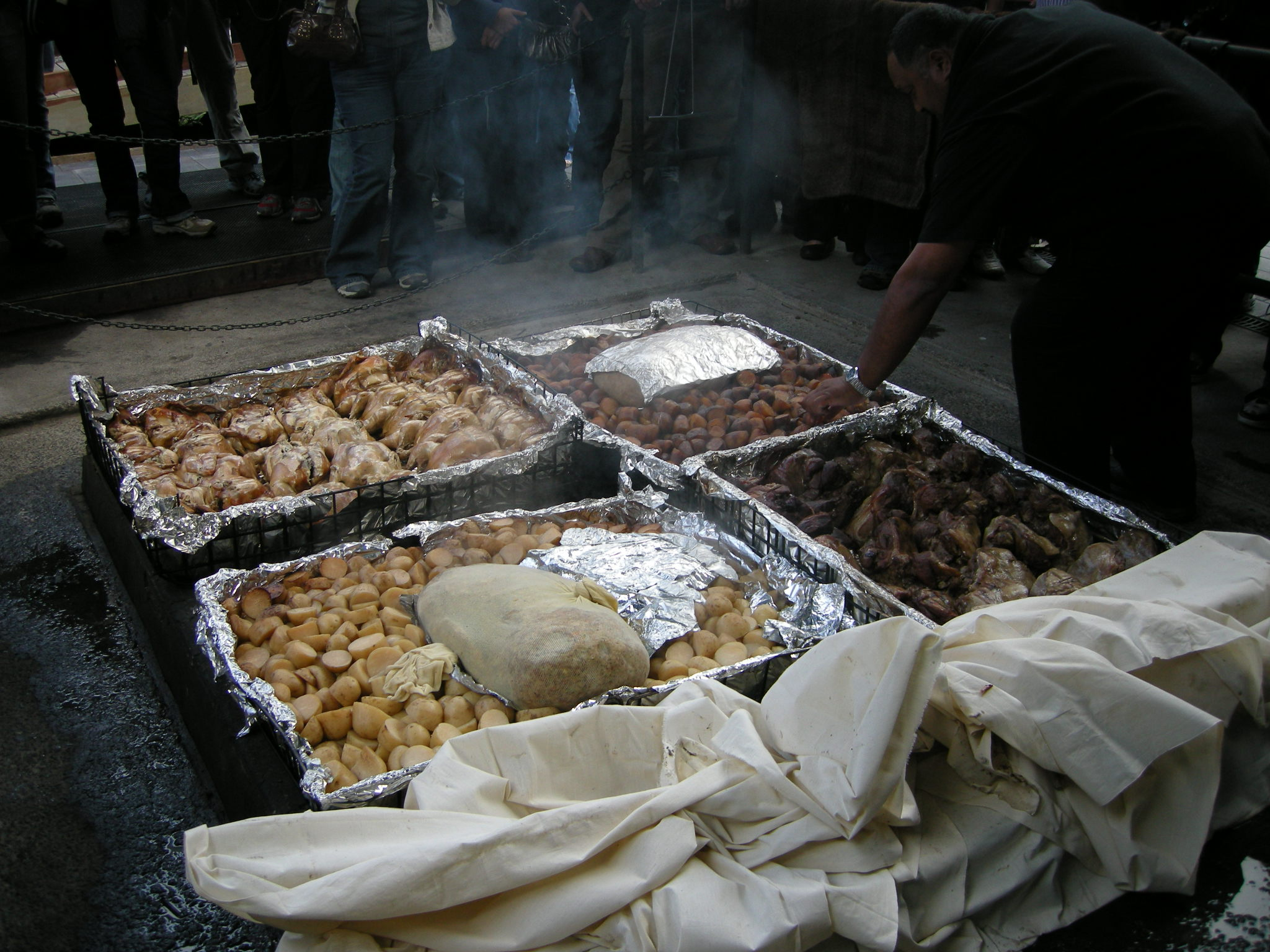
Preparation of a modern hāngī for tourists at Mitai Māori Village, Rotorua

Similar to other Polynesian people, Māori cooked food in earth ovens, known in New Zealand as hāngī, although the word umu is also used. Stones are heated by fire and food packed in leaves placed on top. These packs are then covered with foliage, cloth, or wet sacks, and then a layer of earth. Other cooking methods included roasting, stone-boiling, or steaming using geothermal heated water, and cooking over an open fire.

Some foods were preserved using smoke, air-drying, fermentation, or layers of fat—particularly muttonbirds.

Māori were one of the few people to have no form of alcoholic beverage.

=== Food and religion ===
In traditional Māori religion food was noa, or non-sacred. This meant care had to be taken to prevent it from coming into contact with tapu places or objects. If it did, the tapu of the place or object, and often the people associated with it, would be at risk. High chiefs, and people engaged in tapu work such as tattooing, were tapu and were restricted in how they could deal with food, with the most tapu needing to be fed by others. One story tells of a war party which had to be postponed as no non-tapu people were available to load the food supplies into the party's waka.

=== European influences ===
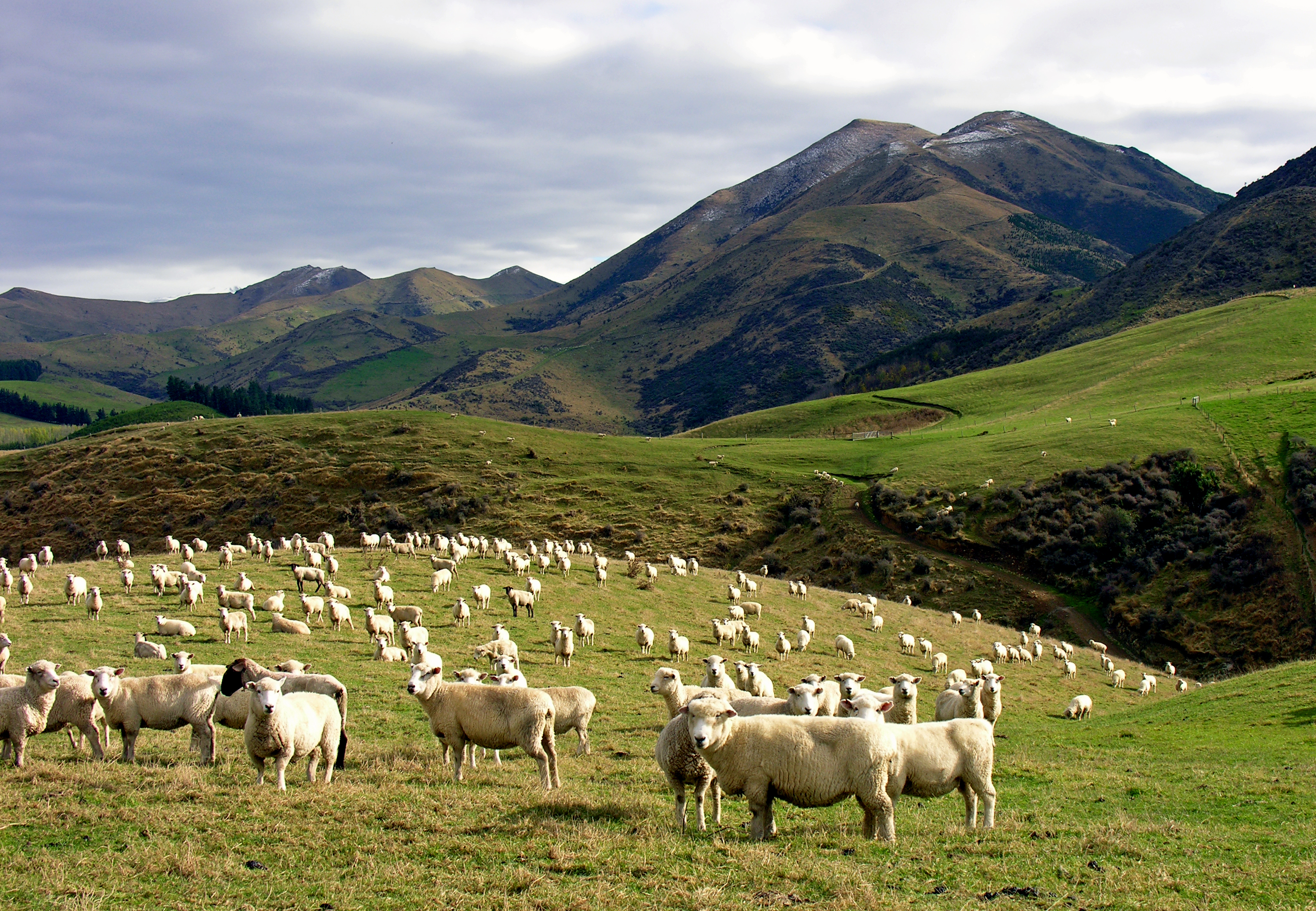
Sheep grazing in Canterbury. Early British settlers introduced Western stock and crops. New Zealand agriculture now produces an abundance of fresh produce.

When Europeans (Pākehā) first arrived in New Zealand from the late eighteenth century, they brought their own foods with them. Some of these, especially pork and potatoes, were quickly adopted by Māori. Potatoes were particularly popular as they were grown in a similar way to kūmara but produced a much higher yield with less effort. Other European foods such as wheat, pumpkin, mutton, sugar, and many types of fruit also became a part of the Māori diet and were widely traded with visiting ships. American sailors brought new varieties of kūmara to New Zealand, and these high-yield varieties quickly superseded the original varieties of kūmara. (Today, most kūmara are the commercial varieties: Owairaka Red, Toka Toka Gold and Beauregard.) The introduction of maize (kōpakipaki or kānga) led to the creation of a meal called kōpiro which involves submerging corn cobs under running water to ferment before its kernels are scraped off and formed into cakes to roast or steam. A coffee and spice merchant of European descent, David Strang, invented instant coffee in Invercargill in 1890. The drink quickly spread around New Zealand and then around the world.

Alcohol, initially rejected as waipiro (stinking water), also became acceptable in Māori life. Most Māori tribes grew surpluses of food for trade with other tribes and with European visitors and settlers. Some tribes grew wealthy from this trade, although the Māori food industry declined in the mid-nineteenth century because of land loss and competition from settler farmers. Many traditional food sources, such as the kererū (wood pigeon) and other birds, as well as some types of fish and plants, became scarce as forests were destroyed and species were over-hunted.

=== Māori cuisine today ===
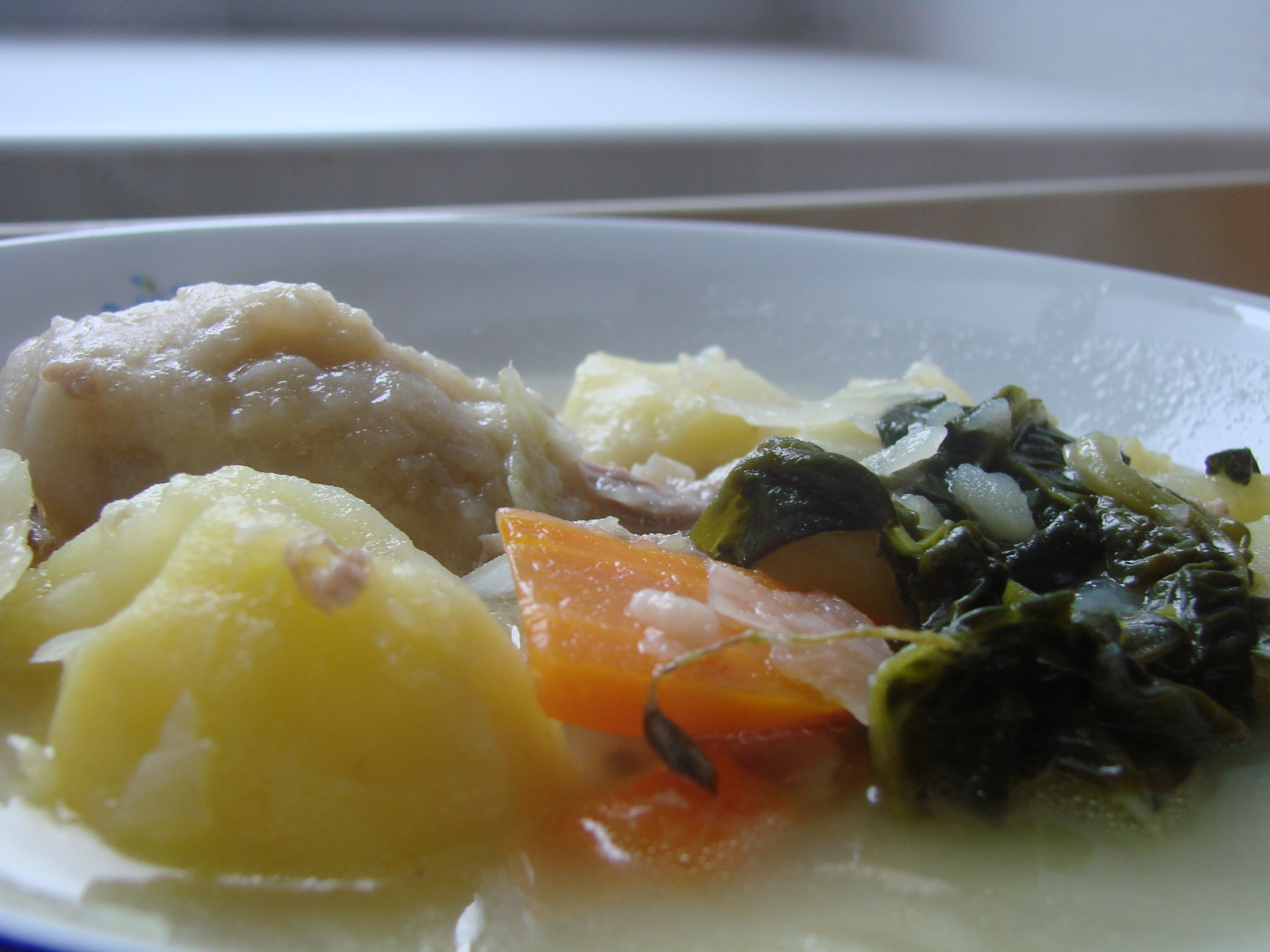
A Māori boil-up

Present-day Māori cuisine is a mixture of Māori tradition, old-fashioned English cookery, and contemporary dishes. Some Māori names for consumables, like pāua (also prized for its shell), have entered common New Zealand English usage.

Most large Māori gatherings feature a hāngī, which is likely to contain foods brought to New Zealand by Māori and by pākehā. In recent decades, there has been much concern that Māori are disproportionately likely to suffer from obesity, heart disease, and diabetes as a result of eating habits.

Two dishes regarded as distinctively Māori are the boil-up—made of pork, potatoes, kūmara, and dumplings—and pork and pūhā (sow thistle), which combine introduced and indigenous foods. Both dishes owe much to nineteenth-century British cooking methods.

Another distinctive food is rēwena or "Māori bread", which is made with fermented potatoes. The 2020 cookbook Hiakai by chef Monique Fiso, academic Tracy Berno and food writer Lucy Corry describes the history, development and tikanga of modern Māori food.

A dish served during Matariki feasts or at hākari (feasts) on the marae is parāoa parai (fry bread). They are described as crispy and golden brown on the outside and fluffy on the inside.

== New Zealand European cuisine ==
The majority of New Zealanders are Pākehā of British descent, so British cuisine has been very influential.

=== British Isles settler food ===
Nineteenth-century British settlers in New Zealand tried as much as possible to reproduce the foods of their homeland. In the early stages of colonisation this was difficult as many ingredients were unavailable. They ate native birds and fish, and used local ingredients in substitution for those which were unavailable, for example brewing tea and beer using unconventional plants. Most of these innovations were abandoned as the New Zealand British population increased and conventional ingredients began to be mass-imported or produced in New Zealand. One innovation which was commonly served on New Zealand tables until the mid-1980s was colonial goose, a stuffed leg of lamb which substituted for goose. A major difference between British and New Zealand British food was that meat was much more readily available to all social classes in New Zealand. Whereas in nineteenth-century Britain, labourers ate meat in very small quantities, in New Zealand they could have it for every meal. Since meat was a high-status food in Britain, British settlers in New Zealand ate vast quantities of it. Dishes such as fish and chips and meat pies remain popular in both the United Kingdom and New Zealand.

Like the British, New Zealand British have traditionally preferred sweet foods, and a wealth of baking dishes celebrate important occasions, reflected through cakes, scones, muffins and other mainly sweet baking dishes. The country's most iconic recipe book, the Edmonds Cookery Book, originally began as publicity material for the baking powder company Edmonds, and contains a high proportion of baking recipes.

=== From Antipodean British fare to Asia-Pacific fusion ===
For most of the twentieth century, New Zealand cuisine remained highly derivative of British food. Unlike Britain, New Zealand escaped major food shortages during World War II. However, demands of the US forces in the Pacific as well as exports to Britain saw meat and butter rationed between 1943 and 1950. From about the 1960s, the advent of affordable air travel allowed New Zealanders to travel overseas more easily. Many New Zealanders went to Europe on overseas experience where they encountered French and Italian cooking, and also the Indian and Chinese restaurants of Britain as well as the New British cuisine. When they returned home they helped create a demand for better-quality food and more variety. They also tried to discover what New Zealand cuisine was, experimenting with hāngī and gaining a greater appreciation of New Zealand produce.

The United Kingdom's joining of the European Economic Community (EEC) (now the European Union) in 1973 sounded the death knell of New Zealand's identity as an agricultural producer for the British Isles, and the formal cultural ties, including cuisine, with the United Kingdom started to become diluted. During this period, certain non-British or Irish European dishes, such as beef bourguignon, had shed the 'ethnic' connotation and entered mainstream New Zealand cooking. The 1970s also saw major changes in take-away food with the arrival of the first American fast-food chains: Kentucky Fried Chicken (KFC) in 1971, Pizza Hut in 1974, and McDonald's in 1976.

The 1980s was marked with economic liberalisation dubbed Rogernomics (named for the then-Minister of Finance, Roger Douglas) that abolished farm subsidies, forcing many farmers to find alternative means of survival. Many chose to produce specialty cheese types like Havarti, Brie and Stilton, or diversified into growing olives (Note: As an example, in 1984 there were only two producers of olive oil hailing from New Zealand. Twenty years later, the figure stood at 600.) or grapes instead of traditional meat and dairy farming. Avocado oil for cooking was commercialised in New Zealand in 1999 by a group of growers based in the Tauranga region.

Rogernomics also abolished most import tariffs and instituted a more relaxed agricultural product import quarantine regime. This allowed hitherto prohibited or prohibitively expensive specialty foods, such as genuine serrano ham from Spain, extra virgin olive oil from Italy, and mango from Thailand, to be available in New Zealand at reasonable costs. These two developments from Rogernomics have given birth to a proliferation of specialist food products available in New Zealand.

On top of changes in available ingredients, the 1980s also witnessed a wholescale liberalisation in attitude towards the formerly 'foreign muck' cooking styles and segmentation of lifestyles according to income and socio-economic status. New Zealand had by this time developed a largely distinct cultural outlook away from the British Isles, and this also made foreign cooking styles more acceptable among the general public. The same era also saw the moneyed populations feeling free to openly emulate the luxurious eating and drinking habits of upper and upper middle classes overseas, as the traditional New Zealand preference of egalitarianism, manifested in widespread prejudice against any deviation from lower-middle-class lifestyles, waned in influence. In the words of New Zealand-based anthropologist David Veart, this period of sea change in New Zealand's culinary culture was akin to "being let out after a long school detention".

== Other cuisines in New Zealand ==
People from many different backgrounds have settled in New Zealand, and many have tried to reproduce their native cuisines or national dishes in New Zealand. Similar to early Pākehā settlers, this often proved difficult. Larger ethnic groups, such as the Chinese, were able to import some ingredients, but often dishes had to be modified to use local ingredients. Ethnic restaurants have served as community meeting places and have also given other New Zealanders a chance to try different cuisines. However, for most of its history there were few ethnic restaurants in New Zealand other than inauthentic Chinese, Indian and Italian eateries.

The Immigration Act 1986 completely abolished nationality preference for immigration, and immigration from East Asia, Southeast Asia and South Asia has greatly increased since. Many of these immigrants have brought their cuisines to New Zealand, and often opened ethnic restaurants and takeaway eateries, giving New Zealanders a chance to try more authentic editions of Japanese, Thai, Malay, regional Chinese, Indian, and other Asian cuisines. Over time these ethnic cuisines have been gradually accepted by Pākehā and Māori New Zealanders. Consequently, most New Zealand cities have a wide variety of ethnic restaurants, and foods such as kebabs, couscous, and sushi are served virtually everywhere. Many ethnic origin dishes have been willingly adopted by New Zealanders as their own, including sushi, antipasto, butter chicken, pad thai, pasta, such that they appear in home cooking, as well as in generic New Zealand restaurants.

Ingredients for many ethnic dishes have become much easier to find in major cities, mostly through speciality or ethnic food stores started by many of the post-1987 migrants to New Zealand, but in some cases also through mainstream New Zealand supermarket chains. Similar to Australia, in time the increasing availability of ingredients gave birth to a more authentic style of ethnic cooking, and some ethnic ingredients have been adopted for local cooking: ingredients such as extra virgin olive oil and sun-dried tomatoes, and to a lesser extent fish sauce and rice paper wrappers were already seen as ordinary ingredients by 2000, whereas even by the late 1980s many people would still have regarded them as exotic. (Note: Peta Mathias in 2005 claims ingredients such as fish sauce and rice paper are now a normal part of New Zealand household pantries. Many New Zealanders still regard these as 'ethnic' ingredients, although as in Australia the foreign connotation is decreasing with the passage of time.)

== Contemporary cuisine ==
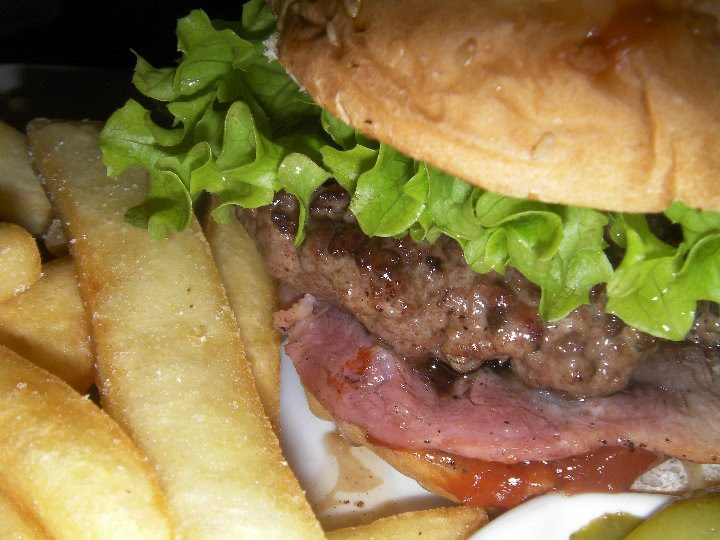
This hamburger at a Botany fast food chain contains slices of canned beetroot.

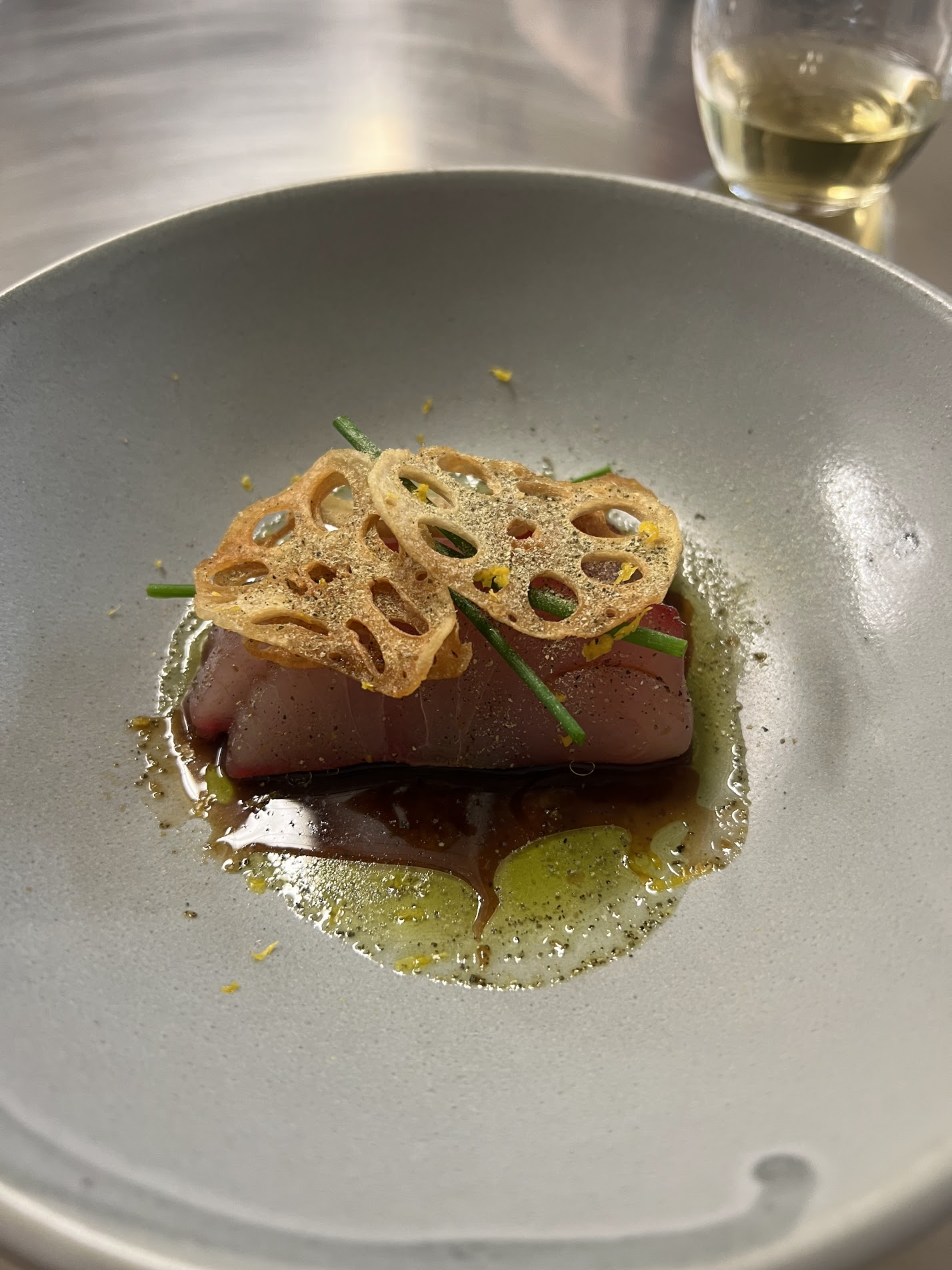
Kingfish crudo, lotus chips, ponzu served at the restaurant Field & Green in Wellington

As a result of various developments, the cuisine of New Zealand in the 21st century is in a state of flux: cosmopolitan Pacific Rim fare's reign is now the norm in much of metropolitan eating-out scenes, (Note: There are even reports that in Auckland by 2007, the traditional fund-raising sausage sizzles at many schools in the more affluent suburbs have been replaced with sushi, a supposedly lower fat and healthier alternative.) and traditional hearty settlers' food, now dubbed 'Kwisine Kiwiana', but reinterpreted through Pacific Rim cooking knowledge, is a popular cooking style for eating-out scenes even in the most remote rural regions. Most of the home cooking prepared at households in Auckland is now a mix of traditional Kiwiana dishes heavily modified by Mediterranean and Asian techniques and ingredients, and adapted versions of Mediterranean, Chinese, and Indian dishes. In the more culturally traditional parts of the country, such as rural Canterbury and the West Coast, however, traditional Kiwiana fare is still the norm at many homes.

Certain vestiges of traditional Kiwiana dishes remain popular throughout the country, such as fish and chips, meat pies, custard squares, pavlova, and others. (Note: The author David Burton has witnessed plenty of New Zealand comments that they are thankful New Zealand no longer eats much of traditional Kiwiana fare.) An active nostalgia movement supports the traditional Kiwiana cuisine, as spearheaded by the popularity of the television series Kiwi Kitchen presented by Richard Till, which is believed to be a public response to a common perception that the traditional Kiwiana dishes are disappearing from the New Zealand tables. Home baking is particularly believed to be the last bastion of New Zealand cuisine still unaffected by international trends.

Concurrently, food habits are changing in Australia to lighter fares influenced by the Mediterranean, and subsequently Southeast Asian, styles of cooking. The proximity, common history, and strong modern political, economic, cultural, and family ties between the two countries means many New Zealand diners and chefs have always been well informed of the trends in the Australian dining scene. Many chefs had worked in Australia and endeavour to learn from their trans-Tasman counterparts, and in time the changing Australian culinary scene has trickle-down effects on the New Zealand cuisine as well. (Note: An example is Judith Tabron, owner of the Soul Bar and Bistro in Auckland. Tabron invites Australian chefs such as Bill Marchetti, Philip Johnson, Stephanie Alexander, and Greg Malouf across the Tasman to New Zealand as guest chefs at Soul from time to time specifically to teach her staff about current Australian food trends, and some of their styles of cooking have become part of the standard menu at Soul which subsequently become part of the New Zealand eating scene via the publishing of these dishes' recipes in popular home cookbooks in New Zealand.)

In general, there are minimal differences between the food preference of New Zealand and Australia. The food trends in New Zealand tend to trail its trans-Tasman counterparts by a few years to a decade, such as Mediterranean cookery, which did not become mainstream in New Zealand until the dawn of the 1990s, while its influence was already felt in Australia by the 1980s. While Australia has by the early 21st century developed a well-established niche specialist produce distributing channel, a similar system is still in its infancy across the Tasman. However, in recent times Auckland and Wellington have food fashions moving essentially in sync with that of Sydney and Melbourne. (Note: A positive Australian comment on modern urban New Zealand cooking, specifically Auckland, is from Bruce Elder of the Sydney Morning Herald, "...here was a time when discriminating eaters [from Australia] were told to take a packed lunch when visiting New Zealand. Now it is consistently good and also, at the upper end, very cheap. With an exchange rate of around $NZ1.20 equalling A$1 meals at the best restaurants in Auckland work out at around A$25 for mains and that, literally, is half what you would pay for the same in Sydney's upmarket restaurants." A number of Sydney and Melbourne fine-dining restaurants have Auckland connections, such as Wildfire restaurant in Sydney, owned by the former owner of Cin Cin in Auckland. Molecular cuisine has also landed in Auckland as in Sydney by 2006, but is still unheard of in much of the country.)

One major recent development in the food scene is the emergence of a genuine café culture and disappearance of the traditional institution of tearooms at large. Before the 1990s, tearooms proliferated throughout the country offering cream tea, cakes, cucumber sandwiches, and pastries such as custard squares, with filtered coffee or tea as drinks. New Zealanders have copied the Mediterranean practise of drinking espresso-based coffees, but also invented instant coffee, which is now widely consumed around the world. In time, cafes became popular and many tearoom owners converted their businesses to cafes. Cream tea has gone out of fashion in the contemporary New Zealand dining scene, and scones are baked at homes rather than served in eateries.

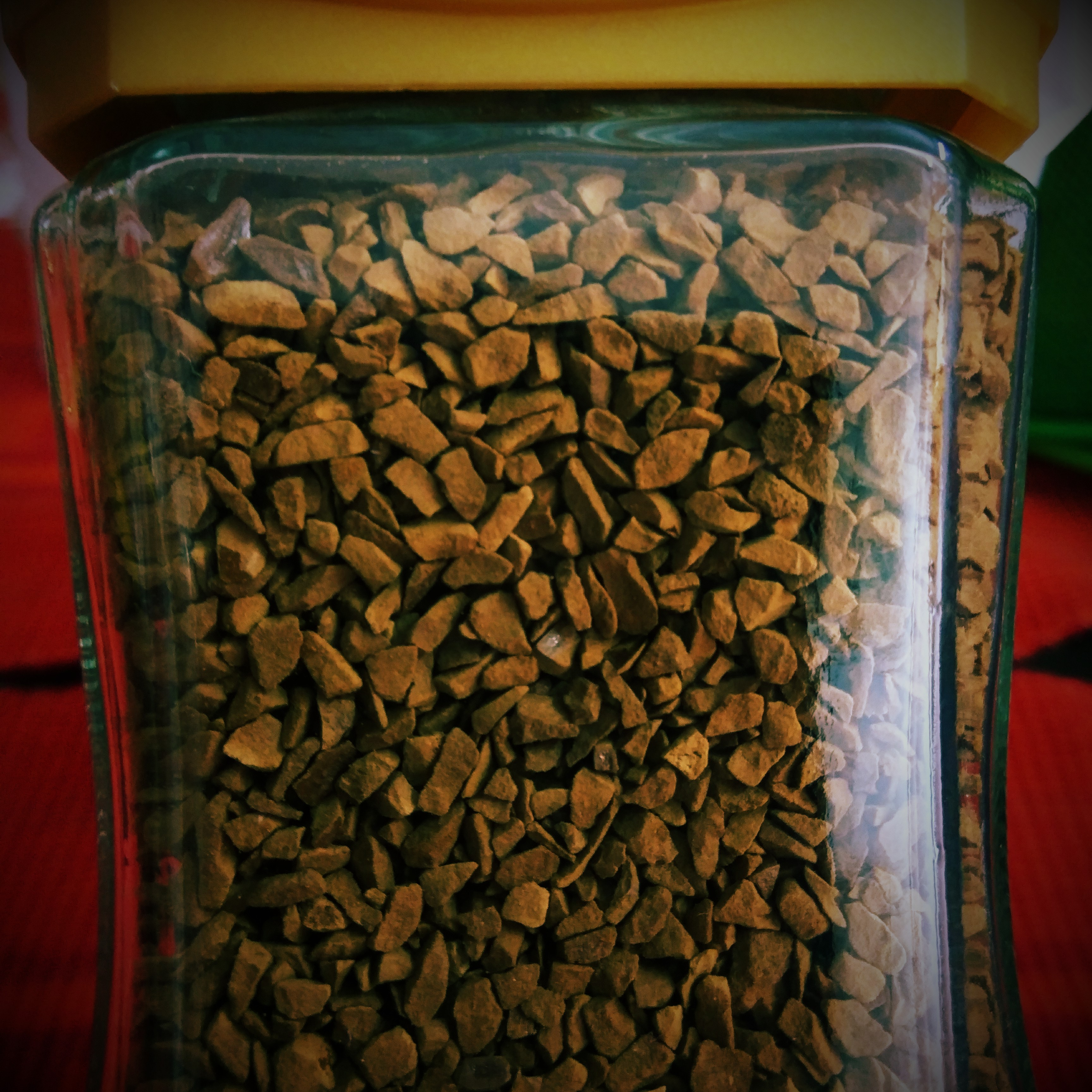
Instant coffee, invented in Invercargill in 1890. The powdered drink is perhaps New Zealand's greatest contribution to international gastronomy.

Vegetarianism had been regarded as an alternative lifestyle for many years, but became more mainstream during the 1980s. However, despite exhortations by the Ministry of Health and their allies for people to eat less meat, and more cereals, fruits, and vegetables, a highly meat-based diet remains a part of New Zealand culture, albeit with a decrease in red meat consumption, and intake of fish and chicken has been on the rise due to their relative affordability. Annual meat consumption was 75.2 kg (166 lb) per capita in 2019, comprising 41.1 kg (91 lb) of chicken and other poultry, 18.9 kg (42 lb) of pork, ham and bacon, 11.6 kg (26 lb) of beef and veal, and 3.6 kg (7.9 lb) of lamb and mutton.

== New Zealand cuisine in other countries ==
Globally, New Zealand cuisine has little effect, although Australia does feel influences from New Zealand cuisine. The pavlova has been the object of a decades-long battle with Australia over where it was invented. According to the Oxford English Dictionary, pavlova was invented in New Zealand.

Fusion cuisine and foreign cuisine styles interact with modern New Zealand cuisine, with chefs from New Zealand actively learning overseas trends, (Note: Mark McDonough of Zarbo Cafe and Deli claims how he actively sources overseas food and accompanying culinary ideas for inspiration.) and chefs like Peter Gordon, bakers such as Dean Brettschneider, and foodies such as Lauraine Jacobs influencing fusion cuisines derived from New Zealand cuisine. Cuisine magazine, first published in 1986, has earned global fame and is held in high prestige among the worldwide foodie communities. (Note: For example, the Cuisine magazine was selected as the best food magazine in the world at the 2007 Le Cordon Bleu World Food Media Awards run by Tasting Australia and sponsored by Le Cordon Bleu, beating other food magazines published in other parts of the English-speaking world.)

== Alcoholic beverages ==
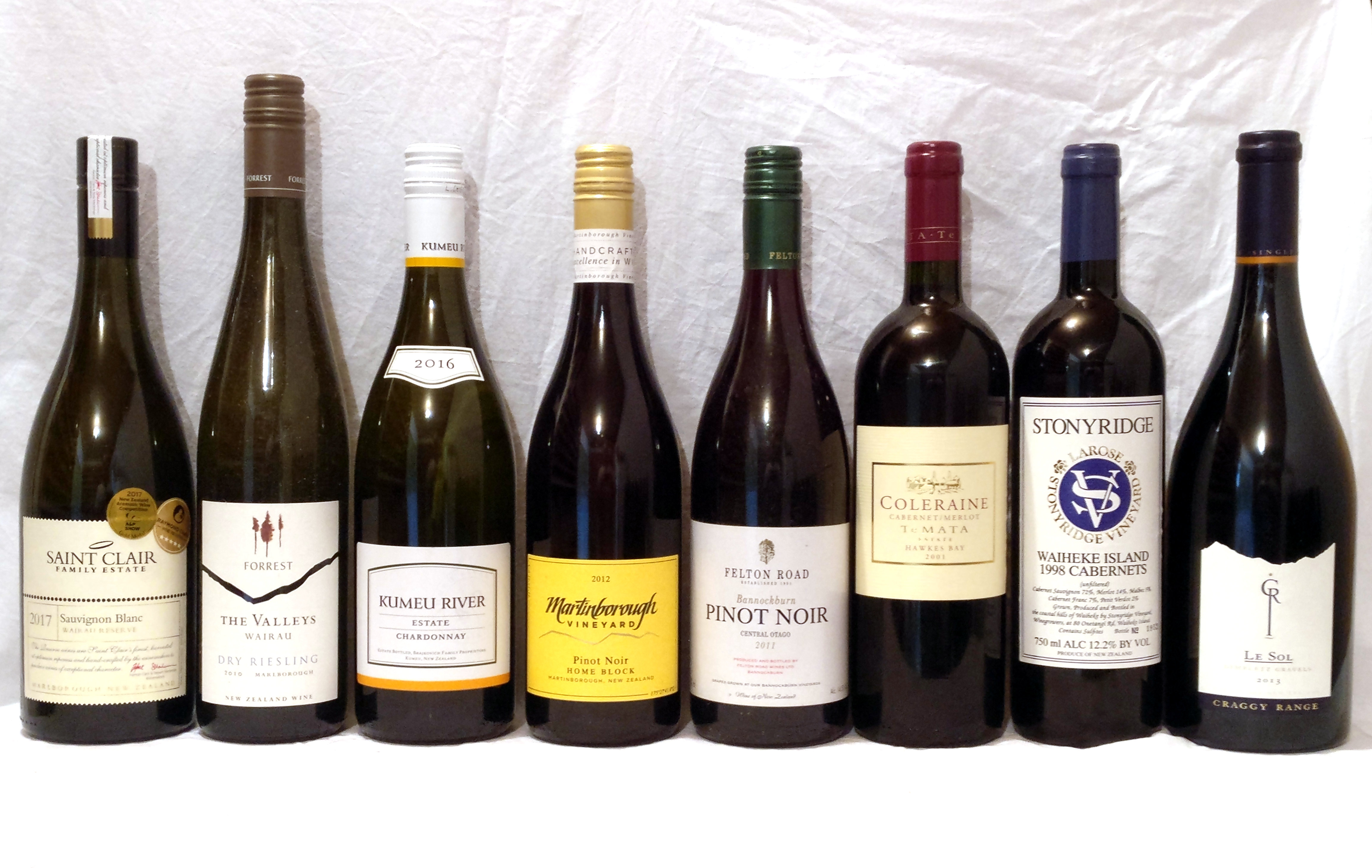
A selection of New Zealand wines

New Zealand has a successful wine industry, with about 76 million litres being exported in the year to June 2007. The first vines are thought to have been introduced by missionary Samuel Marsden, and planted in 1817 by Charles Gordon, superintendent of agriculture for the missionaries, according to Dr Richard Smart who was viticultural editor of both editions of The Oxford Companion to Wine. Official British resident James Busby is credited with producing wine at Kerikeri in 1833, and Charles Darwin noted the winery in his diary when he visited Kerikeri in 1835.

Small vineyards were also planted by French settlers in Akaroa in the 1840s. However, wine was drunk in relatively small quantities well into the twentieth century, with the average per capita consumption only about 2.6 litres in 1966. The high price of imported wines probably prevented New Zealanders from developing a taste for wine, although it did help sales of local vintages. The quality of these wines slowly improved, with New Zealand wines winning three gold and 13 silver medals at the International Wine Fair in 1963. Aided by the deregulation of the economy in the 1980s and 1990s, domestic wine consumption increased and New Zealand wine won increasing accolades internationally.

There are 10 major wine-producing areas in New Zealand, with Marlborough famed for its sauvignon blanc, Gisborne for its chardonnay, and Central Otago and Martinborough known for pinot noir and pinot gris. Hawkes Bay is known for its bold cabernets, and Auckland's Waiheke Island is home to one of the top 20 cabernet blends in the world. Marlborough and Hawkes Bay are New Zealand's two premium wine-growing regions.

Beer is the most popular alcoholic drink in New Zealand, accounting for 63% of available alcohol for sale. New Zealand is ranked 27th in beer consumption per capita, at around 64.7 litres per person per annum. The vast majority of beer produced in New Zealand is a type of lager, either pale or amber in colour, and between 4%–5% alcohol by volume. There are also over 100 smaller craft breweries and brewpubs producing a vast range of beer styles. The two largest breweries in New Zealand, Lion Nathan and DB Breweries, control almost 90% of sales by volume between them. New Zealand is also a leading hops-producing nation with some of the most sought-after hops in the world.

== Patterns of eating ==
Most New Zealanders eat their main meal—known as 'dinner' or sometimes 'tea'—in the evening. The move from midday to evening dinners began in the early 20th century, although the tradition of a midday dinner on Sunday remained well into the 1960s. In 1962, a nationwide food survey reported 75% of households normally ate their main meal in the evening, but over 50% of households ate their Sunday main meal at midday. The survey was repeated in 1982, by which time 83% of households ate their main meal in the evening, and only 21% of households ate their Sunday main meal at midday.

In the summer, barbecues have become popular since the late 20th century, generally as a social event. Guests will usually be invited to bring beer or wine, and on occasion meat, which the host will cook. Sometimes guests contribute a salad to the gathering instead. Traditionally, the men cook the meat. Some gardens are designed with special areas for barbecuing. Similar Māori gatherings will often feature a hāngī, a pit in which meats or fish are cooked with vegetables. A deep hole is dug in the ground, lined with red-hot stones and covered with vegetation. The food is then placed on top and covered with damp cloth or leaves. Water is added before the hole is quickly covered with earth and left to steam for several hours. Traditionally, men dig and prepare the hole, and women prepare the food to go in it. All members of an extended family (whānau) help out for such a feast.

Many New Zealand gatherings feature a custom known as 'bring a plate' (potluck) in which each guest will bring a plate of food to share. This allows people to host large groups without incurring serious expense. Similar customs include guests bringing salads or meat to a barbecue. Most New Zealand parties are 'BYO' (bring your own alcohol), but in this case the drinks may not be shared.

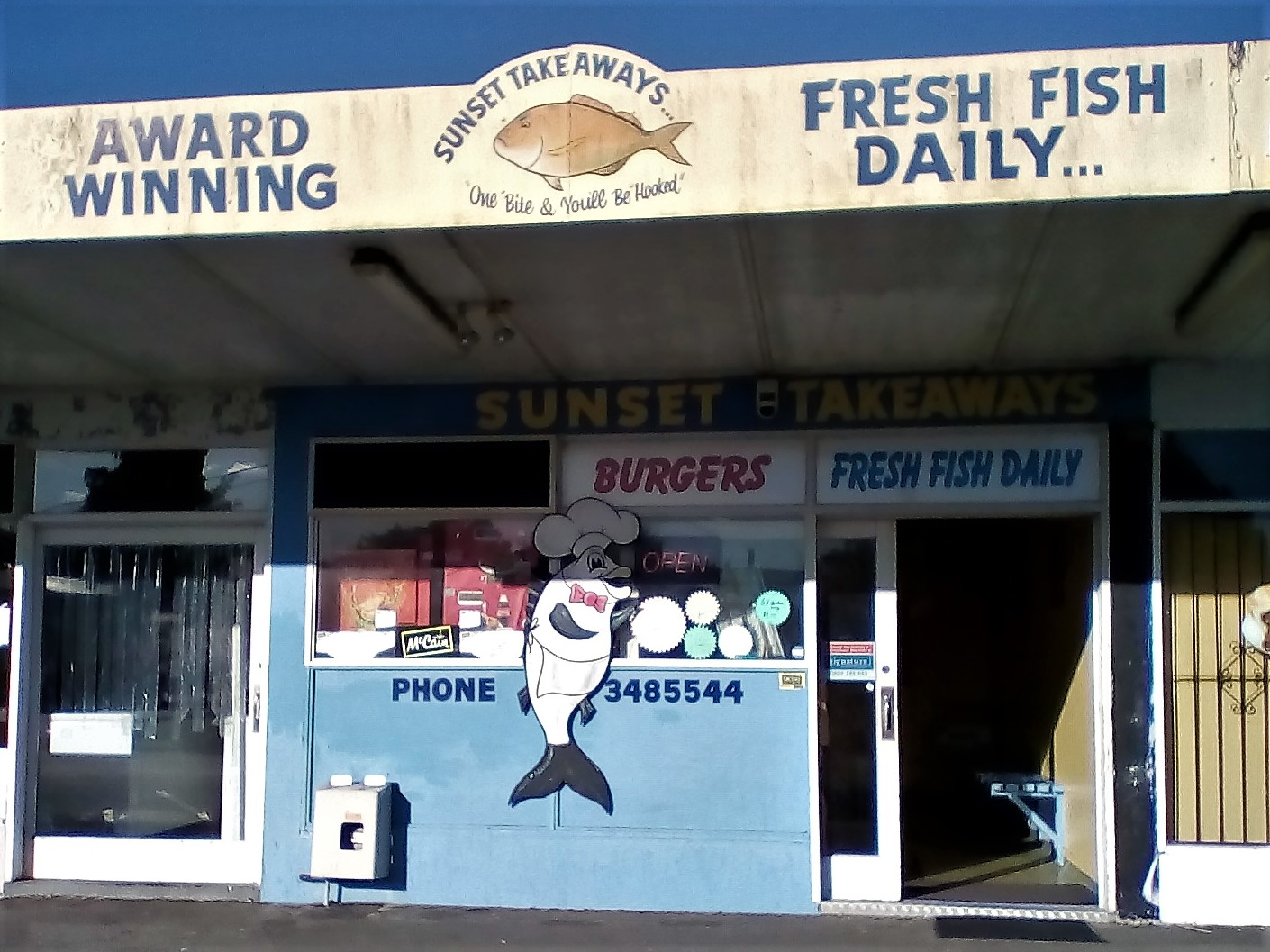
A fish and chip shop in Rotorua. Fish and chips is a popular take-away food in New Zealand.

New Zealand's dining-out culture developed strongly in the 1960s, thanks partially to the liberalisation of liquor licensing laws (in 1961) and popularisation of cafés and other similar casual dining establishments. It is common for people to visit cafés regularly for lunch or morning or afternoon snacks. On the other hand, eating at a restaurant is still regarded as a special occasion or treat for most of the population.

Fish and chips, the staple take-away meal in New Zealand, has been popular for decades. The first fish and chip shop in New Zealand, London Fried Fish Shop, was operated by Cornish James Henry Pomeroy opposite Invercargill Provincial Council Building with its first advertisement appearing in May 1903. Since the 1970s, a larger fast food culture has developed, similar to that in the United States. Many American fast-food chains have a presence in New Zealand, and local variants (such as Burger Fuel and Hell Pizza) have arisen. The meat pie is possibly the nearest thing New Zealand has to street food, sold in dairies, bakeries, supermarkets, petrol stations, and school canteens. Pies are usually made with beef mince or steak, lamb, chicken, veggies, or pork; sweet pies are less common. A fast-food chain based on pies, Georgie Pie, was founded in 1977; however, it ran into financial trouble and went out of business in 1998, with McDonald's New Zealand buying its assets. (The chain was revived in a limited form between 2013 and 2020, with pies being sold through McDonald's restaurants.)

In malls, food courts have become popular, with several in Auckland alone. Immigration has led to an increase in choice and quality, with many food halls offering Asian cuisines including Thai, Indian, Turkish, Malaysian, Japanese and Chinese, as well as distinctly New Zealand fare such as roast dinners.

== New Zealand foods ==
=== Developed in New Zealand ===
- Afghan biscuits
- Anzac biscuits
- Boil up
- Colonial goose
- Cheese roll
- Chocolate fish
- Hāngī
- Hokey pokey ice cream
- Kānga pirau
- Kānga waru
- Kiwi onion dip
- Lolly cake
- Louise cake
- Marmite (New Zealand variety)
- Parāoa parai
- Pineapple lumps
- Rēwena bread
- Toroī

=== Imported foods, now significant in New Zealand ===
- Fish and chips
- Lamingtons
- Pikelets, derived from the Scotch pancake
- Roast lamb and mutton
- Sausage rolls
- Sausage sizzle
- Savoury pies, commonly filled with meat, fish or bacon and egg
- Scones
- Shortbread
- Vegemite
- Weet-Bix

== See also ==
- List of Australian and New Zealand dishes
- Category:Restaurants in New Zealand
- Alcohol in New Zealand
- List of Oceanian cuisines
