= Colonial goose =

Preparation of roast leg of lamb or mutton

- Place of origin: New Zealand
- Invented: 1919
- Main ingredients: Mutton or lamb
- Ingredients generally used: Honey, dried apricots, breadcrumbs, onion, parsley, thyme or sage

Colonial goose is a preparation of roast leg of lamb or mutton popular as a dish in New Zealand until the last quarter of the 20th century.

Early colonial pioneers in New Zealand had sheep aplenty, but goose was relatively scarce. To prepare dishes similar to those they had back home in the old country the pioneers were very inventive. Colonial goose is now a recognised classic, with some restaurants featuring it as a main attraction at midwinter festivities (21 June in New Zealand).

It involves the careful boning out of a leg of lamb, stuffing it with honey and dried apricots, in addition to traditional stuffing based on breadcrumbs, onion, parsley and thyme or sage, and then marinating it in a red wine-based marinade which gives it the appearance of goose when cooked.

== See also ==
- List of lamb dishes
