= Romani people in New Zealand =

Romane manusha ando Nevo Zelando (Romani)

Total population
- 219 (2023)

Regions with significant populations
- Auckland

Languages
- New Zealand English, Romani

Religion
- Christianity, Romani mythology

The Romani people in New Zealand is a small community, in 2023 it was 219 people according to the census, mainly Romanichal immigrants from the United Kingdom along with more recent refugees from Europe. This community is actively addressing misunderstandings, especially concerning cultural appropriation by certain New Zealand "gypsy fairs" that use Roma-related terms and imagery commercially without genuinely representing Romani people. There are no dependable records of Roma arriving in New Zealand and continuing to identify as Romani. However, in his 1976 book Swagger Country, New Zealand writer Jim Henderson describes a group of immigrants who, before the First World War, would camp “in true Romany fashion” on the western edge of Christchurch. After spending a few quiet days apart from others, they would move on. The Roma were not seen again after the war, and may have been unable to cope with the suspicion toward foreigners during wartime.
