= Rēwena bread =

Type of sourdough bread from New Zealand

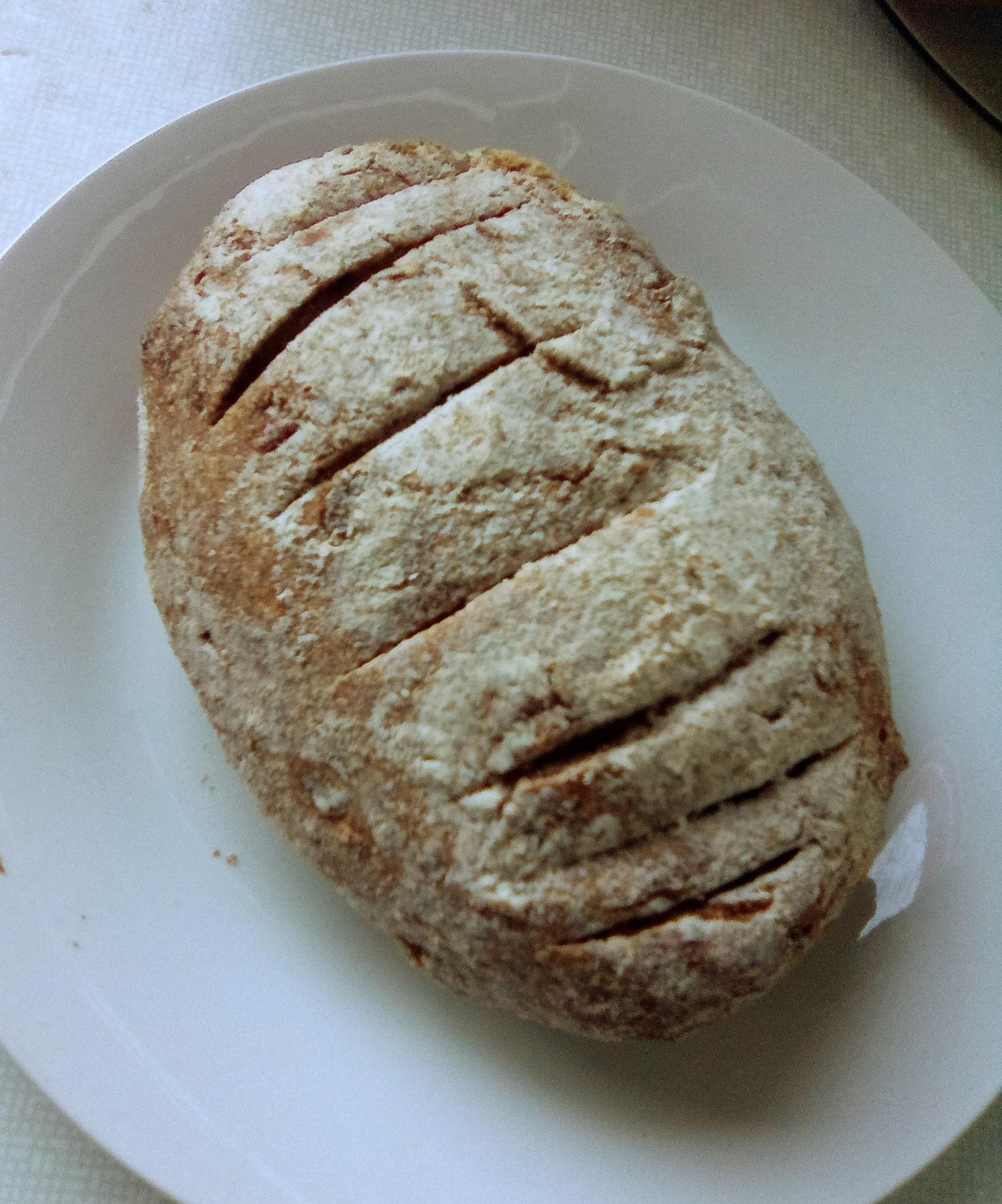
- Parāoa rēwena
- Alternative names: Māori bread, Parāoa rēwena
- Type: Bread
- Place of origin: New Zealand
- Associated cuisine: Māori cuisine
- Main ingredients: Potato, Flour, Water, Sugar, Salt
- Ingredients generally used: Kūmara

Rēwena bread or Māori bread (Māori: parāoa rēwena; literally 'flour leaven') is a type of sourdough bread from New Zealand. The bread is leavened with a fermented potato starter. It originated amongst the Māori people and is closely associated with Māori cuisine.

== Etymology ==
Rēwena is the direct transliteration of the word 'leaven' referring to the biological leavening ingredient used as a raising agent. Parāoa is the direct transliteration of the word 'flour' which also functioned to refer to bread or dough. Another example of bread developed by the Māori people of New Zealand is parāoa parai (literally 'flour fried').

== Preparation ==
Rēwena bread uses a pre-ferment starter, also called a "bug". It is created by boiling and mashing potatoes, then adding flour and sugar. Māori potatoes (taewa) are commonly used for this purpose. Kūmara, or sweet potatoes, may also be used. The mixture is then allowed to ferment from one to several days, depending on the ambient temperature and humidity.

As with most sourdough breads, the starter can be maintained and used indefinitely, as long as the yeast is kept alive with regular feeding. The potato starter and fermentation lends rēwena bread its characteristic sweet and sour taste. The starter is then mixed with flour and water, kneaded, and baked, usually in a round loaf.

== Cultural significance ==
Rēwena may also be used to break the Māori taboo associated with visiting a cemetery by crumbling the bread over hands in lieu of washing with water.

== See also ==
- Takakau
