= Kānga pirau =

Food

- Alternative names: Kānga wai, Kānga kōpiro
- Type: Porridge
- Place of origin: New Zealand
- Associated cuisine: Māori cuisine
- Main ingredients: Maize (corn)
- Variations: Kānga pungarehu

Kānga pirau (which translates literally from Māori as rotten corn), is a fermented maize (corn) porridge dish which is considered a delicacy by many Māori people of New Zealand.

== Etymology ==
The Māori word for Kānga is the direct transliteration of the english word for 'corn', while Pirau is a cognate of the Polynesian term "pilau", which describes "Decayed, stinking." and is derived from the Polynesian term "pilo" which describes "To stink (of excrement), putrid". It is also known alternatively as Kānga wai (water corn) and Kānga kōpiro (corn steeped in water).

== Production ==
The corn is traditionally prepared by soaking whole corn cobs in streams of running water in woven baskets for up to six weeks, until the corn kernels have settled to the bottom of the basket. In modern preparations, the corn is soaked in containers filled with water. The fermentation process results in the corn having a rather pungent aroma, hence the name rotten corn. Historically, this fermentation process was also used for the preservation of fish and crustaceans such as crayfish.

=== Serving ===
The resulting fermented corn is mashed before serving, and is often served with cream and sugar.

Alternatively, kānga pirau is served as a confection by beating it with egg, butter, sugar and a pinch of cinnamon, and baking it in the oven.

== History ==
The dish dates back to at least the 19th century.

== Variations ==
Kānga pungarehu (ash corn) is a similar dish made by Māori that involved processing maize that was then eaten as a porridge. The processing was done by boiling corn kernels together with wood ash which made nutrients more bioavailable by Nixtamalization instead of fermentation. Modern recipes tend to substitute wood ash with baking soda.

== See also ==
- Boza
- List of porridges
- Ogi
- Poi
- Pozol
