= List of Australian and New Zealand dishes =

Australia and New Zealand share many dishes due to similar colonial ties and shared publications.

== Main dishes ==
=== Breakfast ===
Name	Description	Image
Avocado toast	Common breakfast/brunch dish consisting of avocado on toast, often sourdough. It can be served mashed (‘smashed avo’) or sliced with a variety of additions; commonly including poached eggs, feta (often goat's), lemon, lime, tomato, pepitas etc. It is a common dish in cafes but also prepared at home. It is now a very popular dish internationally.	Avo toast melbourne (cropped)
Chilli scrambled eggs	Brunch dish of toast, topped with scrambled eggs and chilli. A staple in many modern cafes, each with a unique recipe.	Chilli Scrambled Eggs (cropped)
Eggs Benedict	Common in cafés, most Australian eggs Benedicts (colloquially "eggs Benny") differ greatly from the traditional, American breakfast staple. The most commonly seen version pairs pulled pork, poached eggs, hollandaise and sourdough toast. Most cafes have their own version with sriracha hollandaise, hash browns and ham hock being other common additions.	Eggs benedict melbourne standard (cropped)
Vegemite/Marmite toast	Toast smeared with Vegemite or Marmite and other toppings; butter, avocado, tomatoes and cheese are common additions. Can be served on sourdough in cafés.	
Wheat biscuits	Breakfast cereal biscuits made from malted wheat. Usually eaten with a combination of milk and fruit, honey or sugar. It is sold commercially packaged. Weet-Bix and Vita-Brits are the most popular brands.	

=== Salads ===
Name	Description	Image
Beetroot and pumpkin salad	Common salad combination, especially in cafés. Mixed with a variety of ingredients such as quinoa and kale.	
Cheese slaw	A salad which at its simplest consists of cheddar cheese, shredded carrot and mayonnaise. It is particularly associated with Broken Hill and rarely seen elsewhere. It can be used as a filling for sandwiches or as a side dish, particularly at barbeques.	
Curried rice salad	A salad served at barbecues, usually consisting of capsicum, raisins, apple and rice with a curry powder- and white vinegar-based dressing.	Curried rice salad (cropped)

=== Dips ===
Name	Description	Image
Cashew Parmesan dip	A type of dip, similar to pesto, consisting of cashew nuts blended with Parmesan mixed with other ingredients. Usually store-bought, variants include; spinach, capsicum, rocket, sweet chilli and basil.	Spinach cashew Parmesan dio (cropped)
Cob loaf	See also: Bread bowl A dish consisting of a hollowed-out cob loaf (a large round bread), with a dip inside. Recipes for this dish can vary family-to-family. Common fillings include spinach dip or caramelised onion and bacon dip. Commonly eaten at barbeques. Cob loaves have seen a recent surge in popularity with many new, creative versions appearing.	Cob loaf (cropped)
Kiwi onion dip	Reduced cream, onion soup packet mix and vinegar.	Kiwi Dip (cropped)

=== Breads ===
Name	Description	Image
Cheese and bacon roll	White bread roll topped with cheese and diced bacon. Common lunchbox filler.	Ham and cheese rolls aussie (cropped)
Damper	Traditionally baked on ashes of a campfire or a campfire oven. It was originally prepared by swagmen, drovers, stockmen and other travellers. Often served hot with golden syrup and lashings of butter. Modern variations such as cheese and bacon, wattleseed and spinach and feta have been increasing in popularity.	Rosemary beer damper (cropped)
Damper on a stick	A variant of damper, with the dough wrapped around a stick and cooked over an open fire. Typically prepared whilst on camping trips.	Twist bread made during a Scouts Camp
Pipe loaf, tank Loaf	A type of bread sold in bakeries. Baked in an enclosed corrugated tin. It is easily sliced and made into sandwiches.	Pipe loaf (cropped)
Pizza roll	A style of bread roll typically sold in bakeries and served at room temperature. The roll is topped with tomato sauce and cheese, along with additional toppings generally aligning with common pizza varieties. Also available to a lesser degree in scroll and pull apart varieties.	
Puftaloon	A quick bread fried in dripping, often served with jam.	
Pumpkin scone	Scones with mashed pumpkin through the dough.	Pumpkin Scones (cropped)
Parāoa parai / Fry bread	A Māori fried dough.	
Parāoa rēwena	A Māori bread made from fermented potato flour.	
Sweet chilli scroll	Savoury rolled bread bun with sweet chilli sauce and toppings such as cheese.	
Cheesymite scroll, Vegemite scroll	Savoury rolled bread bun filled with Vegemite and cheese and topped with cheese.	

=== Sandwiches ===
Name	Description	Image|-
Burger with the lot/Aussie burger/Kiwi burger	A burger variant which consists of a burger patty, bacon, egg, lettuce, cheese, beetroot slices and sometimes pineapple in a bun. Sold in fish and chip shops and burger shops.	Burger with the lot (cropped)
Cheese roll	A cheese roll (occasionally known by the older name of cheese roll-up) is created by covering a slice of bread in a prepared filling consisting mainly of grated or sliced cheese, and then rolling it into a tube shape before toasting. Cheese rolls are a very popular food in Otago and Southland in New Zealand, where they are commonly found as a menu item at cafeterias and similar food outlets.	Cheese rolls, Otago, New Zealand (cropped)
Continental roll	A Western Australian sandwich influenced by Italian cuisine. A crusty, chewy roll filled with mortadella, salami, coppa and vegetables such as pickled eggplant, sun-dried tomatoes, beetroot and grated carrot.	
Curried Egg sandwich	An egg sandwich made with chopped boiled eggs mixed with mayonnaise, and seasoned with a mild curry powder, often Keen's.	
Hot chicken roll	Long bread roll filled with rotisserie chicken and often gravy. Sold in chicken shops. Versions which add hot chips or supplant the gravy with mayonnaise are common.	Hot Chicken Roll (cropped)
Salad Sandwich	Sliced bread, butter or margarine and layers of shredded lettuce or alfalfa sprouts, shredded carrots, sliced or shredded cucumbers, and canned red beetroot.	
Sausage Sizzle/Sausage on bread/Sausage sandwich	A slice of white bread topped with a pork or beef sausage and usually grilled onions and tomato sauce. A sausage sizzle is a community event where the sales of sausage sandwiches are donated to a charitable cause. Sausage sizzles are usually found outside hardware stores and polling booths.	Sausage Sizzle - Snowy Valley Resort AUD3.50 (cropped)
Steak sanga	A thin piece of steak with bacon, fried onions, tomato, tomato sauce and lettuce between two slices of white toast. Cheese, beetroot, barbeque sauce and pineapple might also be added.	Aussie steak sandwich (croppe7d)
Strasburg/Devon/Fritz/Polony and sauce	A sandwich filled with sliced strasburg, devon, fritz or polony sausage and tomato sauce.	Strasburg sandwich (cropped)
Vegemite sandwich	Sandwich with butter and Vegemite. Cheese and tomato are common additions.	Vegemite sanga (cropped)

=== Savoury pastries ===
Name	Description	Image
Cheese and Spinach Roll	Puff pastry with cheese (usually feta and ricotta) and spinach.	Spinach and cheese pastry Aus (cropped)
Curried beef pie	A meat pie with curry powder and sometimes raisins in the gravy.	Curry beef pie (cropped)
Parrot pie	Settlers in Australia baked a pie containing parrot meat, by itself or with other meats.	
Meat pie	The most common style in Australia, often considered a "national dish". Gravy and minced beef encased in shortcrust pastry and topped with puff pastry.	Aussie meat pie (cropped)
Ned Kelly pie	A meat pie topped with bacon and egg instead of puff pastry.	
Pastie	An adaption of the British Pasty. Consists of a combination of beef, potato, carrot and onion enclosed in a D-shaped puff pastry pocket.	Australian pastie (cropped)
Scallop pie	A pie filled with scallops in a lightly curried, creamy sauce. Originally from and most popular in Tasmania.	Scallop pie (cropped)
Shepherd's pie/ Potato pie/ Cottage pie	Beef and Gravy with a suet base, topped with mashed potato instead of the usual puff pastry.	Australian cottage pie (cropped)
Steak and Cheese pie	Pie filled with diced or minced meat and cheese, often cheddar. The most popular style in New Zealand.	Steak and Cheese Pie (cropped)
Steak and pepper pie	Meat pie with beef chunks instead of mince and a heavily peppered gravy.	Pepper steak pie (cropped)
Vegetarian Pastie	Vegetarian version of a Pastie. Omits meat for extra vegetables.	Aussie Veggie Pastie (cropped)

=== Deep fried snacks ===
Name	Description	Image
Chiko Roll	Spring roll inspired snack invented by Frank McEncroe. Chiko Rolls contain Beef, barley, cabbage and other vegetables, partially pulped and deep-fried in a thick egg and flour pastry tube. Usually served in Fish and Chip shops.	
Corn Jack	Chiko Roll casing with a sweetcorn based filling. Typically deep fried and served at fish and chips shops.	Corn jack food (cropped)
Dagwood Dog	Battered saveloy sausage usually served dipped in tomato sauce at fetes and shows. Very similar to a Corn Dog.	Dagwood Dogs (cropped)
Dim sim	A dumpling consisting of minced meat, cabbage and seasonings. Primarily served in fish and chip shops, it can be served steamed or fried and is usually accompanied by soy sauce.	Fried and steamed dim sim (cropped)
Ham And Chicken Roll	An appetizer at Australian Chinese restaurants. Ham and chicken in a deep fried spring roll wrapper.	Ham and Chicken Roll Sydney
Hot Chips with Chicken Salt	Fried potato chips seasoned with chicken salt.	Hot chips with chicken salt (cropped)
Spring roll	A local type of Spring roll, Larger than the original Chinese version with a thicker, doughier pastry and partially pulped vegetables. Served at fish and chip shops, optionally with Chicken Salt.	Aussiespringroll (cropped)
Sweet chilli chicken tenders/strips	Chicken covered with sweet chilli coating which often contains puffed rice. Either deep-fried in chicken shops or oven baked at home.	Sweet chilli chicken tender (cropped)
Potato cake/potato scallop/potato fritter	Thin slices of potato, battered and deep fried. Served in fish and chip shops normally with the addition of chicken salt.	Potato cake (cropped2)

=== Fast food, pub meals ===
Name	Description	Image
Aussie Chicken Parmigiana	Breaded chicken topped with bacon, egg, cheese and either napoli or barbecue sauce. A "Parma night" Parmigiana available weekly in pubs.	Aussie Parma (cropped)
Aussie Pizza	An Australian pizza variant which is covered with Ham, bacon and egg. Australian-style pizza in general differs from Italian pizza with its thicker somewhat spongier base, less tomato and much more toppings.	Aussie pizza 2 (cropped)
Bolognaise Chicken Parmigiana	Chicken Parmigiana topped with a bolognese sauce. A "Parma night" Parmigiana available weekly in pubs.	
Chicken Parmigiana (Parma, Parmie)	Chicken Parmigiana exists in many other countries but the Australian version is unique. Breadcrumbed chicken is topped with ham and cheese, mozzarella, and/or cheddar (Parmesan is not common) and served with chips and salad. Its origin lies with southern Italian immigrants enriching the original eggplant (Parmigiana) in countries where meat was more affordable. It is a common pub meal. Most pubs have a weekly "Parma Night" or "Parmas of the world night" where a large variety of Chicken Parmigianas are available.	
Charcoal chicken	Chicken filled with a rice and herb stuffing, seasoned with a spice and herb rub and slowly cooked on a rotisserie spit over charcoal. It is commonly brine injected before being cooked. Served with hot chips and chicken salt.	Charcoal chicken (cropped)
Fish and chips	Fish and chips are a common take away food consisting of crumbed (breaded), battered or grilled fish, served with chips. They are considered by many to be a British invention. The first Australian fish and chip shop opened only ten years after the first British one. Australian fish and chips differ to British fish and chips in their choice of fish (Gummy shark (‘flake’) Blue Grenadier and barramundi being common), their batter and choice of accompaniment and seasoning. Malt vinegar is an uncommon addition whilst chicken salt is common.	Aussie flake (cropped)
Greek chicken parmigiana	Chicken Parmigiana topped with Greek inspired ingredients such as kalamata olives, tzatziki and grilled eggplant. A "Parma night" Parmigiana available weekly in pubs.	Greek Chicken Parma (cropped2)
Hawaiian chicken parmigiana	Chicken parmigiana with the addition of pineapple. A "Parma night" Parmigiana available weekly in pubs.	Hawaiian parma (cropped)
AB / halal snack pack	Common fast food; Chips (often seasoned with chicken salt), Doner or Gyros meat (chicken, lamb or both), and what is known as the "trinity" of sauces, garlic, bbq and chilli sauce. Cheese (often cheddar) is a common addition. In Adelaide the dish is known as an AB and it is supplemented with tomato sauce.	Hspchips (cropped)
Mexican Chicken Parmigiana	Chicken parmigiana with Tex-Mex style toppings such as pickled jalapeños, guacamole, salsa and tortilla chips. A "Parma night" Parmigiana available weekly in pubs.	Mexican parmigiana (cropped)
Pie floater	A Meat pie "floating" in pea soup. Popular in South Australia and to a lesser degree, Sydney. It is usually garnished with tomato sauce.	Pie floater
Surf and turf/ Reef and beef	Australasian version of the international beef and seafood combination. Steak topped with a creamy garlic prawn sauce.	Surf and Turf Australian (cropped)
Wedges with sour cream and sweet chilli sauce	Potato wedges served with both sour cream and chilli sauce. A common pub dish. Can be served "loaded" with cheese and bacon toppings.	Wedges with cheese and bacon (cropped)

=== Baked/grilled/fried dishes ===
Name	Description	Image
Colonial goose	A deboned, roast leg of lamb or mutton stuffed with honey, dried apricots, breadcrumbs, onion and herbs. Colonial Goose was popular in New Zealand and Australia in the early 20th century but is now quite rare.	
Crumbed cutlets	Lamb cutlets breadcrumbed and fried.	Crumbed Cutlets (cropped)
Crumbed sausages	Sausages covered in a breadcrumb batter pan fried.	
Garlic bugs	Moreton bay bugs or Balmain bugs grilled and served with a garlic herb butter. Chilli is a common addition.	Jimmy's On the Mall seafood dish for two
Hāngī	A traditional Māori method of cooking food using heated rocks buried in a pit oven, called an umu. Fish, kūmara, lamb, cabbage, potato, pork and pumpkin are common ingredients.	Hangi prepare (cropped)
Macadamia crusted meat	Various meats such as lamb or fish roasted with a macadamia crumb.	Macadamia crumbed lamb (cropped)
Paperbark fish	A northern Aboriginal Australian method of preparing fish, typically barramundi. The fish is wrapped in Paperbark and covered in hot coals. The paperbark imparts a unique smoky flavour to the dish. Vegetables and other meat may also be cooked in this manner.	
Rissoles	Large meatballs thickened with breadcrumbs. Most families have their own recipes. Beef is the most common but they can be made with other meats. They can be barbecued and served with tomato sauce and bread or baked and served with vegetables. They are similar to Frikadeller.	Meat rissoles. Easy as 1-2-3 (2179666929)
Slippery Bob	A historical dish made by frying kangaroo brains in emu fat.	
Whitebait fritter	Whitebait and whisked eggs pan-fried into patties. Served with lemon or lime.	Whitebait Fritter
Zucchini slice	Baked casserole dish consisting of eggs, cheddar cheese, grated zucchini, bacon, onion and self raising flour.	Zucchini slice (cropped)

=== Stewed/boiled dishes ===
Name	Description	Image
Apricot chicken	Chicken stew or casserole made with apricot nectar, onion and French onion soup packet mix. Simpler than American Apricot chicken it is usually served with rice, mashed potatoes or cous-cous. Different families will have their own recipes incorporating other vegetables and ingredients.	Aussie apricot chicken (cropped)
Billy kee chicken	Battered deep fried chicken glazed in a sauce made from Tomato Sauce and Worcestershire Sauce. Originating and found in Sydney Chinese restaurants.	
Bully beef and rice	A dish popular with Aboriginal Australians. Canned Corned beef stewed with vegetables and soy sauce, served with rice.	
Boil up	A traditional Māori meal. A Boil-up traditionally includes a balanced combination of meat and bones (e.g. pork), greens such as puha, watercress or cabbage, and kūmara or potatoes, boiled together.	Maori boil-up
Chow mein/Ki si min	A minced beef and cabbage stewed with soy sauce, onion, chicken noodle soup packet mix and curry powder. It is served with rice. "Chow mein" is a translation of the Taishanese "chau meing" which means stir-fried noodles. The name Chow Mein is both a misnomer and a hyperforeignism as it is neither noodle based or stir-fried. Some families call this dish Ki Si Min.	Ki si min (cropped)
Creamy prawns	Prawns cooked with cream and garlic with additional ingredients such as mustard, chicken stock powder, chili and wine. Typically served with rice or as a sauce to top Surf And Turf	Creamy prawns Australia (cropped)
Curried prawns	Curry of prawns cooked with vegetables, curry powder, tomato and milk.	Curried prawns (cropped)
Curried sausages	Stew consisting of sausages, onion, curry powder, peas and tomatoes, fruits such as sultanas and bananas are common additions.	Curried sausages (cropped)
Devilled sausages	A piquant sausage stew with tomato, onion and apple. Mustard, chilli, Worcester sauce, vinegar, raisins, spices and brown sugar are common additions. Typically served with mashed potatoes or rice.	Devilled Sausages (cropped)
Kangaroo steamer	A historical dish made in the English tradition of jugging, slowly cooking salt pork or bacon with minced or chopped kangaroo meat over several hours in a tightly closed vessel.	
Kangaroo tail soup	An Australian adaptation of oxtail soup, eaten commonly in the country during the colonial period. Kangaroo tail soup was mass produced for export during the mid-20th century.	
Semur chicken	A Torres Strait Islander dish of chicken slowly simmered in a soy sauce based broth with aromatics such as lemongrass, garlic, ginger and chilli. Usually served with Vermicelli. This is related to but distinct from Indonesian semur.	
Sop sop	A Torres Strait Islander dish of root vegetables such as yams, potato and pumpkin slowly cooked in coconut cream.	

=== Sausages ===
Name	Description	Image
Bull-boar	A sausage rarely found outside of Daylesford and Hepburn Springs, developed by Italian-Swiss gold field workers, It is a beef and pork sausage with garlic, wine and spices such as nutmeg, cinnamon and cloves. It can be dried into a type of Salami or cooked from raw.	
Bung fritz	A South Australian speciality; Bung Fritz (Often referred to as "Fritz") is a sausage consisting of seasoned pork, lamb and beef, lightly smoked and stuffed into a sheep's intestine (‘Bung’).	
Cabonossi/Kabana	A local adaption of the Polish Kabanos.	Kabana aussie (cropped)
Chicken sausage	Very simple chicken sausage. Minced chicken, seasoned with spices such as pepper. Typically barbecued.	Sausage Trio, Mash and Cabbage with Onion Gravy (cropped)
Belgium, Devon, Luncheon, Polony, Pariser, Windsor	A type of luncheon meat. A popular filling for sandwiches, often combined simply with tomato sauce. Its name is a rare example of extreme regionalism in the Australian dialect.	
Kransky	Australian rendition of the central European Carniolan sausage. Kranskies use more available cheeses to embellish its filling such as cheddar.	Cheese Kransky roll (cropped)
Kangaroo sausage	A sausage made with kangaroo meat. Typically barbequed.	
Saveloy	Spiced, cured sausage with a thick, red casing. A version of a British pork sausage style, the Australian variant contains both pork and beef whereas the New Zealand version also contains Lamb. The smaller, party sized versions are called either; Cheerios, Footy Franks or Little Boys. Saveloys are usually served boiled and accompanied by tomato sauce. A battered variant is called a Dagwood Dog, Pluto Pup or Sausage on a Stick.	Footy franks (cropped)
Strasburg	A Beef and Pork sausage, cooked and lightly smoked and seasoned. A type of "luncheon" meat, regularly served in a similar manner to Devon.	Strasburg sausage (cropped)

== Sweet dishes ==
=== Sweet breads ===
Name	Description	Image
Boston bun / Sally Lun bun	A large sweet, spiced bun topped with coconut icing and filled often with raisins. Served sliced and buttered and usually accompanied by tea.	
Coffee scroll	Sweet rolled bread bun with raisins and with either a coffee or vanilla flavoured icing, coloured brown or pink respectively.	Coffee scroll (cropped)
Custard scroll	Sweet rolled bread bun with a custard filling topped with icing and desiccated coconut.	Custard scroll (cropped)
Finger bun	Bread rolls topped with boston icing and sprinkled with toppings such as 100s & 1000s, desiccated coconut and marshmallows. A similar product in the UK is called an Iced Finger.	Finger bun (cropped)
Jubilee Twist	A Western Australian bun made from enriched, twisted dough filled with raisins and iced.	

=== Sweet pastries ===
Name	Description	Image
Cruffin	Pastry similar to that of a croissant, baked in a muffin tin, giving a Cruffin its distinctive muffin-like shape. Cruffins are often filled with flavoured creams (such as lemon). It was invented in Melbourne by Lune Crossainterie and its popularity has spread worldwide.	Cruffin (cropped)
Hot jam doughnuts	A freshly deep-fried doughnut rolled in sugar and filled with piping hot jam. A Melbourne speciality, Hot jam doughnuts are often eaten at sports events, especially AFL games.	Hot Jam Doughnuts (cropped)
Iced apple cake	Shortcrust pastry topped with vanilla icing and filled with stewed apples.	Apple cake Australian (cropped)
Kitchener bun	Fried or baked sweet yeasted dough (similar to that used for making doughnuts) bun split and then filled with raspberry or strawberry jam and cream, most often with a dusting of sugar on the top.	Kitchener bun
Neenish tart	Small, round, shortcrust tarts topped with two different coloured and flavoured halves of icing. In Australia it is filled with mock cream and jam and in New Zealand it is filled with Lemon Custard.	Neenish tart (cropped)
Pineapple glazed doughnut	A classic ring doughnut with a pineapple flavoured glaze.	Pineapple doughnut (cropped)
Pineapple tart	Variation of a Neenish Tart with pineapple jam and passionfruit icing.	Neenish tart passionfruit icing (cropped)

=== Sweet slices ===
Name	Description	Image
Apple slice	Stewed apples sandwiched between two layers of pastry.	Jelly slice (cropped)
Anzac caramel slice	Biscuit base, condensed milk caramel centre topped with an ANZAC biscuit inspired crumb made from rolled oats and coconut.	Anzac caramel slice (cropped)
Caramel slice	Desiccated coconut and biscuit base, sweetened condensed milk and golden syrup caramel filling and chocolate topping. The British version is called Millionaires Shortbread.	Aussie caramel slice (cropped)
Cherry Ripe slice	Slice inspired by the popular Cherry Ripe chocolate bar. Biscuit base, glace cherries, desiccated coconut and copha topped with dark chocolate.	Cherry ripe Slice (cropped)
Coconut slice / jam slice	Biscuit base with a preserved fruit filling, such as raspberry jam, topped with a coconut crumble. Louise slice is similar.	Coconut slice (cropped)
Fruit mince slice	Spiced fruit mince (as used in Mince pies) sandwiched between two layers of pastry.	Fruit mince slice (cropped)
Ginger Crunch	A chewy oat and golden syrup base topped with ginger flavoured icing. Ginger Crunch originated in New Zealand.	
Hedgehog slice	No-bake, refrigerator set slice with chocolate, desiccated coconut, crushed biscuits and sometimes sweetened condensed milk. Topped with chocolate.	Hedgehog slice aus (cropped)
Jelly slice	Biscuit base, cheesecake filling topped with a layer of jelly, usually either raspberry, strawberry or lime. This slice is set in the refrigerator.	Jelly slice au (cropped)
Lemon slice	Biscuit, sweetened condensed milk and desiccated coconut base topped with lemon icing.	Lemon Slice (cropped)
Louise cake / Louise slice	Shortcake base, topped with raspberry jam and coconut meringue. Originally from New Zealand.	Louise Slice (cropped)
Passionfruit slice	Crumbly coconut biscuit base topped with passionfruit icing.	
Peppermint slice	Baked desiccated coconut and flour base, peppermint-flavoured copha and icing sugar filling topped with dark chocolate.	Peppermint slice (cropped)
Rocky road	Marshmallows, glace cherries, desiccated coconut and peanuts bound by milk chocolate.	Rocky Road dessert
Vanilla slice	The Australian variant of the mille-feuille family of pastries. A thick layer of gelatin set custard on a pastry base with either vanilla or passionfruit icing.	Aussie vanilla slice (cropped)
Wagon Wheel slice	Biscuit base topped with a layer of jam, a layer of marshmallow and chocolate.	Wagon whee slice (cropped)
White Christmas	Rice bubbles, dried fruits (such as raisins), glace cherries and desiccated coconut bound with white chocolate. Usually eaten during the Christmas festive season.	

=== Cakes ===
Name	Description	Image
Chocolate ripple cake	An Australian version of an icebox cake; Chocolate ripple biscuits covered in cream and allowed to set, softening the biscuits.	Chocolate ripplecake (cropped)
Frog cake	Individual sized sponge cakes filled with jam, topped with mock cream and covered with fondant icing that is styled to resemble a frog with its mouth open. Originally from South Australia.	Frog cakes (cropped)
Jelly cake	Variant of a Lamington. Sponge cake dipped in partly set jelly and coated with desiccated coconut.	Mixed lamingtons (cropped)
Friand	A small cake made from almond meal, flour and fruit, derived from the French Financier.	Blueberry Friand, Australia, January 2006 (cropped)
Lamington	Sponge cake dipped in chocolate icing and coated with desiccated coconut. Lamingtons are usually individual sized but can be presented as a share-sized cake too. Versions filled with jam and cream are very common.	NZ Lamington
Lolly cake / lolly log	Malt biscuits, fruit puffs, condensed milk and butter, shaped into a log, rolled in coconut and refrigerated until set.	Lolly cake (2792116118)
Passionfruit sponge	Australian variant of a Victoria sponge; Circular sponge cake sandwiching a layer of cream, topped with passionfruit icing.	Passion fruit sponge (croppe2d)
Pavlova	Meringue cake topped with cream and fruits. Strawberries, kiwifruit and passionfruit are very popular toppings.	Pavlova dessert
Pikelet	A small pancake made fluffy with bi-carbonate of soda.	Pikelets (cropped)

=== Puddings ===
Name	Description	Image
Frog in a Pond	A Freddo Frog set inside of jelly. A very simple children's dessert.	
Flummery/ jelly whip	An old fashioned dessert of partially set jelly whipped to a foam consistency.	
Sago plum pudding	A variation of the British Christmas pudding; Steamed pudding with sultanas, rum and sago.	
Lemon delicious	Lemon rind and juice mixed into a pudding mixture and baked until the lemon separates, forming a two layered dessert.	Lemon delicious pudding - 4928369507 (cropped)
Lemon sago	Sago boiled with lemon juice and sweetened with sweeteners such as honey, sugar or golden syrup. Can be served with cream.	
Port wine jelly	Port wine flavoured jelly.	Port wine jelly (cropped)

=== Other sweets ===
Name	Description	Image
Apricot delight	A confection made from apricots, sugar and sometimes coconut.	Apricot delight2 (cropped)
Chocolate crackles	Rice bubbles set with copha, desiccated coconut and chocolate. Commonly shaped like a cupcake and sold at charity events, cake sales and fetes.	1D0AC9AB-BBCD-482choccrckle (cropped)
Chocolate spiders/Haystacks	Fried noodles bound by chocolate and peanut butter. Often served at children's parties.	Chocolate spiders (cropped)
Fairy bread	White buttered bread covered with 100s and 1000s Sprinkles. A very popular snack at children's parties.	Fairy bread
Golden GayTime/Cookie Crumble/Summer Delight	A toffee and vanilla ice cream dipped in compound chocolate, wrapped in honeycomb biscuits on a wooden paddlepop-stick.	Golden Gaytime2
Hokey pokey ice cream	Hokey pokey is a flavour of ice cream from New Zealand, consisting of plain vanilla ice cream with small, solid lumps of honeycomb toffee.	Hokey pokey ice cream (cropped)
Ice cream Christmas pudding	Fruit and spices used in a traditional plum/Christmas pudding mixed into softened vanilla ice cream and refrozen.	
Mango pancake	A dessert originating in Sydney Yum-cha restaurants. Refrigerated pancake rolled up with sugared cream and mango pieces.	Mango pancake
Pineapple fritter	Pineapple slices battered and dusted with cinnamon sugar. Common at fish & chip shops and chicken shops.	Pineapple fritter (cropped)

=== Chocolate and lollies ===
Name	Description	Image
Aniseed rings	Aniseed May contain gluten, milk & milk products, sesame, soy, peanuts, other tree nuts & sulphites.	Aniseed rings lolly (cropped)
Chocolate bananas	Banana shaped and flavoured lollies covered in chocolate.	Chocolate bananas (cropped)
Coconut rough	Shredded or desiccated coconut bound by milk chocolate.	Coconut rough (cropped)
Dark chocolate cherry bar	A blend of cherries and desiccated coconut covered in dark chocolate and shaped into a chocolate bar. Cherry Ripe is the most common brand.	Cherry-Ripe-Split (cropped)
Fruit sticks	Similar to confection to musk sticks, packaged together with various fruit flavours.	Fruit sticks fruit sticks (cropped)
Jaffas	Balls of milk chocolate covered with a thin layer of hard, orange-flavoured confectionery. The most notable brand is Jaffas.	Jaffa lollies (cropped)
Liquorice bullets	Milk chocolate in a bullet shape with a liquorice filling.	Chocolate bullets (cropped)
Minties	White and chewy mint flavoured confection.	
Musk sticks	Purple sticks with a musk flavouring. Musk is an aromatic, perfume-like flavour.	Musk sticks 09
Pineapple lumps	Soft, chewy pineapple flavoured confection, covered in chocolate.	Pascall Pineapple Lumps (cropped)
Raspberry bullets	White or milk chocolate shaped in a bullet shape with a raspberry liquorice filling.	Raspberry bullets (cropped)

=== Biscuits ===
Name	Description	Image
Afghan biscuit	Traditional New Zealand biscuit and is made from cocoa powder, butter, flour and cornflakes. It is then topped with chocolate icing and half a walnut. The origin of both the recipe and name are unknown, but the recipe has appeared in many editions of cookbooks sold in New Zealand.	Afghan MRD (cropped)
Anzac biscuit	A biscuit associated with ANZAC day made with rolled oats, golden syrup, flour, sugar, butter and desiccated coconut.	ANZAC biscuits
Belgium biscuits	Cinnamon biscuits with a raspberry jam filling and icing, sometimes topped with raspberry jelly crystals. Popular in New Zealand.	Batch of Belgian biscuits Edmonds Cookery Book 1998 (cropped)
Chocolate ripple	Wheat, chocolate and golden syrup biscuit. Used to make chocolate ripple cake.	Chocolate ripple biscuit (cropped)
Hokey Pokey Squiggles, Honeycomb Whirls	A biscuit developed by the Griffin's Foods. Biscuit topped with honeycomb buttercream and honeycomb pieces, covered with chocolate and yellow coloured white chocolate in a "squiggle" pattern.	Honeycomb whirl (cropped)
Kingston	Oat, coconut and honey biscuits sandwiching a chocolate buttercream centre.	Kingston biscuit (cropped)
Melting moment	Two crumbly and sweet biscuits sandwiching a buttercream centre. Many flavours are available with vanilla being the most common.	Melting Moments (cropped)
Milk Arrowroot	A plain biscuit made from Arrowroot flour.	Milk Arrowroot (cropped)
Monte Carlo	Golden syrup, honey and coconut biscuit sandwiching a vanilla cream, coated in a raspberry toffee.	Davidson plum Monte Carlo biscuit (cropped)
Scotch finger	A shortbread variant.	Scotch finger (cropped)
Wafer thin	Round wafer crackers made from wheat and cheese powders, eaten with dips and cheese. Variants exist, such as cracked pepper wafer thins.	Smoked trout rillettes (cropped)
Wagon Wheels	Two biscuits with marshmallow sandwich filling, covered in a chocolate-flavoured coating. A version adding jam is common.	Wagon wheel (cropped)
Yo-Yo	Version of a Melting Moment which adds custard powder and lacks cornflour in the biscuit.	Yo-yo biscuit (cropped)

== Other ==
=== Ingredients/products ===
Name	Description	Image
Chicken Salt	A seasoning invented in South Australia, it has a yellow colour and adds a sweet, umami richness to dishes. It is a blend of several spices such as paprika, garlic powder, curry powder and salt. Despite its name, chicken salt rarely contains any chicken products. It is typically used to season hot chips, potato cakes and Charcoal chicken.	Chicken salt photo (cropped)
Honeypot ant	Honeypot ants store sugar in their abdomens and are edible insects, serving as an occasional source of food and medicine for Indigenous Australians.	Honeypot ants
Kangaroo meat	Kangaroo meat is widely available and popular in Australia, It is commonly used in lieu of beef in a variety of dishes such as salads and burgers.	Kangaroo Meat
Macadamia nut	A nut native to Australia, it can be used in desserts, savoury dishes or eaten roasted as a snack.	Starr-081111-0454-Macadamia integrifolia-nuts-Makawao-Maui (24808809542)
Mānuka honey	Honey derived from the Mānuka tree native to Australia and New Zealand. It has a strong, earthy and slightly bitter flavour. It is commonly touted as a health food throughout the world.	Manuka honey in a bowl
Marinated Feta/Persian Feta/ Marinated Goat's Cheese	An Australian style of cheese. Feta style cheese or goats cheese are jarred and sealed in a marinade of olive oil and spices. These cheeses are used in dishes such as Avocado Toast, salads and Chilli Scrambled Eggs.	Persian fetta (cropped)
Rosella jam	A jam made from Rosella flowers. Produced in Queensland.	
Tomato sauce	A condiment consisting of concentrated tomatoes, sugar, vinegar and spices. It has a lower sugar and tomato content than the very similar sauce; Ketchup. Tomato sauce is commonly paired with pies, sausages and bread amongst other things.	Australian tomato sauce (croppe2d)
Toroī	A Māori pickle of mussels with boiled leaf vegetables and chilli.	
Witchetty grub	Large white larvae of several species of moths, they are a staple in the cuisines of Indigenous Australians.	Witchetty grubs

== Beverages ==
=== Hot beverages ===
Name	Description	Image
Billy tea	Black tea boiled over a campfire in a billycan with a Eucalyptus leaf for flavouring.	Billycan-campfire (cropped)
Chocolate Malt Powder	Powdered cocoa and malt with added nutrients. Prepared with either hot or cold milk. The best known brand is Milo.	Glass of milo (cropped2)
Flat white	Espresso and milk steamed to a microfoam texture in a small cup.	Flatwhite2 (cropped) (cropped)
Lemon myrtle tea	Tisane prepared with the native herb, lemon myrtle. It can be mixed with tea leaves.	Lemon Myrtle tea (cropped)
Long macchiato	Double espresso poured over a dash of hot water topped with a splash of steamed milk and a dollop of milk foam. Derived from Caffè macchiato.	Long Mac (cropped)
Magic	A double ristretto shot with microfoam textured milk. A Magic has less milk than a Flat White.	Magic coffee (cropped)
Piccolo	Espresso and steamed milk in a small glass. Similar to a Cortado.	Piccoloq (cropped)

=== Cold beverages ===
Name	Description	Image
Blue Heaven Milkshake	Vanilla and raspberry flavoured milkshake, dyed in a blue colour.	Blue heaven (cropped)
Creaming soda	Refers to either a brown, red or yellow coloured vanilla flavoured soft drink. The yellow variety is exclusive to Golden Circle. The red and brown varieties are more commonly produced. Sometimes red varieties are alternatively closer in flavour to a portello such as Bundaberg Burgundee creaming soda.	
Lemon, lime and bitters	A soft drink made by mixing lemonade, lime cordial and bitters. It is regularly sold pre-mixed.	Lemon, Lime and Bitters (cropped)
Passionfruit soda	Passionfruit flavoured soda. Common brands include Passiona and Kirks Pasito.	Pasito (cropped)
Pub squash / lemon squash	A lemon flavoured soft drink, Popular brands include Solo and TruBlu.	Solo drink (cropped2)
Portello	A grape and berry flavoured soft drink with flavour and appearance comparable to its namesake Port wine.	
Spider	Vanilla ice cream and (traditionally) either raspberry or lime soda. A type of ice cream float.	Lime spider aus (cropped)

=== Alcoholic beverages ===
Name	Description	Image
Australian lager	A Lager with an amber hue and slightly bitter flavour typically brewed with Pride Of Ringwood hops or their descendants.	Australian style lager (cropped)
Australian pale ale	A beer style with a balanced malty profile with a slightly floral hop profile and dry finish.	Australian pale ale (cropped)
Death Flip	A drink made from Tequila, Chartreuse, Jägermeister, and a whole egg. It was invented in Victoria.	
New Zealand draught	A beer brewed with lager yeast and a continuous fermentation process.	Beer (261408162) (cropped)
Pacific ale	A hazy pale ale brewed with malt, wheat and galaxy hops. Pacific ales have a tropical fruit aroma and a natural sweetness.	Pacific ale q (cropped)
Sparkling ale	A highly carbonated ale with low to medium maltiness and a lightly fruity flavour.	Sparkling ale (cropped)
Japanese slipper	Cocktail invented in Melbourne. Equal parts Melon Midori, Triple Sec and lemon juice shaken and served in a martini glass with a cherry garnish.	Japanese slipper (cropped)
