= Kangaroo tail soup =

Australian dish

Margaret Pearson's recipe for Kangaroo Soup (Tails), late-19th century

Kangaroo tail soup is an Australian adaptation of oxtail soup, using the tail of a kangaroo rather than cattle. Kangaroo tail soup was popular among settlers in Australia's colonial period, and beginning in 1869, recipes appeared in Britain in editions of Mrs. Beeton's Book of Household Management. Kangaroo tail soup continued to be served in Australian hotels until the turn of the century, and remained in Australian cookbooks until the late 1930s. As most Australians stopped eating kangaroo, kangaroo tail soup was mass produced and exported in the mid-20th century.

== History ==
Among early settlers, kangaroo meat was a valued and frequent part of diets, with kangaroo tail soup held in particularly high regard—one assessment given in 1888 by author Gordon Stables said "I know nothing more wholesome and nourishing, though many think it a little strong." Part of the appeal settlers found in kangaroo was the sport of hunting it offered, and following the English fox-hunting custom of presenting a lady with the tail of the fox, colonists presented women with the tail of a kangaroo after a hunt, which was then cooked into soup. One preparation for a kangaroo tail soup, given in the Australian Journal in 1879, read as follows:

In order to make this satisfactorily the meat must have been killed for some time or it will possess no distinguishing flavour; yet care must be taken not to use any portion of the meat tainted. If in the bush where kangaroo is plentiful, the stock may be made from the same instead of beef or veal. Cut up the meat into proper sized pieces and place into a saucepan with about 3 or 4 lbs of the meat from the leg or any other part, a slice of ham or lean bacon, two blades of mace, two onions, celery, marjoram and seasoning. Add 4 quarts of light stock; place on fire and cook gently until the tail is thoroughly done. Drain liquid and thicken it with brown roux to the proper consistence; cook gently for half an hour, take off all the scum or fat, put in a large glass of madeira or similar wine. A large tablespoon of red currant jelly and the juice of a lemon and pieces of the tail. Boil and serve.

A later version of the dish, printed in the 1898 Mrs Maclurcan's Cookery Book, included fresh ginger to provide brightness. This was uncommon in savoury dishes of the time, and may have represented the influence of Asian cooking. Beginning in 1869, the English book Mrs. Beeton's Book of Household Management included kangaroo tail soup among a set of dishes it presented as typical of the colonial Australian diet, including parrot pie and roast wallaby. It continued to feature in editions through at least 1892. In France, Alexandre Dumas enjoyed the dish, saying "the strong and muscular tail of the kangaroo makes the best and tastiest of soups".

Kangaroo tail soup continued to be eaten in the late 19th century, which was unusual at a time when kangaroo was becoming increasingly infrequent in the diets of Australians. In hotels, it continued to be served until the end of the century. (Note: For the 1956 Summer Olympics hosted in Melbourne, the Hotel Oxford served kangaroo tail soup.) In the years following Australia's Federation in 1901, kangaroo tail soup was often regarded as an essentially Australian dish, at a time when recipes were sometimes used as a medium for expressing national sentiment; in a 1928 copy of the West Australian, kangaroo tail soup was identified as "a national dish if there is one". One recipe in this vein appeared in the 1911 cookbook Kookaburra Cookery Book, including a dollop of native currant jam. Recipes continued to appear in Australian cookbooks into the late 1930s. By this time, eating kangaroos was considered taboo in Australia, a perception that was not shared internationally. By the 1960s, MasterFoods was mass-producing and exporting kangaroo tail soup, and the Australian airline Qantas served the dish inflight.

== See also ==
- List of Australian and New Zealand dishes
- List of soups
- Other kangaroo dishes:
  - Kangaroo steamer
  - Slippery Bob

== Sources ==
- Black, Sarah (2007). "Community Cookbooks, Women and the 'Building of the Civil Society' in Australia, 1900–38". In Kirkby, Diane; Luckins, Tanja (eds.). Dining on Turtles: Food Feasts and Drinking in History. Basingstoke, Hampshire & New York: Palgrave Macmillan. ISBN 978-1-349-35496-2.
- Cushing, Nancy (2016). "The interspecies entanglements of eating kangaroo, 1788–1850". History Australia. 13 (2). doi:10.1080/14490854.2016.1186003.
- Dumas, Alexandre (2013) [1873 in French]. Colman, Louis (ed.). Alexandre Dumas' Dictionary of Cuisine. Abingdon, Oxon: Routledge. ISBN 978-0-710-30839-9.
- Fahey, Warren (1992). When Mabel Laid the Table: The Folklore of Eating and Drinking in Australia. Sydney: State Library of New South Wales Press. ISBN 0-7305-8900-5.
- Lambeth, Evelyn (2024). "Settler Colonial Classifications of Edibility". Gastronomica. 24 (2). doi:10.1525/gfc.2024.24.2.43.
- Luckins, Tanja (2007). "Competing for Cultural Honours: Cosmopolitanism, Food, Drink and the Olympic Games, Melbourne, 1956". In Kirkby, Diane; Luckins, Tanja (eds.). Dining On Turtles: Food Feasts and Drinking in History. Basingstoke, Hampshire & new York: Palgrave Macmillan. doi:10.1057/9780230597303_6. ISBN 978-1-349-35496-2.
- O'Brien, Charmaine (2016). The Colonial Kitchen: Australia 1788-1901. London: Rowman & Littlefield. ISBN 978-1-4422-4982-0.
- Santich, Barbara (2012). Bold Palates: Australia's Gastronomic Heritage. Kent Town, South Australia: Wakefield Press. ISBN 978-1-74305-113-9.
- Santich, Barbara (2013) [1996]. Looking for Flavour (Expanded ed.). Kent Town, South Australia: Wakefield Press. ISBN 978 1 74305 207 5.
- Santich, Barbara (2014). "Kangaroos". In Davidson, Alan; Jaine, Tom (eds.). The Oxford Companion to Food (3rd ed.). Oxford University Press. ISBN 978-0-19-967733-7.
- Wessell, Adele; Jones, Andrew (2023) [2011]. "Faith-based homespace: Decoding good taste in a monastery". In Cramer, Janet M; Greene, Carlnita P; Walters, Lynn M (eds.). Food as Communication / Communication as Food. New York: Peter Lang Publishing Inc. ISBN 978-1-63667-381-3.
