= Bacon roll =

A bacon roll is either:

- a bacon wrapped food comprising a roll made of bacon with various fillings inside it
- a bacon sandwich comprising a roll sandwiching bacon inside it

== See also ==
- cheese and bacon roll – Bread snack
