= Parrot Pie =

Parrot Pie may refer to:

- Parrot pie, a dish historically eaten in Australia
- Parrot Pie, a 1973 one-act opera for children by Peter Tahourdin
- Parrot Pie, a 1927 book of parodies by William Kean Seymour
- Parrot Pie for Breakfast : an Anthology of Women Pioneers, a 1999 book by Jane Robinson
