= Civet (disambiguation) =

A civet is small, mostly arboreal mammal native to the tropics of Africa and Asia.

The term may also refer to:

- Civet (perfumery), extracted from perineal glands of the civet
- Civet (band), a punk rock band from Long Beach, California
- CIVETS, an acronym for the nations Colombia, Indonesia, Vietnam, Egypt, Turkey, and South Africa
- Jugged food stewed in an upright container (such as Jugged Hare, known as civet de lièvre in France)
