= Bundaberg East =

Bundaberg East Bundaberg, Queensland
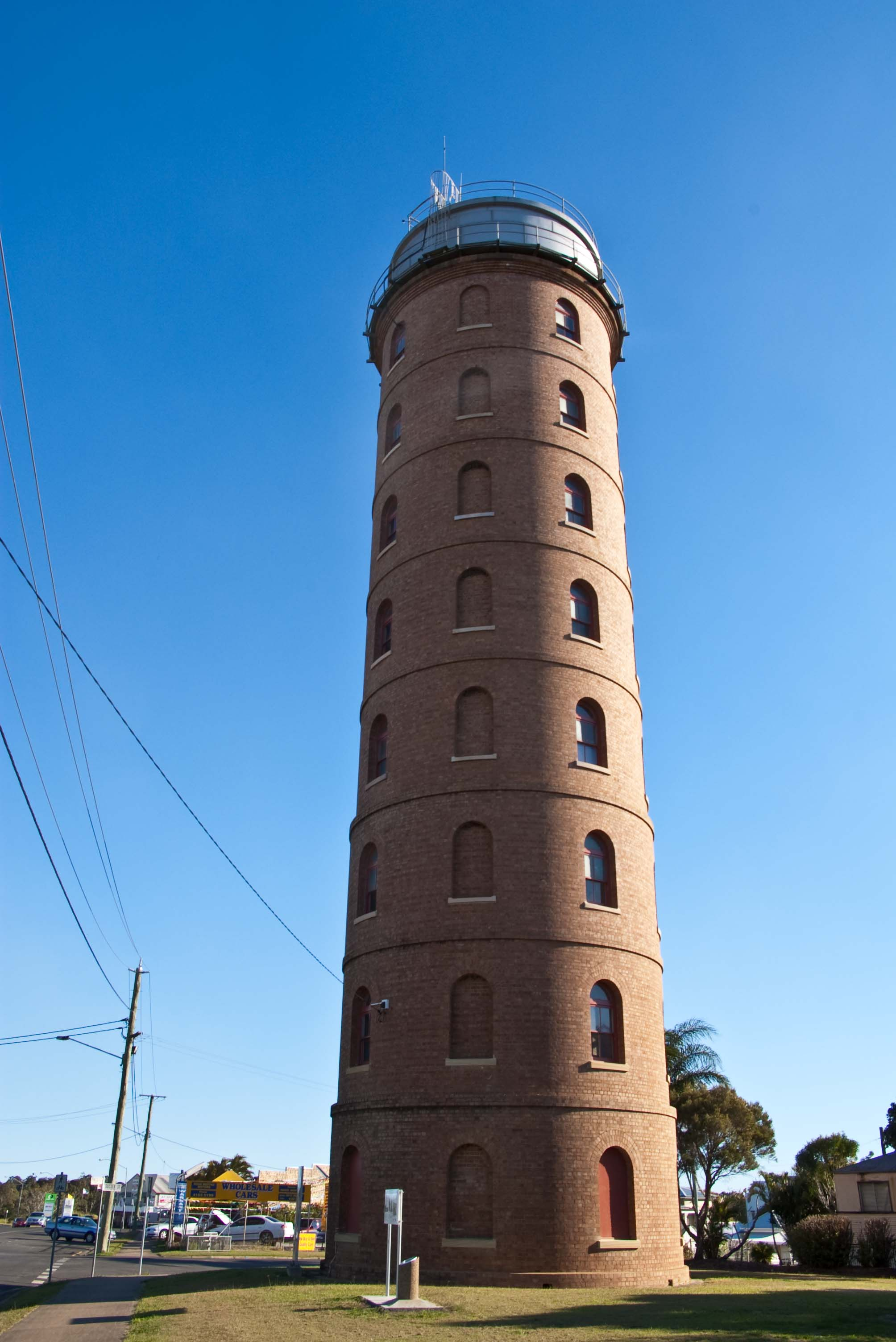
- View looking West. The East Water Tower was erected in 1901–1902 to provide suitable water pressure as part of Bundaberg's new reticulated water system.

- Coordinates: 24.8594°S 152.3747°E
- Population: 2,839 (2021 census)
  - Density: 617/km^{2} (1,598/sq mi)
- Postcode(s): 4670
- Area: 4.6 km^{2} (1.8 sq mi)
- Time zone: AEST (UTC+10:00)
- Location: 3.7 km (2 mi) ENE of Bundaberg; 368 km (229 mi) NNW of Brisbane
- LGA(s): Bundaberg Region
- State electorate(s): Bundaberg
- Federal division(s): Hinkler
Suburbs around Bundaberg East:
Bundaberg North	Kalkie	Kalkie
Bundaberg Central	Bundaberg East	Kalkie
Bundaberg South	Kepnock	Ashfield

Bundaberg East is a suburb of Bundaberg in the Bundaberg Region, Queensland, Australia. In the 2021 census, Bundaberg East had a population of 2,839 people.

== History ==
The Millaquin Sugar Mill opened in 1881, extracting the juice from sugarcane, expanding to sugar refining in 1885.

A Government land sale of eighty allotments was advertised for auction by W. E. Curtis on 6 June 1882. The map advertising the auction stated the allotments were down river a mile from Bundaberg and fronted Scotland Street, Princes Street and George Street, located near Cran & Co's Refinery and Manchester & Scott's Saw Mills.

St Matthew's Anglican Church Bundaberg East was opened in 1906 and closed in 1975. It was sold because of population drift.

Bundaberg East State School opened on 1 July 1886.

In 2005, Bundaberg Brewed Drinks opened their tourist facility, the Bundaberg Barrel, one of Australia's big things, in Bundaberg East. The Barrel has a 3D hologram video, interactive displays on the brewing process and taste testing.

== Demographics ==
In the 2011 census, Bundaberg East had a population of 2,810 people;

In the 2016 census, Bundaberg East had a population of 2,784 people.

In the 2021 census, Bundaberg East had a population of 2,839 people.

== Heritage listings ==
Bundaberg East has a number of heritage-listed sites, including:

- Kennedy Bridge, Bourbong Street (24.8637°S 152.3575°E)
- Saltwater Creek Railway Bridge, Quay Street (24.8627°S 152.3572°E)
- East Bundaberg Water Tower, 17 Sussex Street (24.8624°S 152.3658°E)

== Education ==
Bundaberg East State School is a government primary (Prep–6) school for boys and girls at 33 Scotland Street (24.8622°S 152.3725°E). In 2018, the school had an enrolment of 587 students with 41 teachers (36 full-time equivalent) and 36 non-teaching staff (22 full-time equivalent). It includes a special education program.

There is no secondary school in Bundaberg East. The nearest secondary schools are Kepnock State High School in neighbouring Kepnock to the south and Bundaberg State High School in neighbouring Bundaberg South to the south-west.

== Amenities ==
Bundaberg Wesleyan Methodist Church is at 1A Princess Street (24.8638°S 152.3647°E). It is part of the Wesleyan Methodist Church of Australia.

== Attractions ==
The Bundaberg Rum Distillery is at Hills Street (24.8536°S 152.3673°E). It offers tours, a museum and tastings.

Bundaberg Brewed Drinks is at 147 Bargara Road (24.8525°S 152.3812°E). It offers tours and tastings.
