= Kangaroo steamer =

Historical Australian dish

Kangaroo steamer is a historical Australian dish made in the English tradition of jugging, slowly cooking salt pork or bacon with minced or chopped kangaroo meat over several hours in a tightly closed vessel. It is first mentioned in the 1820s in an account of Tasmania, with which the dish became closely associated, described in 1843 by Charles Rowcroft as "the national dish of the Van Diemen's Land bush". Among Australian writers of the 19th century, the dish was regarded as excellent, although by the end of the century it had become increasingly rare, and is obsolete as an everyday dish.

== Preparation ==
Kangaroo steamer is made in the English tradition of jugging, in which game animals are cooked slowly in a closed earthenware vessel. In preparing the dish, kangaroo meat is minced or otherwise finely chopped and combined with salt, pepper, and salt pork or bacon which provides fat absent in lean kangaroo meat. A small amount of liquid is sometimes added, although Henry Melville argued in the mid-19th century that "this is unnecessary, as the flesh soon floats in its own rich gravy". Left by an open fire or hearth for hours with the lid tightly shut, the ingredients steam and braise and the meat becomes tender.

In a version given by Edward Abbott in 1864, ketchup, milk, and shredded onion appear, and Abbott recommends serving with a sweet condiment of "jelly". Other preparations served the dish with sippets or rice. Kangaroo steamer could last twelve months after cooking, and it was often bottled for later eating. In the modern day, Jacqui Newling recommends preparing the dish over several days to allow the flavours to meld.

== History ==
A reference to kangaroo steamer first appears in an 1820 account of Tasmania, within the writing of Charles Jeffreys. By this time it was already well-established. Jeffreys wrote: "their meal consisted of the hind-quarters of a kangaroo cut into mince-meat, stewed in its own gravy, with a few rashers of salt pork, this dish is commonly called a steamer". Kangaroo steamer was popular in Tasmania and New South Wales, where it was eaten throughout the 19th century. Kangaroo was considered tastier than other Australian game, and the abundance of the animal, cheap price of salt pork and familiarity of the underlying method contributed to the dish's appeal.

Kangaroo steamer was closely associated with Tasmania, and in 1843 it was described by Charles Rowcroft as "the national dish of the Van Diemen's Land bush". Several Australian writers of the era spoke highly of kangaroo steamer including Melville, who in 1851 attested "of all the dishes ever brought to table, nothing equals that of the steamer". In the UK, it featured at the first public dinner of the Acclimatisation society in 1862, which hoped to introduce foreign dishes to British palates. Kangaroo steamer was served in the Australian section, alongside rosella jelly, kangaroo ham, and "meat biscuits", and was heavily salted, probably to obscure the taste of the steamer which had gone off after being bottled incorrectly. Two years later, Abbott included three recipes in his book The English and Australian Cookery Book.

Kangaroo faded from diets in the late 19th century as the population urbanised, tastes changed, mutton and beef production expanded, and kangaroo populations dropped. Kangaroo steamer does not appear in several cookbooks from this time which were generally written for an urban audience, with one exception being The Goulburn Cookery Book (1899) by Mrs Rutledge, which was written for a rural audience. Its recipe for "Steamed Kangaroo or Wallaby" closely resembles Abbott's 1864 preparation, instructing readers:

Cut the kangaroo into pieces about the size of a small veal cutlet, and slice the pork or bacon. Put a layer of pork at the bottom of a gourmet boiler or earthenware jar, then a layer of kangaroo, then onions. Season with salt and plenty of pepper. Continue these layers until all is used. Cover with a cloth, and then put on the lid; see that it fits well, so that no steam escapes. Put the pot in a saucepan half full of boiling water, and cook for 4 hours. Half an hour before serving, add the ketchup, and 20 minutes afterwards a claret glass of port. Serve with a dish of hot boiled rice. (Note: Mrs Rutledge's preparation required the following quantities of ingredients: "Kangaroo or wallaby, salt pork or bacon, 2 or 3 onions, 1/2 wineglass of ketchup, 1 claret glass of port wine, pepper, salt")

Among the last recipes for kangaroo steamer in popular cookbooks appeared in Emily Futter's 1926 book Australian Home Cooker, and in a 1931 edition of the Golden Wattle Cookery Book, published in Perth, Western Australia. The last mention identified by the food historian Barbara Santich came in 1936, in The CWA Cookery Book and Household Hints. It contained kangaroo and bacon, but otherwise diverged from earlier preparations, more closely resembling the then-popular Aberdeen sausage. Santich remarks that "Abbott and his colonial mates would never recognise it as a succulent 'steamer'." In the modern day, dictionaries describe the kangaroo steamer as "obsolete".

== See also ==
- List of Australian and New Zealand dishes
- Kangaroo tail soup
- Slippery Bob

== Sources ==
- Bannerman, Colin (1998). Acquired Tastes: Celebrating Australia's Culinary History. Canberra, ACT: National Library of Australia. ISBN 0-642-10693-2.
- Fletcher, Nichola (2005). Charlemagne's Tablecloth: A Piquant History of Feasting. New York: St. Martin's Press. ISBN 978-0-312-34068-1.
- Gross, Jan (May 2010). "The Golden Wattle Cookery Book". Petits Propos Culinaires: 40–59. doi:10.1558/ppc.29042.
- Lambeth, Evelyn (2024). "Settler Colonial Classifications of Edibility". Gastronomica. 24 (2). doi:10.1525/gfc.2024.24.2.43.
- Newling, Jacqui (2016). "Kangaroo Steamer". In Newton, John (ed.). The Oldest Foods on Earth. Sydney, New South Wales: NewSouth Publishing. ISBN 978-1-742-23437-3.
- O'Brien, Charmaine (2016). The Colonial Kitchen: Australia 1788-1901. London: Rowman & Littlefield. ISBN 978-1-4422-4982-0.
- Santich, Barbara (1990). "Feed the Man Meat". In Walker, Harlan (ed.). Oxford Symposium on Food & Cookery, 1989: Staple Foods. London: Prospect Books. ISBN 0-907-32544-0.
- Santich, Barbara (2012). Bold Palates: Australia's Gastronomic Heritage. Kent Town, South Australia: Wakefield Press. ISBN 978-1-74305-113-9.
- Santich, Barbara (2013) [1996]. Looking for Flavour (Expanded ed.). Kent Town, South Australia: Wakefield Press. ISBN 978 1 74305 207 5.
- Santich, Barbara (2014a). "Australia". In Davidson, Alan; Jaine, Tom (eds.). The Oxford Companion to Food (3rd ed.). Oxford University Press. ISBN 978-0-19-967733-7.
- Santich, Barbara (2014b). "Kangaroos". In Davidson, Alan; Jaine, Tom (eds.). The Oxford Companion to Food (3rd ed.). Oxford University Press. ISBN 978-0-19-967733-7.
- Symons, Michael (1982). One Continuous Picnic. Adelaide, South Australia: Duck Press. ISBN 0-9593047-0-3.
