= East Bundaberg Water Tower =

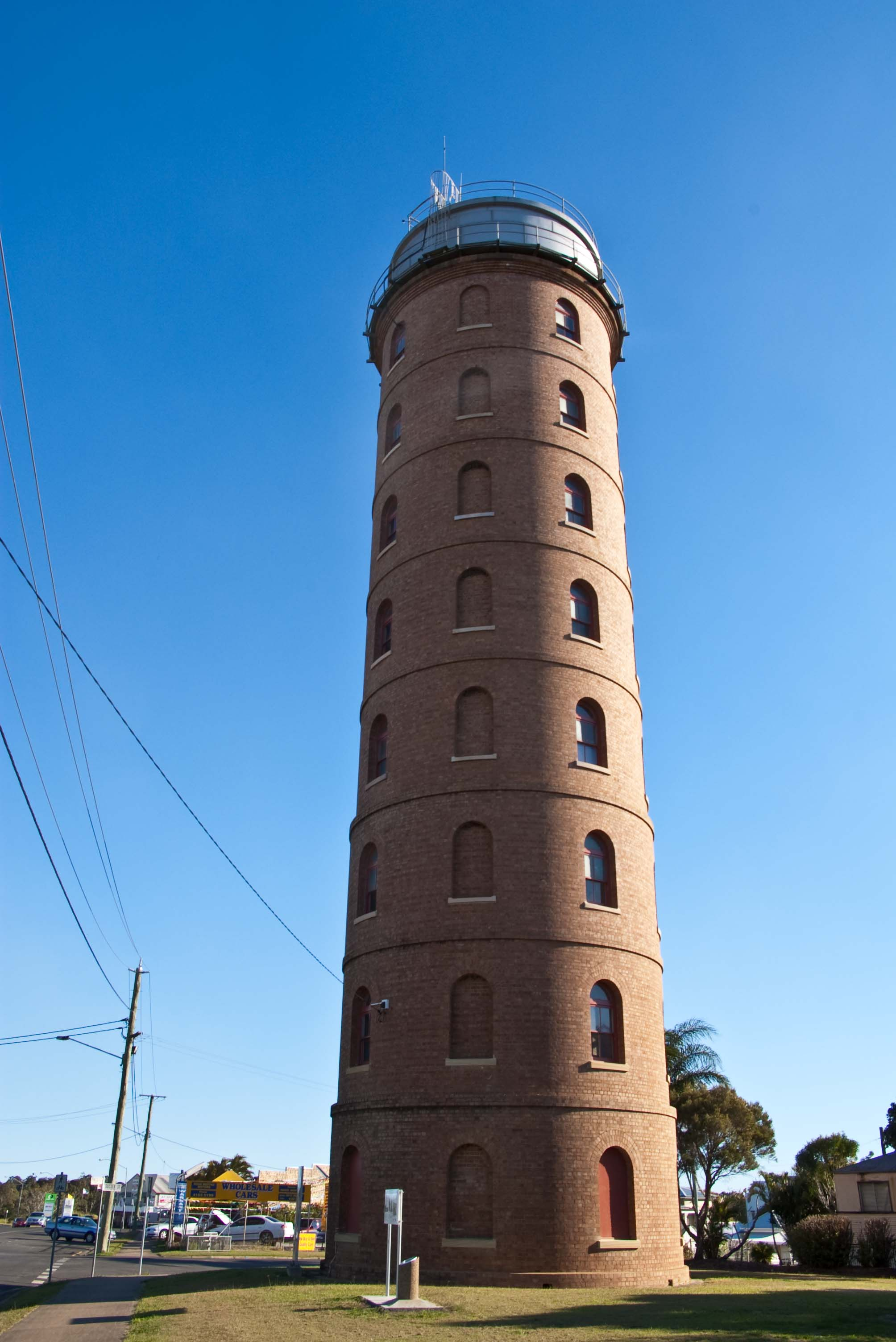
- East Bundaberg Water Tower, 2011

- Location within Queensland Location within Australia
- 24.8624°S 152.3658°E
- Location: 17 Sussex Street, Bundaberg East, Bundaberg Region, Queensland, Australia

History
- Design period: 1901
- Built: 1902

Site notes
- Architect: James Baillie Henderson

Queensland Heritage Register
- Official name: East Water Tower
- Type: state heritage (built)
- Designated: 21 October 1992
- Reference no.: 600369
- Significant period: 1900–1902 (fabric); 1890s–1900s (historical)
- Builders: Neils Carl Steffensen

East Bundaberg Water Tower (also known as the East Bundy Water Tower) is a heritage-listed water tower at 17 Sussex Street, Bundaberg East, Bundaberg Region, Queensland, Australia. The tower is the only circular brick water-tower in Queensland and was designed by James Baillie Henderson and built from 1901 to 1902. It was added to the Queensland Heritage Register on 21 October 1992.

== History ==
The East Bundaberg Water Tower was erected for the Bundaberg Municipal Council in 1901–1902 to provide suitable water pressure as part of Bundaberg's new reticulated water system.

The Burnett area was first settled by Europeans as a series of pastoral runs in the 1840s and 50s. In the late 1860s, as good agricultural land around Maryborough began to be scarce, agriculturalists and timbergetters became interested in land on the navigable Burnett River to the north. The foundation settlers of Bundaberg selected land in 1867–68 under the "Sugar and Coffee Regulations" stemming from the Crown Lands Alienation Act of 1860s which aimed to promote agriculture and closer settlement. The site of Bundaberg was officially surveyed in 1869. Coastal traffic grew, and copper was first mined at Mt Perry in 1871, which enabled Bundaberg to develop as a port and supply centre, in spite of competition from Maryborough for this trade. Although the higher southern bank of the river was officially surveyed as the town site, both sides soon developed wharves and buildings and were initially linked by ferry. In the 1870s the first bridges were built, as ferries could no longer cope with increasing traffic across the river. It was in the 1880s, however, with the successful establishment of the sugar industry in the region, that Bundaberg boomed. Handsome and substantial masonry buildings began to rise in the town as evidence of its growing importance and prosperity. Important civic works were also carried out such as the installation of gas street lighting and the sealing of major roads with asphalt. It was in this period of civic development that the Bundaberg Municipal Council considered the provision of a reticulated water supply.

Bundaberg's water supply was initially derived from a series of water holes and lagoons around the settlement. By the 1880s, as the town developed, the provision of a reticulated water supply became important, not only for domestic use, but to allow road sprinkling to keep down dust and to make it possible to fight fires, a major cause of destruction where timber buildings crowded commercial areas. The colonial government in September 1887 gazetted loan conditions for a reticulated town water system for Bundaberg. A scheme to bring water from the dam on the permanent lagoon at Baldwin Swamp in East Bundaberg to a storage reservoir at Tantitha Park, utilizing an elevated tank to improve water pressure, was presented to the council by Councillor W H McCann. His scheme formed the basis of plans prepared in 1889 by W C Clements, a hydraulic engineer based in Rockhampton.

The plans were submitted to Brisbane for government appraisal. The government engineer, J B Henderson, thought them unsuitable. Amongst other suggestions for improvement he recommended a brick water tower rather than the simple elevated tank proposed. An amended proposal was drawn up which followed this suggestion but did not go ahead. In April 1896, Henderson travelled to Bundaberg and met the Mayor and Councillors to discuss the water supply and appears to have been asked by them to take on the work.

James Baillie Henderson was born in London in 1836 and trained as an engineer in Scotland. He arrived in Victoria in 1861 and worked on the Coliban water scheme and the water supply system for Bendigo. Moving to Queensland in 1878, he became resident engineer of northern waterworks and in 1883 took up the new position of government hydraulic engineer. He travelled widely in Queensland and was instrumental in the discovery and exploitation of artesian water. He instituted Queensland's first flood warning system and retired in Brisbane in 1916.

In October 1898 a detailed proposal was supplied to the Council costed at £18,804 plus working expenses. The Council then applied for a loan of £20,000 which was secured in the Parliamentary estimates for 1899–1900. Tenders were called for the pipes in September 1899 and for the tower in December of that year, but were not accepted for either job because the costs of labour and materials had risen. The Council consequently obtained a further loan and accepted a tender from local contractor Neils Carl Steffensen at a cost of £3859.

Steffensen began work on the tower in April 1900 although his work was delayed by difficulties in sourcing suitable bricks. In order to obtain the quality and uniformity necessary for this project, bricks were obtained from Virginia brickworks in Brisbane. The tower was completed in 1902 and was considered a masterpiece of brickwork. The Bundaberg Foundry made the tank, pipes and fittings. The system brought water from the Baldwin Swamp utilizing a steam pump located in a pump house near the edge of the swamp. It was pumped up the tower to the holding tank, the height of which provided pressure by gravity. Water was supplied to the major sections of the town by pipes and hydrants were constructed in the main street in 1902.

Locating an underground water source solved problems with the quality of the water initially obtained from an open waterhole at the swamp. A large well supplied by 4 bores was constructed and by 1907, 16,000 imperial gallons (73,000 L; 19,000 US gal) daily were being supplied. Subsequently, other water towers were built around Bundaberg, although the east tower remains the most striking in appearance.

Because of the flat nature of the terrain, the tower is a landmark and in its early years, people climbed the tower to obtain views of the area. There are also local stories of children playing racing games up and down its staircase. Proof of this unofficial public use remains in the form of graffiti scratched on the interior walls of the tower. These date from the early 1920s until the latter half of the 20th century.

The tank remains a water storage facility, but has been roofed and was recently lined with concrete.

== Description ==
The East Bundaberg Water Tower is a cylindrical brick tower topped by a steel tank and is situated on an open grassed area at the corner of Sussex and Princes Streets.

It is constructed of red-brown glazed bricks which are tuck pointed and set on concrete footings with an in situ concrete slab. The tower supports a circular steel water tank and is 35 metres (115 ft) high with a diameter of 9.5 metres (31 ft) at the base. The walls of the tower taper from a thickness of 91.5 centimetres (36.0 in) at the base, to 35.5 centimetres (14.0 in) at the top of the structure. There is a ground level entrance on the north–south axis.

The tower has 8 storeys, each being indicated by a band of projecting bricks and has four windows with round-headed arches interspersed with four blind windows of the same form at each level.

The steel tank on the top of the tower is circular with a dished base and is approximately 3 metres (9.8 ft) deep. It rests on a sandstone plinth. There is a timber framed access walkway with a handrail around the base of the tank.

The interior has timber floors supported by timber framing and linked by a timber staircase, which runs around the exterior walls of the tower. The interior is plastered and has timber framed doors and windows with sandstone sills.

The tower is surrounded by lawn. There are perimeter plantings to adjacent blocks but no fence.

== Heritage listing ==
East Bundaberg Water Tower was listed on the Queensland Heritage Register on 21 October 1992 having satisfied the following criteria.

The place is important in demonstrating the evolution or pattern of Queensland's history.

The East Bundaberg Water Tower was a key element in Bundaberg's first reticulated water system, constructed in the early 1900s. It marks an important stage in the development of the city's infrastructure and helps to illustrate the development of Bundaberg as a major regional city serving one of Queensland's most significant sugar-growing regions.

The place demonstrates rare, uncommon or endangered aspects of Queensland's cultural heritage.

It is the only circular brick water tower known in Queensland and is a good and intact example of a late 19th century technology, being designed to increase water pressure to allow a reticulated water supply system to operate effectively in a very flat terrain.

The place is important in demonstrating the principal characteristics of a particular class of cultural places.

It is the only circular brick water tower known in Queensland and is a good and intact example of a late 19th century technology, being designed to increase water pressure to allow a reticulated water supply system to operate effectively in a very flat terrain.

The place is important because of its aesthetic significance.

The East Bundaberg Water Tower is a well-executed and distinctive structure that has a strong visual presence in a flat and open townscape. Its design transcends the purely functional and the tower appears to have been intended as a pleasing element in the landscape. The exterior suggests a Renaissance influence in its use of arched actual and blind windows encircling each floor level.

The place has a special association with the life or work of a particular person, group or organisation of importance in Queensland's history.

The water tower has a strong connection with the life and work of James Baillie Henderson, the first government hydraulic engineer in Queensland.
