= Saltwater Creek Railway Bridge =

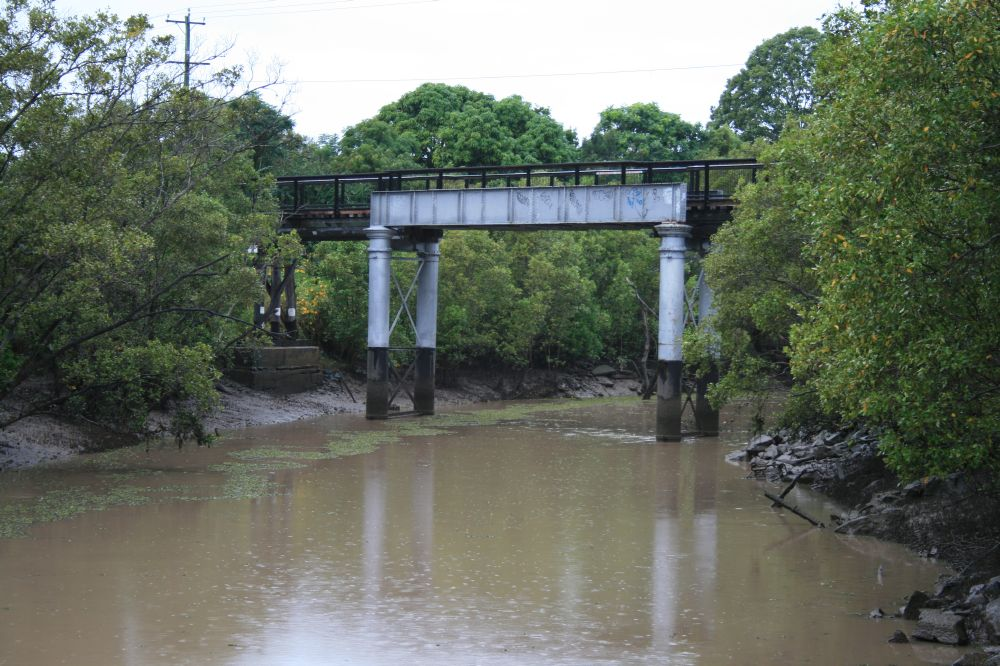
- Saltwater Creek Railway Bridge, 2009

- Location within Queensland Location within Australia
- 24.8627°S 152.3572°E
- Location: from Quay Street, Bundaberg Central to Bundaberg East, Bundaberg, Bundaberg Region, Queensland, Australia

History
- Design period: 1870s–1890s (late 19th century)
- Built: 1894–1894

Queensland Heritage Register
- Official name: Saltwater Creek Railway Bridge, Millaquin Bridge
- Type: state heritage (built)
- Designated: 21 October 1992
- Reference no.: 600370
- Significant period: 1890s (fabric)
- Significant components: abutments – railway bridge, pier/s (bridge)
- Builders: James Overend

Saltwater Creek Railway Bridge is a heritage-listed railway bridge over Bundaberg Creek (also known as Saltwater Creek) on Quay Street from Bundaberg Central to Bundaberg East in Bundaberg, Bundaberg Region, Queensland, Australia. It was built in 1894 by James Overend. It is also known as Millaquin Bridge. It was added to the Queensland Heritage Register on 21 October 1992.

== History ==
Agitation for a railway from Bundaberg to the Woongarra district began in the 1880s and a line was surveyed during 1889–91. In the absence of funds for government construction and with the support of the railway commissioners, Robert Cran of the Millaquin sugar refinery near Bundaberg, was authorised by an Act of Parliament in 1892, to construct a private railway from Bundaberg to the sugar refinery. Plans were prepared for the bridge in 1893. Tenders were called by the government and a contract for construction was awarded to James Overend in January 1894. The railway was opened for traffic on 9 July 1894.

The railway was acquired by the Queensland Government on 3 December 1912. In 1917, an Act of Parliament approved the acquisition of the railway to Woongarra. In 1918, the State Government acquired the extension of the railway which had been constructed by the Woongarra Shire Council.

In 1965, plans were prepared for strengthening the bridge with steel girders suitable for a 12-ton axle loading. This was subsequently undertaken with re-used girders from the Gold Coast.

== Description ==
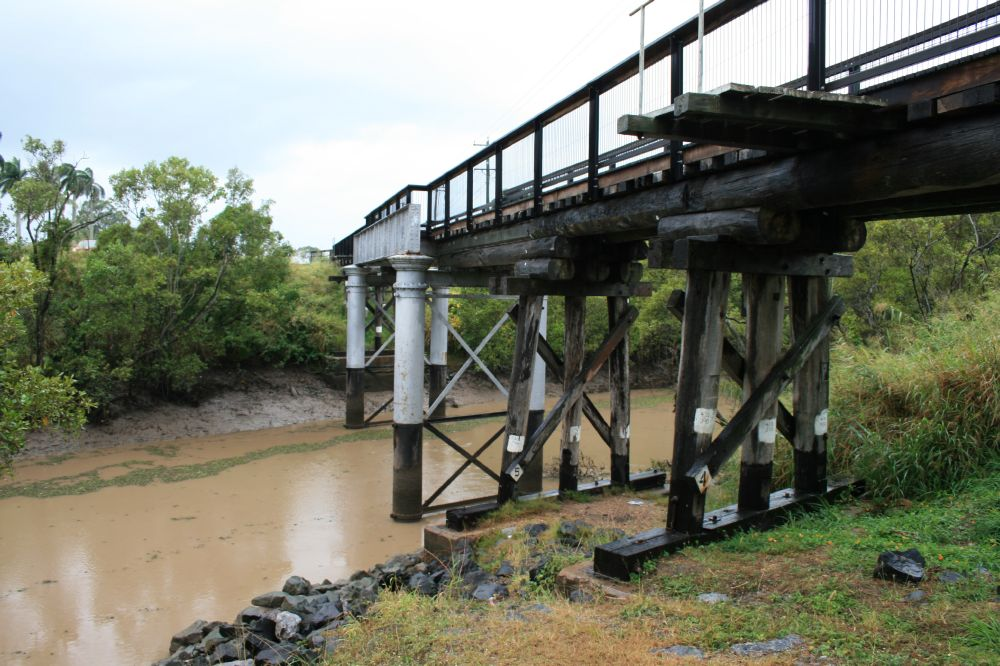
Bridge, 2009

Saltwater Creek bridge includes one 50-foot (15 m) plate girder span with steel cross girders and longitudinals, seven 20 and two 26-foot (7.9 m) timber spans, supported on seven timber piers, two concrete cylinder piers, and two timber abutments.

It comprises:

- 4x1x2 20-foot (6.1 m) timber longitudinals, concrete abutment, common braced timber trestles, (two on timber foundations) or a common concrete pier (piers 1 to 5)
- 1x2x2 26-foot (7.9 m) timber longitudinals, common braced timber trestle on a concrete foundation (pier 5), common cast iron cylinders with screw piles (pier 6)
- 1x2 50-foot (15 m) half-through plate girders with steel cross girders, steel longitudinals, common cast iron cylinder piers with screw piles (piers 6 and 7)
- 1x2x2 26-foot (7.9 m) timber longitudinals, common cast iron cylinders with screw piles (pier 7), common braced timber trestle (pier 8).
- 3x1x2 20-foot (6.1 m) timber longitudinals, common braced timber trestles (piers 8 to 11).

== Heritage listing ==
Saltwater Creek Railway Bridge was listed on the Queensland Heritage Register on 21 October 1992 having satisfied the following criteria.

The place is important in demonstrating the evolution or pattern of Queensland's history.

A late 19th century bridge which is the second oldest extant with screw piles in Queensland, on what was constructed as a private railway to government standards.

The place is important in demonstrating the principal characteristics of a particular class of cultural places..

A late 19th century bridge which is the second oldest extant with screw piles in Queensland, on what was constructed as a private railway to government standards.
