= Toroī =

Māori dish

- Type: Pickle
- Place of origin: New Zealand
- Main ingredients: Leaf vegetable (usually pūhā or watercress), mussels

Toroī is a traditional Māori dish made from mussels and a leaf vegetable, usually pūhā or watercress.

== Production ==
The ingredients are cooked together in mussel broth and stored in jars, preserved by undergoing fermentation by bacteria. Toroī can also seasoned with ingredients such as chili and garlic during the fermentation process.

== See also ==
- Kimchi
- Knieperkohl
- List of pickled foods
- Sauerkraut
