= Louise cake =

New Zealand cake

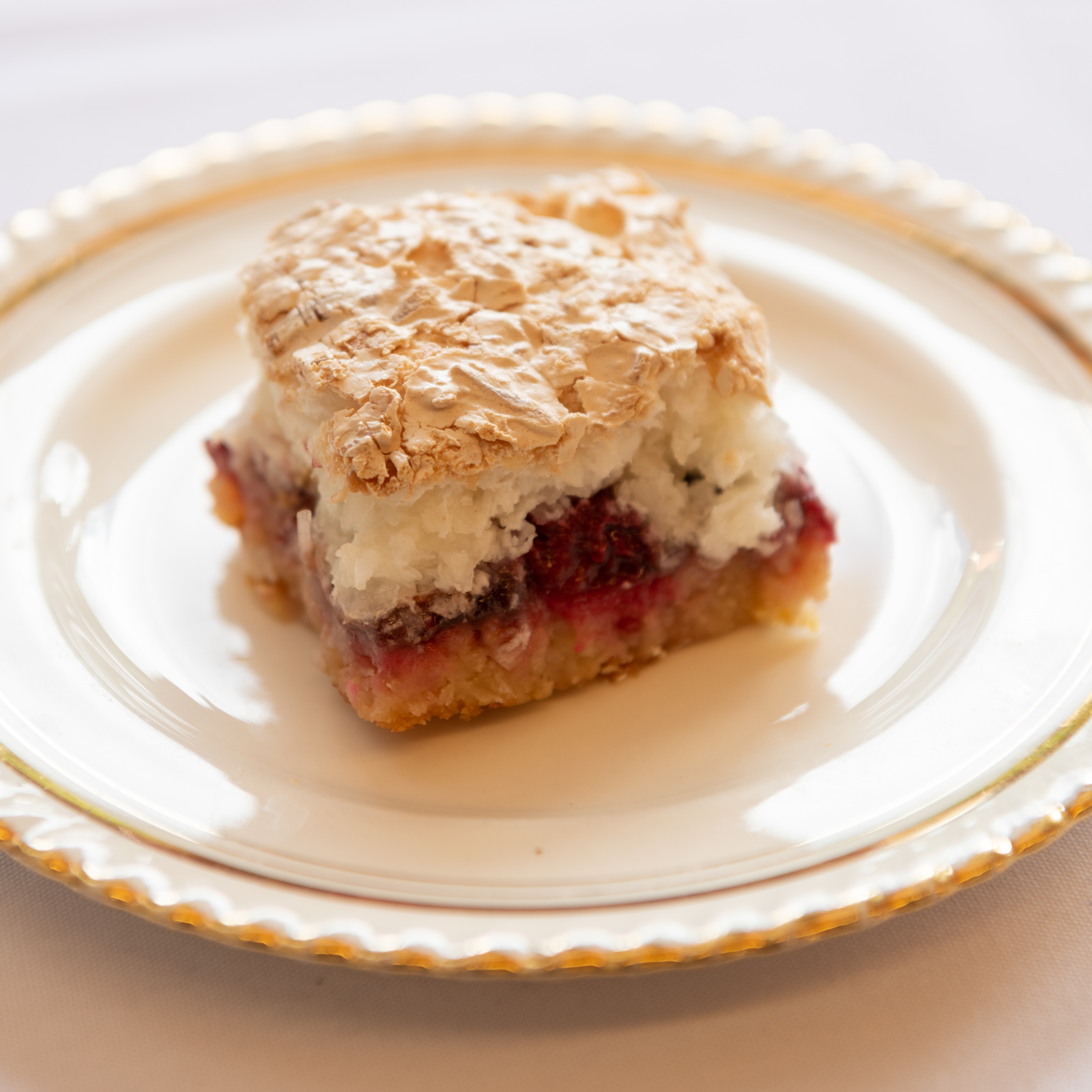
- Alternative names: Louise slice, keke ruihi
- Type: Cake or confection
- Place of origin: New Zealand
- Main ingredients: Butter, eggs, raspberry jam, coconut

Louise cake or Louise slice (keke ruihi in Māori) is a baked New Zealand sweet dish that consists of raspberry jam and coconut-flavoured meringue on a shortbread base. The confection's name may refer to the 1871 wedding of Princess Louise.

== History ==
It has been suggested that the cake was created to celebrate the wedding of Princess Louise (one of Queen Victoria's daughters) in 1871. A recipe for Louise cake was shared in the Otago Witness newspaper in October 1927.

The cake was featured in the 2022 bilingual cookbook Whānaukai by Auckland baker and former Whakaata Māori presenter, Naomi Toilalo.

== Recipe ==
The base of Louise cake is shortbread, made from eggs, sugar, butter and flour. The shortbread layer is topped with raspberry jam, followed by a layer of meringue with coconut mixed into it. Although not traditional, some bakers nowadays decorate the cake with raspberries, either fresh or crushed freeze-dried. Other modern variations on the recipe replace the layer of raspberry jam with plum or kiwifruit jam, stewed rhubarb or lemon curd.
