= Bundaberg Brewed Drinks =

Non-alcoholic beverages company

Coordinates: 24.8524°S 152.3813°E

- Type: Private
- Industry: Brewing
- Founded: 1960
- Founder: Cliff Fleming
- Headquarters: Bundaberg East, Queensland, Australia
- Key people: John McLean (Managing Director)
- Products: Beverages
- Owner: Fleming Family
- Website: bundaberg.com

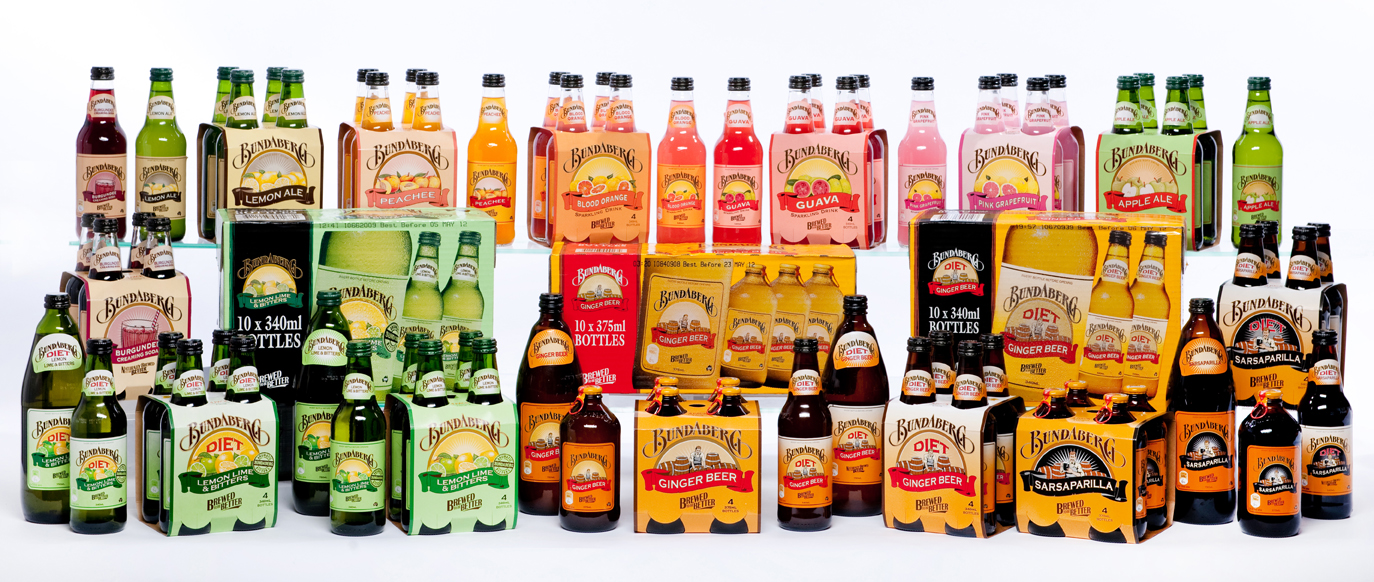
Bundaberg Brewed Drinks range

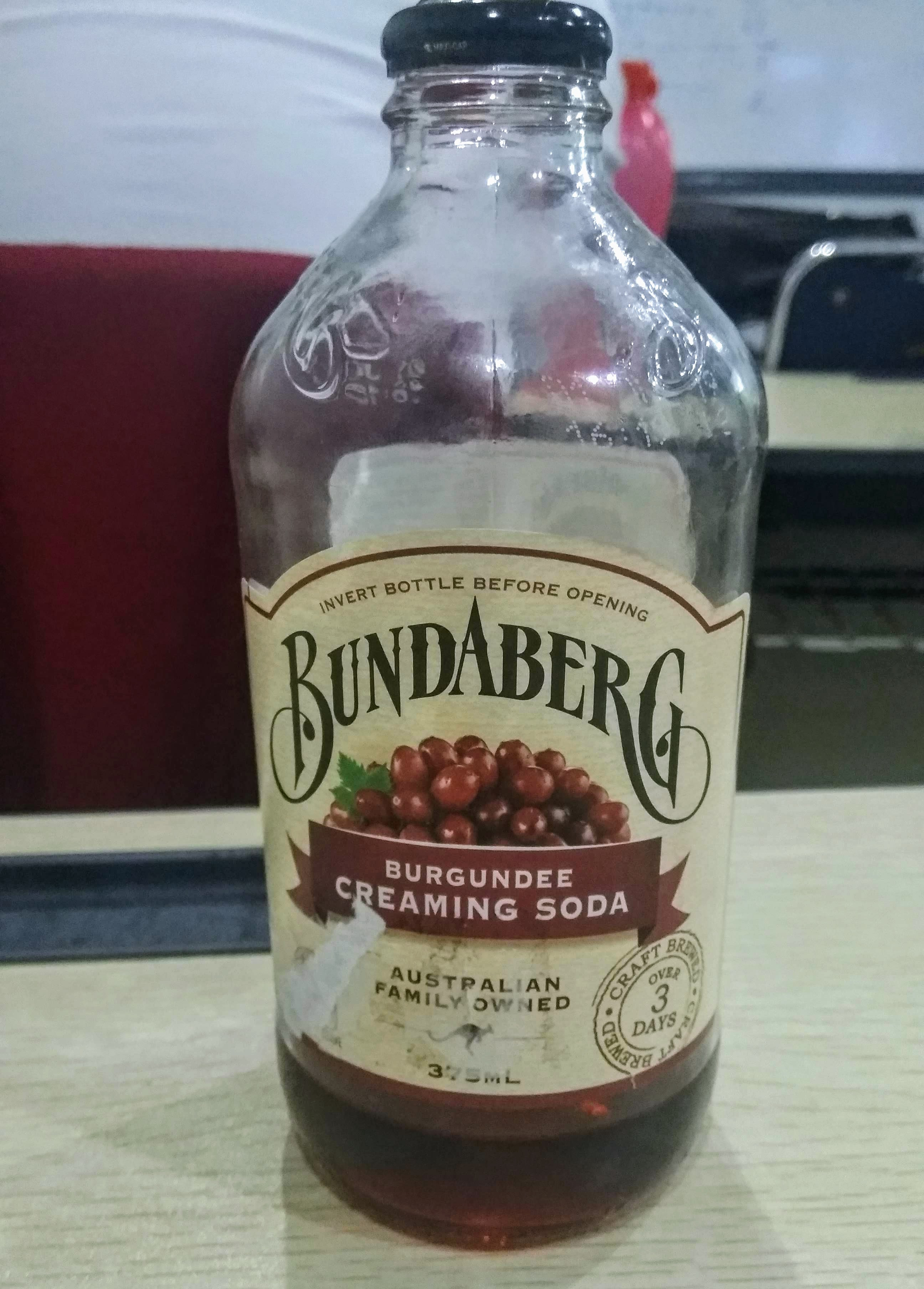
Bundaberg Burgundee Creaming Soda, one product of Bundaberg Brewed Drinks

Bundaberg Brewed Drinks Pty Ltd is an Australian family-owned business that brews non-alcoholic beverages. Based in Bundaberg, Queensland, the company exports to over 60 countries across the globe and is most known for ginger beer and other carbonated beverages.

== History ==
The company was established in Bundaberg in 1960 as a bottling and fermenting business. In 1968, Mr. and Mrs. Fleming (senior) along with Cliff and Lee Fleming, bought the business, then known as Electra Breweries. From then on, it was run by mother, father, son and daughter.

In 1995, the company changed its name to 'Bundaberg Brewed Drinks' developing a distinctive, local brand. At this same time, the now well known 'Brewed to Be Better' promise was introduced, highlighting the key point of difference for the brand - brewing.

Over the years, the company has seen growth in sales and brand recognition, both domestically and internationally. Today, Bundaberg Brewed Drinks can be found in more than 60 countries worldwide.

In 2007, John McLean took over as CEO of Bundaberg Brewed Drinks. Mr McLean is the son-in-law of original business founders, Cliff and Lee Fleming.

In March 2018, the company entered into a partnership with PepsiCo to distribute their beverages across the United States, although the two remain separate companies.

In 2022, Bundaberg Brewed Drinks was named the 2022 Queensland Exporter of the Year at the Premier of Queensland's Export Awards.

In 2023, Bundaberg Brewed Drinks launched its new state-of-the-art Master Brewery after two years of construction. The purpose-built facility remains in Bundaberg and allows for increase production and is equipped for future expansion. The same year, Bundaberg Brewed Drinks was inducted into the Queensland Business Leaders Hall of Fame.

In 2024, Bundaberg Brewed Drinks Founder, Cliff Fleming, was named a Member of the Order of Australia (AM) for significant service to business and to the community of Bundaberg.

== Product range ==
The flavours include:

- Ginger Beer
- Lemon, Lime and Bitters
- Sarsaparilla / Root Beer
- Burgundee Creaming Soda
- Peach
- Pink Grapefruit
- Guava
- Blood Orange
- Passionfruit
- Traditional Lemonade
- Pineapple and Coconut
- Tropical Mango

The Diet range includes:

- Diet Ginger Beer
- Diet Lemon Lime and Bitters
- Diet Sarsaparilla / Root Beer

Since 2014, the brand has been offering limited releases of its popular Spiced Ginger Beer during the festive season. Based on the original Ginger Beer but with a cinnamon and clove twist, the once-a-year product has been a hit with consumers worldwide.

In 2021, Bundaberg Brewed Drinks released a 200ml Mini Can range comprising its top flavours - Ginger Beer, Passionfruit, Lemon Lime & Bitters and Pink Grapefruit. The range was extended to add a new Blood Orange Mini Can in 2023.

Due to the popularity of the Bundaberg range, the brand has embarked on a variety of limited release product collaborations over the years. Some notable releases include the Whittaker's x Bundaberg Ginger Caramel Chocolate Block, an Alcoholic Ginger Beer with Bundaberg Rum, and the Bundaberg Ginger Beer Potato Chip alongside Kettle Chips.

In April 2025, Bundaberg Brewed Drinks launched their refreshingly light range with three flavours: Raspberry & Pomegranate, Apple & Lychee, and Lemon & Watermelon. These are packaged in 250ml cans and designed to have less sugar and calorie content.

== Tourism ==
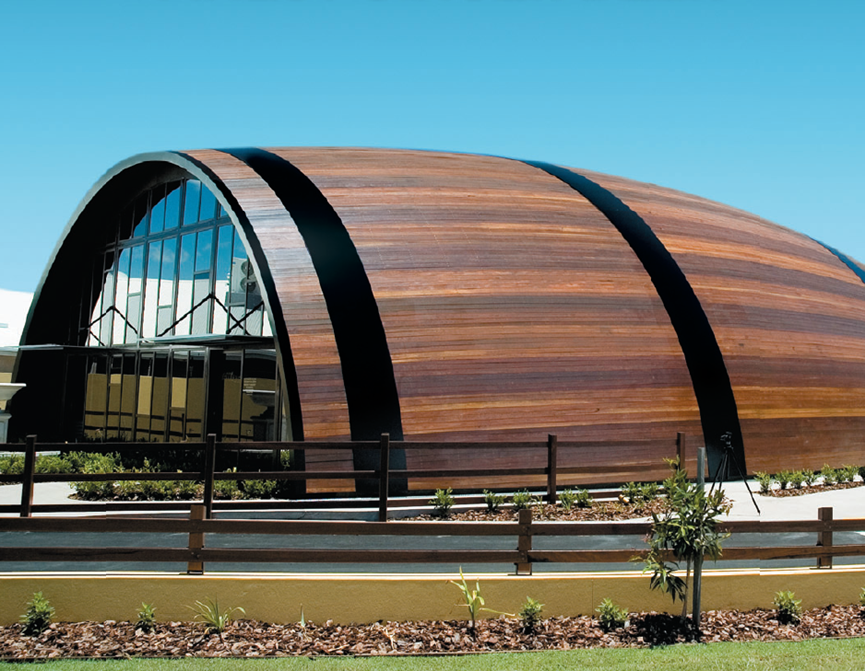
The Bundaberg Barrel on Bargara Road, Bundaberg East

In 2005, Bundaberg Brewed Drinks opened their tourist facility, the Bundaberg Barrel, one of the big things in Bundaberg East.

The Bundaberg Barrel provides visitors with the opportunity to sample every Bundaberg flavour through an interactive guided tasting session.

In 2023 and 2024, The Bundaberg Barrel was awarded a Tripadvisor Travellers' Choice Award. This award is provided to accommodations, attractions and restaurants that consistently earn great reviews from travellers and are ranked within the top 10% of properties on Tripadvisor.

== Awards ==
The Bundaberg Brewed Drinks range has received recognition across the globe, including awards such as the Gold in the Mixers category at the Berlin Spirits Competition, Double Gold at the SIP Awards and Gold at the New York International Spirit Awards.

In 2022, Bundaberg Brewed Drinks was rated Australia's #1 Soft Drink in the Canstar Blue Most Satisfied Customer Awards.

== See also ==
- List of brand name soft drinks products
- List of soft drink flavors
- List of soft drinks by country
