= Ginger crunch =

New Zealand biscuit confection

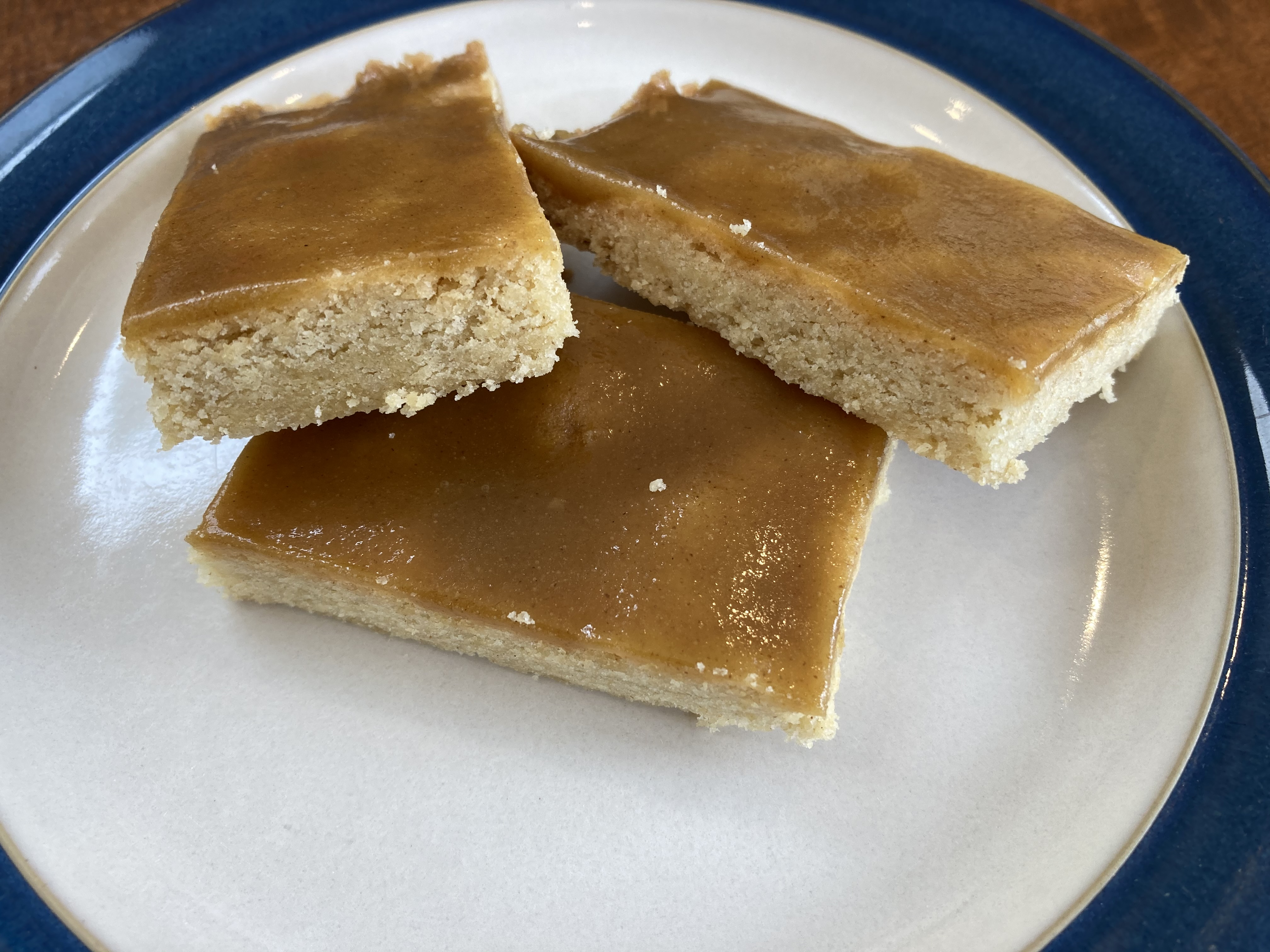
- Alternative names: Ginger slice, Ginger square
- Type: Biscuit
- Course: Dessert
- Associated cuisine: New Zealand
- Main ingredients: Shortbread, Ginger

Ginger crunch, also known as ginger slice or ginger square, is a New Zealand biscuit confection consisting of a rectangular shortbread base topped with ginger icing.

There are many variations of this recipe. The shortbread base can contain additions such as rolled oats or coconut, or is sometimes substituted with a biscuit base. Nuts or crystallised ginger are often added to the icing.

== See also ==
- Shortbread
- List of shortbread biscuits and cookies
