= Jelly slice =

Australian layered dessert

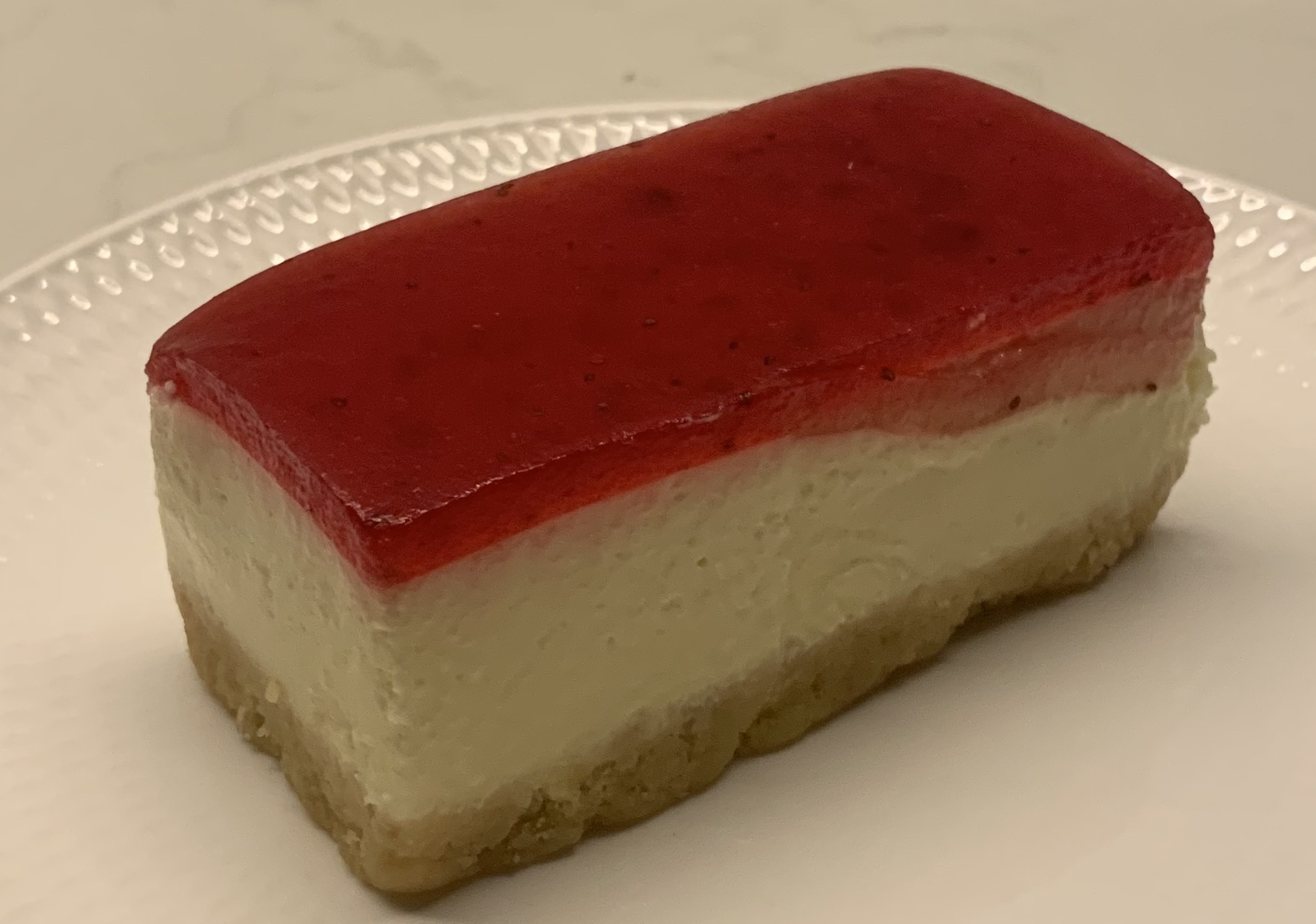
- Course: Dessert
- Place of origin: Australia, New Zealand
- Serving temperature: Chilled
- Main ingredients: Jelly; Custard or cream; biscuits

Jelly slice is an Australian and New Zealand jelly dessert which consists of three layers: a crust, a filling, and a topping. The crust is made out of crushed Arnott's biscuits, the filling is usually sweetened condensed milk, and the topping is made from Aeroplane Jelly.

Jelly slices originated in Australia, and are popular desserts especially around Christmas and Easter time, although they are also eaten throughout the year. Despite its popularity in Australia and New Zealand, the dessert is not as common around other parts of the world, but may be found in Commonwealth countries.
