= Parrot pie =

Type of pie

- Parrot pie, pictured in the 1888 edition of Mrs. Beeton's Book of Household Management
- Type: Pie
- Place of origin: Australia
- Main ingredients: Parrot meat
- Other information: Outlawed in 20th century

Parrot pie is a dish that was eaten in Australia into the early 20th century.

The pie was praised by several of Australia's early settlers. A variety of parrots were used, including king parrots, crimson rosellas, and rainbow lorikeets, which the pies could contain alone or in combination with other meats such as beef and ham. A recipe was included in editions of the English Mrs. Beeton's Book of Household Management.

General consumption of parrot pies ended in Australia after laws protecting parrots were implemented.

== History ==
Parrots have been baked into pies in Australia since the first voyage of James Cook. Sydney Parkinson, an artist hired to make botanical illustrations reported seeing upon landing in Botany Bay a "great number of birds of beautiful plumage; among which there were two sorts of parroquets, and a beautiful loriquet; we shot a few of them, which we made into a pie and they ate very well." By the 1820s, the sale of parrots was established in Sydney markets. Birds were trapped or taken from their nests, including king parrots, crimson rosellas, rainbow lorikeets, galahs and sulphur-crested cockatoos, depending on the season. Pies were a common preparation for the birds, for which a dozen could be bought for a shilling.

Margaret Pearson's recipe alongside other recipes using native Australian birds

Several settlers writing in the mid-19th century spoke highly of parrot pie, including Katherine Kirkland, who opined that the best were made with white parrots, and Sarah Brunskill, who likened the flavour to pigeon. A recipe from the end of the century indicated that only the breast and thigh were used for meat, which needed long simmering to become tender, with the carcass used for stock. (Note: In the telling of an old Australian joke, "to cook a galah: one must first pluck the bird and put it in boiling water with a stone, brick, axehead or boot. When the stone is soft, the cooking is done. Throwaway the galah and eat the stone.") Recipes could include parrot as the only form of meat (as was the preference of Wilhelmina Rawson, who added white sauce flavoured with nutmeg and parsley), or several, as in the 1889 recipe given by Margaret Pearson: (Note: According to the food historian Barbara Santich, the flavour of parrot may have been lost in Pearson's preparation, dominated by the flavours of other meats.)

Cut the birds into two, and rub well with butter, place the slices of beef in a pie dish and place on them birds and slices of ham, cut in neat pieces the boiled eggs and add, then pour in a cup of well-seasoned stock: cover over with rough puff paste, decorate with cut leaves, etc., from the paste, stick the legs and feet well cleaned and blanched into the centre.

In Britain, the 1888 edition of Mrs. Beeton's Book of Household Management included a recipe for parrot pie in a section on Australian cooking, containing a dozen parakeets. Its inclusion, and the inclusion of other Australian recipes like roast wallaby became a source of ridicule. In Australia, parrot pies remained popular into the early 20th century, when the dish was regarded as a quintessentially Australian dish. During the second half of the 19th century, legislation to protect native fauna had expanded, and in 1918 some parrots became a protected species in Australia for the first time. They continued to appear in cookbooks, although only rarely, and as a curiosity, and by 1962, Jock Marshall reported that "most people today have not heard of [galah pie], let alone tasted it." Parrots are no longer commonly eaten in Australia.

== Sources ==
- David, Elizabeth (1986). An Omelette and a Glass of Wine. London: Penguin Books. ISBN 0-14-046721-1.
- Marshall, Jock (2000). "Galah Pie and Emu". In Santich, Barbara (ed.). In the Land of the Magic Pudding: A gastronomic miscellany. Kent Town, South Australia: Wakefield Press. ISBN 1-86254-530-8.
- Olsen, Penny (June 2006). "A penchant for parrot pie". National Library of Australia News. 16 (9).
- Santich, Barbara (2000). "Parrot Pie and Curried Wattle Birds". In Santich, Barbara (ed.). In the Land of the Magic Pudding: A gastronomic miscellany. Kent Town, South Australia: Wakefield Press. ISBN 1-86254-530-8.
- Santich, Barbara (2012). Bold Palates: Australia's Gastronomic Heritage. Kent Town, South Australia: Wakefield Press. ISBN 978-1-74305-113-9.
- van Reyk, Paul; Boehrer, Bruce (Spring 2005). "Antipodean Psittacophagy: An Exchange". Gastronomica. 5 (2). doi:10.1525/gfc.2005.5.2.9.
