= Slippery Bob =

Fried brain dish

Slippery Bob is a historical dish made by frying kangaroo brains in emu fat. Edward Abbott provides a recipe in his 1864 cookbook The English and Australian Cookery Book, directing cooks "Take kangaroo brains, and mix with flour and water, and make into batter; well season with pepper, salt, etc; then pour a table-spoonful at a time into an iron pot containing emeu [sic] fat, and take them out when done." Slippery Bob, Abbott writes, was "'Bush fare', requiring a good appetite and excellent digestion." Abbott identified his source for the Slippery Bob recipe as an "old hand", noting that he could not find a young person who knew of the dish.

Slippery Bob is an example of a dish that was likely used to make use of less desirable parts of a kangaroo. Its nutritional value would have been low. It is among the best known of Abbott's recipes―writing at the end of the 20th century, the food historian Barbara Santich describes Slippery Bob as part of a national mythology alongside damper and pan jam, (Note: Kangaroo tail, roasted in ashes before being skinned, segmented, and gently fried with mushrooms, pepper, and bacon. Abbott produced a recipe for this too, deeming it "first rate tack".) assuming a place in Australia like the bunyip. It is typically cited as a novel dish without counterpart in British cuisine, although the food historian Jacqueline Newling characterises it as similar to many other fried-brain dishes. The dish was prepared on the Australian cooking show Gourmet Farmer Afloat, where it was suggested cooks without kangaroo brains could use sheep brains. After preparing, the host concludes: "I think that cooking it once is enough".

== See also ==
- Brain as food
- Kangaroo meat
  - Kangaroo steamer
  - Kangaroo tail soup

== Sources ==
- Bannerman, Colin (1998). Acquired Tastes: Celebrating Australia's Culinary History. Canberra, ACT: National Library of Australia. ISBN 0-642-10693-2.
- Connor, Michael (April 2025). "A Taste of History: Lessons from an Australian Aristologist". Quadrant.
- Newling, Jacqueline (2022). "'Uneasy Lies the Head That Wears the Crown': Lamb or Kangaroo, Which Should Reign Supreme? The Implications of Heroising a Settler Colonial Food Icon as National Identity". In Ranta, Ronald; Colás, Alejandro; Monterescu, Daniel (eds.). 'Going Native?': Settler Colonialism and Food. Cham, Switzerland: Palgrave Macmillan. doi:10.1007/978-3-030-96268-5_9. ISBN 978-3-030-96267-8.
- O'Brien, Charmaine (2016). The Colonial Kitchen: Australia 1788-1901. London: Rowman & Littlefield. ISBN 978-1-4422-4982-0.
- Santich, Barbara (2013) [1996]. Looking for Flavour (Expanded ed.). Kent Town, South Australia: Wakefield Press. ISBN 978 1 74305 207 5.
- Diana, Annamaria; Marcu-Istrate, Daniela; Toso, Alice (2026). Human Identities in the Archaeological Record: Interdisciplinary Perspectives from Late Antiquity to the Modern Period. Bloomsbury Publishing. doi:10.5040/9781350536265. ISBN 978 1 35053 625 8.
