= Musk stick =

Confection popular in Australia

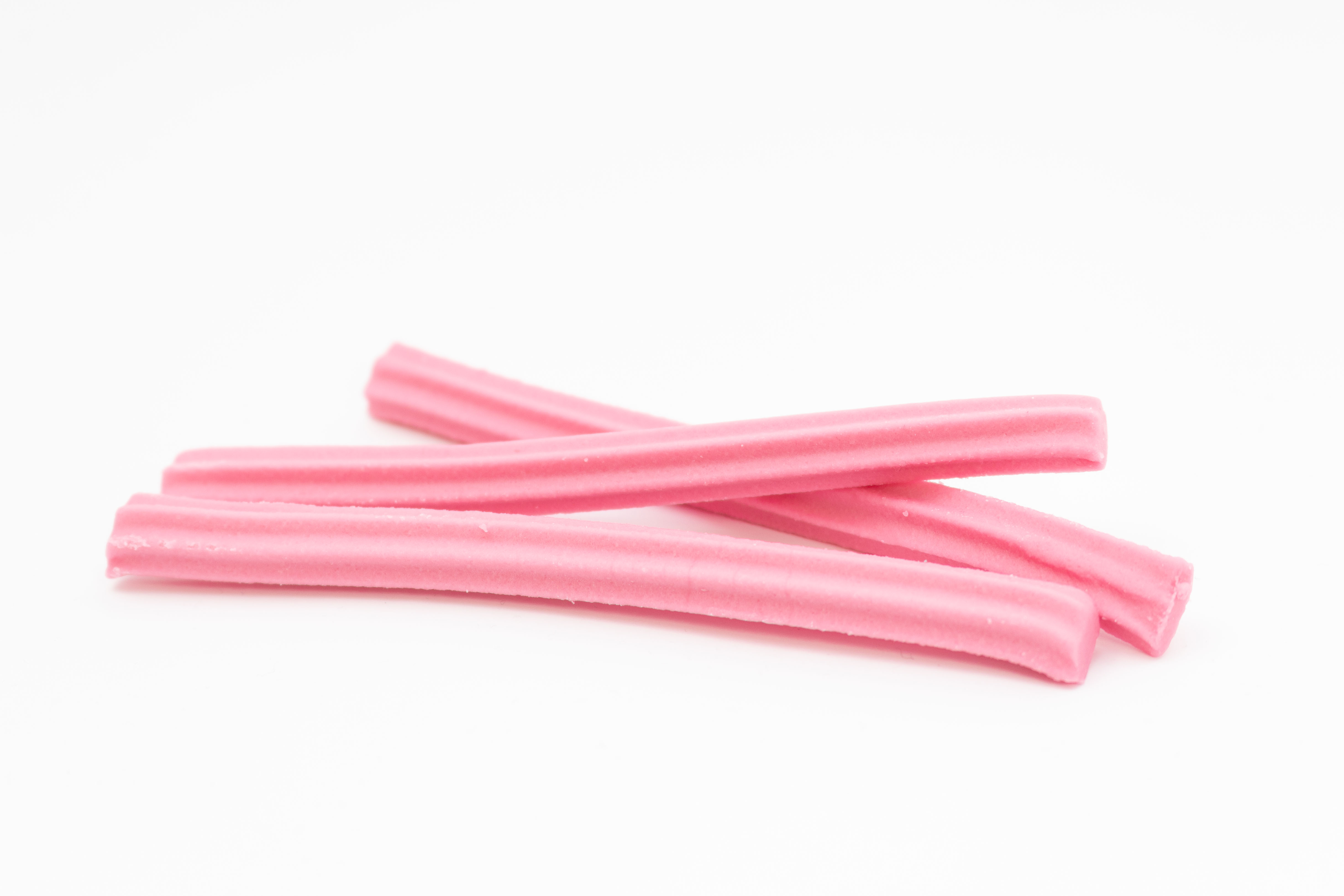
Musk sticks are often pink and extruded in the shape of a star

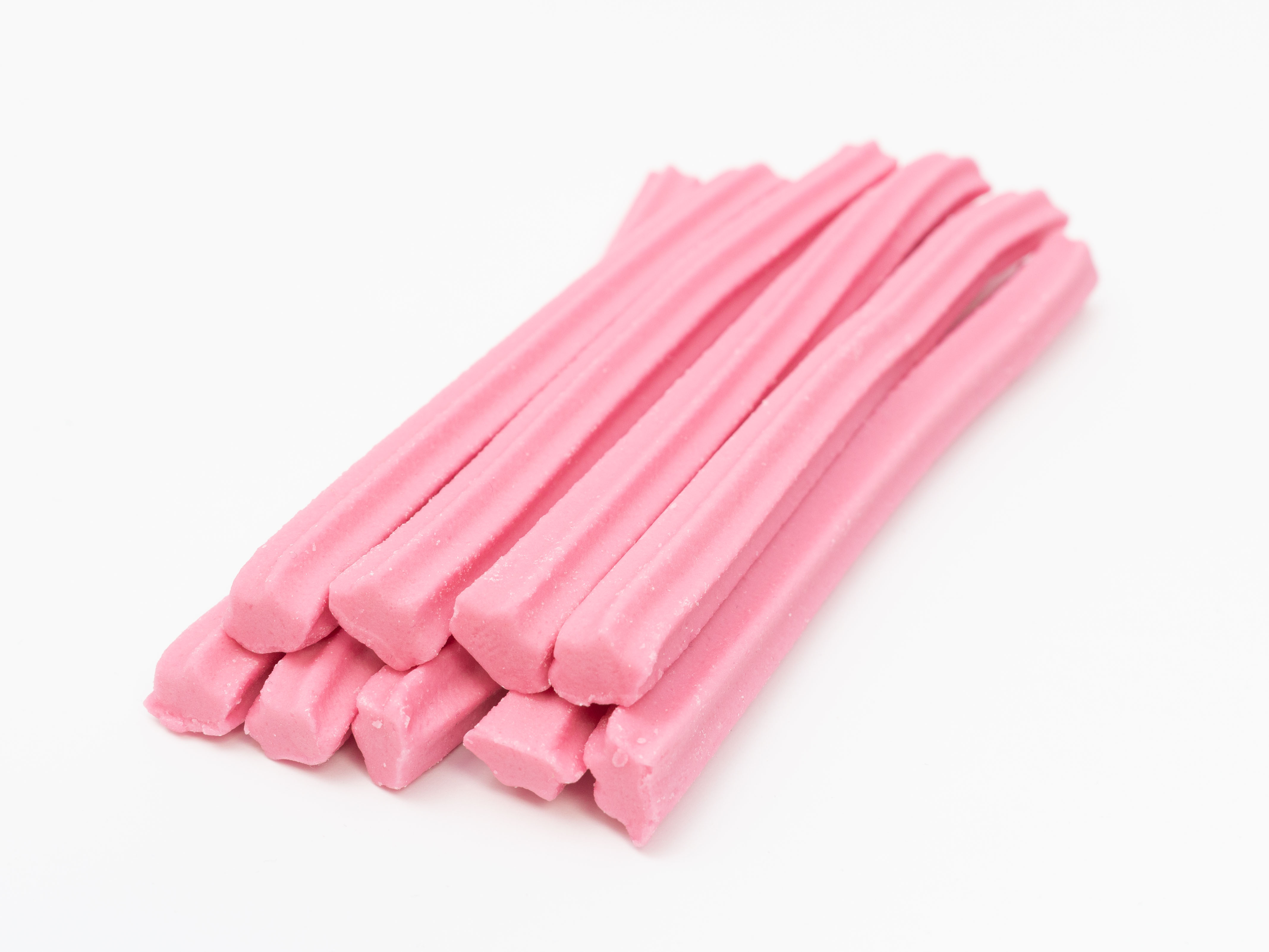
A pile of musk sticks

Musk sticks are a popular confection in Australia, available from many different suppliers. They consist of a semi-soft stick of fondant, usually pink, and often extruded with a ridged cross-section in the shape of a star. Their flavour and aroma is quite floral, and, as the name suggests, also reminiscent of the smell of musk. They are also called "musk sweets" and "musk lollies".

The origin of musk sticks is uncertain, but they date back at least as far as 1873, when The Guardian and North and North-Eastern Advertiser reported the theft of three jars of musk lollies from the shop of importer Mrs Bock in Kooringa. In 1887 the Launceston Examiner reported that the confectioner J. Beaumont imported "rose and musk lozenges". In the December 17, 1918 issue of The Sydney Morning Herald there was an auction notice which included "45 boxes of musk sticks". Another early reference from 1927 in the Australian Worker, talks about the "pink curly musk sticks" from 25 years earlier, which were still available. Total sales are not tracked centrally, but supermarket chain Woolworths is reported as selling about 24 million musk sticks per year.

Opinion about the confection is strongly polarised. ABC News said that "musk sticks manage to disgust tourists as much as they delight Australians", and in October 2018, the Disgusting Food Museum in Malmö, Sweden included musk sticks.

The popularity of Musk sticks has led to many other Musk flavoured confectioneries in Australia. Darrel Lea, under the Life Savers brand, produces a popular Musk flavour, and in 2023 introduced a limited edition Musk and raspberry jelly chocolate bar. Zooper Dooper released a line of musk flavoured ice blocks in 2025.
