= Wilhelmina Rawson =

Australian food writer

Wilhelmina (Mina) Frances Rawson
- Born: Wilhelmina Frances Cahill; 10 October 1851; Sydney, New South Wales
- Died: 19 July 1933 (aged 81); Sydney, New South Wales
- Other names: Mrs Lance Rawson, Mina Rawson, Mina Ravenhill
- Occupation: Author
- Known for: Writings on culinary and domestic practices
- Spouse(s): Lance Rawson (died 1899), Colonel Francis Richard Ravenhill (m.1903, died 1906)
- Children: two sons, two daughters

Wilhelmina Frances Rawson (1851–1933) was an Australian author and authority on culinary and domestic practices. She is recognised as the first female cookbook author in Australia, writing recipes and household hints for life in colonial Australia which first appeared in 1878.

== Early life and family ==
Wilhelmina Frances Cahill was born in Sydney on 10 October 1851. She was the only child of James Cahill, a solicitor, and his wife Elizabeth Harriett, née Richardson. Mina's father died when she was 12 and her mother married Dr James John Cadell. Mina went to live on his property near Tamworth where she learned bushcraft and was part of a large family of sixteen children.

Mina married Lancelot Bernard Rawson on 26 June 1872 and went to live on a cattle station, The Hollows, west of Mackay, Queensland. In 1877 Mina moved with her husband and three small children to Kircubbin a sugar plantation 15 km (9.3 mi) outside of Maryborough. The Kircubbin sugar plantation went into bankruptcy in 1880 and the family moved to Boonooroo near Wide Bay where they were the first European settlers in the area. Mina and Lancelot had four children. They later quit Boonooroo and moved to Rockhampton.

== Career ==
Mina began writing short stories which were published in the Wide Bay News. Some of her stories were included in collections edited by Harriet Anne Patchett Martin. She was also the social editor of the Rockhampton People's Newspaper from 1901 – 1902.

Mina was the first female swimming teacher in Central Queensland in the 1890s, teaching more than 700 girls in Rockhampton, Townsville and Brisbane to swim. She also lobbied to have children taught swimming in schools.

== Cookbooks and domestic advice ==
It was Mina's own experiences as a housewife in isolated and remote parts of Queensland that inspired her to write a book of recipes and household hints for the "young and inexperienced housewife living in the bush". At that time race relations between white settlers, the local Aboriginal peoples and the kanaka servants formed complex hierarchies in colonial Queensland society. This is evident in Mina's books. The recipes use many indigenous Australian plants and animals.

"Mrs Lance Rawson's Cookery Book … is written entirely for the Colonies, and for the middle classes, and for those people who cannot afford to buy a Mrs Beeton or a Warne, but who can afford the three shillings for this."

— Wilhelmina Rawson, Preface, Queensland Cookery and Poultry Book, 1878

== Memoirs ==
Mina's first husband, Lance Rawson died in 1899. Mina later married Colonel Francis Richard Ravenhill, in London, on 30 April 1903. He was her former husband's partner at Boonooroo. It was in these years that she wrote about her experiences of life as a colonial pioneer woman among the Aboriginals and the kanakas, who worked in the sugar plantations along the Mary River in Queensland. The memoirs of life on the cattle station and sugar plantation were serialised in a series of newspaper articles, "Making the Best of It" published from December 1919 – July 1920 in The Queenslander and "Stories of the Old Black Labour Days" published in The Courier-Mail.

Her second husband died in 1906. She died in Sydney on 19 July 1933 and was survived by her two sons and two daughters.

== Works ==
- Rawson, Lance Mrs (1876), Mrs. Lance Rawson's cookery book and household hints
- Rawson, Lance Mrs; Bailey, F. Manson (Frederick Manson). Contributions to Queensland flora; Queensland. Department of Agriculture (1880), Bulletin, The Dept
- Rawson, Lance Mrs (1886), Mrs. Lance Rawson's cookery book and household hints (2nd ed., enl. and rev ed.), William Hopkins
- Rawson, Mrs Lance (1891), Money and recipes, or, Reliable remarks re the Hollow lands : first subdivision, Mackay Hodges & Chataway
- Rawson, Lance Mrs (1893), Mrs. Rawson's Australian poultry book : specially written for Australia, Turner and Henderson
- Rawson, Lance Mrs (1894), Australian enquiry book of household and general information : a practical guide for the cottage, villa and bush home : recipes and information upon everything and for everybody, Pater & Knapton
- Rawson, Lance Mrs (1895), The Antipodean cookery book and kitchen companion, George Robertson & Co
- Rawson, Lance Mrs; Rawson, Lance Mrs. Australian enquiry book (1897), Australian cook and laundry book, J. W. Knapton
- Rawson, Lance Mrs (1919), Australian enquire within of household and general information, E. W. Cole, Book Arcade

== See also ==
- Margaret Pearson
