= Jugging =

Cooking process

Jugging is the process of stewing whole animals, mainly game or fish, for an extended period in a tightly covered container such as a casserole or an earthenware jug. In France a similar stew of a game animal (historically thickened with the animal's blood) is known as a civet.

== Jugged hare ==
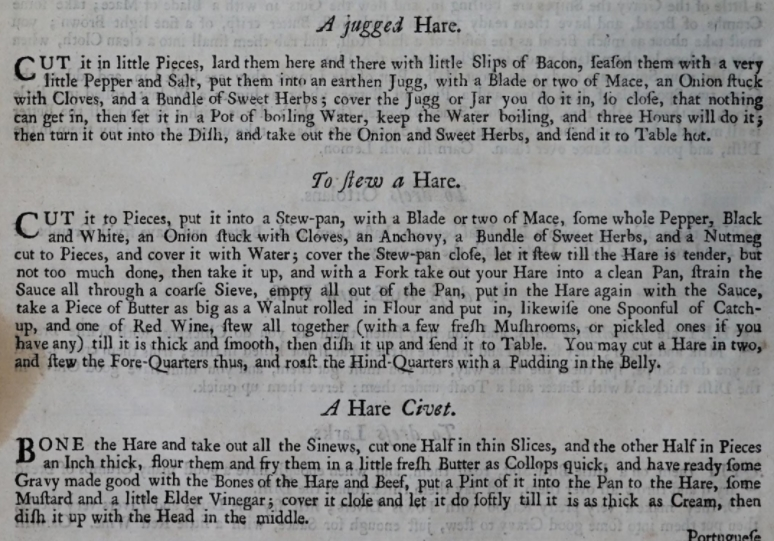
Three ways with hare: recipes in Hannah Glasse's The Art of Cookery Made Plain and Easy (1747), p.50

Jugged hare (a similar stew is known as civet de lièvre in France), a common dish involving jugging, is a whole hare, cut into pieces, marinated and cooked with red wine and juniper berries in a tall jug that stands in a pan of water. It is traditionally served with the hare's blood, or the blood is added at the end of the cooking process, and port wine.

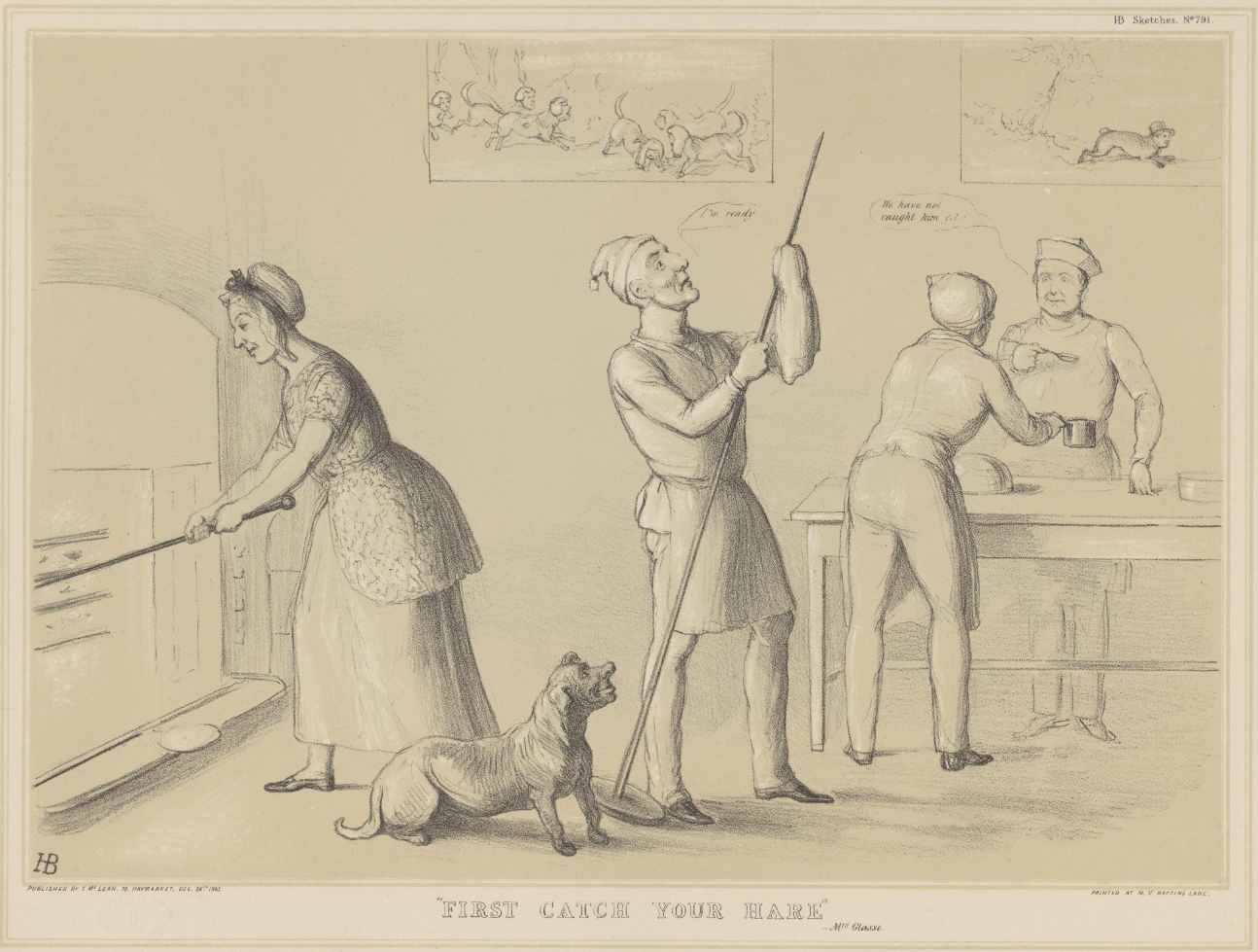
In 1843 John Doyle attributed "First catch your hare" to Mrs Glasse

Jugged hare is described in the influential 18th-century cookbook The Art of Cookery, by Hannah Glasse. Beginning in the nineteenth century, Glasse has been widely credited with having started the recipe with the words "First, catch your hare". This attribution is apocryphal. Her actual directions are, "Take your Hare when it is cas'd, and make a pudding ..." To 'case' means to take off the skin [not "to catch"]. Both the Oxford English Dictionary and The Dictionary of National Biography discuss the attribution.

However, having a freshly caught, or shot, hare enables one to obtain its blood. A freshly killed hare is prepared for jugging by removing its entrails and then hanging it in a larder by its hind legs, which causes the blood to accumulate in the chest cavity. One method of preserving the blood after draining it from the hare (since the hare itself is usually hung for a week or more) is to mix it with red wine vinegar in order to prevent it coagulating, and then to store it in a freezer.

Many other British cookbooks from before the middle of the 20th century have recipes for jugged hare. Merle and Reitch have this to say about jugged hare, for example:

The best part of the hare, when roasted, is the loin and the thick part of the hind leg; the other parts are only fit for stewing, hashing, or jugging. It is usual to roast a hare first, and to stew or jug the portion which is not eaten the first day. ...

To Jug A Hare. This mode of cooking a hare is very desirable when there is any doubt as to its age, as an old hare, which would be otherwise uneatable, may be made into an agreeable dish.

In 2006, a survey of 2,021 people for the television channel UKTV Food found that only 1.6% of the people aged under 25 recognized jugged hare by name. 7 out of 10 of those people stated that they would refuse to eat jugged hare if it were served at the house of a friend or relative.

== Civet de lapin ==
Civet de lapin (rabbit stew) is an alternative to civet de lièvre. It is considered a speciality of the cuisine of Martinique.

== Jugged kippers ==
Another jugged dish, also traditional in the United Kingdom, is jugged kippers, which is kipper (with the heads and tails removed) in a covered jug, cooked in boiling water. Recipe books recommend jugging kippers as one way of avoiding the strong smell that kippers have.

== See also ==
- List of cooking techniques
- List of meat dishes
- Kangaroo steamer
