= Margaret Pearson (cooking instructor) =

Australian food writer

1894 edition of Australian Cookery: Recipes for the People

Margaret Jane Pearson was a Scottish-Australian cooking instructor and cookbook author, active through the late-19th and early-20th century.

Pearson was born in the 1840s or early 1850s in Scotland. After an education at a boarding school, she began work as a governess, following it with study at the National Training School of Cookery in London. After graduating, she took on a role in Scotland as the superintendent of the Dundee School of Cookery. By 1886, she had travelled to Sydney, Australia, to give lessons in two forms of cookery she distinguished: "high class" and "plain cookery". In 1888, she moved to Melbourne, after being recruited to teach classes at the Working Men's College. She taught classes both in the day and the evening, with the nightly classes primarily attended by young women who were working during the day.

At the Melbourne Centennial Exhibition, she gave a number of lectures and demonstrations on behalf of the Metropolitan Gas Co., cooking recipes to show how the new technology of gas stoves worked. Contemporary comment in the Argus described "maids and matrons of every degree in the social scale from the general servant, who wishes to qualify for the more important office of cook, to the lady of fashion, who, for the moment, has "taken up cookery" as her latest and most engrossing fad".

In 1888, Pearson published Cookery Recipes for the People, which she described as teaching "plain wholesome cookery". Three editions were published, and the book sold 13,000 or 16,000 copies; very strong sales for the time. The book compiled many of the recipes she had been demonstrating at schools and exhibitions for gas companies, and several advertisements for gas stoves were contained. In 1890 she published another book, Australian Household Book: on Fruits, Canning, Preserving, Drinks and Light Summer Dishes.

Pearson later moved to Brisbane, where she died in her nineties.

== See also ==
- Wilhelmina Rawson

== Sources ==
- Kay, Emma (2017). Cooking Up History: Chefs of the Past. London: Prospect Books. ISBN 978-1-909248-53-3.
- O'Brien, Charmaine (2016). The Colonial Kitchen: Australia 1788-1901. London: Rowman & Littlefield. ISBN 978-1-4422-4982-0.
- Singley, Blake (2013). "'Everything Pertaining to the House': Cookbooks, Domestic Science and Ideology in Australia". In Eriksson, Sofia; Hastie, Madeleine; Roberts, Tom (eds.). Eat History: Food and Drink in Australia and Beyond. Newcastle upon Tyne, Tyne and Wear: Cambridge Scholars Publishing. ISBN 978-1-4438-4917-3.
- Symons, Michael (1982). One Continuous Picnic. Adelaide, South Australia: Duck Press. ISBN 0-9593047-0-3.
