= Cheese and bacon roll =

Bread snack

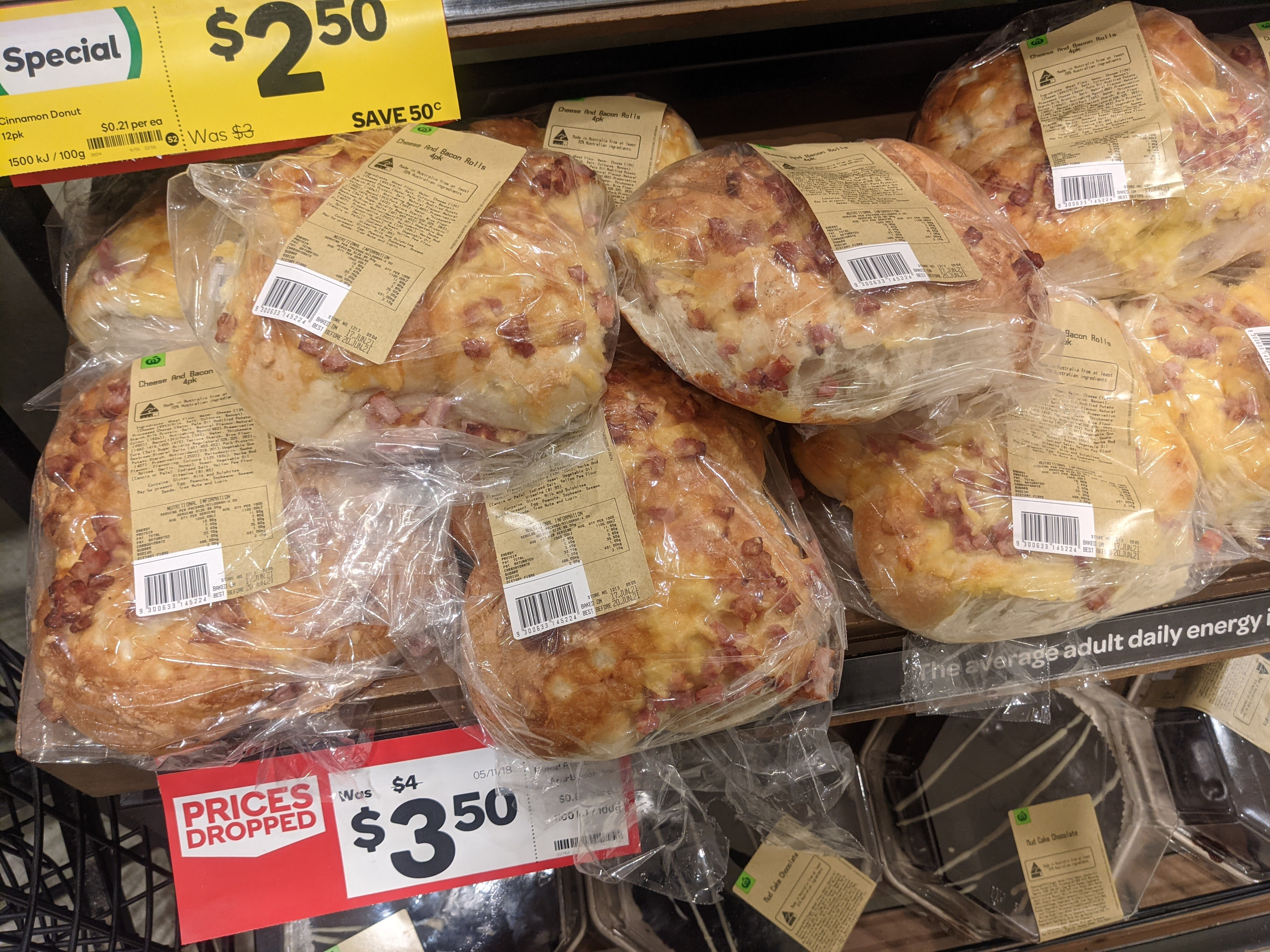
Cheese and bacon rolls available at a supermarket

Cheese and bacon rolls are popular bread snacks originating in Australia. Although similar to other bread dishes they are fairly simple to make and usually a dough topped with cheese and bacon then baked. Some regional varieties include tomato or barbeque sauce as a topping or stuffed cheese, and they can be eaten with soup.

They are also a popular snack among school children.
