= Reactions to the murder of George Floyd =

A variety of people and organizations reacted to the murder of George Floyd on May 25, 2020, during an arrest by Minneapolis police. This includes his family and friends, politicians and other political organizations, the police, and other institutions and businesses, including internationally. This is aside from the George Floyd protests.

== Family and friends ==
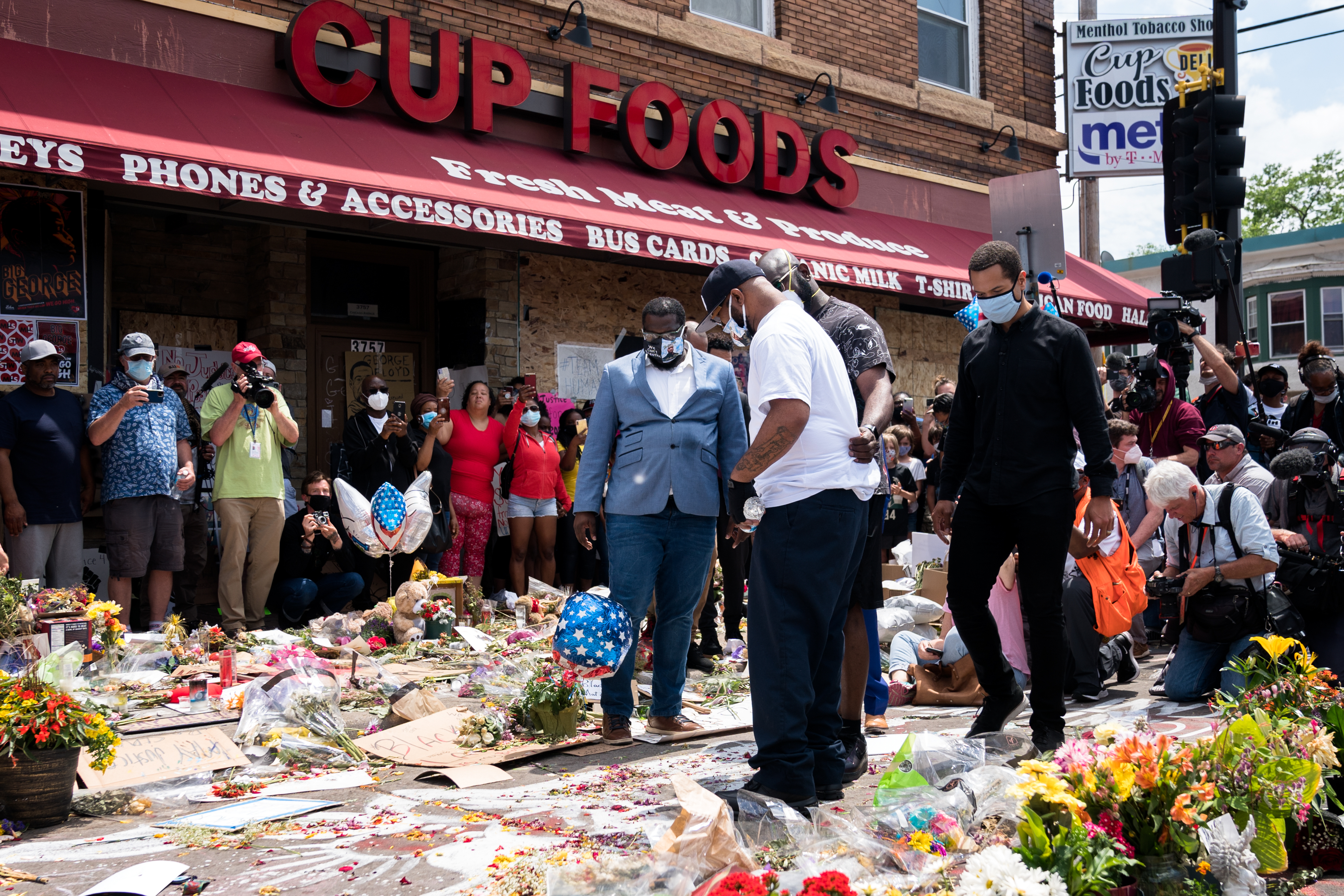
Terrence Floyd, George's brother, on June 1, 2020, visiting the location where George was murdered.

Floyd's cousin, Tera Brown, said police "were supposed to be there to serve and to protect and I didn't see a single one of them lift a finger to do anything to help while he was begging for his life". One of Floyd's brothers said: "They could have tased him; they could have maced him. Instead, they put their knee in his neck and just sat on him and then carried on. They treated him worse than they treat animals." Floyd's brother, Philonese, called for peace and said, "Everybody has a lot of pain right now, that's why this is happening, I'm tired of seeing black people dying."

Floyd's longtime friend, former professional basketball player Stephen Jackson, expressed anger and sadness, saying video of Floyd's murder "just destroyed me". Floyd's girlfriend, Courtney Ross, asked for the community to respond to his murder in a way that honors him: "You can't fight fire with fire. Everything just burns, and I've seen it all day – people hate, they're hating, they're hating, they're mad. And he would not want that." Selwyn Jones, the brother of Floyd's mother, said that what disturbed him most was "hearing him on video call for my sister".

== Political ==
=== Minneapolis and Minnesota ===
Minneapolis city councillor Andrea Jenkins, who represented Ward 8, where Floyd was murdered, was quoted as saying: "My heart is breaking for the tragic loss of life last night near 38th and Chicago. Our community continues to be traumatized again, and again and again. We must demand answers." On May 26, Minnesota governor Tim Walz and lieutenant governor Peggy Flanagan demanded justice and called the video "disturbing". Walz elaborated, "The lack of humanity in this disturbing video is sickening. We will get answers and seek justice".

Minneapolis mayor Jacob Frey said: "Being black in America should not be a death sentence. For five minutes, we watched a white officer press his knee into a black man's neck ... When you hear someone calling for help, you're supposed to help. This officer failed in the most basic, human sense." Two days after Floyd's murder, he commented: "If most people, particularly people of color, had done what a police officer did late Monday, they'd already be behind bars." He has said that he believes Floyd's death was a murder.

U.S. Representative Ilhan Omar (whose district includes Minneapolis) called for a federal investigation and said: "It is sickening to watch this black man be killed while helplessly begging for help." She later added: "The police officer who killed George Floyd should be charged with murder." Senator Tina Smith and Governor Tim Walz also called for immediate action. Senator Amy Klobuchar reacted on the following day, saying: "We heard his repeated calls for help. We heard him say over and over again that he could not breathe. And now we have seen yet another horrifying and gut wrenching instance of an African American man dying." She called for "a complete and thorough outside investigation into what occurred, and those involved in this incident must be held accountable." However, as a former Hennepin County attorney, she was criticized for declining to press criminal charges against police during her eight years in that office, including against Chauvin; some called for her resignation from the Senate.

At a June 7 rally, nine of the Minneapolis City Council's thirteen members pledged to disband the city's police department, though significant reductions in police staffing may require amending the city's charter and Frey has expressed opposition to it. On June 12 the council unanimously adopted a resolution to begin a year-long project to develop "strategies for building [a] new model for cultivating community safety". After the City Council banned police chokeholds, Walz called for similar reforms in other communities, called the Minnesota legislature into a special session on police reform and economic equality and proposed a police reform package.

On June 26, 2020, the Minneapolis City Council approved a proposed charter amendment to alter the Minneapolis Police Department. The proposed amendment was drafted by council members Jeremiah Ellison, Alondra Cano, Cam Gordon, Steve Fletcher and council President Lisa Bender. Despite previous pledges by city council members to "end" the Minneapolis Police Department, Star Tribune reporter Liz Navratil afterwards revealed that the proposed amendment, which allows the continuation of "licensed officers," would not fulfill this objective if approved by voters, but would only rename the Minneapolis Police Department and change its structure. On August 5, 2020, Minneapolis City Charter Commission subjugated the city council's proposal to a lengthy, undisclosed period of review. The city council's proposal also did not appear on the general election ballot in 2020.

=== Federal ===
President Donald Trump sent his condolences on May 27 via Twitter, saying he requested that the FBI conduct a thorough investigation. He added, "My heart goes out to George's family and friends. Justice will be served!" Trump also described Floyd's murder as "sad and tragic".

On May 29, President Trump denounced rioting, violence and looting occurring during nationwide protests, tweeting: "These THUGS are dishonoring the memory of George Floyd, and I won't let that happen. Just spoke to Governor Tim Walz and told him that the Military is with him all the way. Any difficulty and we will assume control but, when the looting starts, the shooting starts. Thank you!" On June 1, in response to continued protests, President Trump threatened to deploy the military by invoking the Insurrection Act of 1807.

U.S. Ambassadors in the Democratic Republic of the Congo, Kenya, Tanzania, and China expressed concern and condemned the murder.

On June 13, the U.S. Embassy in Seoul, South Korea, put up a large Black Lives Matter banner to show "our support for the fight against racial injustice and police brutality as we strive to be a more inclusive & just society.”

Proposals were made in the House by the Congressional Black Caucus and in the Senate by Tim Scott of South Carolina, the Senate's only black Republican, to address police reforms. The Senate bill failed to advance to the House. The House bill was passed June 25 with support from three House Republicans.

Washington, D.C. Mayor Muriel Bowser had the words BLACK LIVES MATTER painted on a street immediately in front of the White House.

=== Former U.S. presidents ===
All living former United States presidents released statements.

- On May 29, Barack Obama published a lengthy statement through Twitter calling for a "new normal" that ends the legacy of "bigotry and unequal treatment". On June 3 he said that the United States "was founded on protest: it is called the American Revolution, and every step of progress in this country, every expansion of freedom, every expression of our deepest ideals has been won through efforts that made the status quo uncomfortable."
- On May 30, Bill Clinton released a statement via the Clinton Foundation saying: "In the days since George Floyd's death, it is impossible not to feel grief for his family — and anger, revulsion, and frustration that his death is the latest in a long line of tragedy and injustice, and a painful reminder that a person's race still determines how they will be treated in nearly every aspect of American life."
- On June 2, George W. Bush and former First Lady, Laura Bush, issued a 500-word statement which read in part that they are "anguished by the brutal suffocation of George Floyd and disturbed by the injustice and fear that suffocate our country", and that "It is time for America to examine our tragic failures." The statement continued, saying: "Many doubt the justice of our country, and with good reason. Black people see the repeated violation of their rights without an urgent and adequate response from American institutions. We know that lasting justice will only come by peaceful means."
- On June 3, Jimmy Carter and former First Lady Rosalynn Carter also released a statement, which read in part: "People of power, privilege, and moral conscience must stand up and say 'no more' to a racially discriminatory police and justice system, immoral economic disparities between whites and blacks, and government actions that undermine our unified democracy."

== Police ==
=== State ===
The union representing Minneapolis police pledged "full support to the involved officers ... Now is not the time to rush to judgement and immediately condemn our officers." After union president Bob Kroll called Floyd a "violent criminal" and protesters "terrorists", the Minnesota AFL–CIO and the Minneapolis branch of the American Federation of State, County and Municipal Employees called for him to resign.

The Minnesota Chiefs of Police Association endorsed the firing of the officers involved.

=== National ===
Police across the country were sharply critical of Chauvin's actions. Leaders from organizations which include hundreds of thousands of police officers condemned the four officers' conduct. National Association of Police Organizations Executive Director William Johnson called the incident egregious, and said: "I don't know the entire story, but I can't see any legal justification, any self-defense justification, or any moral justification." Fraternal Order of Police President Patrick Yoes said authorities must ensure justice is served in Floyd's murder, "whatever the consequences".

Police chief associations from across the country expressed dismay at Floyd's treatment. The heads of both the International Association of Chiefs of Police (IACP) and the Major Cities Chiefs Association (MCCA) condemned what was seen on the video. The MCCA, led by Houston Police Chief Art Acevedo, said: "The death of Mr. Floyd is deeply disturbing and should be of concern to all Americans. The officer's actions are inconsistent with the training and protocols of our profession and MCCA commends Minneapolis Police Chief Medaria Arradondo for his swift and decisive action to terminate the employment of the officers involved." The National Police Foundation President said: "These actions, and inaction, jeopardize the gains that have been made through the sacrifices and courage of many." Leaders of individual police departments from around the United States spoke out against the officer at the center of the video, with what The Washington Post called "disgust", and the Los Angeles Times called "blunt criticism". The Los Angeles Times said: "It was a rare moment when police leaders were unequivocal in their public disdain for the conduct of one of their own." Leaders condemning the officer's actions included the New York City Police Commissioner, the Sheriffs of Los Angeles and San Diego counties, and the Police Chiefs of Los Angeles, Boston, Miami, Houston, and Austin, as well as a former Police Chief from Seattle. Police chiefs of smaller cities spoke out as well: Chiefs of Police from Buffalo Grove, Illinois; Tucson, Arizona; Round Rock, Texas; the University of Texas at Austin; Pflugerville, Texas; and Omaha, Nebraska; all issued statements against Floyd's treatment.

Numerous experts on law enforcement technique and training severely criticized the use of the choke hold maneuver known as a "neck restraint" in general, and in Floyd's case in particular. The neck restraint was used in Minneapolis 237 times in the previous five years but was banned in the wake of Floyd's murder.

A deputy sheriff in Jones County, Mississippi was fired for posting on social media: "If he can scream he can breathe, something else was going on."

The New York State Legislature voted to make police disciplinary records public.

== Institutions ==
Soon after Floyd's murder, a number of institutions and organizations announced that they would be limiting or cutting ties with the Minneapolis Police Department, and no longer hiring its officers for event security. These included the University of Minnesota, the Minneapolis School Board, the Walker Art Center and the Minneapolis Institute of Art.

The United States Marine Corps, United States Navy and the US Army general in charge of U.S. Forces Korea have banned public display of the Confederate flag in their facilities.

National Football League commissioner Roger Goodell issued an apology "for not listening to NFL players earlier and encourage all to speak out and peacefully protest." The United States Soccer Federation repealed a 2017 rule requiring players to stand during the national anthem.

The Boy Scouts of America condemned the murders of Floyd and Ahmaud Arbery, and the shooting of Breonna Taylor; made a new Diversity/Inclusion merit badge a requirement for the rank of Eagle Scout; and promised a "review of property names, events and insignia ... to build on and enhance the organization's nearly 30-year ban on use of the Confederate flag".

In December 2020, PEN America gave the PEN/Benenson Courage Award to Darnella Frazier, the 17-year-old who filmed Floyd's restraint on her cell phone. In June 2021, Frazier also received a special citation from the Pulitzer Prize committee in 2021 for her video; the staff of the Star Tribune received the prize for Breaking News Reporting for their coverage of protests.

The Wikimedia Foundation made a blog post announcing their support for racial justice and condemned the murder of Floyd and the killings of Taylor, Arbery and David McAtee.

== Businesses and business organizations ==
Aunt Jemima, Uncle Ben's, Cream of Wheat, Mrs. Butterworth, Eskimo Pie, Redskins, Cleveland Indians, and Chicos announced that they will retire their brand images or names based on racial stereotypes.

Target and Best Buy made Juneteenth a company holiday.

In December 2021, "Floydies", a non-fungible token (NFT) collection was created by an individual known only as "Floydie" on Telegram. The NFTs consist of cartoon drawings of George Floyd with varied appearances, such as that of a slave, a monkey or dressed as Kyle Rittenhouse. The NFT collection was widely condemned, with the creator themself denying accusations of racism, referring to themself instead as an "opportunist". Floydies have since been banned from OpenSea, having made the creator almost $5,000.

=== Wikipedia ===
In a June 2020 article, Stephen Harrison from Slate noted that the English Wikipedia had become "a Battleground for Racial Justice" and that the encyclopedia’s volunteer editors were "rethinking what Wikipedia's commitment to neutrality actually means." A proposal to "black out" the English Wikipedia in response to Floyd's murder was rejected due to fears that it would compromise Wikipedia's neutrality.

== International ==
=== Governments ===
- Canada – Prime Minister Justin Trudeau said that racism was real and existed in both the United States and Canada. He then urged Canadians to stand up against it.
- China – The Ministry of Foreign Affairs denounced the murder of George Floyd with the statement: "The death of George Floyd reflects the severity of racial discrimination and police brutality in the US", and urged the US to "eliminate racial discrimination and protect the lawful rights of minorities". State media ran significant coverage of the events, with the goal of highlighting what Foreign Ministry spokesman Zhao Lijian called a "double standard" compared to US denunciations of police brutality in the 2019–20 Hong Kong protests.
- Costa Rica – The Legislative Assembly of Costa Rica observed a minute of silence in Floyd's memory.
- Germany – Chancellor Angela Merkel described the police operation as murder, saying: "this murder of George Floyd is something very, very terrible".
- Finland – Prime Minister Sanna Marin denounced racism and discrimination. Finns Party MP Ano Turtiainen posted a mocking tweet about Floyd, which led to a police investigation and Turtiainen being expelled from his party.
- Iran – Supreme Leader Ali Khamenei, retweeted a tweet saying people with dark skin faced being killed "in the next few minutes" if they walked out on American streets. Foreign Ministry spokesman Abbas Mousavi called on the US to "stop oppression and aggressive conducts against its people and let them breathe".
- Ireland – Taoiseach Leo Varadkar has said that there is an "absence of moral leadership" in the US following the murder of George Floyd.
- Palestine – The spokesperson of Hamas (the governing party in the Gaza Strip), Fawzi Barhoum, condemned the murder of Floyd which he stated, "These agencies are granted legitimacy and cover to commit their crimes and violations by their political leadership in the US Administration and the Zionist entity, which have [both] institutionalised violence and terrorism and exported them to many countries in the world. These dangerous policies ... need to be exposed and stood up to by all the free people of the world, and by the defenders of freedom and human dignity."
- Peru – President Martín Vizcarra expressed that the murder of Floyd is "a sign of racism and discrimination" that must be rejected. He said that according to what was answered in the last national census, most Peruvians felt discriminated at some time in their lives. Finally, he congratulated the Afro-Peruvian community on the Day of Afro-Peruvian Culture.
- Russia – The Ministry of Foreign Affairs said the United States had a history of systematic human rights abuses.
- South Africa – The African National Congress, the governing party in South Africa, released a statement calling for calm in the U.S., which was criticized for not mentioning similar deaths due to police action in South Africa.
- Turkey – President Recep Tayyip Erdoğan blamed Floyd's murder on a "racist and fascist approach" by the United States and said Turkey will be monitoring the issue, while extending condolences to his family and loved ones.
- United Kingdom – Prime Minister Boris Johnson said that "racist violence has no place in our society", and that he was "appalled and sickened" by the footage. He also urged people to "protest peacefully and in accordance with the rules on social distancing".
  - Scotland – The Scottish Parliament voted to end exports of rubber bullets, tear gas, and riot gear to the United States.
- Venezuela – President Nicolás Maduro accused President Trump of using the U.S. military against his own people and said that demonstrators are taking to the streets demanding an end to racism and police violence.

=== International organizations ===
- African Union – Officials, including Moussa Faki, the chairperson of the African Union Commission, criticized the murder.
- European Union – Josep Borrell, the European Union's foreign policy chief, said the bloc is "shocked and appalled" by the murder of black American George Floyd in police custody, calling it "an abuse of power" and warning against further excessive use of force. The European Parliament adopted a resolution in which it "strongly condemned the appalling death of George Floyd" as well as other similar killings throughout the world. The parliament also condemned "white supremacism in all its forms", and called on the American government to address its racist practices.
- United Nations – Michelle Bachelet, the United Nations High Commissioner for Human Rights, condemned the incident as one of many killings of unarmed African Americans, and called on the United States to take "serious action" and end the repeat of such killings. She also urged protestors to "express their demands for justice peacefully" and for police to refrain from further use of excessive force. On June 5, a group of 66 UN experts called the murder of George Floyd modern-day "racial terror" lynching in the US. "African Americans continue to experience racial terror in state-sponsored and privately organized violence ... In the US, this legacy of racial terror remains evident in modern-day policing", the group of experts quoted.

=== Religious leaders ===
- The Dalai Lama, in India while teaching students, condemned the murder of George Floyd by saying, "there are some who even take it as a pride to be able to kill somebody".
- Pope Francis addressed Floyd's murder during his weekly prayer at the Vatican on June 3: "Dear brothers and sisters in the United States, I have witnessed with great concern the disturbing social unrest in your nation in these past days, following the tragic death of Mr. George Floyd." He added: "We cannot tolerate or turn a blind eye to racism and exclusion in any form and yet claim to defend the sacredness of every human life."
- The Holy Synod of Bishops of the Orthodox Church in America issued a statement on May 31 condemning the murder of George Floyd: "We categorically reject racism in any form. Every human being is created in the image and likeness of God (Genesis 1:26–1:27) ... We are all, each of us, 'one in Christ Jesus (Galatians 3:28).' As such, there should be no hatred, no enmity, no hostility between us, but reconciliation." Calls for peace and prayers for George Floyd and his family were offered, as well as for, "those communities that are experiencing anxiety, sadness, and despair, because they have seen destruction of life and property."

== Misinformation ==
Conspiracy theories regarding the nature of Floyd's death and subsequent protests began spreading soon after the murder. Winnie Heartstrong, a Republican candidate for Congress, asserted that the footage of Floyd's murder was "created using deepfake technology – digital composites of two or more real persons", that the "real" Floyd had died in 2016, and that actors had been substituted in the roles of Floyd and Chauvin. Misinformation was spread about the presence of Antifa at protests after the murder, including assertions that they had been given a "training manual" on tactics to cause unrest by Democrats; some, including Texan agricultural commissioner Sid Miller, claimed that the protests were funded by George Soros. According to Zignal Labs, 873,000 pieces of misinformation were linked to the protests; 575,800 of those mentioned Antifa. The Los Angeles Times said on June 22, 2020, that some theories had been "amplified by a growing number of people on the far right, including some Republican leaders" but that "some Republicans (had) begun pushing back" on false claims and those spreading rumors.

On several occasions before Chauvin's trial, conservative political commentators Tucker Carlson and Candace Owens said that Floyd had died of drug-related complications or an overdose. Cynthia Brehm, the head of the Republican Party in Bexar County, Texas, said that the murder was a "staged event." Other conspiracy theories include the assertion that Darnella Frazier was paid to film the arrest, that those involved were crisis actors and a nearby building to the location of the murder was a Freemason lodge involved in the killing. During the initial stages of the protests, then-president Donald Trump tweeted that "ANTIFA led anarchists" were the causes of unrest. He also pledged, in other tweets, to have Antifa designated as a "terrorist organization", and used the phrase "when the looting starts, the shooting starts", an expression associated with Miami police chief Walter E. Headley, who said, in 1967, that his department "didn't mind being accused of police brutality".

== See also ==
- Memorials to George Floyd
