= List of snack foods by country =

This is a list of snack foods by country, specific to or originating in a particular community or region. Snack food is a portion of food often smaller than a regular meal, generally eaten as snacking between meals. Snacks come in a variety of forms including packaged and processed foods and items made from fresh ingredients at home.

== Asia ==
=== Indonesia ===
Name	Image	Description
Dodol		Rice flour-based small glutinous sweets, sweetened with coconut sugar, moulded and coloured. Often added fruit scent and taste such as durian
Emping		Crackers made from flattened Gnemon/Belinjo seeds
Gorengan		Fritters from Indonesia
Klepon		Boiled rice cake, stuffed with coconut sugar, and rolled in fresh grated coconut. It is flavoured with pandan leaves juice.
Kripik		A traditional chips or crisps, bite-size snack crackers that can be savoury or sweet
Krupuk		Deep fried crisps made from mainly tapioca flour, with added ingredients, such as prawn, fish, or garlic, and even ox/cow skin. It comes in different shapes and colours.
Lemper		A traditional rice cake, made from glutinous rice and filled usually with chicken
Otak-otak		Usually made from Spanish mackerel fish paste or Milkfish, spiced and wrapped in banana leaves, then grilled and served with peanut sauce
Perkedel jagung		Indonesian style corn fritter
Pisang goreng		A battered and deep-fried banana or plantain

=== Malaysia and Singapore ===
Name	Image	Description
Apam balik		Sweet turnover pancake common in Southeast Asia.
Curry puff		A type of snack or kuih. Usually filled with chicken and potato with a dried curry inside.
Keropok lekor		A keropok that is made from fish.
Roti John		A popular Malay sandwich in Malaysia and Singapore.

=== Maldives ===
Name	Image	Description
Gulha		Small savory ball-shaped dumplings that are stuffed with a mixture of tuna, onion, coconut, curry leaves and chili and then deep fried

== South America ==
=== Peru ===
Name	Image	Description
Chifle		A fried plantain snack from Peru and Ecuador

=== Brazil ===
Name	Image	Description
Coxinha		A chopped or shredded chicken meat, covered in dough and molded into a shape resembling a chicken leg, battered and fried
Paçoca		A Brazilian candy made out of ground peanuts, sugar and salt
Pastel		A half-circle or rectangle-shaped thin crust pies with assorted fillings, fried in vegetable oil

== Europe ==
=== Norway ===
Name	Image	Description
Knekkebrød		A flat and dry type of cracker, containing mostly rye flour
Kanelboller		A sweet bun seasoned with cinnamon and cardamon
Kokkosbolle		Cream-filled chocolate covered in shaved coconut
Møsbrømlefse		Lefse flatbread filled with goat cheese, buttermilk, syrup, and flour
Smultring		Cake donuts dusted with cardamom, cinnamon, lemon or orange zest, usually served during Christmastime

=== Sweden ===
Name	Image	Description
Mandelkubb		Bittersweet almond biscuit, otherwise known as an almond bun
Blodplättar		Pancake traditionally made with whipped reindeer blood and typically fried
Köttbullar		Smaller meatballs, otherwise known as the national food of Sweden
Semla		A traditional Swedish bun filled with almond paste and cream
Kladdkaka		Thin chocolate cake with a crispy exterior and gooey interior
Macka		Slice of bread topped with butter and a choice of spread, usually ham, cheese, or pâté
Swedish Nuts		Meringue-coated pecans, baked in butter

=== Finland ===
Name	Image	Description
Sultsina		Thinly rolled rye flour pastry, typically filled with either rice pudding or porridge
Karjalanpiirakka		Open-faced pastry with a rye flour crust, filled with rice porridge and topped with egg butter
Lörtsy		Deep fried half-moon-shaped pastry filled with jams or minced meats. Usually sold at street markets
Leipajuusto		Cheese derived from the beestings of a cow
Korvapuusti		Traditional Finnish cinnamon bun, translating to "slapped ears" in English
Lihapullat		Finnish meatballs, prepared using kermaviili, a Nordic curd cream
Perunarieska		Unleavened flatbread made primarily with mashed potatoes
Näkkileipä		Thick flatbread usually made with rye flour
Salmiakki		Salty liquorice candy

== Oceania ==
=== Australia ===
From Allen's (confectionery):

- Bites Mini Chocolate Raspberries
- Black Cats
- Cheekies
- Jaffas
- Minties
- Oak Flavoured Milk Bottles and Oak Iced Coffee Milk Bottles
- Red Ripper (confectionery)
- Sherbies Sour Fizz Chews
- Sourz Snakes Alive
- Sourz Tangy Randoms
- Spearmint Leaves (discontinued 2015; reintroduced 2020)

== See also ==
- List of Indian snacks
- List of Indonesian snacks
- List of Japanese snacks
- List of snack foods
