= Life Savers =

Mint- and fruit-flavored candy

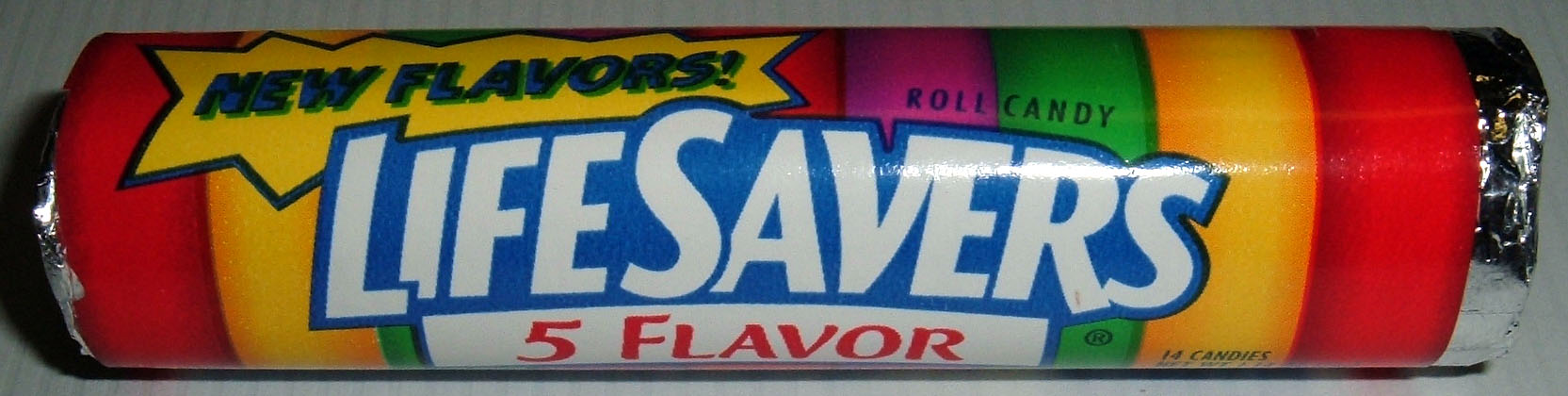
- Product type: Candy
- Current owner: Mars, Incorporated
- Produced by: Wrigley (US); Nestlé (Canada); Darrell Lea (Australia)
- Country: United States
- Introduced: 1912; 114 years ago
- Markets: North America
- Previous owners: Life Savers; Beech-Nut Life Savers; E. R. Squibb; Nabisco; Kraft Foods
- Website: life-savers.com

Life Savers (stylized as LIFE SAVERS) is an American brand of ring-shaped hard and soft candy. Its range of mints and fruit-flavored candies is known for its distinctive packaging, coming in paper-wrapped aluminum foil rolls.

Candy manufacturer Clarence Crane of Garrettsville, Ohio (father of the poet Hart Crane), invented the brand in 1912 as a "summer candy" that could withstand heat better than chocolate. The candy is so named due to its shape resembling that of a traditional ring-style life preserver also known as a "life saver".

After registering the trademark, Crane sold the rights to his Pep-O-Mint peppermint candy to then-entrepreneur Edward John Noble and his partner J. Roy Allen for $2,900. Instead of using cardboard rolls, which were not very successful, Noble created tinfoil wrappers to keep the mints fresh. Noble and Allen founded the Life Savers and Candy Company in 1913 and significantly expanded the market for the product by installing Life Savers displays next to the cash registers of restaurants and grocery stores. He also encouraged the owners of the establishments to always give customers a nickel in their change to encourage sales of the 5¢ Life Savers. The slogan "Still only 5 cents" helped Life Savers to become a favorite treat for children with a tight allowance. Since then, many different flavors of Life Savers have been produced. The five-flavor roll first appeared in 1935.

A series of mergers and acquisitions by larger companies began in 1956. Life Savers is currently a property of Mars, Incorporated. In recent decades, the brand expanded to include Gummi Savers in 1992, Life Saver Minis in 1996, Creme Savers in 1998, and Life Saver Fusions in 2001. Discontinued varieties include Fruit Juicers, Holes, Life Saver Lollipops, and Squeezit.

In 1995, a Life Savers drink was introduced to compete with Snapple and Fruitopia, but it was quickly discontinued.

== History ==
Life Savers was first created in 1912 by Clarence Crane, a candy maker from Garrettsville, Ohio (and father of the poet Hart Crane). Clarence had switched from the maple sugar business to chocolates the year before, but found that they sold poorly in the summer, because air conditioning was rare and they melted. He saw a machine pharmacies used to make pills that were round and wafer-shaped, and thought he would use those to make mints, which at the time were made square (because they were pressed in sheets and then sliced into squares). The machinery could also punch a hole in the center, and Crane named the candy after its resulting life preserver shape.

In 1913, Crane sold the formula for his Life Savers candy to Edward Noble of Gouverneur, New York, and his partner J. Roy Allen for $2,900. Noble and Allen started their own candy company and began producing and selling the mints known as Pep-O-Mint Life Savers. He also began to package the mints into rolls wrapped in tin foil to keep them from going stale. This process was done by hand until 1919, when machinery was developed by Edward Noble's brother, Robert Peckham Noble, to streamline the process.

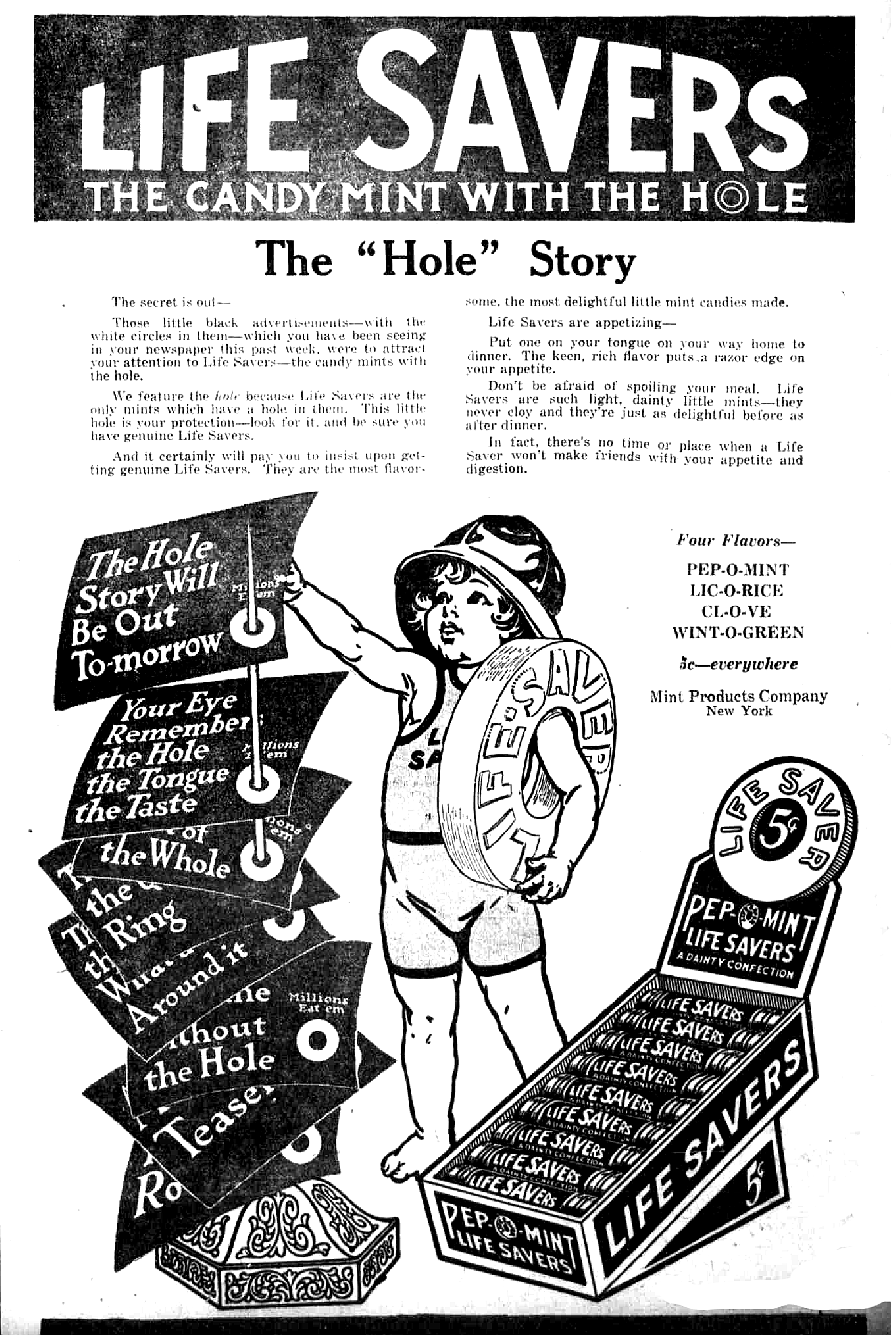
1917 newspaper ad for the product, showing the product packaging and the varieties available

Robert was a Purdue-educated engineer. He took his younger brother's entrepreneurial vision and designed and built the manufacturing facilities needed to expand the company. The primary manufacturing plant for Life Savers was located in Port Chester, New York, a local landmark replete with a Life Savers motif cast into the cornice. Robert led the company as its chief executive officer and primary shareholder for more than 40 years, until selling the company in the late 1950s.

By 1919, six other flavors (Wint-O-Green, Cl-O-Ve, Lic-O-Rice, Cinn-O-Mon, Vi-O-Let and Choc-O-Late) had been developed, and these remained the standard flavors until the late 1920s. In 1920, a new flavor called Malt-O-Milk was introduced. This flavor was received so poorly that it was discontinued after only a few years. In 1925, the tinfoil was replaced with aluminum foil.

Noble promoted the candy at the cash registers of saloons, cigar stores, drug stores, barber shops, and restaurants. He had the candy placed, with a five-cent price, near the cash register.

In 1921, the company began to produce solid fruit drops. In 1925, technology improved to allow a hole in the center of the fruit candies. These were introduced as the "fruit drop with the hole" and came in Orange, Lemon and Lime, each of which was packaged in its own separate rolls. In contrast to the opaque white mints previously produced by the company, these new candies were crystal-like in appearance. These new flavors quickly became popular with the public. Four new flavors were quickly introduced: anise, butter rum, cola, and root beer, which were made in the clear fruit drop style. Other than butter rum, which remains in the brand's lineup of flavors, these did not prove to be as popular as the three original fruit drop flavors. In 1931, the Life Savers "Cough Drop" was introduced with menthol, but it was not successful. In 1931, rolls of pineapple and cherry fruit drops were also introduced. As the public response proved positive for these, a new variety of mint called Cryst-O-Mint, made in this same crystal-like style, was introduced in 1932. In 1935, the classic "Five Flavor" rolls were introduced, offering a selection of five different flavors (pineapple, lime, orange, cherry, and lemon) in each roll. This flavor lineup was unchanged for nearly 70 years, until 2003, when three of the flavors were replaced in the United States, making the rolls pineapple, cherry, raspberry, watermelon, and blackberry. However, orange was subsequently reintroduced and blackberry was dropped. The original five-flavor lineup is still sold in Canada. In the late 1930s and early 1940s, four new mint flavors were introduced: Molas-O-Mint, Spear-O-Mint, Choc-O-Mint and Stik-O-Pep.

During the Second World War, other candy manufacturers donated their sugar rations to keep Life Savers in production so that the little candies could be shared with the armed forces as a reminder of life at home. Soon after the war ended, the manufacturing license was withdrawn. In 1947, U.K.-based Rowntree's—which formerly had been licensed to make Life Savers—started to manufacture a similar product called the Polo mint.

In 1981, Nabisco Brands Inc. acquired Life Savers from the E.R. Squibb Corporation. A number of early mint flavors, including Cl-O-Ve, Vi-O-Let, Lic-O-Rice and Cinn-O-Mon were discontinued due to poor sales. Nabisco introduced a new Cinnamon flavor ("Hot Cin-O-Mon") as a clear fruit drop-type candy. This replaced the white mint flavor Cinn-O-Mon, which had recently been discontinued. The other original mint flavors were retired. A number of other flavors were also quickly discontinued, after Nabisco took over, in order to make the business more profitable. In 2004, the U.S. Life Savers business was acquired by Wrigley's. Wrigley's introduced two new mint flavors (for the first time in over 60 years) in 2006: Orange Mint and Sweet Mint. They also revived some of the early mint flavors (such as Wint-O-Green).

Life Savers production was based in Holland, Michigan, until 2002, when it was moved to Montreal, Quebec, Canada, due to significantly lower sugar prices in the new location. The company's headquarters in Port Chester, New York, where Life Savers were made from 1920 until 1984, was distinctive. Although it has been converted to apartments, it still retains some Life Savers signage. It was added to the National Register of Historic Places in 1985.

The rights to the Life Savers brand in Australia and New Zealand were sold by Nestlé to Darrell Lea in 2018. As a result of the sale, production was shifted from New Zealand to Australia.

== Marketing and promotions ==
=== Jingle ===
The Life Savers jingle, "Life Savers, a Part of Living", was composed by Larry Hambro with lyrics by John "Jack" Keil, the creative director at Dancer Fitzgerald Sample advertising agency. The lead vocal was performed by Billie Hughes of the band Lazarus, who, along with the band, also provided harmony vocals and played the musical track. Arnold Brown served as the music director for Dancer Fitzgerald Sample, while Phil Ramone produced the recording session at A & R Recording.

=== Television ads ===
The Life Savers, a Part of the Living television campaign, celebrated everyday moments and the simple joys of life. The ads followed scenes of people in meaningful, emotional, or nostalgic situations with the signature jingle, "Life Savers, a Part of Living" playing beneath the visuals, culminating in a Life Saver’s Candy shared between them. The ads, reflecting themes of childhood, family, and friendship, evoked a nostalgic feeling and appreciation for life’s simple pleasures, making Life Savers candy a symbol of connection, sweetness, or comfort becoming a part of life’s experiences.

== Trademark litigation ==
The Life Savers brand has been subject to at least two cases of litigation defending the brand from accusations of trademark infringement, both in the United States and in the United Kingdom. In the U.S., in 1947, Life Savers filed suit against Curtiss Candy Company, claiming that the latter's multicolored packaging violated Life Savers' trademark.

== Timeline ==
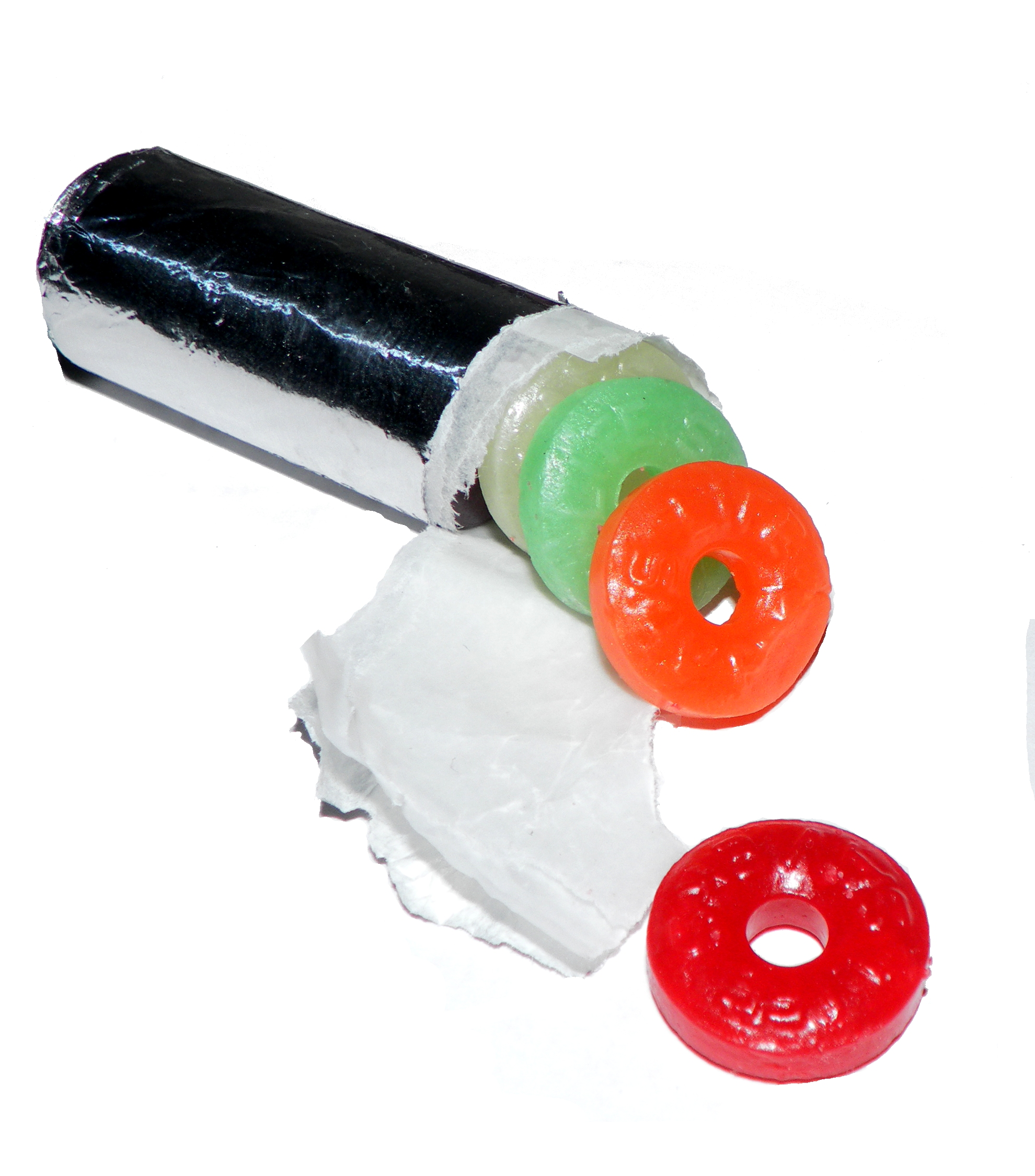
Life Savers fruit-flavored candies in the wax paper and aluminum foil wrapper, minus the outer paper wrapper

- 1912: Crane's Peppermint Life Savers created by Clarence Crane in Garrettsville, Ohio.
- 1913: Edward Noble bought the Life Saver formula, renamed Pep-O-Mint Life Savers, and started Mint Products Company in New York City.
- 1921: The first fruit flavors were produced as solid candies.
- 1925: Technology improved to allow a hole in the center of the fruit candies.
- 1927: Cherry flavor is invented and added to regular flavors.
- 1935: The original Five Flavor roll of Life Savers debuted.
- 1956: Life Savers Limited merged with Beech-Nut.
- 1968: Beech-Nut Life Savers merged with Squibb.
- 1981: Nabisco Brands Inc. acquired Life Savers from the E.R. Squibb Corporation.
- 1987: Canadian Life Savers business acquired by Hershey Canada.
- 1992: Life Savers Gummies launches in three varieties: Grape, Five Flavor, and Mixed Berry.
- 1996: Canadian Life Savers business acquired by Beta Brands Limited.
- 2000: Kraft acquires Nabisco.
- 2001: Kraft acquires Canadian Life Savers business from Beta Brands.
- 2004: Life Savers business acquired by Wrigley's.
- 2008: Mars acquires Wrigley.
- 2018: Australian Life Savers business acquired by Darrell Lea.

== See also ==
- Fruit Tingles – an Australian confectionary initially manufactured by Allen's, now manufactured by Nestlé's Wonka in Asia Pacific and by Darrell Lea in Australia
- Polo mints – a similar European confection by Nestlé, which had a trademark battle with Life Savers over the ring-shaped form
- Triboluminescence – an optical phenomenon in which light is generated when material is subject to mechanical breaking, especially noticeable when crushing Wint-O-Green Life Savers in the dark
