= Sterzing's Potato Chips =

Food Product

Sterzing's Potato Chips are produced and distributed in Burlington, Iowa, by Sterzing's Food Company. They were first produced in 1935.

== History ==
As a supplement to his candy business, Mr. Sterzing developed a process by which he sliced potatoes and slow cooked them one batch at a time. The ingredients, which remain unchanged today, are potatoes, salt, and oil.

In 2015 Sterzing were forced to change their recipe to comply with the U.S. Food and Drug Administration mandate which banned oils that contain trans fats. "We're holding on to our original product as best we can. That's our goal," said Smith.

In 1984, Sterzings began making tortilla chips, followed by a line of dips, and salsas.

Until the early 1990s, Sterzings did not deliver outside of a 100 mile radius of Burlington. Then in 1993, they began to deliver across the state of Iowa. A year later, they delivered throughout the Midwest. Their distribution reached worldwide in the early 2000s.

== Company headquarters ==
The company headquarters and processing plant are both located at 1818 Charles Street, in Burlington, Iowa.

== See also ==
- List of brand name snack foods
