= TNCC =

TNCC may refer to:

- Tainan City Council, the city council of Tainan, Taiwan
- Tamil Nadu Congress Committee, India
- The Natural Confectionery Company, owned by Cadbury Schweppes
- Thomas Nelson Community College, US
- Curaçao International Airport (ICAO code)
- Trauma Nursing Core Course, in the list of emergency medicine courses
