= Fruit Tingles =

Australian confectionery brand

- Type: Confectionery
- Place of origin: Australia
- Main ingredients: Sugar

Fruit Tingles is a brand of confectionery originating in Australia. They are a chalky-textured, multicoloured, disc-shaped, fruit flavoured lolly. Standard packages are 34g foil wrapped sleeves with an outer multicoloured paper wrapper, and contain 16 pieces of randomly distributed flavours. Four-pack packaging containing four rolls is common for supermarket sales.

Fruit Tingles have a long history in Australia and New Zealand, though details of their origin are sketchy. Originally manufactured by Allen's in Melbourne since the 1930s, they were rebranded in the 1990s as Wonka Fruit Tingles as part of Nestlé's purchase of the Allen's brand in 1985, and more recently became branded as Life Savers Fruit Tingles in the Asia Pacific region in 2005. They were only manufactured in New Zealand for a number of years.

As of April 2019, Life Saver branded Fruit Tingles are manufactured by Darrell Lea Confectionary in Ingleburn, NSW, Australia, with five types on sale: Fruit Tingles, Musk, Pep O Mint, Fruit Pastilles and Blackcurrant Pastilles.

While unique in flavour, and level of effervescence, they are most similar to Wonka brand Bottle Caps, SweeTarts in the US markets, and Refreshers in the UK.

== Nutritional information ==
Ingredient list: Sugar, Glucose Syrup (from Wheat), Sodium Bicarbonate, Food Acids (296, 334), Tapioca Starch, Stabiliser (1401), Flavours, Colours (102, 110, 124, 133). One piece (2.6g) - Energy: 10Cal / 42kJ, Sodium: 27 mg /1% DV, Carbohydrates: 2.5g /1%DV (2.4g from Sugars). Not a significant source of Fat, Cholesterol, Protein, or Dietary Fibre.

Fruit Tingles are Halal and Kosher confectionery.

== Medical ==
- Dental Decay: Fruit Tingle are high in sugar (over 80% of the ingredients are sugar), and have a pH of 2.35 making them extremely acidic, and thus damaging to tooth enamel.
- Since Darrell Lea took over production, the ingredients have included Modified Starch (1440) derived from wheat, and thus the product is no longer gluten-free.
