= Walter E. Headley =

Police chief of Miami, Florida, in the 1960s

Chief of Police of Miami, Florida
- In office August 1948 – November 16, 1968
- Succeeded by: Bernard L. Garmire

Personal details
- Born: Walter E. Headley; May 11, 1905 Philadelphia, Pennsylvania, U.S.
- Died: November 16, 1968 (aged 63) Miami, Florida, U.S.
- Children: 3
- Known for: "When the looting starts, the shooting starts"
- Police career
- Country: United States
- Department: Miami Police Department
- Service years: 1937–1968
- Military career
- Allegiance: United States
- Branch: United States Army
- Service years: 1920–1928

Walter E. Headley (May 11, 1905 – November 16, 1968) was the Chief of Police of Miami, Florida in the 1960s. Headley became famous for his use of the phrase "when the looting starts, the shooting starts". During his tenure as police chief, he was regarded as a popular public figure by many, in spite of his heavy-handed policies.

Headley was characterized in the 1969 Miami Report about the 1968 Miami riot for the National Commission on the Causes and Prevention of Violence as a "strong-minded, hardworking police chief" who "carried virtually unchanged into the late 1960s policies of dealing with minority groups which had been applied in Miami in the 1930s and even earlier". This was an apparent reference to policies promulgated by Headley's predecessor, Chief H. Leslie Quigg.

== Early life ==
Headley was born in Philadelphia in 1905. According to Headley, when he was 15, he stole his father's draft card and joined the U.S. Army. Following work as a riding instructor and sausage salesman, he joined the police in 1937.

Headley was made chief of police in August 1948.

== "When the looting starts, the shooting starts" ==
On December 26, 1967, during the civil unrest in the United States that occurred in the long, hot summer of 1967, Headley announced that six three-man teams of officers equipped with "shotguns and dogs" would respond to the "young hoodlums" from "Negro districts" in Miami with lethal force and stated "his men have been told that any force, up to and including death, is proper when apprehending a felon". In a pithy soundbite during the post-statement interview with reporters, Headley claimed that Miami had avoided "civil uprising and looting" because he had "let the word filter down that when the looting starts, the shooting starts".

Headley stated: "Felons are going to learn that they can't be bonded out from the morgue." Florida Governor Claude Kirk expressed his support for Headley's tactics: "Let them all know they will be dealt with [harshly]. We have the weapons to defeat crime. Not to use them is a crime in itself." Headley added "we don't mind being accused of police brutality."

== Death ==
Headley died of cardiac arrest in 1968 at the age of 63. He was replaced as chief of police by Bernard L. Garmire.
