= Chocolate bullets =

Chocolate-coated liquorice confectionery

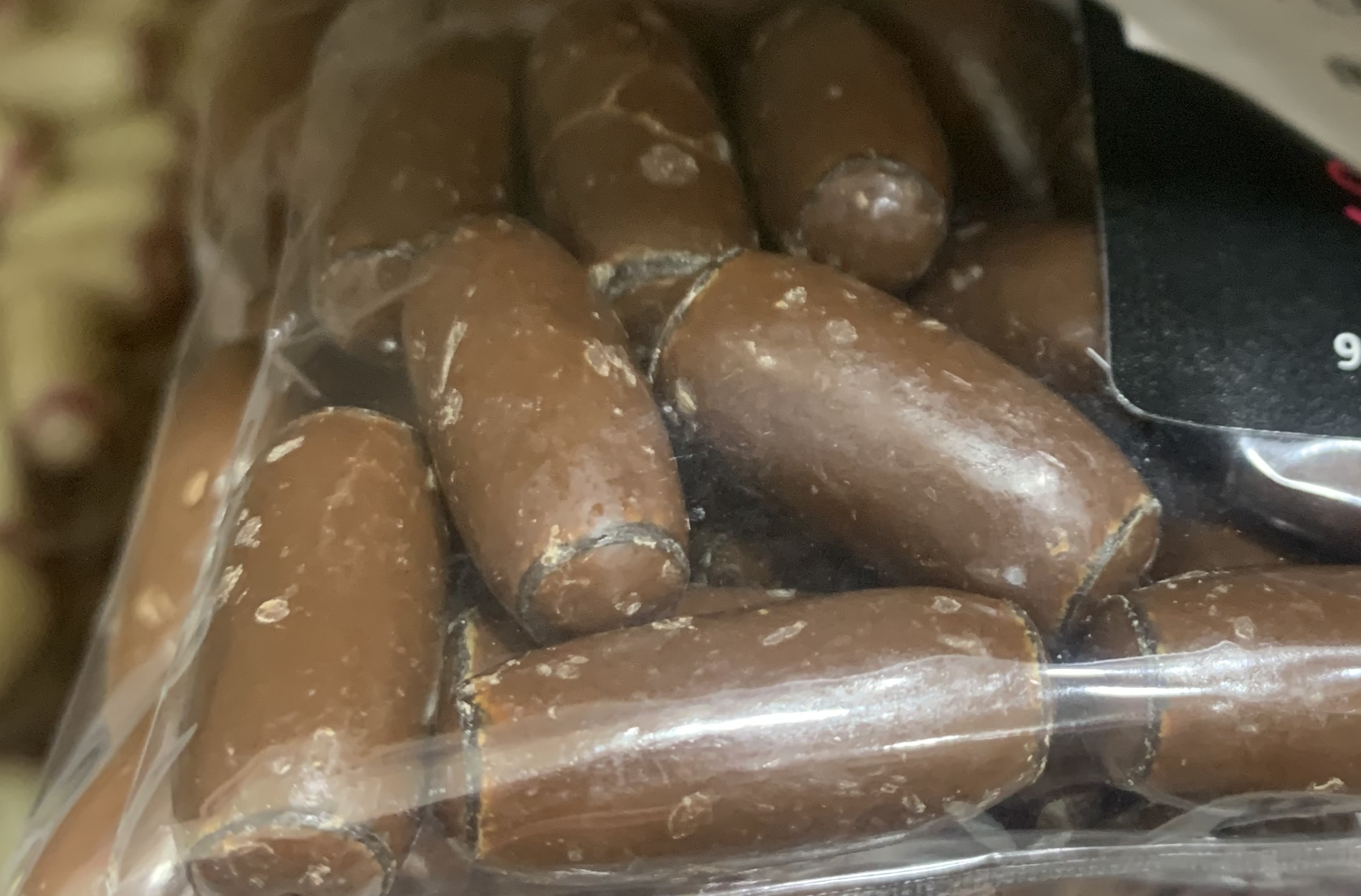
- Packaged chocolate bullets
- Type: Chocolate
- Course: Snack
- Place of origin: Australia
- Main ingredients: Liquorice, chocolate

Chocolate bullets (also known as liquorice bullets) are a confectionery sold in Australia and New Zealand by companies such as FYNA, Darrell Lea, RJ's Liquorice and Cadbury (the latter formerly as The Natural Confectionery Company).

The elliptical, oval-shaped, or cylindrical candy consists of a liquorice "bullet" coated with milk or dark chocolate. Traditionally, the bullet is made using black liquorice. However, varieties using red liquorice and white chocolate coatings are now also sold. Australian chocolate-coated bullets differ from similar liquorice bullets available in Ireland, which have a hardened sugar coating surrounding the liquorice centre.

Darrell Lea alone produces more than one billion chocolate bullets per year. In 2023, the company invested $45 million to expand its Sydney production facilities to export liquorice and chocolate bullets to the United States.

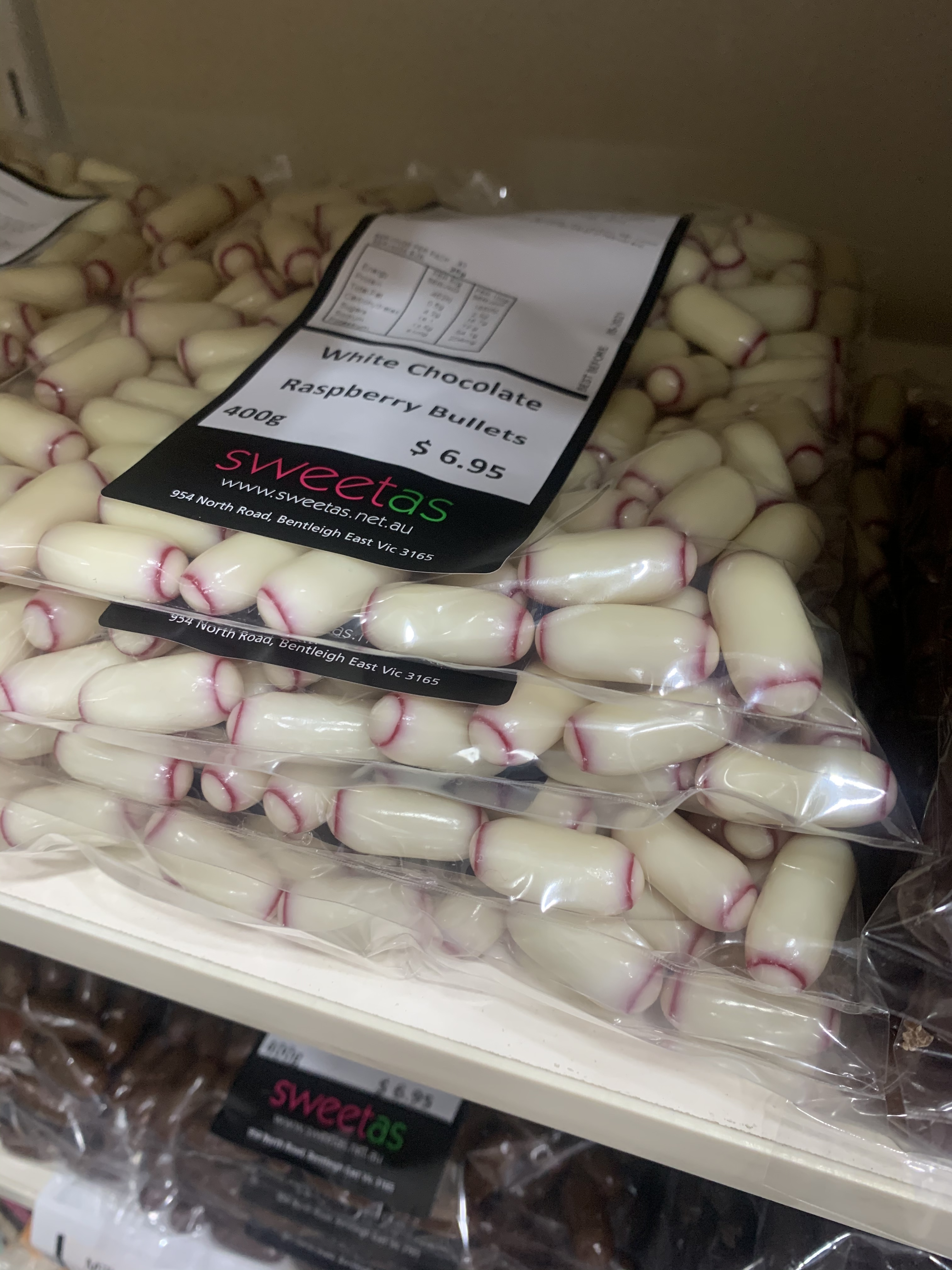
Raspberry and white chocolate bullets

In competitive sailing, the term "bullets" is sometimes used to refer to race wins. This is an idiom in Australian English that refers to chocolate bullets.
