= When the looting starts, the shooting starts =

American police brutality related phrase

- Context: Long, hot summer of 1967; 2020 George Floyd protests
- Coined by: Chief Walter E. Headley, Miami Police Department (1967)
- Meaning: Lethal force is justified against rioters and looters

"When the looting starts, the shooting starts" is a phrase originally used by Walter E. Headley, the police chief of Miami, Florida, in response to an outbreak of violent crime during the 1967 Christmas holiday season. He accused "young hoodlums, from 15 to 21", of taking "advantage of the civil rights campaign" that was then sweeping the United States. Having ordered his officers to combat the violence with shotguns, he told the press that "we don't mind being accused of police brutality". The quote may have been borrowed from a 1963 comment from Birmingham, Alabama police chief Bull Connor. It was featured in Headley's 1968 obituary published by the Miami Herald.

The quote was similarly used and possibly repeated by Headley himself in response to the 1968 Miami riots. Variations of the quote were subsequently used by other political figures, such as Alabama governor George Wallace, Philadelphia police commissioner and eventual mayor Frank Rizzo, and Chicago mayor Richard J. Daley, and in 2020 by U.S. president Donald Trump.

Headley's quote was initially criticized by The Miami Report for exacerbating the violence in the 1968 Miami riots. The quote was brought under scrutiny by the U.S. Congress in response to the 1968 Washington, D.C., riots. It was also scrutinized in retrospect to the violence caused during the 1980 Miami riots. Trump's usage of the quote during the 2020 George Floyd protests was flagged by Twitter for encouraging violence, and it was criticized by various politicians of U.S. cities and states. Facebook CEO Mark Zuckerberg's decision not to remove Trump's use of the phrase in a Facebook post led to criticism and protests by Facebook employees.

== Walter Headley, 1967 ==
Chief Walter Headley was characterized in The Miami Report about the 1968 Miami riot for the National Commission on the Causes and Prevention of Violence as a "strong-minded, hardworking police chief" who "carried virtually unchanged into the late 1960s policies of dealing with minority groups which had been applied in Miami in the 1930s and even earlier". This was an apparent reference to policies promulgated by Headley's predecessor, Chief H. Leslie Quigg. (Note: As an example, Quigg was indicted in 1928 after three Miami police officers beat Harry Kier, a Black bellboy, to death for allegedly insulting a white woman at the hotel where he worked. Although he was taken into custody in late March, the criminal charges were dismissed by May because the witness did not testify.) Howard University political science professor Clarence Lusane stated that Chief Headley "had a long history of bigotry against the Black community".

=== Response to the long, hot summer of 1967 ===
"We don't mind being accused of police brutality. They haven't seen anything yet.
"Ninety per cent of our Negro population is law abiding and wants to eliminate our crime problem. But 10 per cent are young hoodlums who have taken advantage of the civil rights campaign.
"Community relations and all that sort of thing has failed. We have done everything we could, sending speakers out and meeting with Negro leaders. But it has amounted to nothing.
"We haven't had any serious problems with civil uprising and looting because I've let the word filter down that when the looting starts, the shooting starts. These are my orders: Not three days after, but now.
"This is war. I meant it, every bit of it."

— Chief Walter E. Headley, Miami Police Department, press conference (December 26, 1967).

During the civil unrest in the United States that occurred during the long, hot summer of 1967, which were in part racially motivated, several nascent riots in Dade County, Florida, were stopped before they could start through the effort of local community leaders. However, law enforcement personnel began to prepare for further violence, as the causes of the unrest were never addressed and promises made by leaders went unfulfilled.

The first known use of the phrase was in a press conference held by Miami's police chief, Walter Headley, on December 26, 1967. Headly announced that six three-man teams of officers equipped with "shotguns and dogs" would respond to the "young hoodlums" from "Negro districts" in Miami with lethal force and stated "his men have been told that any force, up to and including death, is proper when apprehending a felon". In a pithy soundbite during the post-statement interview with reporters, Headley claimed that Miami had avoided "civil uprising and looting" because he had "let the word filter down that when the looting starts, the shooting starts".

Headley stated: "Felons are going to learn that they can't be bonded out from the morgue." Florida Governor Claude Kirk expressed his support for Headley's tactics: "Let them all know they will be dealt with [harshly]. We have the weapons to defeat crime. Not to use them is a crime in itself." Headley added "we don't mind being accused of police brutality." In a follow-up press conference, Headley refused to say whether the policy of shooting looters would only be applied to Blacks, given his previous stances, leading to a heightened state of fear among the Black communities of Miami.

A paraphrased version of his December 1967 remarks was quoted in his 1968 Miami Herald obituary: "There is only one way to handle looters and arsonists during a riot and that is to shoot them on sight. I've let the word filter down — when the looting starts, the shooting starts." Anecdotes were shared that City of Miami police officers had started aggressively enforcing its stop-and-frisk law by stopping Black males in public with no pretext, calling them belittling or racist epithets, then demanding identification and their purpose. Three weeks after the new policy started, Chief Headley declared that it had caused the violent crime rate to fall by 60%. In contrast to the continuous harassment by Miami police officers, the Dade County Public Safety Department built relationships between its deputy sheriffs and the Black community; although both the City of Miami and Dade County were judged to have effectively maintained order, the Miami Police Department were perceived to have revived prior racist policies.

According to Lusane, Headley might have actually borrowed the phrase from infamous Birmingham, Alabama, police chief Bull Connor. Connor had declared in 1963 he would use dogs and fire hoses to quell unrest.

=== Response to 1968 Miami riot ===
In August 1968, riots broke out in Miami, at the time of the 1968 Republican National Convention in Miami Beach. The first riot started in the Liberty City area on August 7 at approximately 6:30 p.m., marking the first major incident since Headley's get-tough policing policy had been announced in December 1967. Black organizations had called for a noontime mass rally for "Blacks Only", attracted by rumors that Ralph Abernathy and Wilt Chamberlain would be speaking. As the crowd grew that afternoon, police responded and became the target of the crowd's ire. Traffic controls were enforced at 5 p.m. and the rally turned violent after the driver of a car with the sticker "George Wallace for President" blundered into the roadblocks, panicked, and abandoned the car, which was subsequently flipped and set ablaze. Rioting and looting was quieted by the police by 8:15 p.m., without significant incident. Politicians (including the Mayor of Miami, Stephen P. Clark; Mayor of Metropolitan Dade County, Charles Hall; Governor Kirk; and Ralph Abernathy) arrived and urged the crowd to negotiate peacefully, and with the officials' promise to meet to hear the community's grievances at 11 a.m. on August 8, the crowd dispersed.

It is not unfair to characterize the Headley policy as one of keeping an underprivileged and restless minority orderly and cowed by a constant visual display of force in its more ominous and symbolic forms, e.g., shotguns and police dogs, coupled with frequent harshly-executed acts of stopping and frisking or stopping for questioning, and whether consciously planned or not, occasional acts of brutality. Quite apart from more basic legal and ethical problems, the greatest failings of this policy are that it creates grievances which can accumulate until they actually cause a riot and that the training and equipping of police for the application of such a policy does not prepare them to cope with a major riot once it starts. We are not convinced that police dogs and shotguns can be used to quell a riot without widespread indiscriminate and useless bloodshed and simultaneously sowing the seeds for future disturbances. And once a riot starts, police dogs sitting in their mobile cages or shotguns sticking out of the windows of police cars — the most usual modes of display — will have little or no effect on the rioters.
[...] We think, in short, that the use of instruments of terror to hold potential disturbances in check eventually fails to hold them in check and then is of little or no use in quelling a disturbance once it starts.

— Miami Report (1969)

After the politicians reneged on their promise, the riot reignited on August 8. That day, in two separate incidents, two Black adults were killed by gunfire in Liberty City in the afternoon, then another was killed in the Central Negro District just before midnight. A New York Times article published November 29, 1970, blamed Headley's approach for "three dead and a score wounded" during the riots. Headley was on vacation in the North Carolina mountains during the riots and refused to return to Miami, asserting that "my officers know what to do. They can handle the situation." The same article from 1970 also stated that Headley had repeated the phrase "when the looting starts, the shooting starts" during the 1968 Miami riots, although contemporary coverage only brought up that line as Headley's stated policy from the December 1967 press conference. The Miami Report squarely blamed Headley's policies for exacerbating the violence of the riots.

Following Headley's death in 1968, the "hardline-policy chief of the old school" was replaced by Chief Bernard L. Garmire, as part of an "attempt at racial introspection" which had included consulting a federally-funded social science study to examine what "engenders" white police officers' deep "fear and hatred of Blacks". In 1971, Garmire put 24 police dog units on full-time duty to combat "the specter of urban guerrilla warfare", adding that he had not rescinded Headley's order to carry shotguns, but denied that he would be adopting his predecessor's philosophies: "There will be no promiscuous shooting or turning of dogs on people."

Headley's comment and policy were the subject of congressional testimony about the 1968 Washington, D.C., riots in a question asked by congressman John Dowdy to police chief Patrick V. Murphy.

== Contemporary views, 1967–1968 ==
Chief Headley's justifications of deadly force against rioters were echoed by other nationally prominent politicians, including presidential candidate George Wallace (in 1967/68), Philadelphia police commissioner Frank Rizzo (1968), and Chicago Mayor Richard J. Daley (1968).

=== George Wallace, 1967–1968 ===
Wallace's speeches during his 1968 Presidential campaign were widely publicized to contain similar sentiments as early as September 1967.

Journalist John Pilger published an interview with Wallace in 1986, which Pilger dated to summer 1968. During the interview, Wallace said he would issue orders similar to Headley's, authorizing deadly force against looters: "Nigra or white starts lootin' and bam, bam, I'd have 'em shot on the spot. Yessuh, there'd be orders to shoot to kill if anyone so much as hurls a rock at a police officer. 'Don't shoot any chillun,' I'd tell 'em. 'Just shoot that adult standin' beside the kid that throws the rock.' That may not prevent the burnin' and lootin' but it sure will stop it after it starts."

=== Frank Rizzo, 1967–1968 ===
"Any big city that doesn't have enough manpower to move in fast, in numbers, is in real trouble. Of course, if you move in and just stand there, the numbers do you no good. Tell the crowd to disperse; give them fair warning. But if they don't obey, they should be taken on, immediately. The man to go after is the one that shouts 'Burn!' or 'Loot!' He has to be taken on, and taken on good, and put right in short pants.
"There's no place in our form of government for a riot, for insurrection, for anarchy. Nobody's going to loot a city here. Nobody's going to sack a city. That's a promise.
"... There will be no backing off of police here. Force will be used. The real troublemakers cannot be satisfied. They just take attempts to meet their demands as a form of weakness. You have to meet them with absolute force.
"... All I can say is that the first bottle thrown, the first brick thrown, the first Molotov cocktail, the first time police are fired on, force will be met with force—and I'm tired of hearing this 'just a little bit more force.' If they fire on us, I assure you we won’t use the least amount of force. We have to use force just as the Army does. It's war. But I don't think we will ever need federal troops. We're becoming familiar with guerrilla tactics, and we have the weapons to fight a war. I consider myself an expert in city warfare, and I don't know of any problem we can't handle. We may have a riot here, but it will be the shortest riot in history."

— Commissioner Frank Rizzo, Philadelphia Police Department, quoted in Esquire (March 1968)

Although Frank Rizzo was credited by President Donald Trump with coining the phrase or "an expression like that" in a 2020 interview with Harris Faulkner, Rizzo never said "when the looting starts, the shooting starts." Rizzo served as the police commissioner of Philadelphia from 1967 to 1971, then resigned to run a successful campaign for mayor that year, serving from 1972 with a second term, until 1980. He was noted for his strict policies to prevent riots: "Hoodlums have no license to burn and sack Philadelphia in the name of civil liberties and civil rights activities." Rizzo further explained his preventive tactics, which included stationing snipers on rooftops and deploying anti-riot squads armed with shotguns and machine guns, in an article published in the March 1968 issue of Esquire written by Garry Wills. One key to Rizzo's tactics was keeping police officers on standby for rapid deployment if necessary, which met with great approval from his peers. Another aspect was Rizzo's willingness to use "absolute force" to suppress riots. Rizzo's policy on quelling riots was paraphrased and quoted in the report Firearms, Violence, and Civil Disorders (1968).

His policies were credited with preventing serious rioting in Philadelphia during the summer of 1967, while cities with a similar proportion of Black Americans, such as Detroit and Newark, were affected. The next year, Chicago, Baltimore, and Washington, D.C. all experienced significant riots in April 1968 after the assassination of Martin Luther King, Jr., and a contemporary analysis by Drew Pearson gave credit to "one of the toughest cops in the USA", Commissioner Frank Rizzo, and his "well integrated" police force for preventing similar rioting in Philadelphia.

Rizzo also was accused of encouraging brutal police tactics, which he denied: "I don't believe in police brutality and 99 per cent of the police have no part of it. Sure, there are isolated cases when a cop goes overboard, but who knows the right amount of force to use—and when?" Rizzo later clarified: "Our policemen are cool-headed professionals. We only use sufficient force." However, the club-swinging police action led by Rizzo that broke up the November 1967 Philadelphia student demonstration resulted in a suit which alleged that excessive force had been used. The suit would be appealed to the Supreme Court of the United States.

=== Richard Daley, 1968 ===
Mayor Richard J. Daley ordered police to shoot arsonists and looters during the 1968 Chicago riots that followed the assassination of Martin Luther King, Jr. in April 1968. Daley did not use the phrase "when the looting starts, the shooting starts", but stated to Police Superintendent James B. Conlisk "very emphatically and very definitely that an order be issued under [your] signature to shoot to kill any arsonist or anyone with a Molotov cocktail, and shoot anyone looting stores in our city". Upon hearing that Conlisk had directed patrolmen to use their own discretion, Daley remarked "I would assume any superintendent would issue orders to shoot any arsonist on sight ... an arsonist is a murderer and should be shot right on the spot. The looters—you wouldn't want to shoot the youngsters—but you can shoot them and detain them."

Chief Headley supported Daley's position: "That could have been me talking." However, Headley was reprimanded for his remarks of support and later clarified that he was strictly talking about the response to riots in Chicago, not general policing in Miami, and said that his officers had been instructed to "shoot when necessary". Looters, he said "should be given the opportunity to surrender to arrest" and if the looter resists, "anything it takes, including death, [should be used] to apprehend them."

Chicago under Daley also saw police violence soon after amid the 1968 Democratic National Convention protest activity.

== Armed vigilantes ==
The 1980 Miami riots erupted in the Liberty City area after four white police officers were acquitted on charges of manslaughter. The four were part of the group that had beaten Black motorcyclist Arthur Lee McDuffie to death in December 1979 following a high-speed chase; they had initially covered up their role in his killing by reporting his injuries were caused by a traffic accident. Photographic coverage of the riots in the Miami Herald included armed National Guardsmen, vigilantes, and business owners defending properties from looters. In 1989, former Miami mayor Maurice Ferré was interviewed for the documentary film Eyes on the Prize II: America at the Racial Crossroads 1965 to 1985; during the interview, he partially blamed the attitude instilled by Chief Headley for both the armed vigilantes and the police force's inability to suppress the McDuffie riots: "There's a tradition that goes back to Chief Walter Headley whose famous statement — famous in this community and the State of Florida — is when the looting starts, the shooting starts. That's the tradition. This was a southern city which is what Miami was up until the arrival of the Cubans in 1960. And this community has changed totally. But the mentality of that police department continues; it has life, it has a history."

During the 1992 Los Angeles riots, approximately half the property damage was sustained by businesses owned by immigrants from South Korea; because Koreatown had largely been abandoned by the police, local business owners armed themselves to defend their businesses.

=== "You loot, we shoot" ===
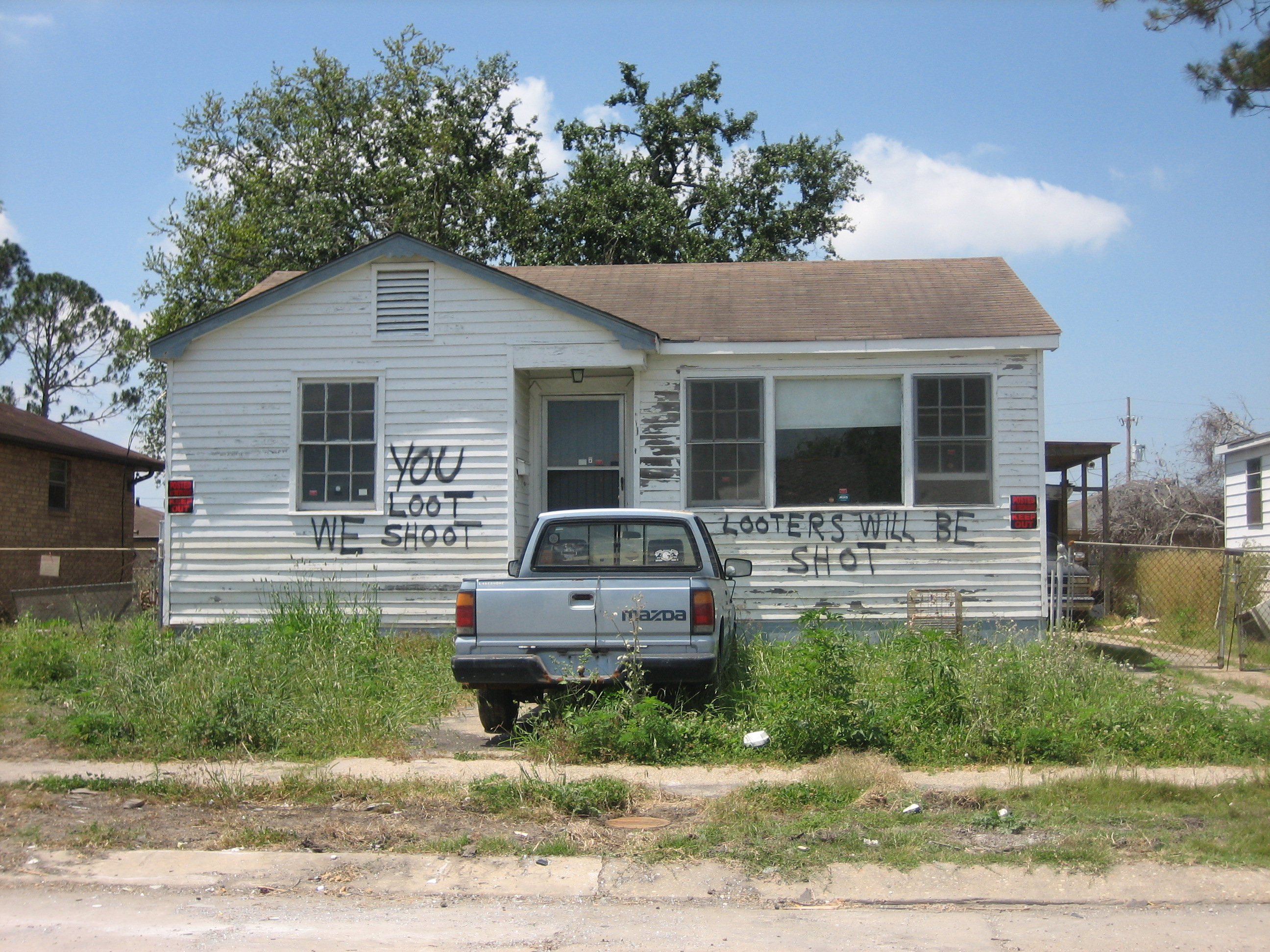
"You loot we shoot" painted on flood-damaged house in New Orleans (Apr 2006)

In the aftermath of Hurricanes Katrina (2005), Ike (2008), Sandy (2012), and Harvey (2017), would-be robbers were warned that vigilante deadly force would be used for property crimes through hand-painted signs that read "you loot, we shoot". Authorization of deadly force by police officers following natural disasters dates back at least as far as the 1906 San Francisco earthquake, when Mayor Eugene Schmitz declared "The federal troops, which are now policing a portion of the city, as well as the regular and special members of the police force, have been authorized by me to kill any persons whomsoever, found engaged in looting the effects of any citizen or otherwise engaged in the commission of crime."

Reports of vigilantes shooting black Americans in New Orleans during the aftermath of Katrina had circulated since 2005, most notably centered on the Algiers Point neighborhood. In 2010, The New Orleans Times-Picayune reported that officers of the New Orleans Police Department had been authorized to shoot looters, although none of the officers involved in 11 civilian shootings cited that order in their defense. Mayor Ray Nagin had requested a declaration of martial law in response to reports of widespread looting, but lacked the authority to declare it.

British street artist Banksy repurposed the same phrase in a 2018 piece depicting a stockbroker fleeing the New York Stock Exchange with bundles of cash.

== Donald Trump, 2020 ==
=== Response to George Floyd protests ===
Avatar of Donald Trump

Donald Trump
(@realDonaldTrump)
tweeted:

Replying to @realDonaldTrump

....These THUGS are dishonoring the memory of George Floyd, and I won't let that happen. Just spoke to Governor Tim Walz and told him that the Military is with him all the way. Any difficulty and we will assume control but, when the looting starts, the shooting starts. Thank you!

May 29, 2020

President Donald Trump used the phrase in a tweet on the evening of May 28–29, 2020, (Note: According to the timestamp, the original tweet was posted at 12:53 a.m. EDT on May 29, 2020. President Trump tweeted again later that day to clarify the intent of the original tweet and referred to the original tweet as being made "last night".) in response to increasingly violent nation-wide and international protests in response to the murder of George Floyd. Floyd was an African-American man murdered in Minneapolis on May 25 by a white policeman who knelt on Floyd's neck for more than nine minutes.

Trump's tweet was flagged by Twitter with a "public interest notice" for "glorifying violence". As a result, the tweet could only be seen after users acknowledged a notice saying the tweet had violated Twitter's rules against encouraging violence, but otherwise it remained visible. The original tweet was shared again that afternoon in quotation marks by the White House Twitter account. The White House's tweet was also hidden and tagged by Twitter as "glorifying violence".

In the aftermath of Trump's tweet, Lori Lightfoot and Keisha Lance Bottoms, the then-mayors of Chicago and Atlanta respectively, both stated that Trump was giving a dog whistle to what they considered his racist base, authorizing the use of vigilante violence to quell rioting. According to Lightfoot: "Nobody is gonna sit and condone looting and violence. But to blanketly say as the president of the United States that you're encouraging people to be shot in the street? That’s what I'm concerned about and, frankly, everyone should be concerned about that. That's not leadership. That's cowardice. That's playing to a base with the biggest dog whistle possible." Bottoms compared Trump's tweet to the ones Trump had made in the wake of the Unite the Right rally in Charlottesville, adding: "He speaks and he makes it worse. There are times when you should just be quiet and I wish that he would just be quiet." Kentucky governor Andy Beshear called on Trump to retract the original tweet.

Trump later characterized the original tweet as a warning that looters pose the risk of being shot, not as a command to shoot looters. On the evening of May 29, after speaking with Floyd's family, he struck a more somber tone. He said that he was not aware of the phrase's "racially-charged history", adding that he did not know where the phrase had originated, and that his intent in using it was to say "when there's looting, people get shot and they die."

On June 11, 2020, Fox News' Harris Faulkner asked Trump if he knew who had originally said the phrase; Trump responded that he believed it had been the mayor of Philadelphia. Faulkner noted the correct origin (Headley, 1967) and meaning (shooting looters).

=== Facebook response ===
In the afternoon of May 29, Facebook's CEO Mark Zuckerberg said in a personal statement that he found the comments (which had been posted to Facebook as well) "deeply offensive", but he also believed the posts were different from those that threaten or incite violence because they were about the use of "state force". Trump called Zuckerberg hours after the initial post, and Trump explained the initial post was intended to be a warning, which he publicly reiterated by posting on Twitter and Facebook; Zuckerberg stated his decision was influenced by Trump's explanation. On June 1, hundreds of Facebook employees staged a virtual walk-out from work, in protest. That evening, after a call with Zuckerberg and Facebook COO Sheryl Sandberg, three civil rights leaders said, "We are disappointed and stunned by Mark's incomprehensible explanations for allowing the Trump posts to remain up ... he refuses to acknowledge how Facebook is facilitating Trump's call for violence against protesters."

On June 2, Zuckerberg stated on an internal call with 25,000 Facebook employees that his review concluded "the reference is clearly to aggressive policing — maybe excessive policing — but it has no history of being read as a dog whistle for vigilante supporters to take justice into their own hands." Thirty-three former employees posted an open letter to Facebook on June 3 disputing that conclusion: "President Trump's post on Friday not only threatens violence by the state against its citizens, it also sends a signal to millions who take cues from the President." As an experiment, an anonymous Facebook page was created on June 4, reposting Trump's Facebook content verbatim, including "when the looting starts"; that specific repost was flagged on June 11 for violating Community Standards on violence and incitement.

The Facebook Oversight Board, which had first been announced in November 2018 as an independent board to review the company's content moderation decisions, declined to review the post because the Board was not yet operational. Later in June, Facebook announced new policies to label posts that violated the platform's hate speech rules, but also stated that Trump's initial post would not have qualified.
