= Allen's =

Australian confectionery brand

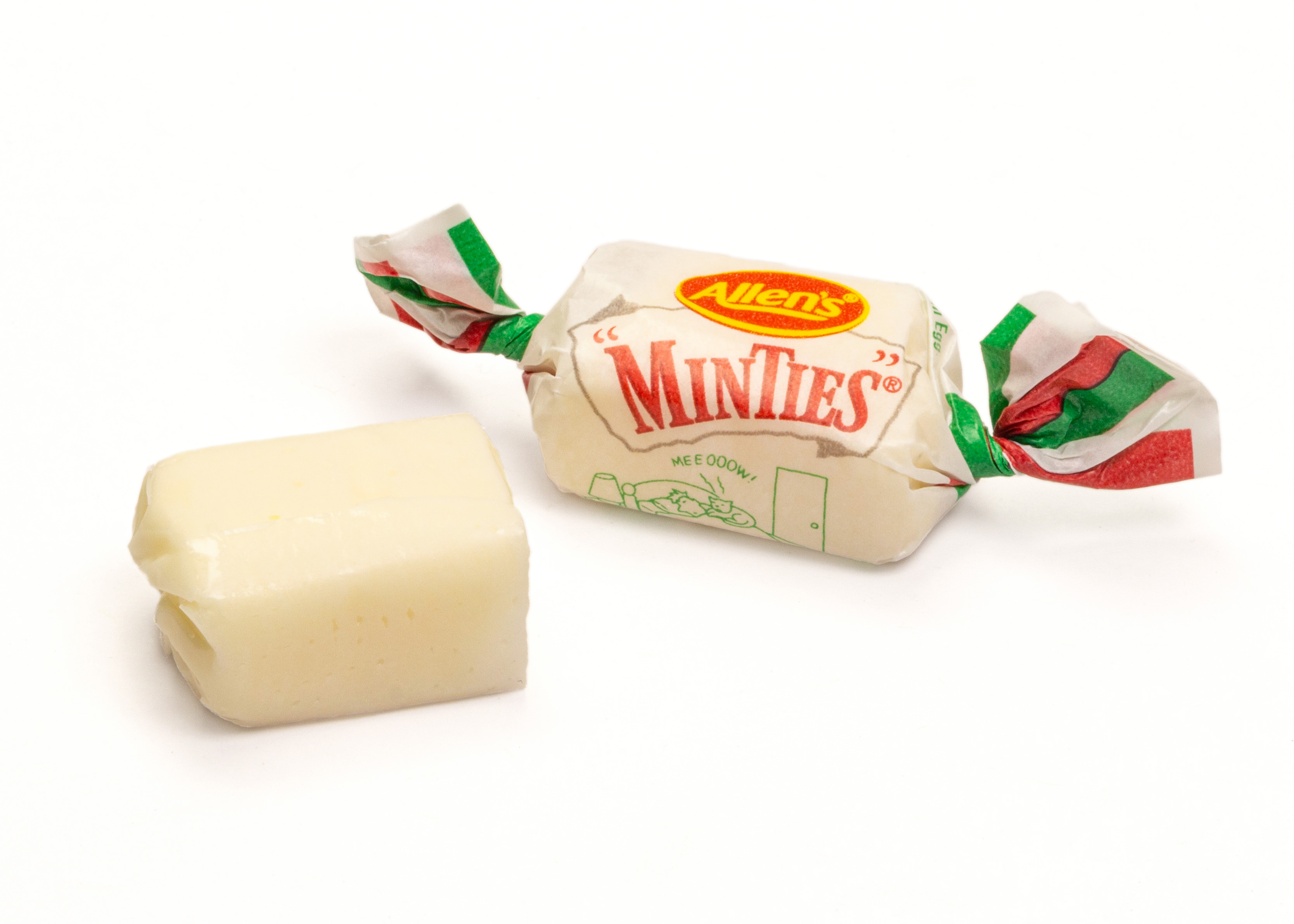
- Allen's "Minties" candy
- Product type: Confectionery
- Current owner: Nestlé
- Country: Australia
- Introduced: 1891; 135 years ago
- Related brands: List: Cheekies; Jaffas; Minties; Oak; Red Ripperz
- Markets: Australia
- Previous owners: Rothmans Holdings
- Tagline: "A little bit of fun since 1891"
- Website: nestle.com.au/allens

Allen's, earlier A. W. Allen Limited, is an Australian brand of confectionery products produced by Nestlé. Allen's is the top brand of sugar confectionery in Australia. It is best known for Minties, a soft chewable mint-flavoured confectionery, and their varieties of "Party Mix" lollies.

== History ==
Allen's was founded by Alfred Weaver Allen (1870–1925), a Melbourne confectioner. Originally employed by MacRobertson's, he commenced confectionery production in 1891 at his Fitzroy confectionery shop. By 1909, Allen's was the third largest confectionery business in Melbourne, after those of MacRobertson and Abel Hoadley. It launched as a public company in 1922. It moved from an adjacent site to a vast factory built to the design of prominent Melbourne architect Joseph Plottel in South Melbourne on the banks of the Yarra River (which had formerly housed Holden's first Australian plant and Kraft Walker Foods), in the 1950s. Its animated neon sign was a local landmark up to its demise in 1987.

Allen's abandoned chocolate production after World War II, however it became Australia's largest confectionery company. Allen's was purchased by UK-based Rothmans Holdings in 1985. Two years later it was sold to Nestlé. Allen's have been manufacturing confectionery in the town of Broadford, in Central Victoria, Australia since 1982. The manufacturing facility operates 24 hours a day, 5 days a week and Allen's has become synonymous with the town.

== Products and brands ==
=== Current ===
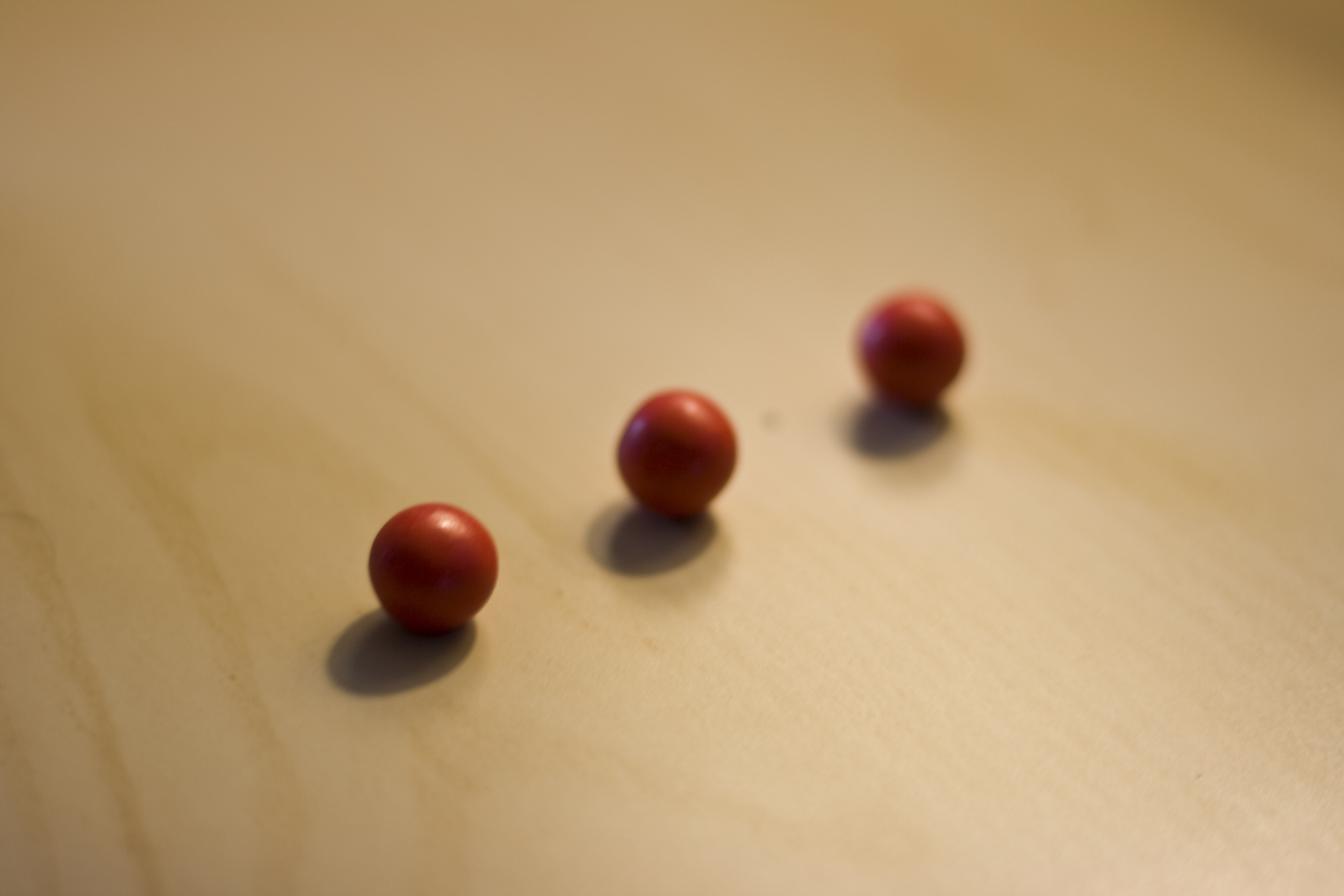
Jaffas

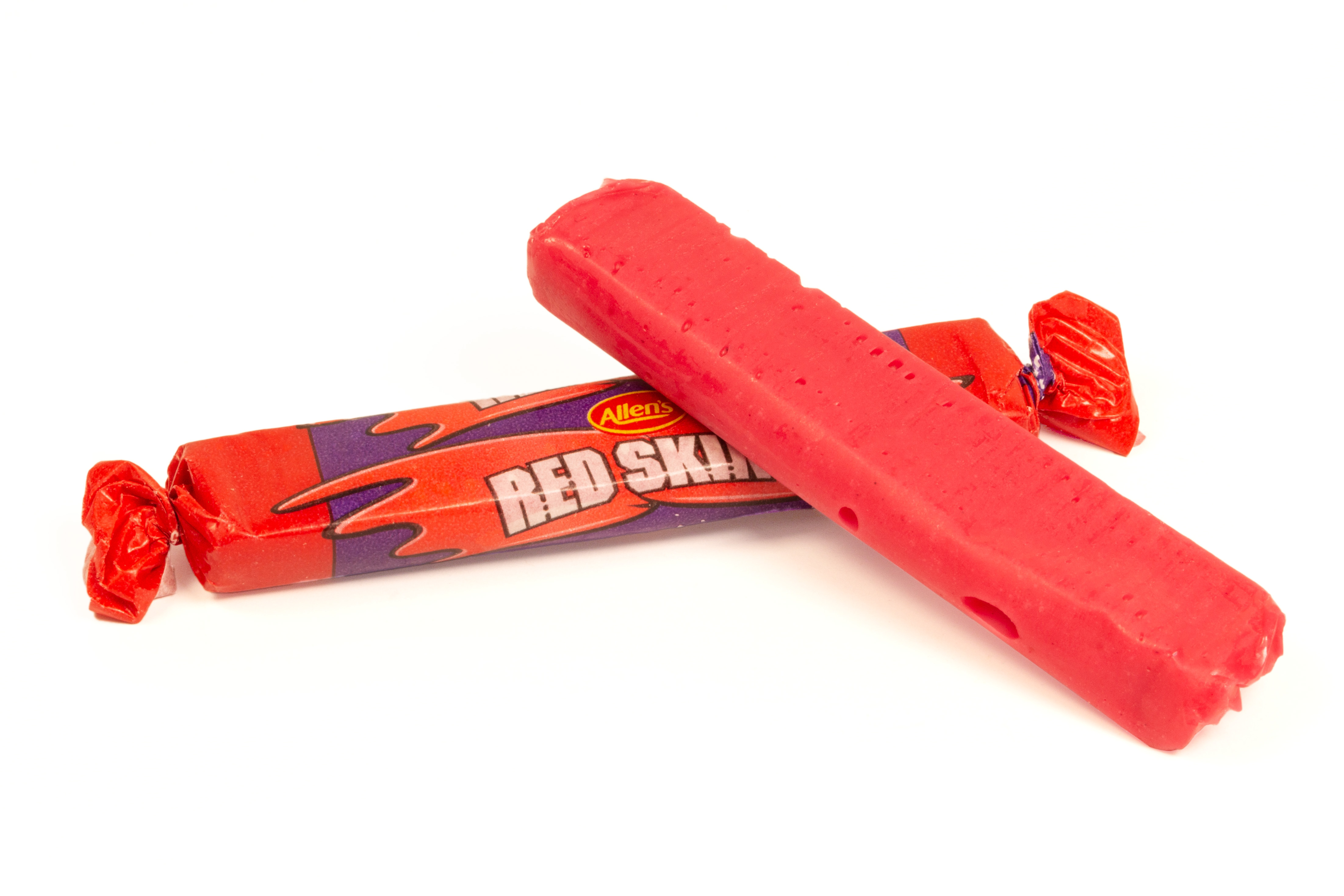
Red Ripperz

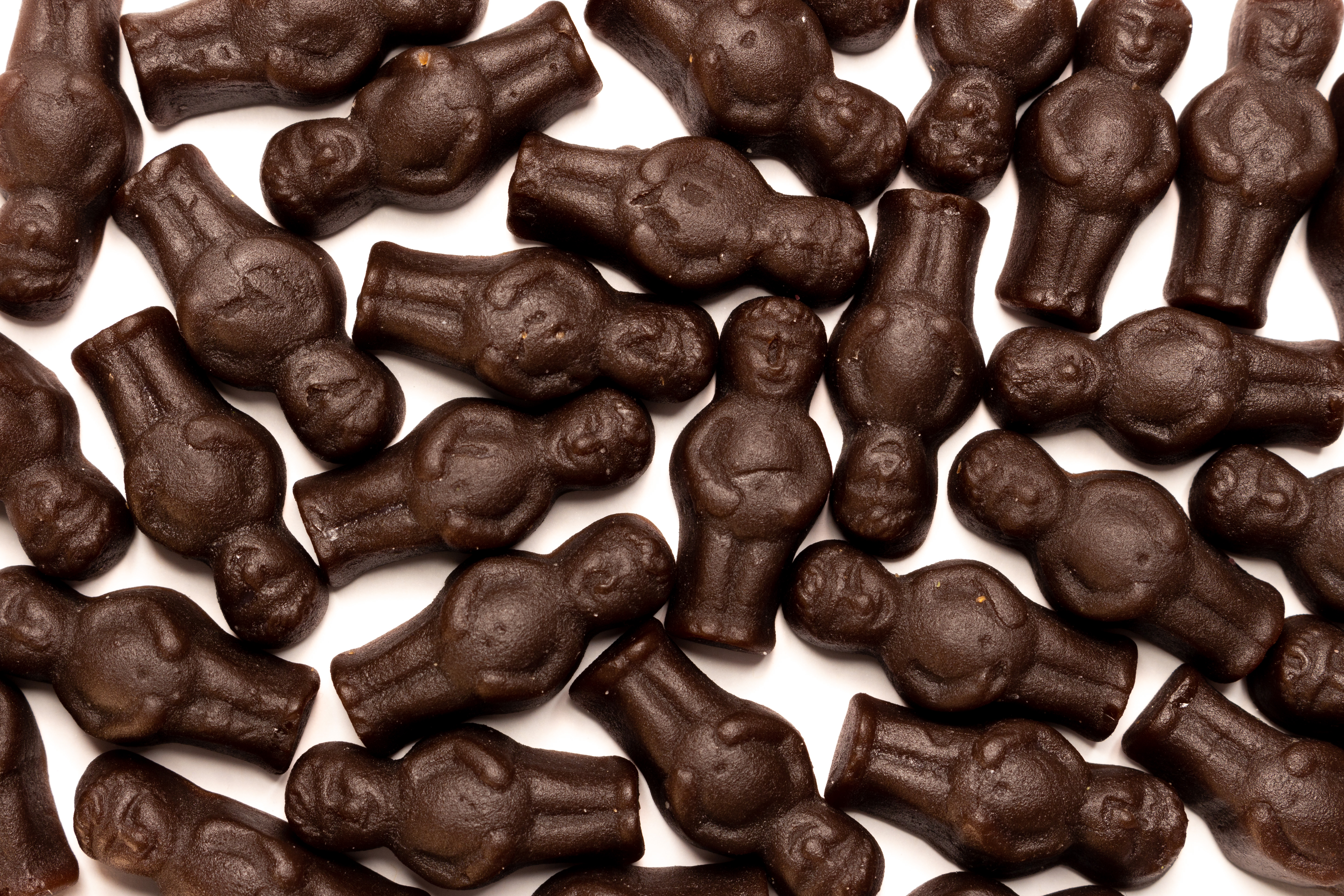
Cheekies

- Jaffas (Note: Originally invented by Sweetacres)
- Minties
- Sherbies
- Milko
- Red Ripperz
- Bananas
- Classic Party Mix
- Party Mix
- Retro Party Mix
- Chew Mix
- Fruits & Cream
- Jelly Beans
- Killer Pythons
- Kool Mints
- Kool Fruits
- Snakes Alive
- Frogs Alive
- Cheekies
- Strawberries & Cream
- Pineapples
- Freckles
- All About Red
- Jungle Stretchies
- Sea Stretchies
- Milk Bottles
- Ice Pops
- Sorbet Cones
- Ripe Raspberries
- Spearmint Leaves – (Note: Discontinued in 2015; reintroduced in 2020 and 2024)
- Black Cats
- Bites Mini Chocolate Raspberries
- Bites Mini White Choc Raspberries
- Bites Mini Chocolate Black Cat
- Bites Mini Chocolate Bananas
- Oak Flavoured Milk Bottles and Oak Iced Coffee Milk Bottles
- Sourz Snakes Alive
- Sourz Tangy Randoms
- Sourz Frogs Alive
- Sherbies Sour Fizz Chews

=== Former ===
- Fantales –
- Ace chewing gum
- Cobbers
- Bursting Bees
- Butter menthols
- Cure-em-quick (later Check-em-quick) (Note: Tiny hard black lollies with strong aniseed flavor, their name was changed for legal reasons)
- Irish Moss gum jubes
- Jelly Tots – First introduced in 1998, discontinued in 2004; temporarily reintroduced in 2015
- Q. T. fruit drops
- Steamrollers
- Tangy Tots
- Green Frogs – Discontinued in 2015 due to poor sales
- Kool Chocs – Discontinued in 2015
- Racing Cars
- Spearmint
- Oddfellows
- Marella Jubes – Discontinued in 2018 due to poor sales
- Grubs – Part of Allen's reduced sugar range
- Strawbs – Part of Allen's reduced sugar range
- Frog Family
- Peaches & Cream
- Drumstick
- Frosty Fruits
- Fruit Tingles manufacturing discontinued since 1985 due to rebranding by Nestlé's Wonka and Darrell Lea

== Adjustments to product lines ==
In October 2014, Allen's reduced the size of the 'Killer Python' product in order to reduce its portion size. It shrunk from 47 grams to 24 grams. The price of the snake was also adjusted accordingly.

In June 2015, the 'Spearmint Leaves' and 'Green Frogs' product lines were discontinued as they were not selling well, although 'Spearmint Leaves' were reintroduced in 2020 and 2024. A Nestlé spokesperson said that the 'Red Frogs' "outsell the green 10 to one".

In June 2023, Allen's announced that production of Fantales was to be discontinued due to declining sales.

Allen's Inside Outs were an innovative line of cube-shaped, peelable gummy lollies with hidden fruit-flavoured centers, but they faced an unexpected nationwide recall. The packets were pulled from shelves after a contract manufacturer experienced an equipment failure, leading to concerns that small pieces of plastic had been dislodged into the packets. Because of the safety risks and the immediate recall, the product was abruptly stripped from shelves nationwide.

== See also ==
- List of oldest companies in Australia
