= The Natural Confectionery Company =

Australian food company

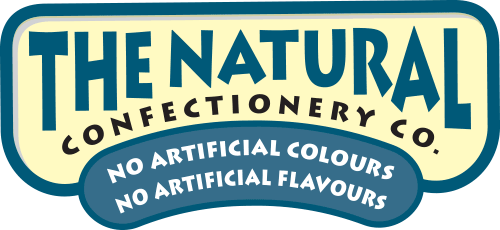
- Founded: 1949
- Parent: Mondelez International
- Website: tncc.com.au

The Natural Confectionery Co. is an Australian confectionery brand, owned by Mondelez International.

== History ==
Sunrise was founded by a young Julius Lighton and his son-in-law, Walter Eger. Initially, the two bought out Jupp & Sons, a small confectionery business in Abbotsford, Melbourne. Two years later, another of Julius Lighton's sons-in-law, Rudi Moser, joined him, and in 1949, they acquired a second small confectionery company, E. & H. Ihles, in another Melbourne suburb, Camberwell.

The official logo for Sunrise Confectioners

In 1951, these companies were merged into Sunrise. Three years later, after the phenomenal success of his confectionery companies, Sunrise purchased a larger factory in Greville Street, Prahran, Melbourne, to consolidate production.

Over the years, Sunrise Confectioners produced a multitude of confectionery including chocolate bullets, barley sugar, toasted marshmallows, hundreds & thousands, aniseed rings and more.

In the 1960s, Rudi Moser was joined by two of Walter Eger's sons, Michael and Andrew Eger. Over the next twenty years the trio strengthened the company, firmly establishing its place in the Australian market, and the overseas market, in particular England.

Rudi Moser's son-in-law, Ken Klooger, joined the company in 1987.

In 1991, the jelly production was relocated to larger premises at Notting Hill, in Melbourne's south-east.

In 1992, inspired by trends in the European market, Sunrise founded The Natural Confectionery Co. as an umbrella brand for their new line of products using no artificial colours and no artificial flavours. It began as a small range named Binka's, consisting of three products aimed at a niche market, but evolved in response to considerable demand. In June 1997, the emphasis shifted from Binka's to The Natural Confectionery Co. Due to successful advertising and marketing campaigns, increased distribution and a growing range of products, sales grew dramatically.

The official logo for Binka's

By 2003, The Natural Confectionery Co. product range consisted of 18 products, including sweet, sour and soft jubes. The Natural Confectionery Company's jellies had become the most popular jelly product on Australian supermarket shelves.

In April 2003 The Natural Confectionery Company was bought out by Cadbury Schweppes group of companies. The company also diversified into beverages, with "The Natural Beverage Company" branding.

In 2008 Cadbury Schweppes introduced products under "The Natural Confectionery Company" brand in the United Kingdom and used advertisements that gave the sweets voices and often surreal catchphrases such as "Bring on the trumpets!" voiced by British actors Matt Berry and Rupert Degas.

In 2019, the Melbourne Zoo removed all the Natural Confectionery Co. and Cadbury products from its shelves as they were unable to provide the source of the palm oil used in their products. Since the production of palm oil has ruined the natural habitat of several endangered species, Melbourne Zoo is stressing on committing to sustainable palm oil production.
