= Jaffas =

Confectionery from Allen's

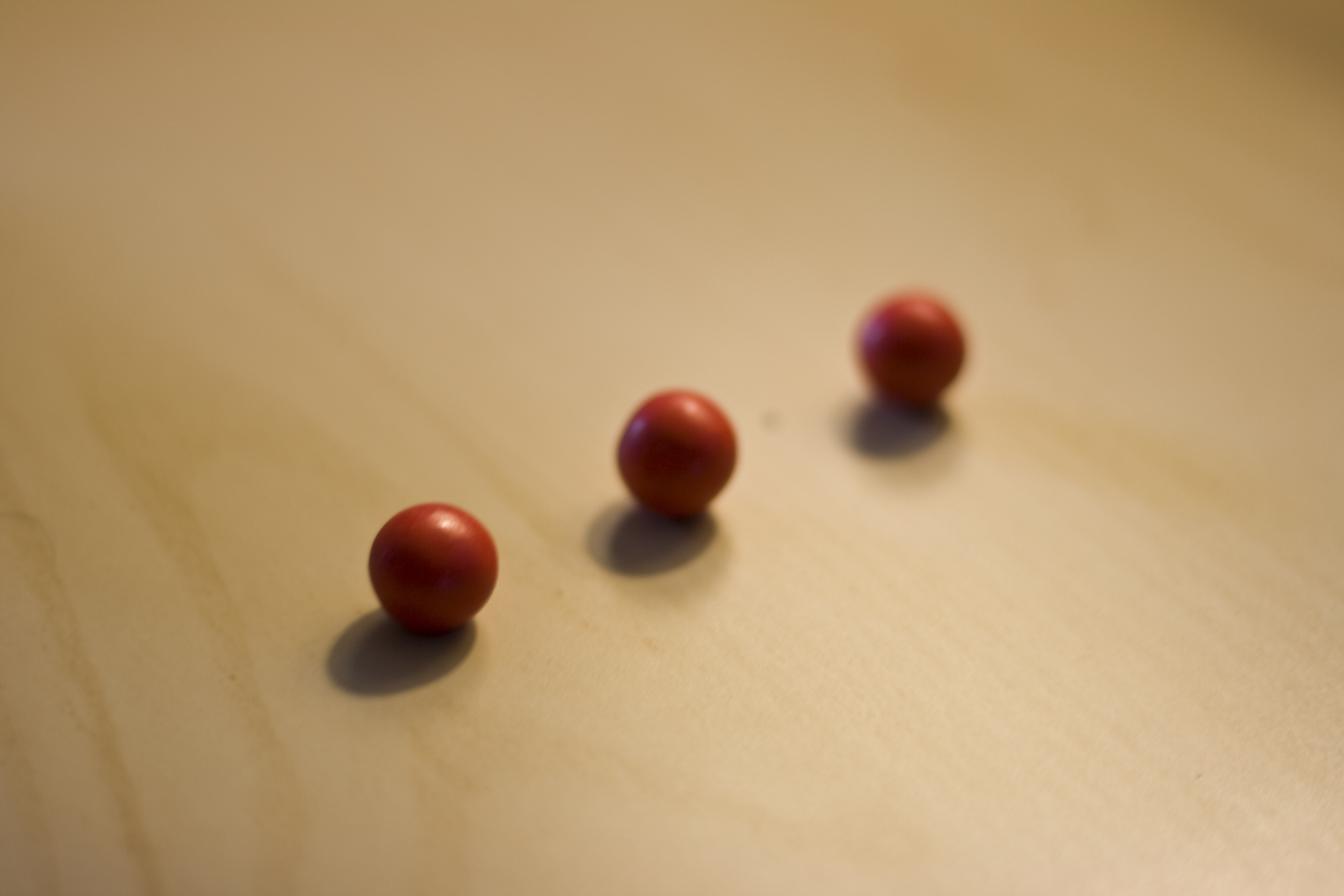
- Three pieces of Jaffas confectionery
- Type: Confectionery
- Main ingredients: Chocolate, orange flavouring

Jaffas is an Australian–New Zealand registered trademark for a small round confectionery consisting of a solid, orange-flavoured chocolate centre with a hard covering of a red confectionery shell. The name derives from the Jaffa orange. Jaffas are part of both Australiana and Kiwiana.

James Stedman-Henderson's Sweets Ltd., under their brand Sweetacres, released Jaffas onto the Australian and New Zealand markets in 1931. The confectionery is currently made in Australia by Allen's, a division of Nestlé. In New Zealand, it was made by RJ's Confectionery in Levin from 2018−2025, when production of the product was discontinued in that country.

A number of Australian and New Zealand amateur sporting groups use Jaffa as a team name. In Dunedin, New Zealand, every year a vast quantity of Jaffas is raced down Baldwin Street – the world's steepest residential street, according to the Guinness World Records – as part of the Cadbury Chocolate carnival, which is held in conjunction with the New Zealand International Science Festival. The initial number of 20,000 Jaffas has now been increased to 30,000 Jaffas. Similarly, "rolling Jaffas down the aisle" at the movie theatre is also a piece of Australian and New Zealand folklore, to the point that it was included in advertising in the 1970s.

The Australian supermarket business Coles has a generic version called "Choc Orange Balls"; similar products are made by other manufacturers.

In July 2025, RJ's announced it would discontinue production of Jaffas in New Zealand due to declining sales.

== See also ==
- Jaffa Cakes
- Terry's Chocolate Orange
