= Red Ripperz =

Raspberry-flavoured confectionery

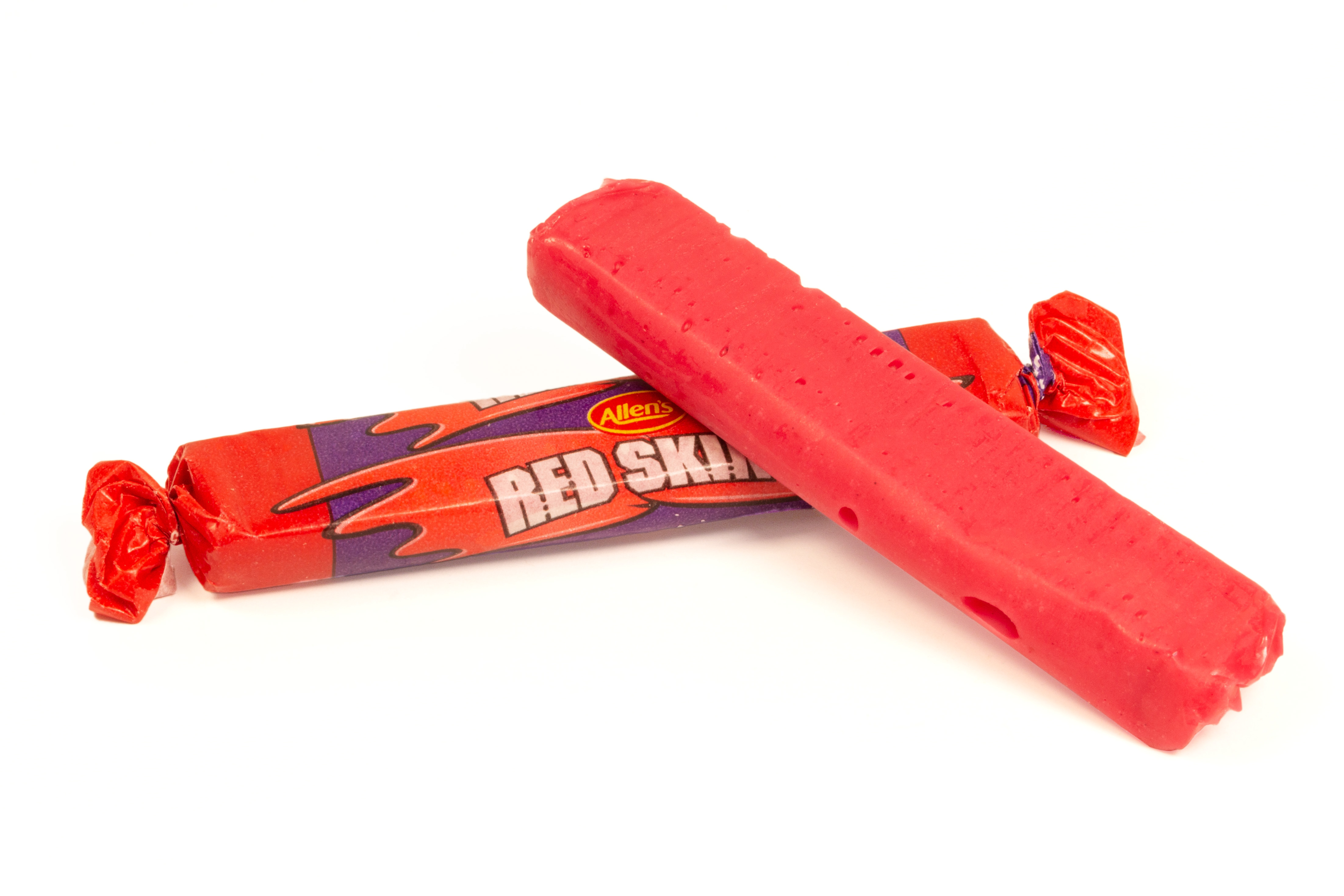
- Red Ripperz on top of the old wrapper with the original name "Red Skins"
- Type: Chewy confectionery
- Place of origin: Australia

Red Ripperz (formerly Redskins or Red Skins) are a red, raspberry-flavoured chewy confectionery manufactured in Australia by Nestlé under their Allen's brand.

The confectionery is sold as elongated bars which are individually twist-wrapped in paper, weighing approximately 10 grams each, although smaller sizes exist.

In June 2025, Allen's released apple and grape versions in a Ripperz Remix pack.

== Branding controversy ==
'Redskin' has been considered a racist term for Native Americans and First Nations Canadians since at least the 1800s.

In 1996, a complaint was made to the New Zealand Advertising Standards Complaints Board about a Redskins advertisement aired on New Zealand television. The advertisement featured comedian Mark Wright dressed in Native American clothing and assuming an accent. A mock drumbeat featured on the soundtrack. Despite protest from Nestlé New Zealand that the advertisement was inoffensive, the board upheld the complaint.

Red Skins packaging formerly featured a drawing of a Native American wearing a traditional headdress. This was replaced in the late 1990s by a more neutral red character.

In June 2020, along with Chicos, Nestlé announced that the name will be changed to "represent the inclusive nature of modern society". The company said the decision was made to ensure "nothing we do marginalises our friends, neighbours and colleagues". The statement added "these names have overtones which are out of step with Nestle's values, which are rooted in respect." The announcement of a name change occurred in the wake of widespread name changes following the George Floyd protests. On 16 November 2020, Nestlé announced that the new name for Red Skins would be Red Ripper. Packaging bearing the new name would be available in stores in early 2021. However, rebranding has been controversial as ‘Red Ripper’ was a name for Soviet serial killer Andrei Chikatilo. The product was eventually released with the name Red Ripperz.

== See also ==
- List of confectionery brands
