= Cheekies =

Chocolate-flavoured confectionery

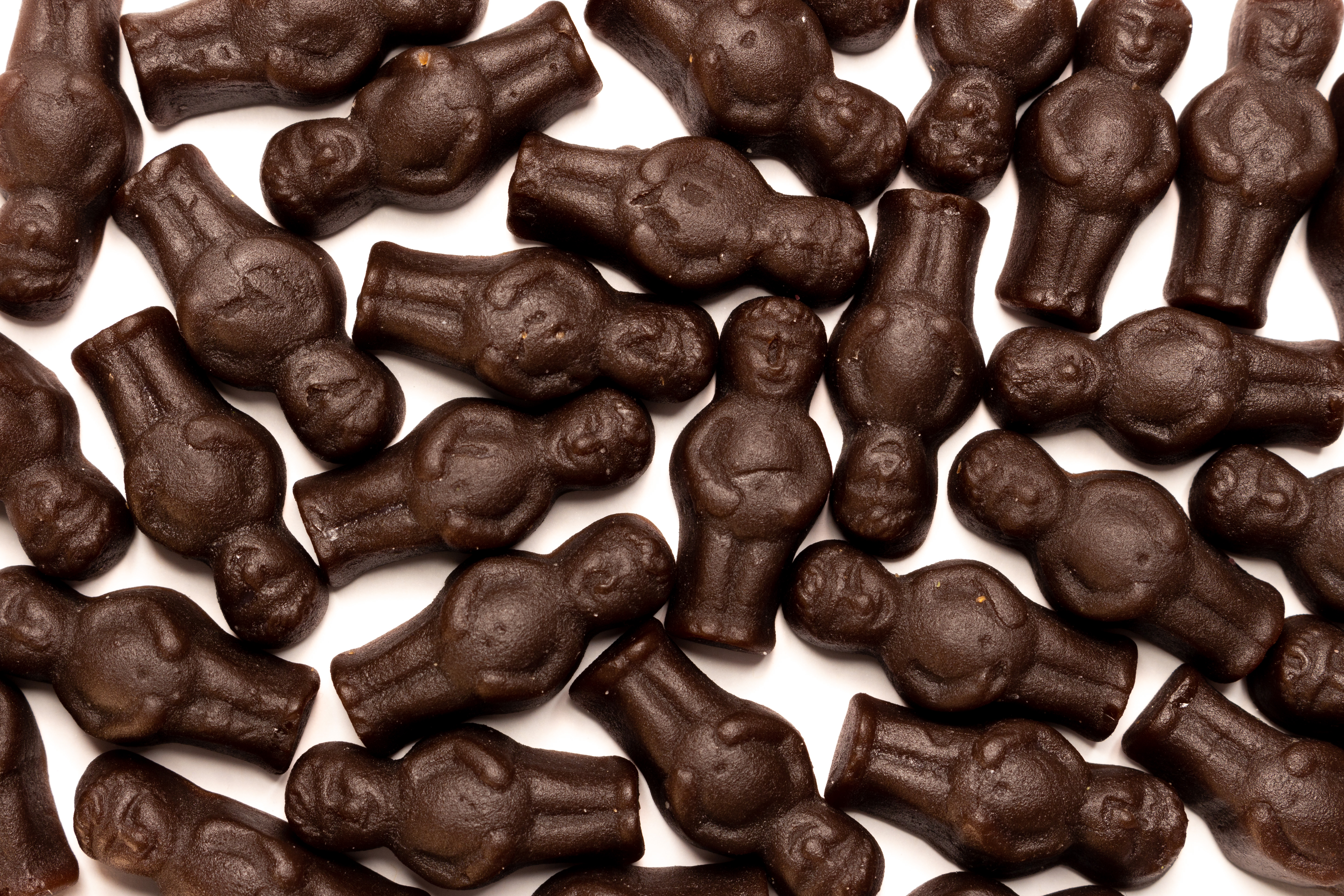
- Product type: Gummy candy
- Current owner: Nestlé
- Country: Australia
- Related brands: Allen's

Nutritional info
- Main ingredients: Glucose syrup, cane sugar, thickener, invert syrup, full cream milk powder, cocoa
- Food energy (per 20 g serving): 69.3 kcal (290 kJ)

Cheekies (formerly Chicos) is a brand of chocolate-flavoured jelly lolly produced by the Nestlé Corporation and sold in Australia.

The product previously contained gelatin but the ingredient was removed in 2015 to make Cheekies suitable for vegetarians. Cheekies are noted as a lolly that the public has a polarised opinion on.

In June 2020, along with Red Skins, Nestlé announced that the name would be changed to better align with modern values. The company said the decision was made to ensure "nothing we do marginalises our friends, neighbours and colleagues". The statement added "These names have overtones which are out of step with Nestle's values, which are rooted in respect." The word "chico" in Spanish translates as "boy". It can also be considered a derogatory term for people of Latin American descent, although this is not in common usage in Australia. The announcement of a name change occurred in the wake of widespread name changes following the George Floyd protests. On 16 November 2020, Nestlé announced that the new name for Chicos would be Cheekies. Packaging bearing the new name became available in stores in early 2021.
