= H. Leslie Quigg =

Police chief of Miami, Florida

Howard Leslie Quigg (1887 – 26 September 1980) was an American policeman who was twice the chief of police in Miami, Florida, in the periods 1921–1928 and 1937–1944.

Quigg was a member of the Ku Klux Klan.

In 1928, he and some of his officers were accused of the murder of a Black man in their custody. Quigg was indicted in 1928 after three Miami police officers beat Harry Kier, a Black bellboy, to death for allegedly insulting a white woman at the hotel where he worked. Although he was taken into custody in late March, the criminal charges were dismissed by May because the witness did not testify.

He was succeeded as police chief by Guy C. Reeve in 1928, and by Charles O. Nelson in 1944.

Quigg died of a stroke in 1980, at the age of 92.
