= Darrell Lea =

Australian chocolate and liquorice company

- Industry: Chocolate; Confectionery; Food and drink
- Founded: 1927
- Founder: Harry Lea
- Headquarters: Sydney, Australia
- Key people: Darrell Bernard Lea
- Products: Chocolate, liquorice and other confectionery
- Owner: Quadrant Private Equity
- Number of employees: 200 (2018)
- Website: www.dlea.com.au

Darrell Lea is an Australian company that manufactures and distributes chocolate, liquorice and other confectionery. Its headquarters is based in the Sydney suburb of Ingleburn. After 85 years under the ownership and control of the Lea family, the company went into voluntary administration in 2012 leading to its acquisition, sale and restructuring under new ownership.

== History ==
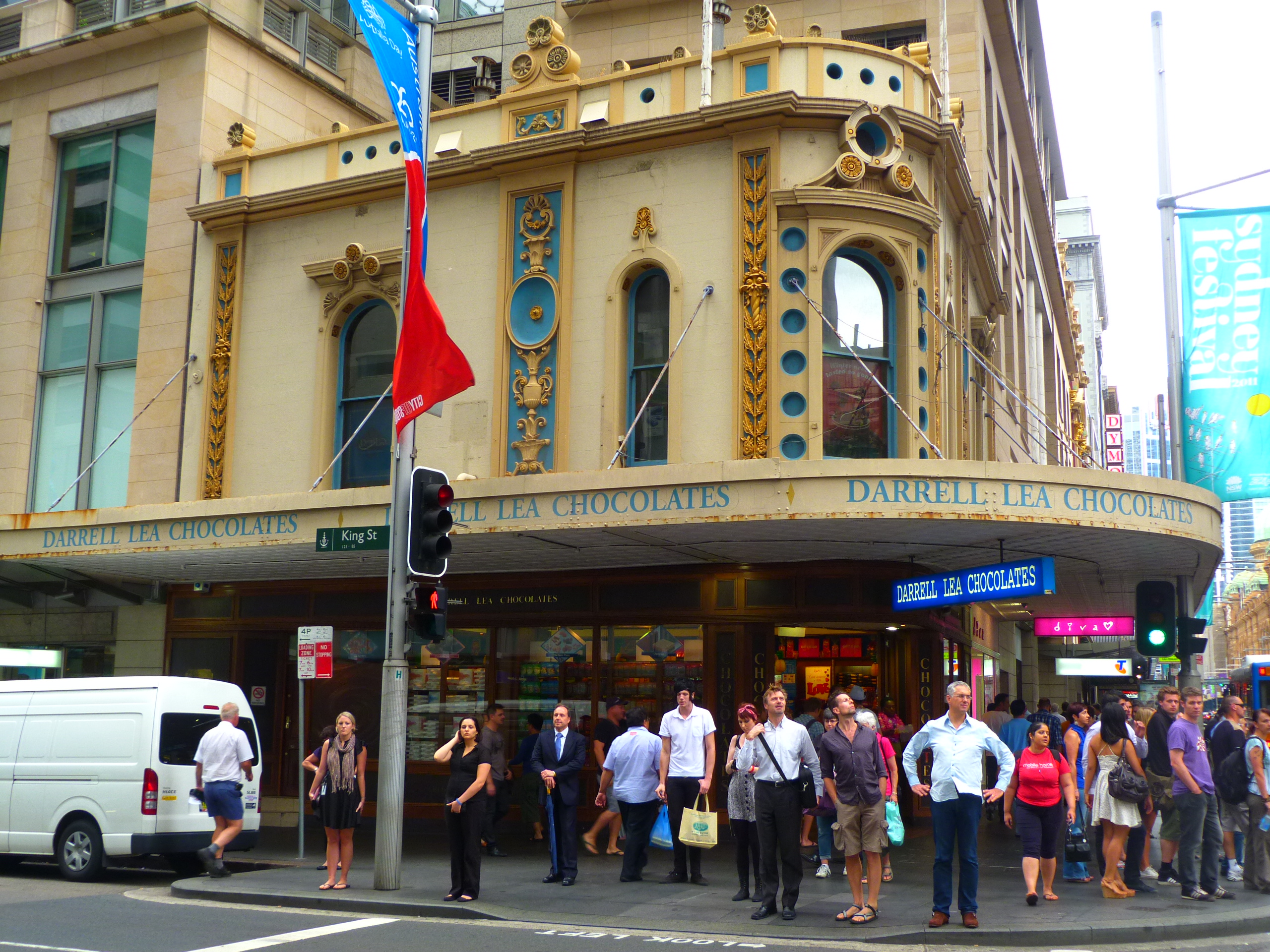
Darrell Lea store at the corner of King and George streets Sydney

Darrell Lea was in the ownership of the Lea family from its foundation by Harry Lea until the early 2010s. Harry, who was born on 15 February 1876 in Spitalfields, London, migrated to Western Australia in 1888 and started making confectionery in 1917 at the back of his Manly Corso fruit shop. Lea started the first shop in New South Wales in 1927 in Sydney's Haymarket, being a combined milk bar and confectionery shop. During the Great Depression in 1929, a shop became vacant in Pitt Street, and in 1935 a factory was established at 1 York Street. His first almond nougat creation was called Bulgarian Rock.

Monty (Montague) and Harris Lea, the two middle sons of Harry, opened a manufacturing operation in Melbourne, with their first shop on Swanston Street, in 1940.

Harry Lea died in 1957. Maurice Lea, Harry's eldest son, opened five shops in Brisbane in 1966 and delivered fresh stock until he (Maurice) retired in 1996. Robert Lea, Harris' second son, opened a shop in Adelaide in 1966.

In 1968, the company was listed on the stock exchange, with Darrell (c. 1927-1992) as chairman and managing director (Harris became managing director in 1971), but was privatised again in 1982, with Jason Durard Lea (28 September 1942 – 12 September 2005), Monty's son, being managing director from 1983 to 1998. Darrell died in 1990, aged 62. In 1992, the Darrell Lea chocolate factory at Kogarah was rebuilt with modern machinery after a fire in the previous year.

=== Voluntary administration ===
On 10 July 2012, Darrell Lea was placed into voluntary administration due to a review of the business by its directors who had concerns about Darrell Lea's ability to meet its ongoing financial obligations. The company was reported to be losing $200,000 a week, and half of its company-run stores were closed immediately, with the loss of nearly 200 jobs.

=== Acquisition ===
On 3 September 2012, the company was acquired by the Queensland owners of VIP Petfoods, the Quinn family. The business was further restructured, with the loss of 172 casual and 246 permanent jobs, leaving only 83 Darrell Lea employees. The last company-owned stores were closed by end of business on 9 September 2012. The Quinns turned the business around after injecting about $30 million into it and building a second factory in Ingleburn. More than 500 products were cut from the product line which halved annual revenue, but stopped the ongoing losses. Darrell Lea products continued to be sold through its licensed retailer network which was expanded into IGA, Coles and Woolworths.

In January 2018, Quadrant Private Equity purchased Darrell Lea from the Quinn family for about $200 million. Tony and Christina Quinn retained a significant stake in the company.

== Products ==
Prior to 2012, Darrell Lea's range comprised over 800 products, including chocolate boxes, sugar free products and fundraising items with 60 extra items created seasonally for Easter and Christmas. It is particularly famous for its iconic "Rocklea Road" recipe, Australia's most famous version of Rocky Road chocolate. In the review conducted by the Quinn family after the restructure, the company eliminated or put on hold many of the lesser-known products to concentrate on expanding the sales and distribution of its more profitable products. A major product line for Darrell Lea are chocolate bullets, with the company making over one billion individual bullets per year both for domestic and export markets as at 2023.

== Legal battle ==
In April 2008, Darrell Lea won a five-year legal battle brought by rival chocolate company Cadbury over Darrell Lea's use of the colour purple on its packaging (which Cadbury uses for its Dairy Milk range packaging), when the Australian judge ruled that Darrell Lea was not trying to mislead customers by adopting the similar coloured branding.

== Community involvement ==
Darrell Lea has sponsored a local high school in order to assist students in continuing their studies to completion, and has supported The Lorna Hodgkinson Sunshine Home which employs people with severe intellectual disability. Additionally, the company helps organisations such as the Starlight Foundation, Variety Club, and other local youth groups.
