= Catmint =

Catmint usually refers to:

- the genus Anisomeles
- the garden plant Nepeta × faassenii

It may also refer to

- Anisomeles indica
- Anisomeles malabarica, Malabar catmint
- the plant genus Nepeta
  - Nepeta cataria, catnip
  - Nepeta nepetella, lesser catmint

== See also ==
- Catnip (disambiguation)
