= Rhizome =

Underground stem in which various plants asexually reproduce via budding

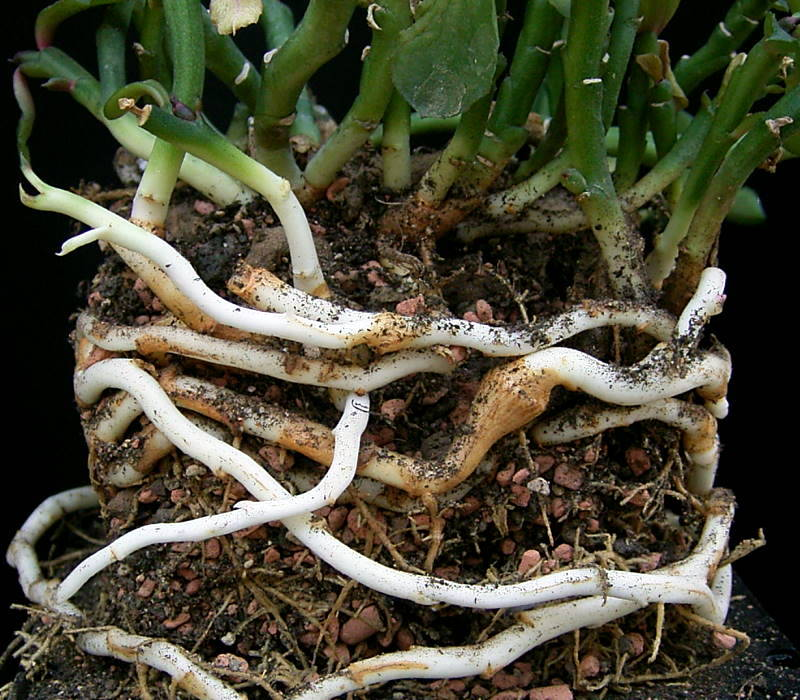
An antique spurge plant, Euphorbia antiquorum, sending out white rhizomes

In botany and dendrology, a rhizome (/ˈraɪzoʊm/ RY-zohm) (Note: from Ancient Greek ῥίζωμα (rhízōma) 'mass of roots', from ῥιζόω (rhizóō) 'cause to strike root') is a modified subterranean plant stem that sends out roots and shoots from its nodes. Rhizomes are also called creeping rootstalks or just rootstalks. Rhizomes develop from axillary buds and grow horizontally. The rhizome also retains the ability to allow new shoots to grow upwards.

A rhizome is the main stem of the plant that runs typically underground and horizontally to the soil surface. Rhizomes have nodes and internodes and auxiliary buds. Roots do not have nodes and internodes and have a root cap terminating their ends. In general, rhizomes have short internodes, send out roots from the bottom of the nodes, and generate new upward-growing shoots from the top of the nodes. A stolon is similar to a rhizome, but stolon sprouts from an existing stem having long internodes and generating new shoots at the ends. Stolons are often called runners, such as in the strawberry plant.

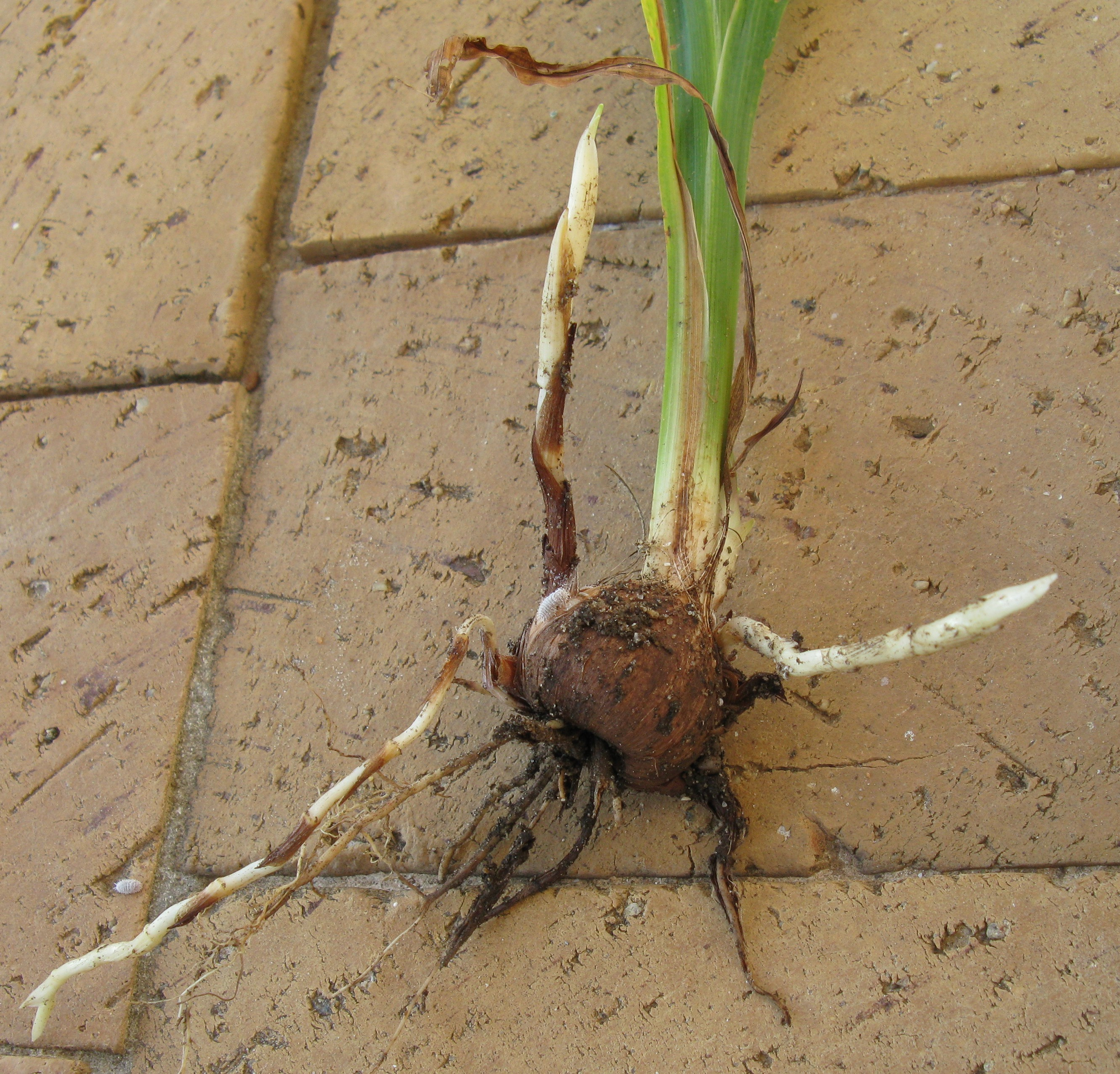
Stolons growing from nodes from a corm of Crocosmia

A stem tuber is a thickened part of a rhizome or stolon that has been enlarged for use as a storage organ. In general, a tuber is high in starch, e.g. the potato, which is a modified stolon. The term "tuber" is often used imprecisely and is sometimes applied to plants with rhizomes.

The plant uses the rhizome to store starches, proteins, and other nutrients. These nutrients become useful for the plant when new shoots must be formed or when the plant goes into low activity for the winter. If a rhizome is separated, each piece may be able to give rise to a new plant. This is a process known as vegetative reproduction and is used by farmers and gardeners to propagate certain plants. This also allows for lateral spread of grasses like bamboo and bunch grasses. Examples of plants that are propagated this way include hops, asparagus, ginger, irises, lily of the valley, cannas, and sympodial orchids.

Stored rhizomes are subject to bacterial and fungal infections, making them unsuitable for replanting and greatly diminishing stocks. However, rhizomes can also be produced artificially from tissue cultures. The ability to easily grow rhizomes from tissue cultures leads to better stocks for replanting and greater yields. The plant hormones ethylene and jasmonic acid have been found to help induce and regulate the growth of rhizomes, specifically in rhubarb. Ethylene that was applied externally was found to affect internal ethylene levels, allowing easy manipulations of ethylene concentrations. Knowledge of how to use these hormones to induce rhizome growth could help farmers and biologists to produce plants grown from rhizomes, and more easily cultivate and grow better plants.

Some plants have rhizomes that grow above ground or that lie at the soil surface, including some Iris species as well as ferns, whose spreading stems are rhizomes. Plants with underground rhizomes include gingers, bamboo, snake plant, the Venus flytrap, Chinese lantern, western poison-oak, hops, and Alstroemeria, and some grasses, such as Johnson grass, Bermuda grass, and purple nut sedge. Rhizomes generally form a single layer, but in giant horsetails, can be multi-tiered.

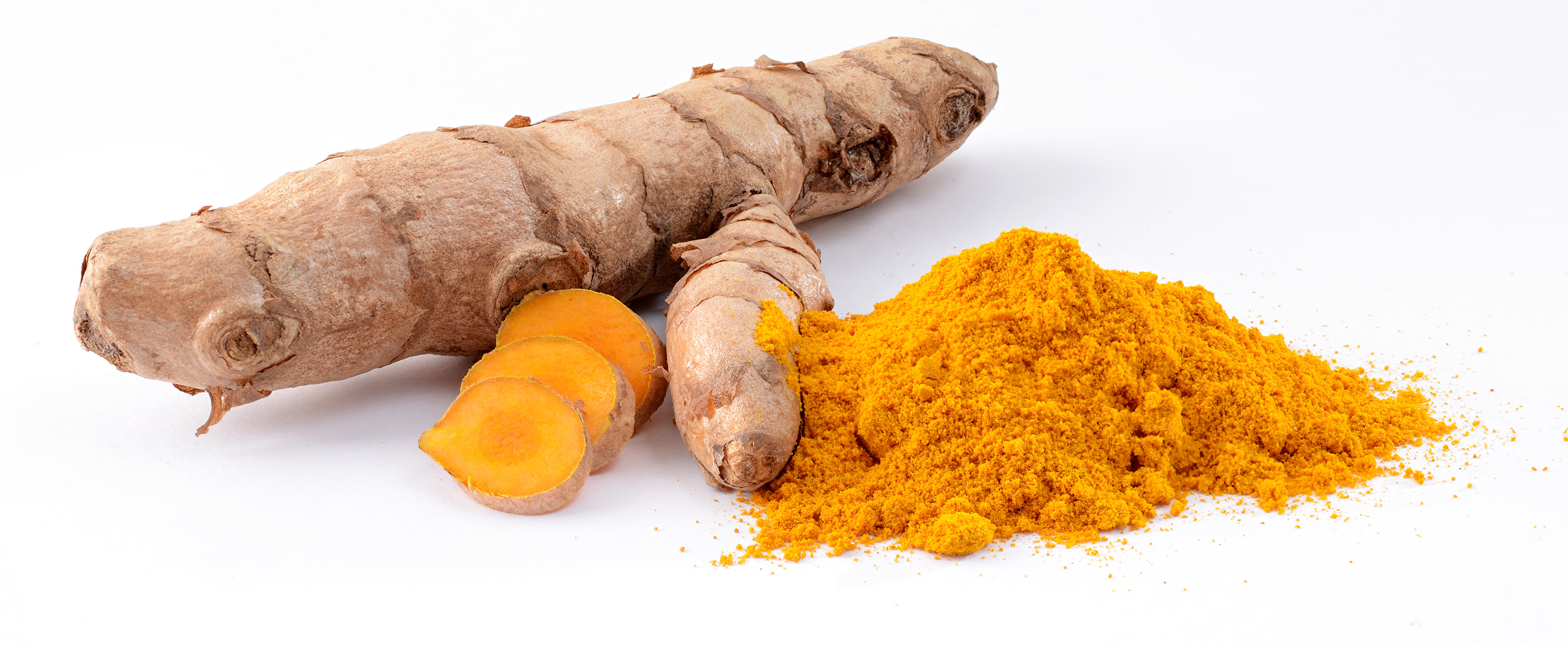
Turmeric rhizome, whole and ground into a spice

Many rhizomes have culinary value, and some, such as zhe'ergen, are commonly consumed raw. Some rhizomes that are used directly in cooking include ginger, turmeric, galangal, fingerroot, lotus and wasabi.

== See also ==
- Aspen
- Bulb
- Mycorrhiza
