= Neigembos =

Forrst in Ninove, Belgium

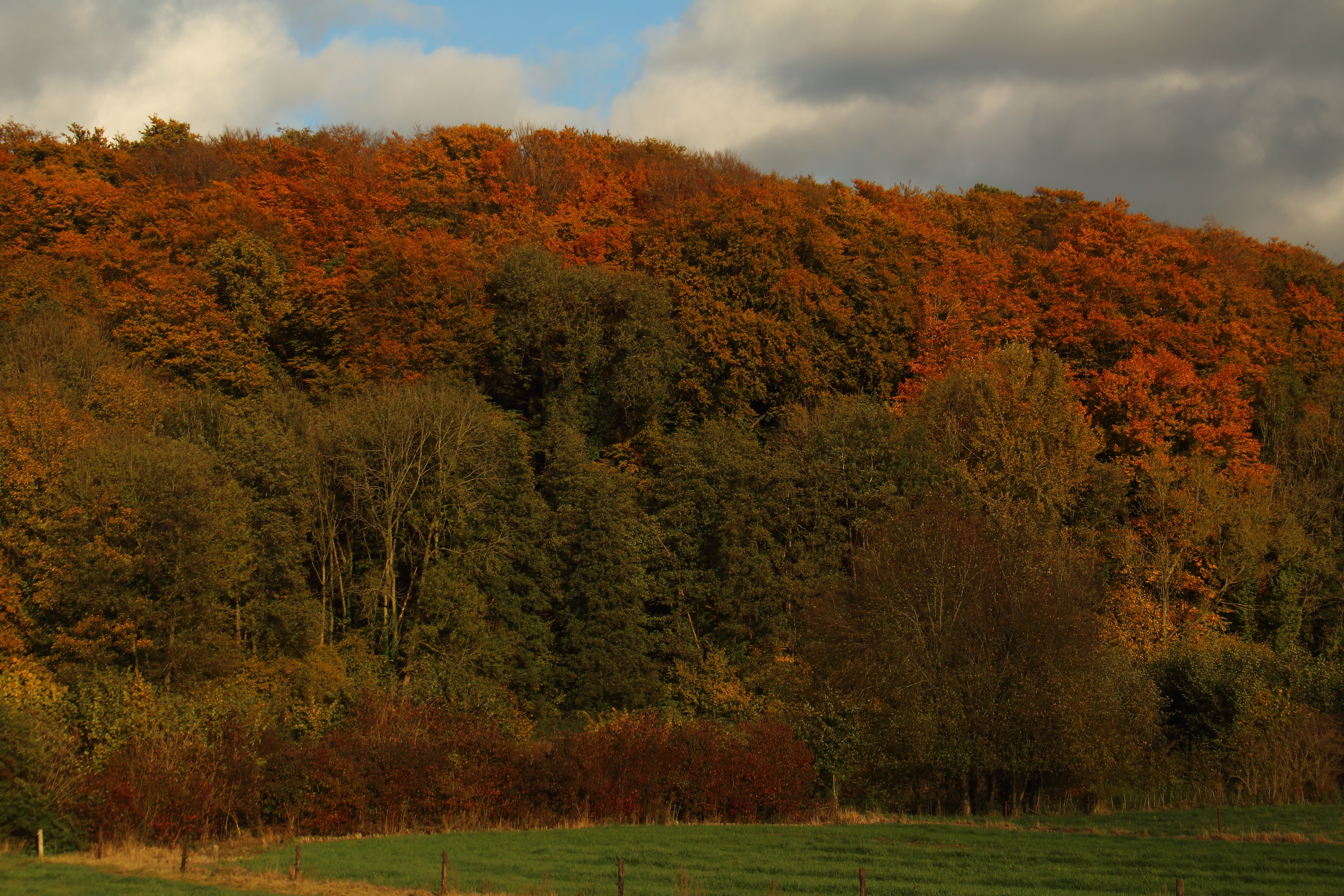

- Type: Forest
- Location: Meerbeke (Ninove)
- Nearest city: Ninove
- Coordinates: 50°48′41.8″N 4°3′52.6″E
- Area: 72 hectares (180 acres)
- Owner: Agentschap Natuur en Bos, Natuurpunt
- Status: open to the public

The Neigembos is a 72-hectare nature and forest area in Meerbeke (Ninove) that is protected in Europe as part of the Natura 2000 Habitats Directive area 'Forests of the Flemish Ardennes and other South Flemish forests'. It is, just like the Sonian Forest, a remnant of the old Coal Forest. The forest covers a height difference of 20 to 90m above sea level on the border between the Flemish Ardennes and the Pajottenland. Most of the Neigembos forest is a forest reserve.

== Flora ==
The Neigembos has a tree stock of mainly beech and to a lesser extent oak and ash. On the more acidic soils, Pteridium aquilinum, lily of the valley grows. Hyacinthoides non-scripta, Allium ursinum, Anemonoides nemorosa and Lamium galeobdolon grow on the loamy soils in spring. In the western part of the forest (Vriezenbos) grows black alder, ash, marsh marigold, giant horsetail, Cardamine amara, Chrysosplenium oppositifolium and Chrysosplenium alternifolium.

== Fauna ==
The forest is home to the common buzzards, kingfishers, lesser spotted woodpecker, roe deer, brown long-eared bat, nuthatch, marsh tit, common frog, slow worm, common toad, Anthocharis cardamines, spotted sandpiper, Gonepteryx rhamni.

== Mushrooms ==
The Neigembos is also a hotspot for mushrooms, more than 500 species have already been found. Including; Artomyces pyxidatus, Suillellus luridus, Caloboletus radicans, Exidia recisa, Lycoperdon echinatum, Hygrocybe cantharellus, Hygrophorus eburneus, Mycena crocata, Mycena meliigena, and many other rare and non-rare species.

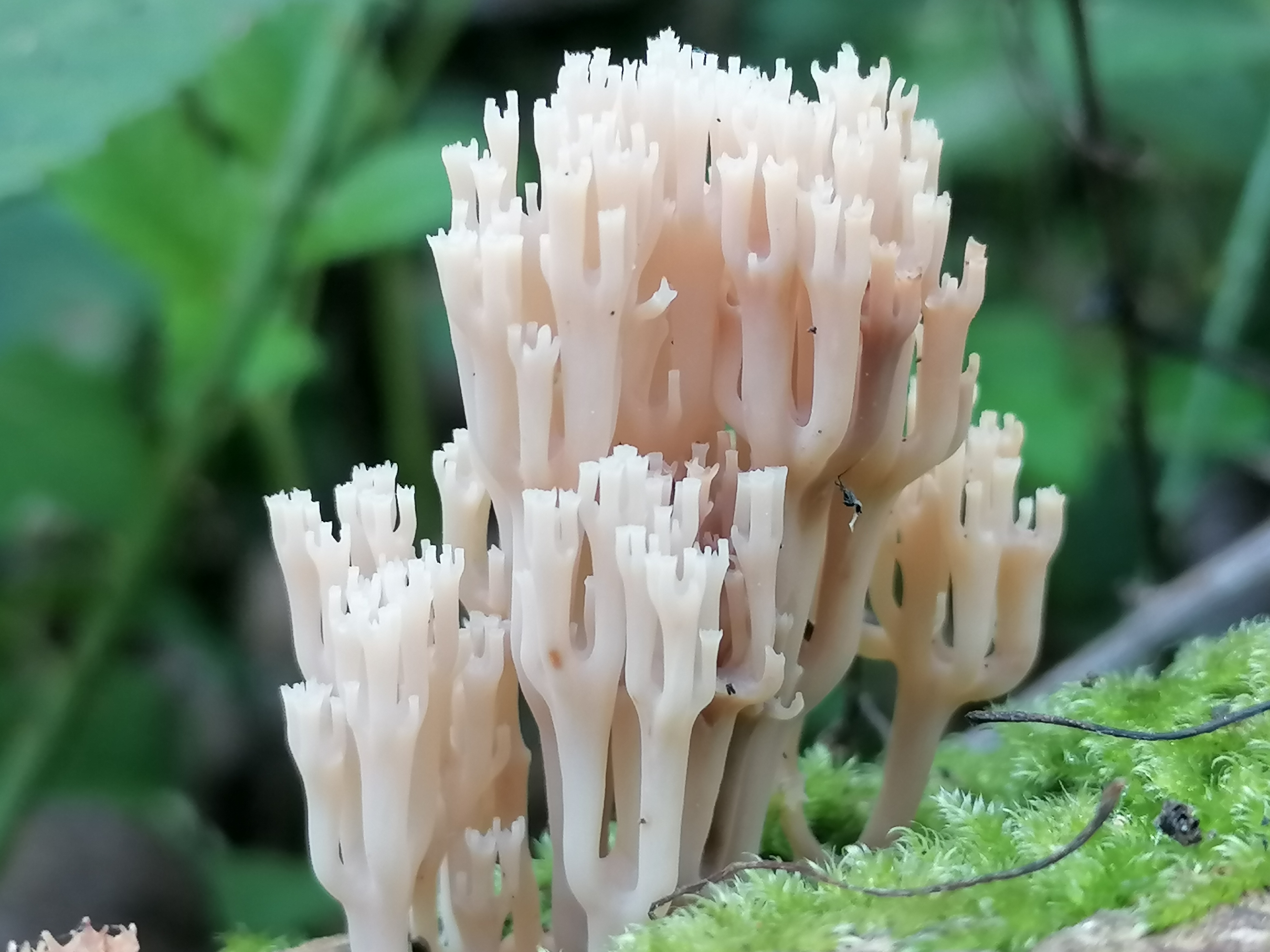
Mycena meliigena

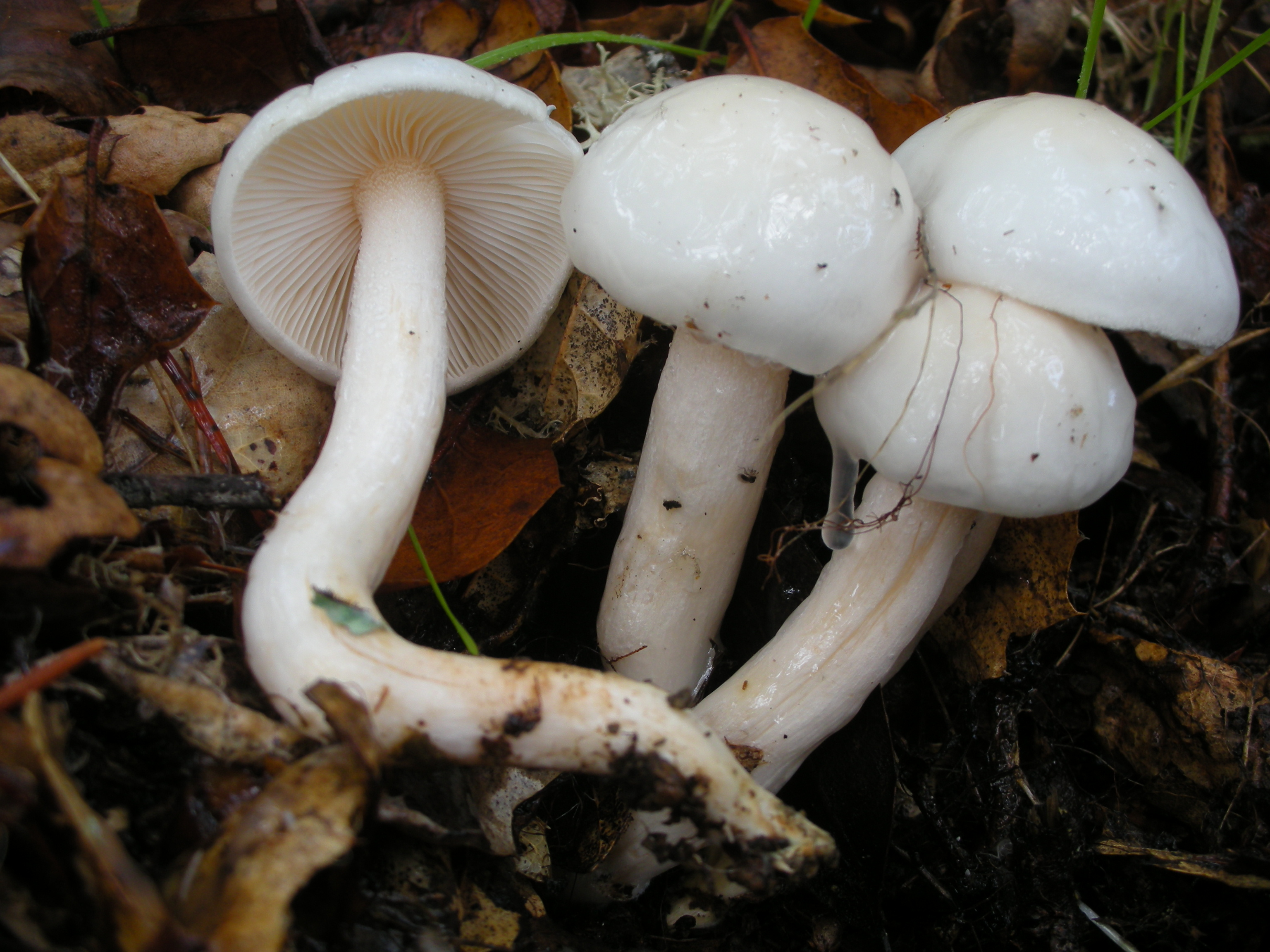
Hygrophorus eburneus

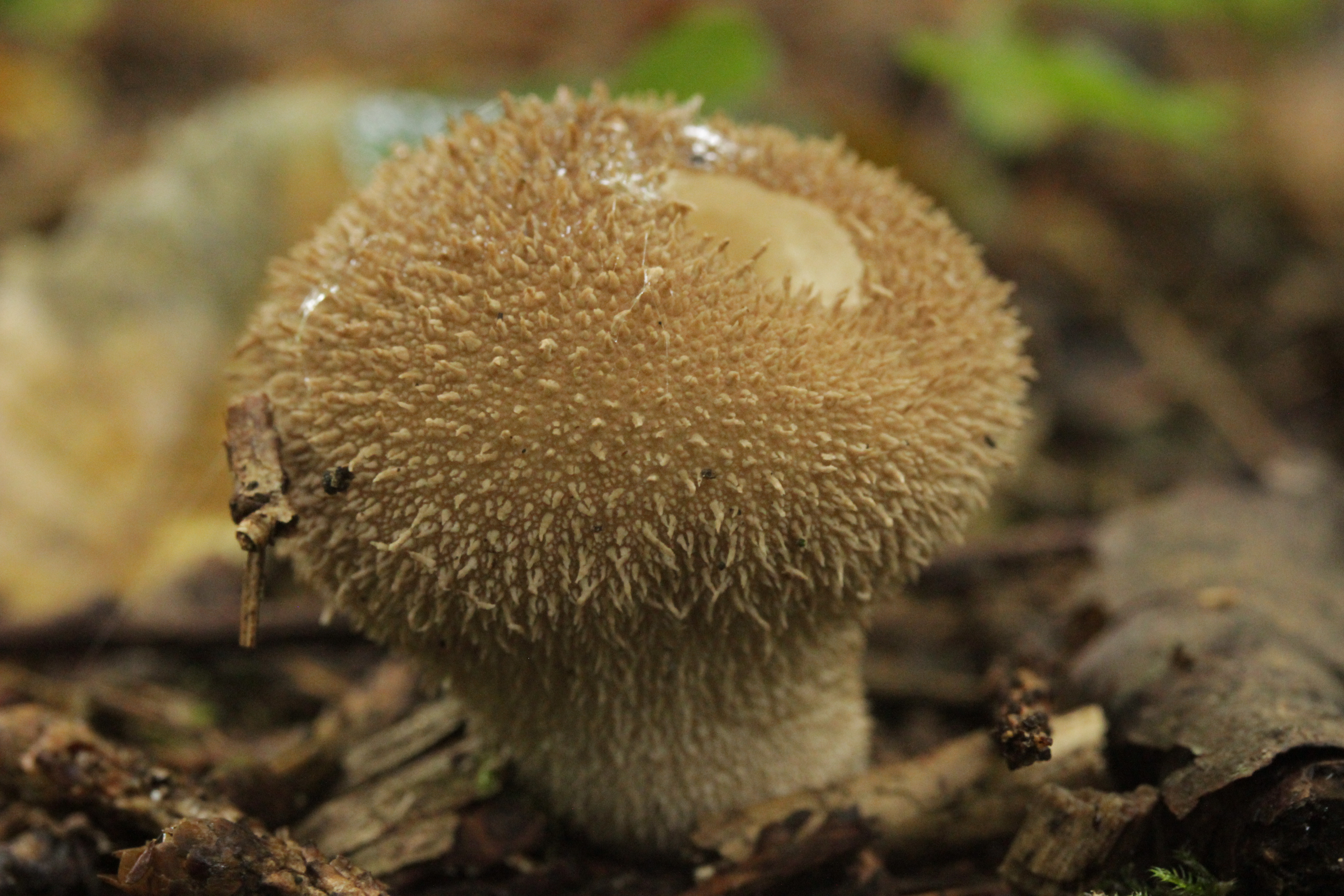
Lycoperdon echinatum

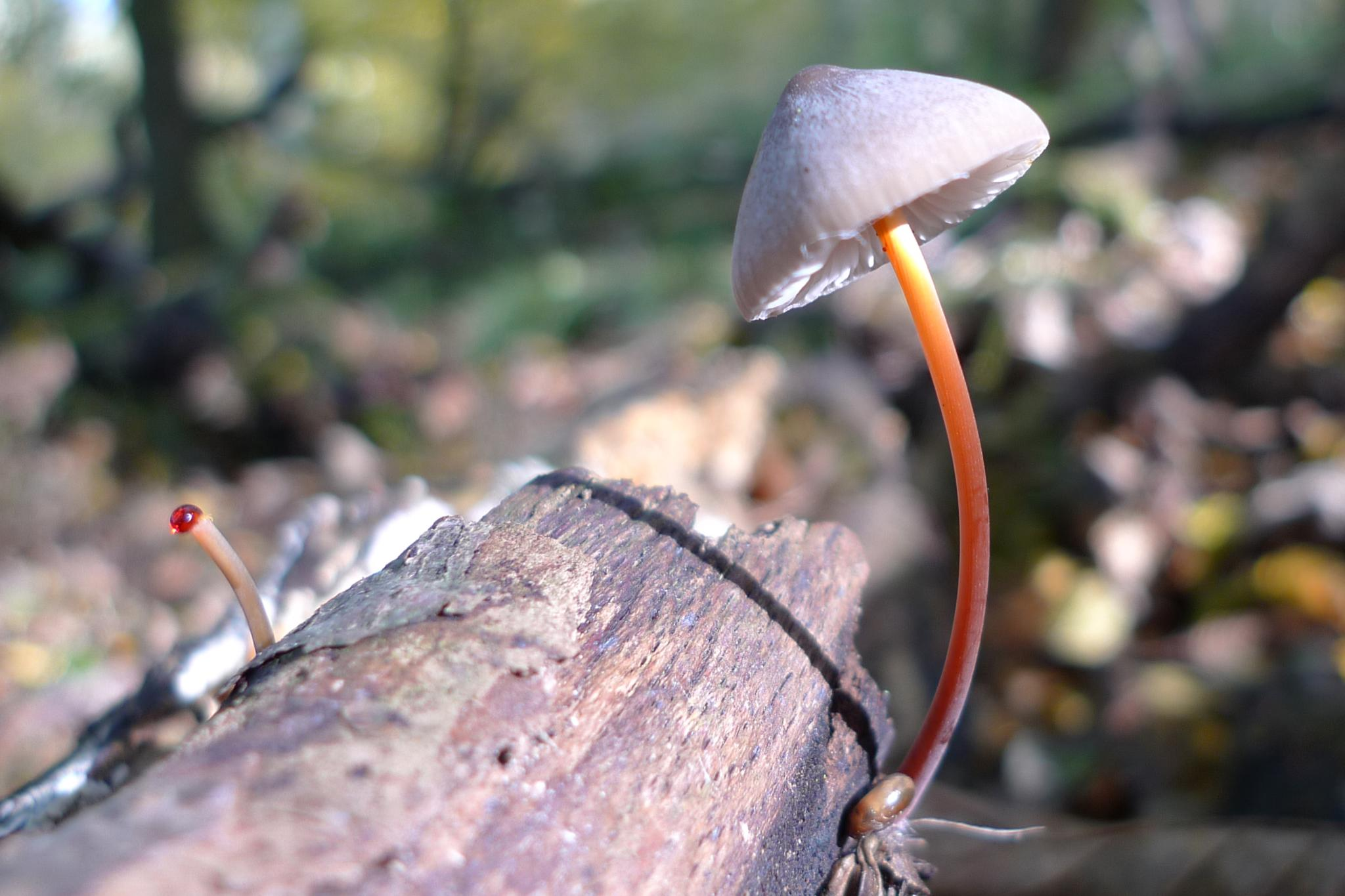
Mycena crocata.

== Groebe ==
There are 4 erosion channels in the Neigembos. The erosion channels were created because the climate warmed up 12000 years ago. This released a lot of meltwater, which scoured erosion channels in the steep heaving channels. Another name for groebe is smeltdal. In the past, the erosion channels were used as footpaths. In one of the groebes, a 220-metre-long corduroy road has been constructed to bridge a height difference of 24 metres.

Today, the erosion trenches form unique biotopes, with rare plants.

== Nature experience ==
The GR trail 512 passes through the Neigembos, as well as the hiking network 'Vlaamse Ardennen - Bronbossen'/'Scheldeland' and three signposted walks ('Dikke Beuken' (1.5 km), 'Bevingen' (2.2 km), 'De Groeben' (3.7 km)).

== Images ==
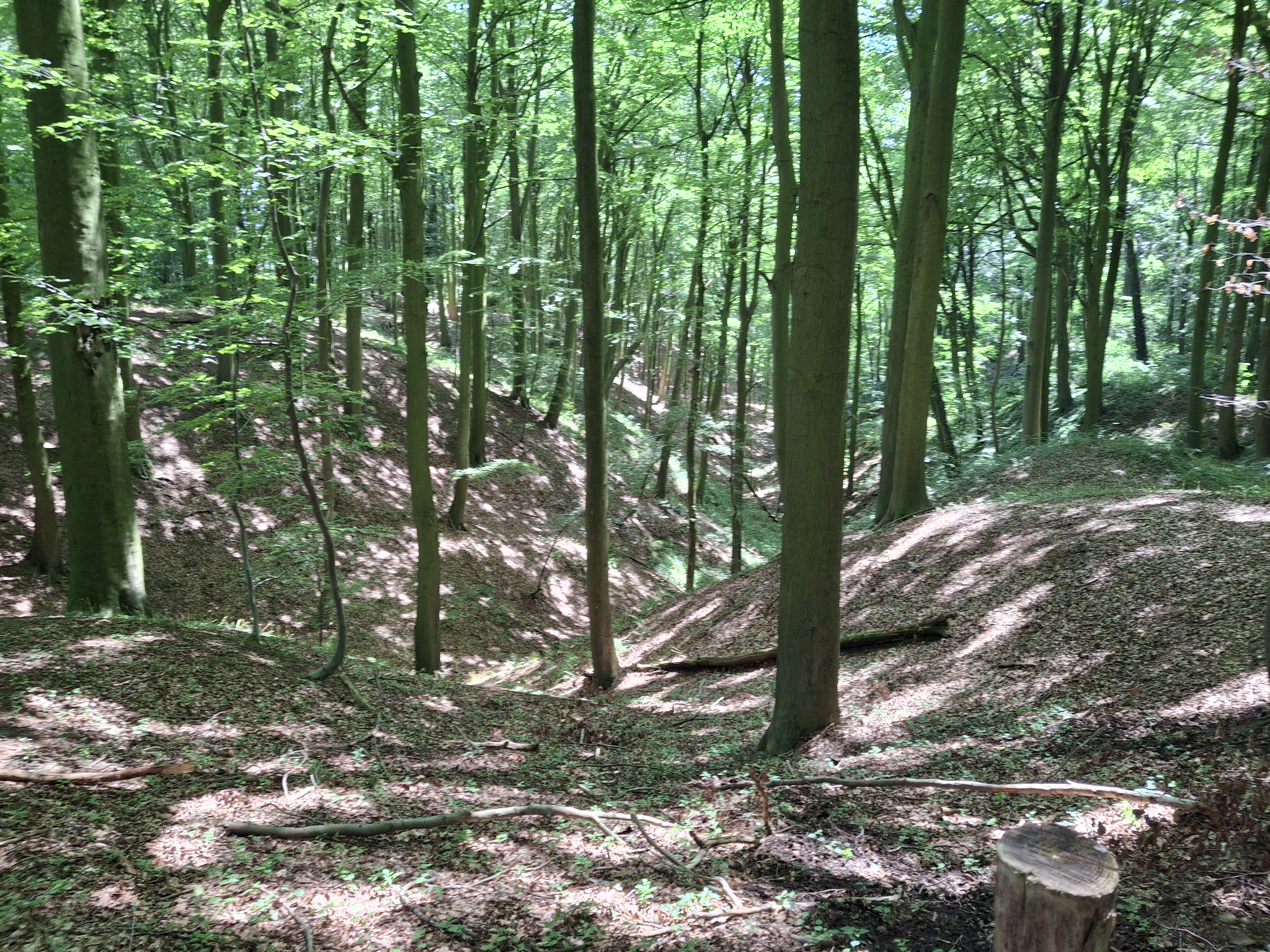
Erosian channels in Neigembos

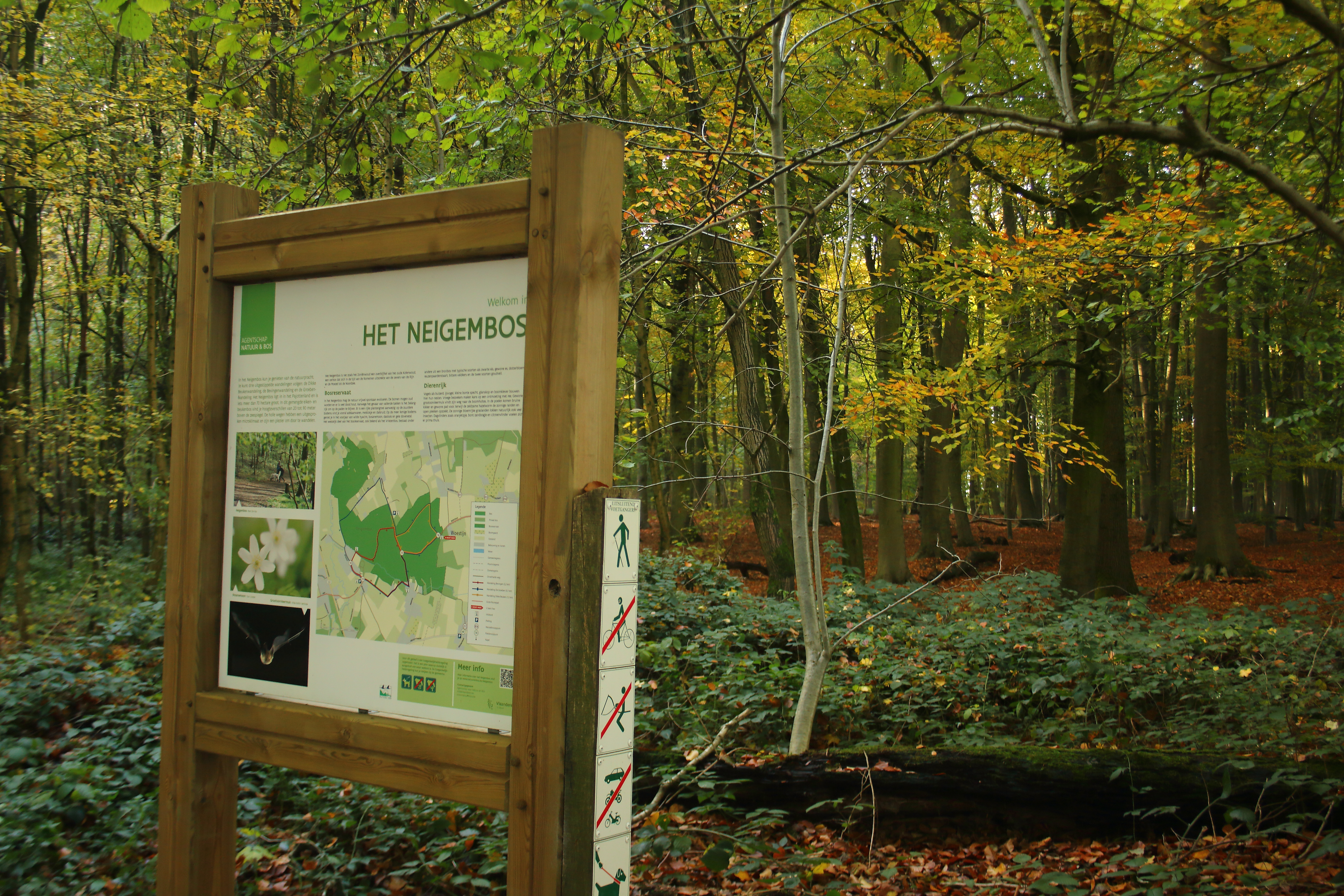
Information board

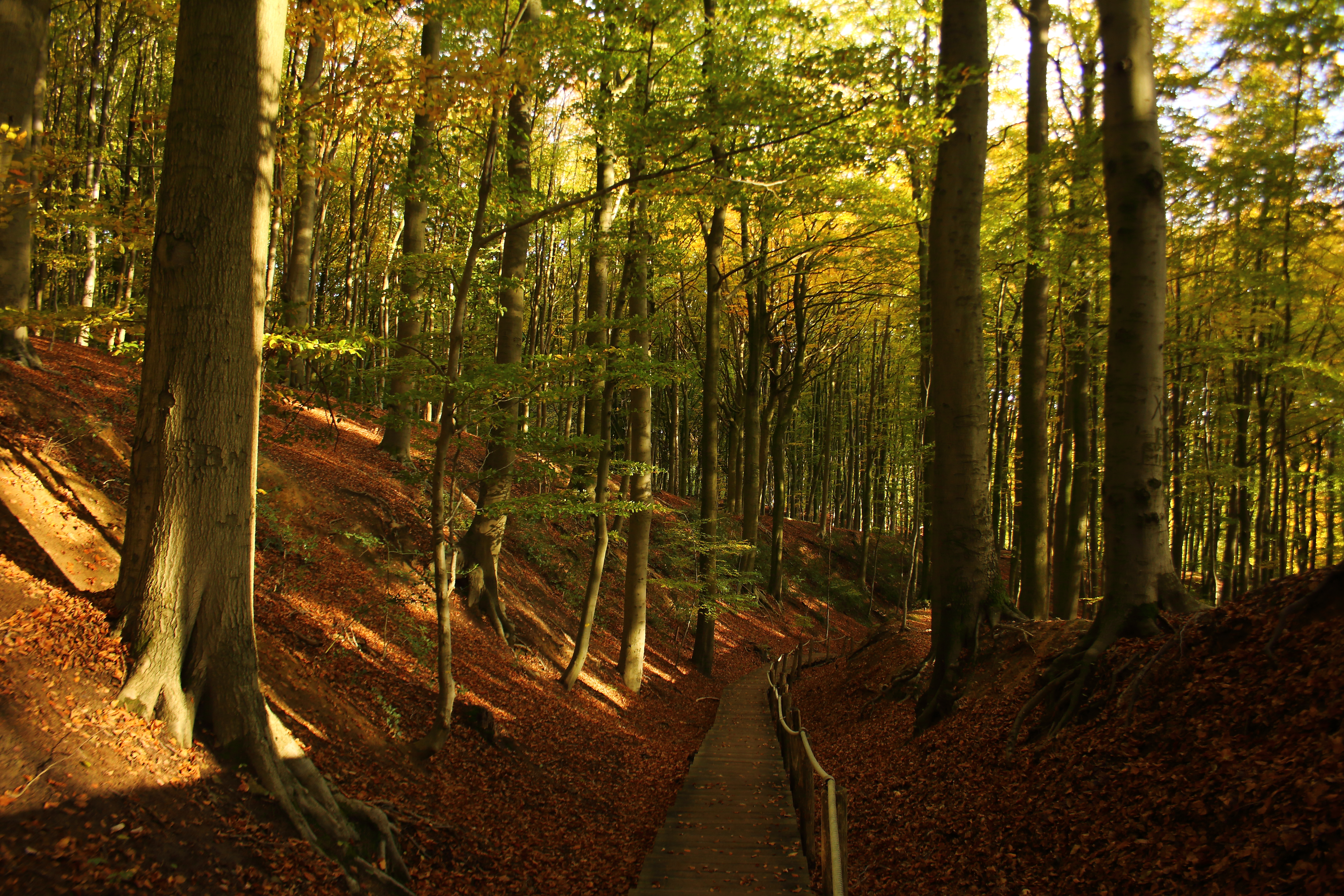
Corduroy road in one of the erosion channels in Neigembos

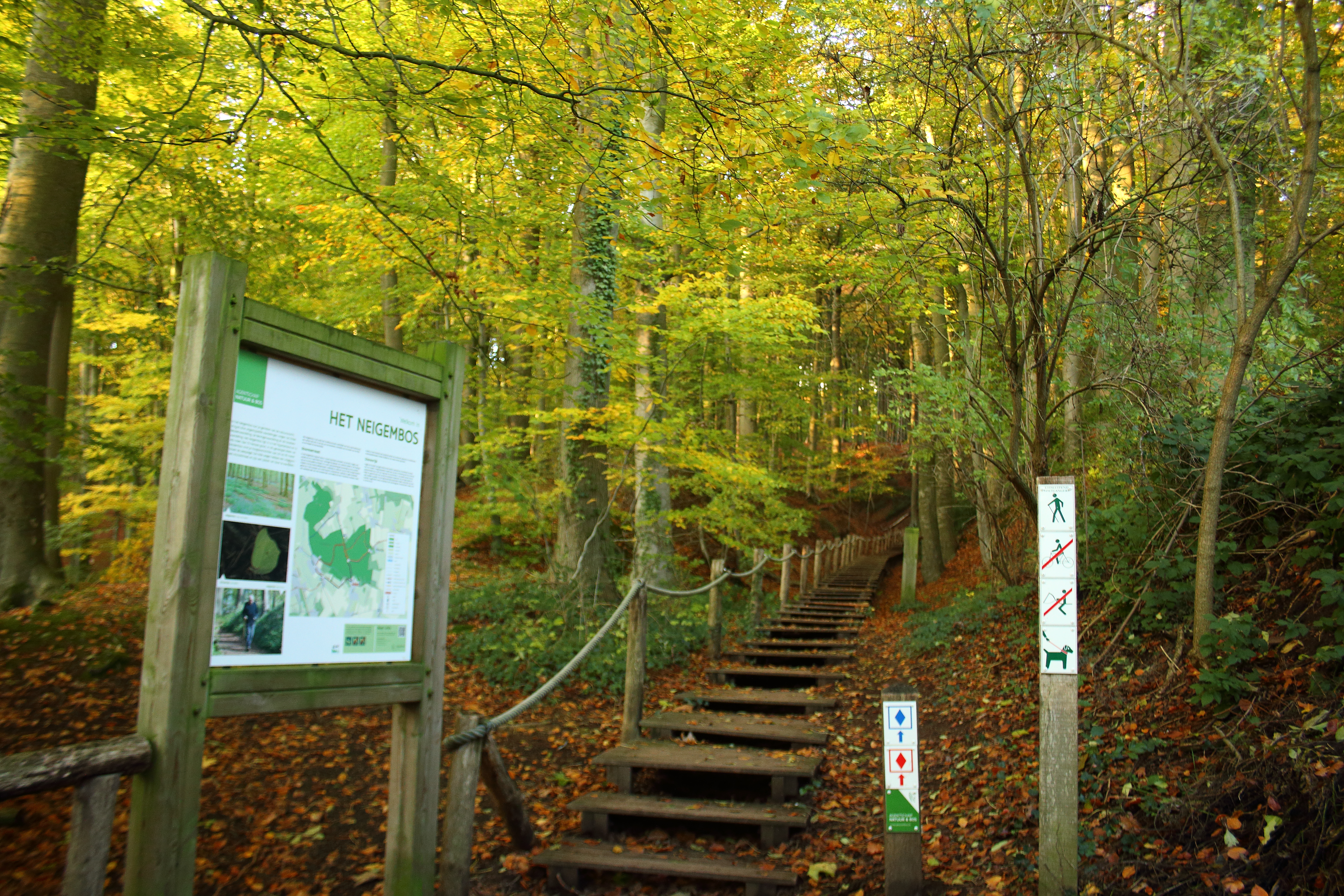
Corduroy road in one of the erosion channels in Neigembos

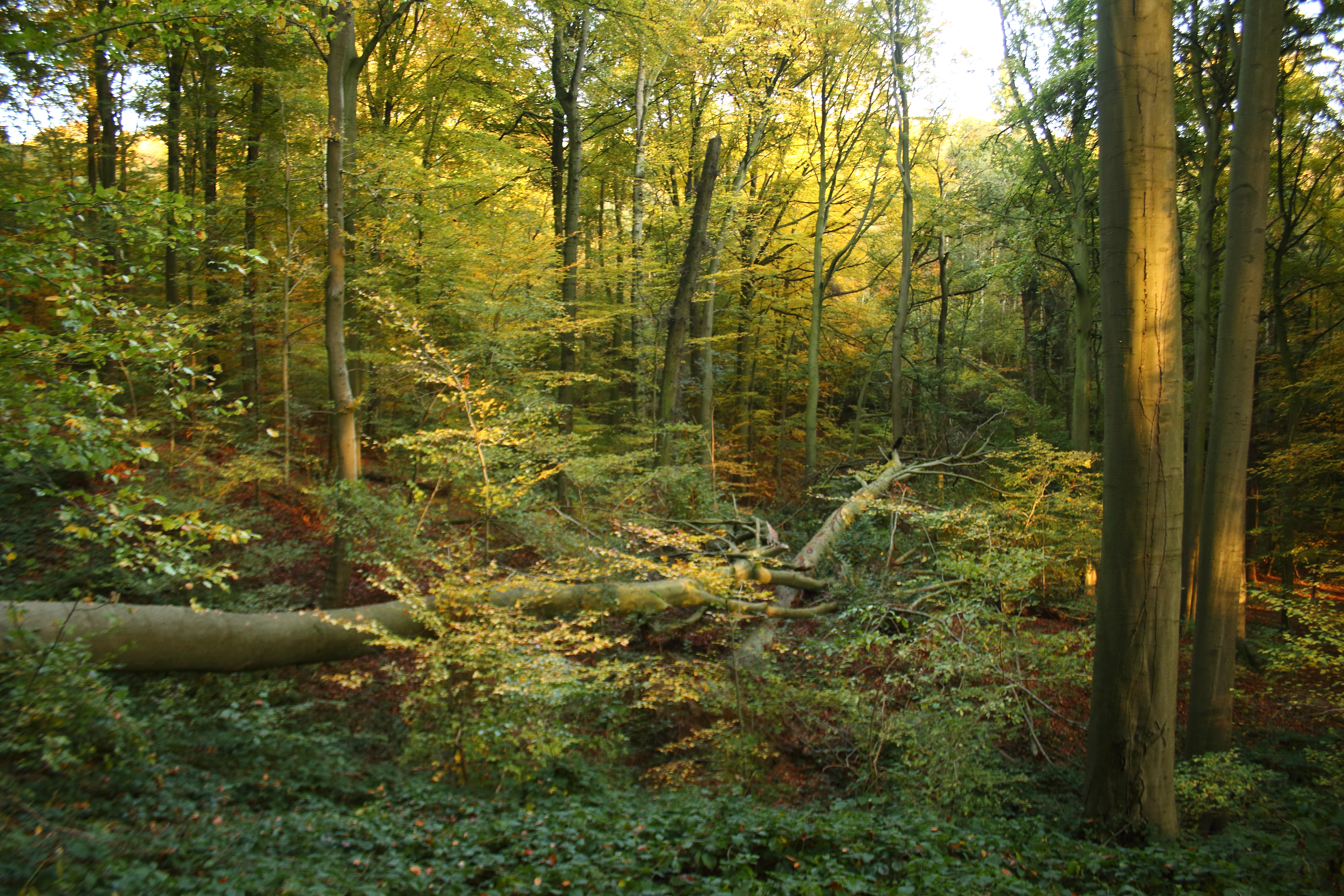
some fallen beeches after a storm

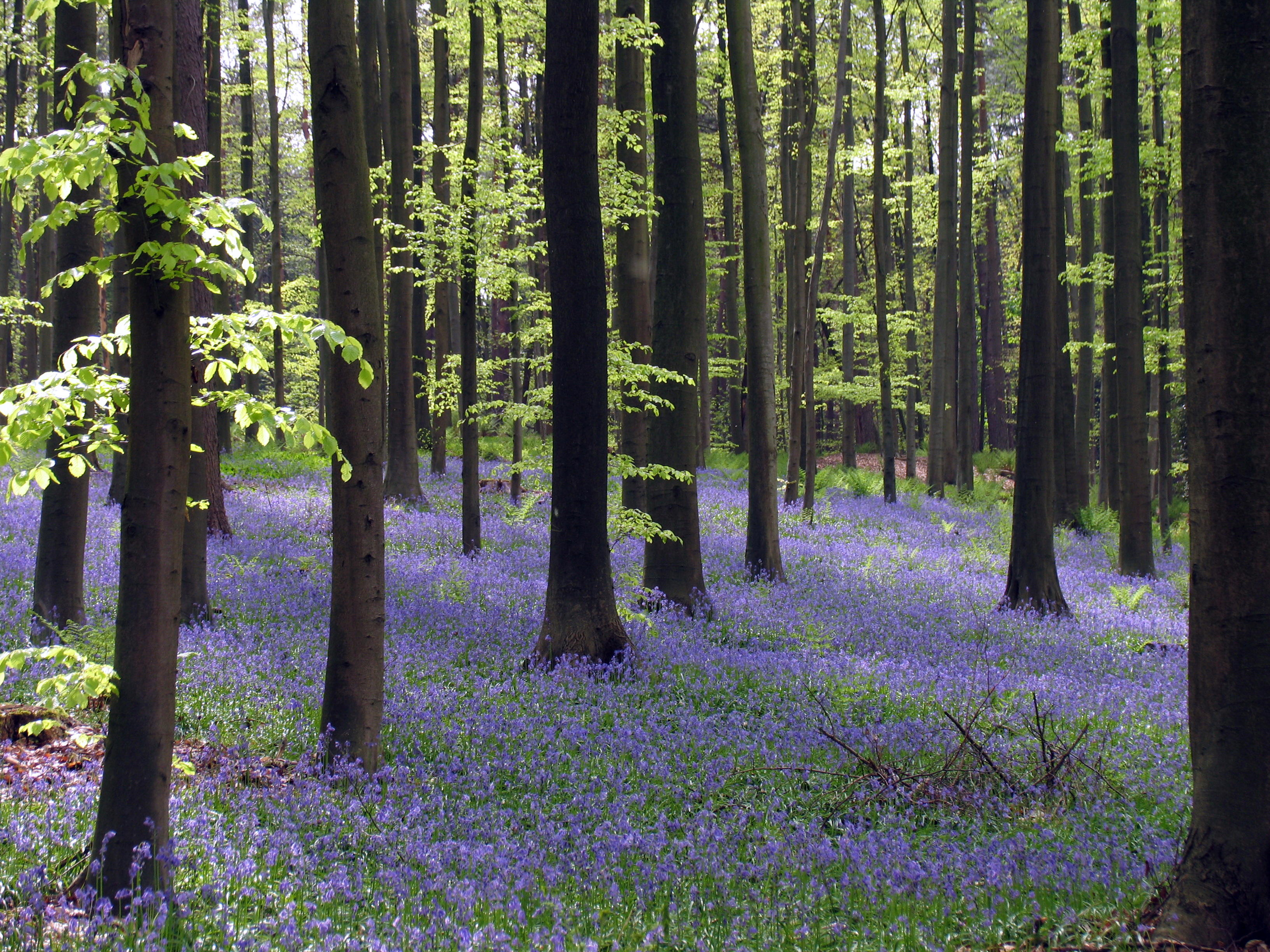
The forest floor covered with a carpet of Hyacinthoides non-scripta

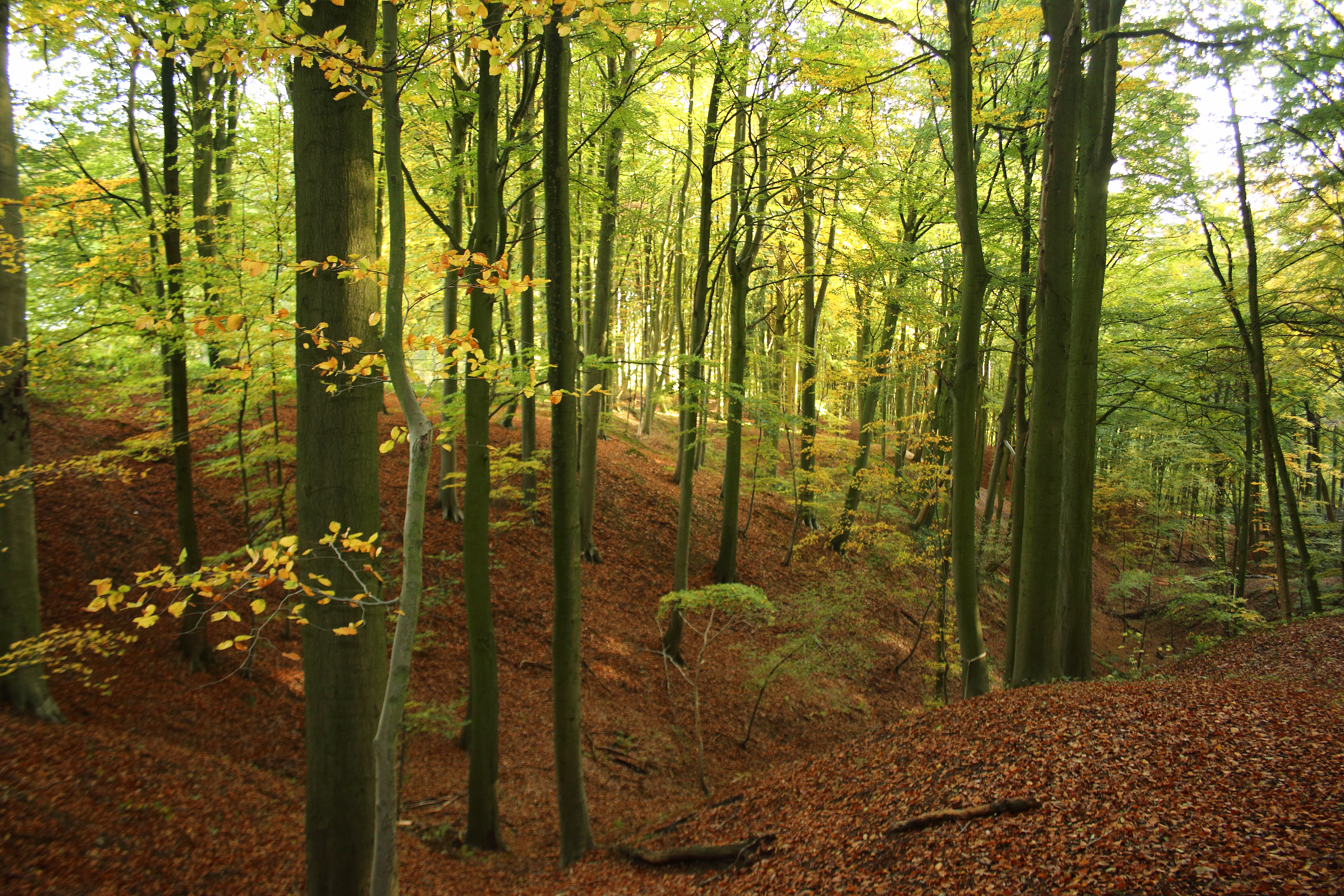
Erosion channel in early autumn

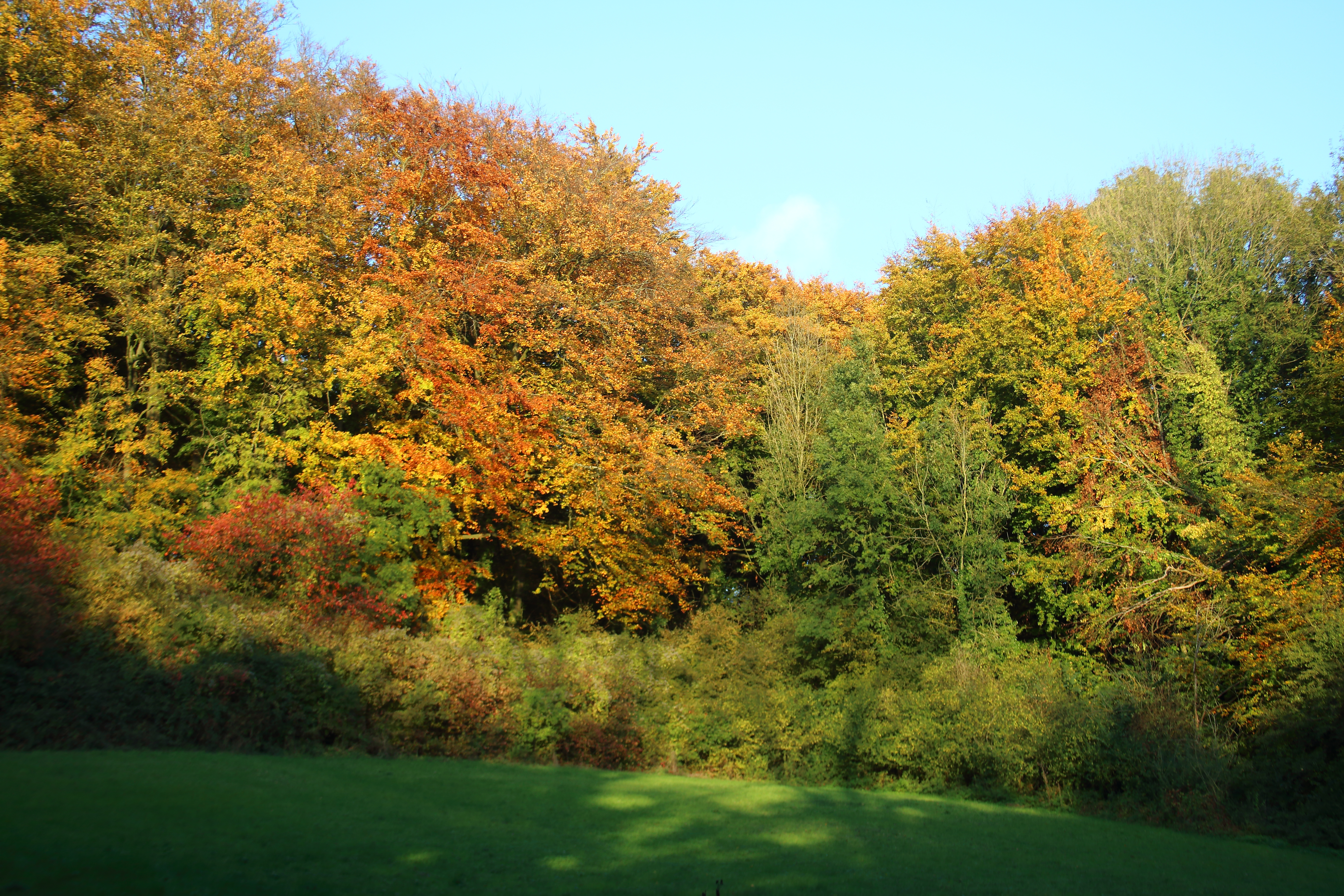
An open earea inside the forest
