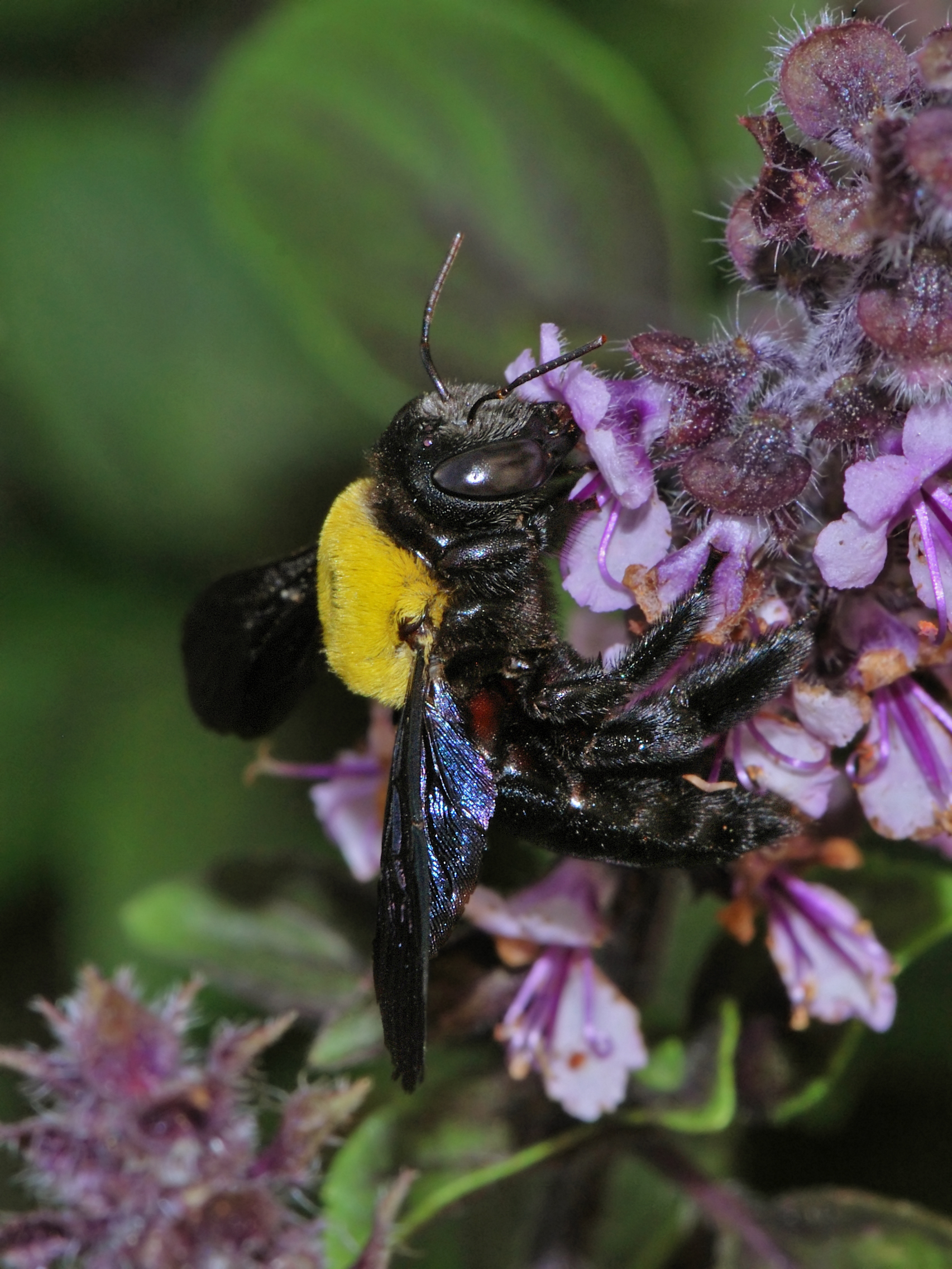
- Female

Scientific classification
- Kingdom: Animalia
- Phylum: Arthropoda
- Class: Insecta
- Order: Hymenoptera
- Family: Apidae
- Genus: Xylocopa
- Species: X. pubescens

Binomial name
- Xylocopa pubescens Spinola, 1838

Synonyms
- Xylocopa aestuans var. rubida Gribodo, 1884; Xylocopa pubescence Eardley, 1987; Xylocopa rubida Gribodo, 1884

= Xylocopa pubescens =

Species of carpenter bee

Xylocopa pubescens is a species of large carpenter bee. Females form nests by excavation with their mandibles, often in dead or soft wood. X. pubescens is commonly found in areas extending from India to Northeast and West Africa. It must reside in these warm climates because it requires a minimum ambient temperature of 18 °C (64 °F) in order to forage.

A common area of study in X. pubescens is its dominance hierarchy and guarding behavior. Colonies start and end with female takeover, either by daughters of the dominant female or by foreign intruders. There is only one reproductively active female in a colony at a time who suppresses the reproduction of other females in the nest. Males hold individual territories which females enter to mate. When an intruder enters another male's territory, the male responds aggressively.

X. pubescens is polylectic, so it forages on many species of plants. It forages on some plants for nectar when preparing bee bread during ontogenesis and forages on others for pollen to feed offspring. Pheromones from Dufour's gland are vital to mark flowers previously visited and also to mark nests so that the foraging bees know where to return. X. pubescens is known to be an effective pollinator, often more effective than honeybees, but it is not commonly used in today's agricultural settings.

== Taxonomy and phylogeny ==
Xylocopa pubescens is in the order Hymenoptera, and in the family Apidae, which is a large bee family. X. pubescens belongs to the Xylocopa ("wood chopper") genus, a genus composed of over 400 species of large carpenter bees. It has sometimes been treated as a subspecies of X. aestuans, though most commonly considered a distinct species. It is a member of the subgenus Koptortosoma, which is the largest Xylocopa subgenus and is widely distributed with over 200 species. Koptortosoma is polyphyletic and constitutes a sister lineage of Mesotrichia. In scientific Greek, Xylocopa pubescens literally means "wood chopper covered with hairs".

== Description ==
Females are large and shiny, black with yellow markings on their heads. Males are smaller than females, distinguished by a narrow head and yellow pubescence that covers their entire bodies.

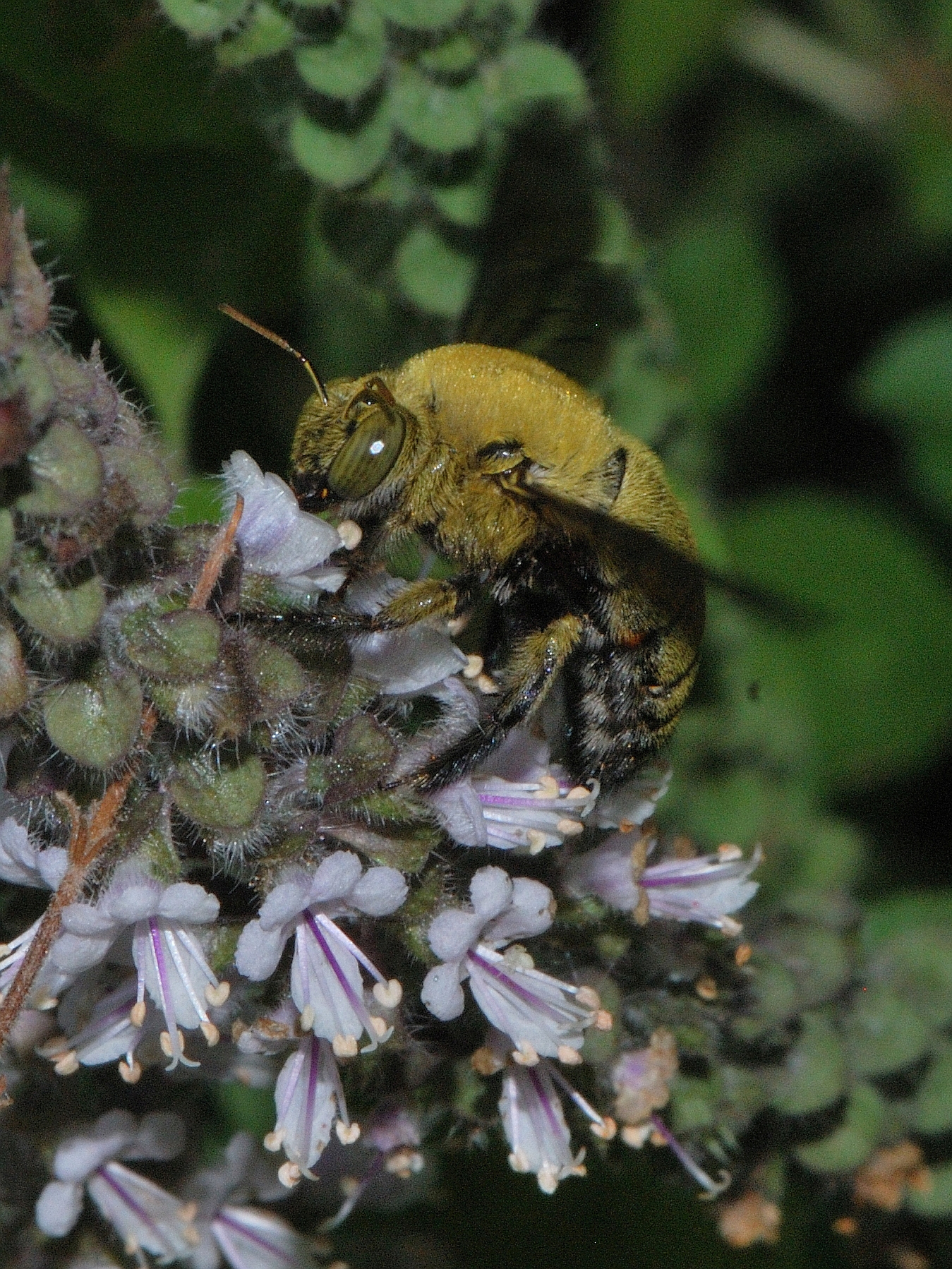
Male

== Distribution and habitat ==
=== Range ===
X. pubescens has been found throughout the Eastern Mediterranean Basin, North Africa and the Middle East. It ranges from Cape Verde to South Asia. It recently expanded its distribution to Spain and Greece in Europe. The species tends to inhabit these relatively warm areas as it requires a minimum temperature of 18 °C (64 °F) in order to forage.

=== Nest structure ===
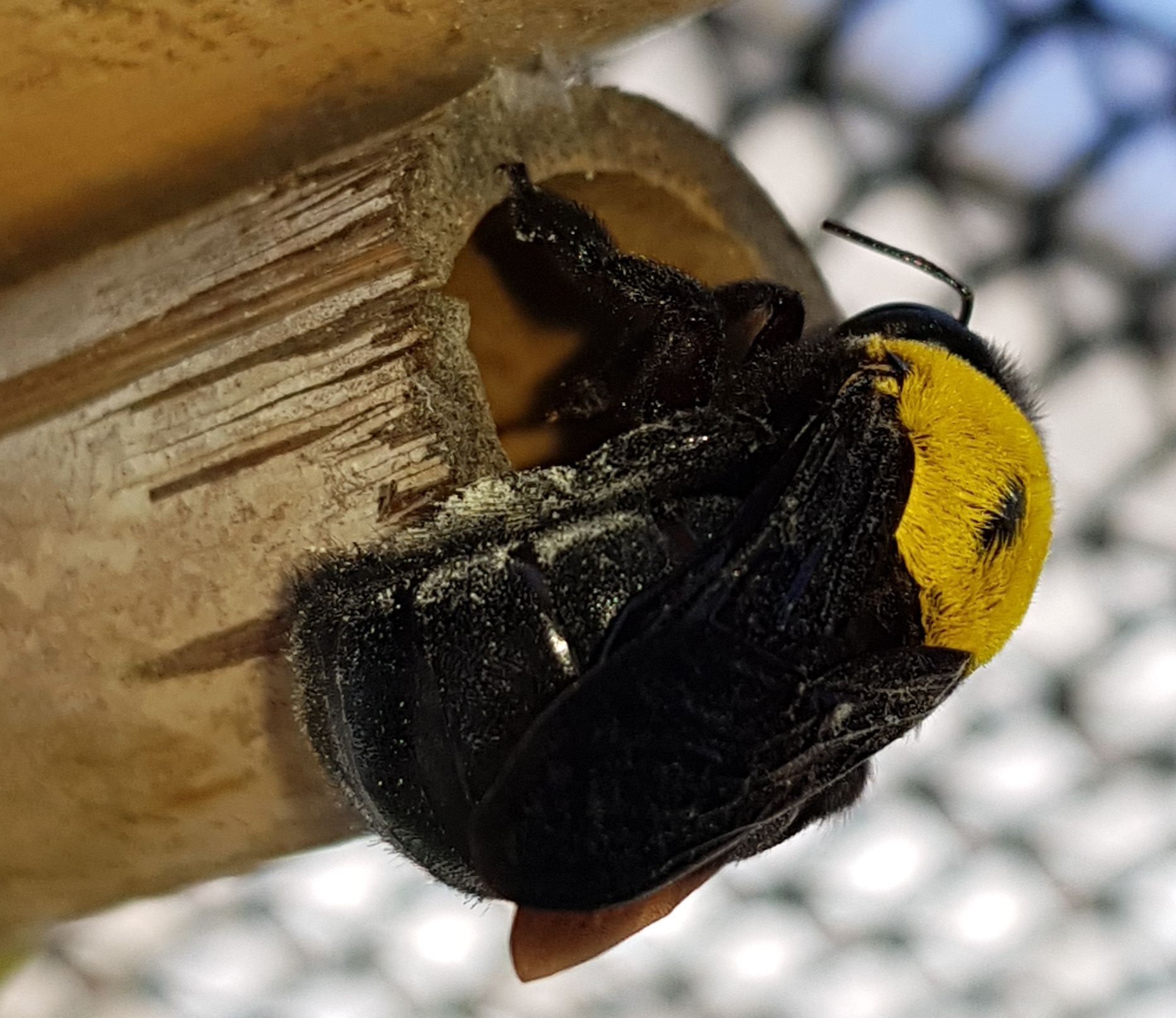
Female and young offspring, solitary nest, dry bamboo cane

Sounds emitted from the nest

Nests can be found in dead and soft wood, as well as the wood of some man-made buildings. X. pubescens makes its nest in dead tree trunks, sticks, canes, branches, or soft wood such as eucalyptus. These nests are sinuous, branched nest typified by short tunnels. Entrance holes are 1.1–1.3 centimetres (0.43–0.51 in) diameter; a widened entryway leads into a chamber that is 1.8–1.2 centimetres (0.71–0.47 in). Tunnels 1.4–1.8 centimetres (0.55–0.71 in) in diameter start at the chamber, follow grain, and are 5–7 centimetres (2.0–2.8 in) long, consisting of few cells each. Females enlarge nests by digging new tunnels when progeny are in the late larval or pupal stages. Progeny often make their own tunnels in the same tunnel complex as the mother, branching off from the common chamber with the mother’s exit hole as the only access to outside. Females can extend tunnels or excavate new nests each nesting cycle. They occasionally widen current tunnels 0.5–1.0 millimetre (0.020–0.039 in) each cycle. The excavating of the nests is done with mandibles.

== Colony cycle ==
Colonies can be founded throughout the breeding season, which takes place from the beginning of March to the beginning of November, depending on ecological conditions. Each colony is founded by a solitary female. The brood is produced continuously as long as space and resources are available. Young males and females emerge from the beginning of May until the end of the breeding season in November. Overlapping generations can be found in nests starting at the beginning of May. All spring nests contain only one bee (either a young female or an old female who has overwintered) until the progeny of the bee enters the pupal stage. After that, between 1–8 adult females may be present one time as new adults remain in the nest for up to 2 weeks. Colony and nesting cycles coincide.

== Ontogenesis ==
Eggs are laid on bee bread in short tunnels in the nest, each containing 1–3 progeny. When the larvae emerge from their eggs, they feed on the bee bread and go through two stages of molting before the pre-pupal stage. The first progeny to emerge will push its siblings father into the tunnel and take over the vacated space. The pre-pupal stage lasts several days before pupation. All pupae begin white and grow darker with time before turning into adults. Abdominal glands in females are white when they are young and grow more yellow as they mature. Total developmental time from egg to adult is around 45–49 days, lasting somewhat less in the summer.

== Dominance hierarchy ==
=== Female takeovers ===
There is one reproductively-dominant female in each nest. Becoming the dominant female in a nest requires a takeover from the previous dominant female. This can be done by either a nest mate, usually a daughter, or an outside intruder. In takeover attempts, fighting occurs and the defeated female either remains in the nest as a guard or leaves to attempt to found or take over another nest. After a takeover occurs, the new dominant female destroys most or all of the old brood. The dominant female must then determine whether or not she will allow the defeated female to remain as a guard. Factors such as age and relatedness play into this decision. A deposed female guard who is young is likely to attempt a takeover of the nest in the future, as is one who is not closely related to the current dominant female. Reproductive output has been shown, however, to increase in guarded nests. If the defeated female is allowed to remain, she too must decide whether or not to do so. This decision depends on the chances of taking over the current nest in the future versus the chances of founding or taking over another nest. A female’s fitness may also benefit more from guarding than leaving the nest. Ecological conditions will also affect a displaced female’s chances of starting a new nest.

=== Reproductive suppression ===
Reproductive suppression is often used in social insect colonies by queens to maintain a genetic monopoly of the offspring in the nest. Some species suppress worker egg laying through pheromones and chemical control. However, in Xylocopa pubescens, the dominant female of the nest suppresses reproduction of any other females in the nest by preventing them access to the cell in the tunnels of the nest necessary for eggs. The only way that another female in the nest can reproduce is if she takes over the nest by force, or leaves to either take over another nest or found her own.

=== Division of labor ===
Labor is divided between guarding and foraging females. The foraging female is the reproductively-dominant one, while the guarding females are either young pre-reproductive females or old formerly reproductive females. Young pre-reproductive females remain in the nest for up to two weeks. During this time they guard the entrance to the nest. This guarding is not their intended consequence however. Rather, this is how the progeny compete for food from the mother, as it is beneficial to be the first one at the entrance when the mother returns from foraging. The mother feeds them via trophallaxis. Old formerly reproductive females become guards when a takeover of reproductive dominance in the nest occurs by a daughter or an outside intruder. The displaced female either remains in the nest as a guard or leaves in order to attempt to take over another nest. Nests that are guarded when the dominant female is out foraging are more reproduction, as more food collection is possible.

== Behavior ==
=== Foraging behavior ===
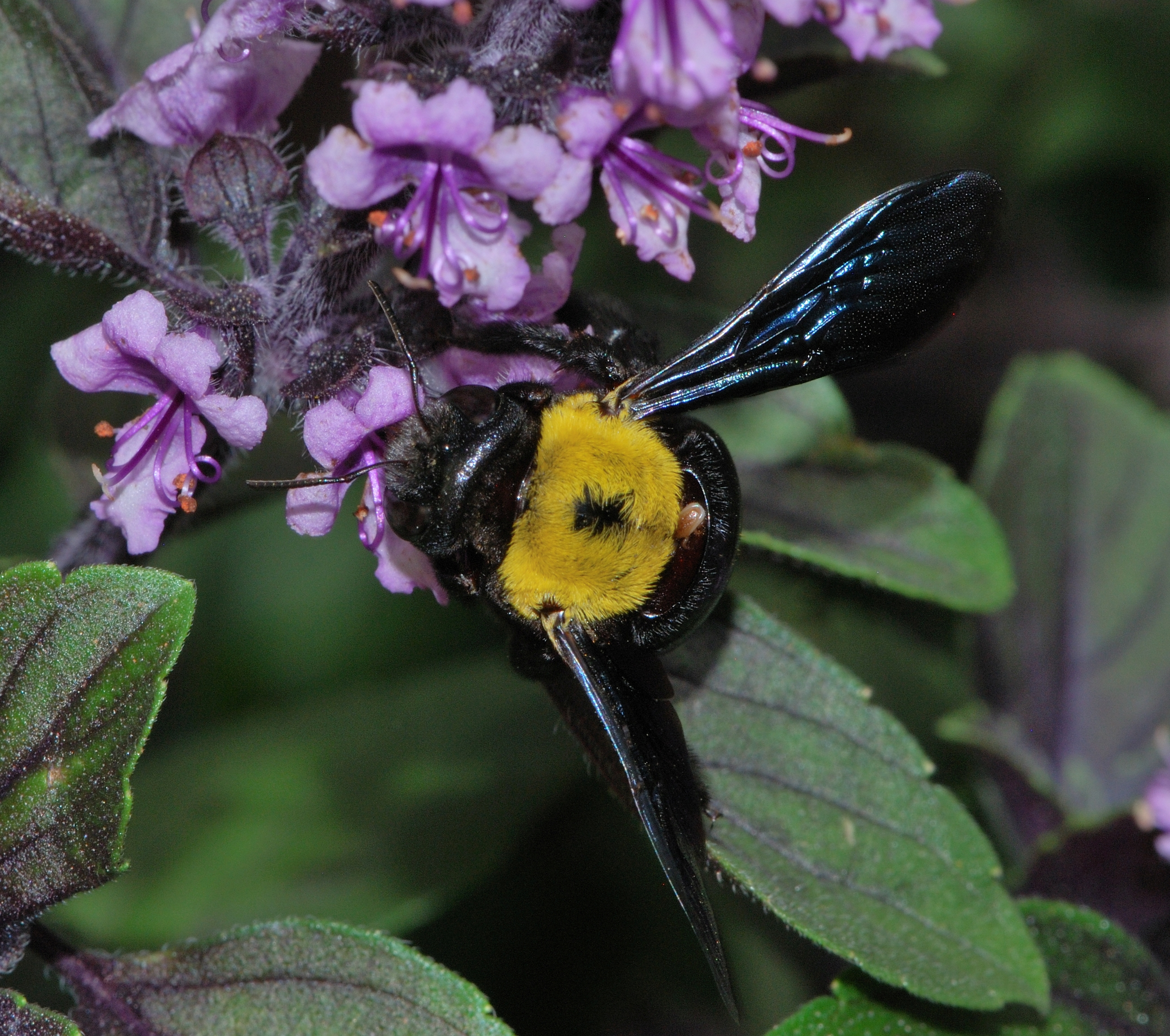
Female foraging on basil. Note symbiotic mite on its back.

X. pubescens cannot forage in temperatures below 18 °C (64 °F), likely due to the energy needed to maintain body heat for their large size. X. pubescens has been found to forage on 30 different plant species in India and 61 different species in Israel. It gathers both nectar and pollen from plants in the spring, summer and fall. In the winter, only nectar is gathered and foraging can only be accomplished on warm days. Mutualism is observed between X. pubescens and several species of plants, as the species pollinated by X. pubescens have been observed to have low or zero fruit set rate if not pollinated by it. X. pubescens is also able to avoid revisiting plants on which it has already foraged by marking the plant with pheromones.

==== Plant visitation ====
X. pubescens is a polylectic bee, meaning it visits many different species of plants. Flower color impacts visitation, and yellow flowers or white flowers that are creamy, purplish, or bluish are preferred. Scent is also an important factor, as most nectar-producing plants visited by X. pubescens have a strong odor to attract bees and insects. As X. pubescens is a large carpenter bee, it prefers medium to large size flowers. Zygomorphic flowers with bilateral symmetry are also preferable. Plants only produce nectar and/or pollen at certain times of the day, while balancing sugar and water amounts in the nectar for foraging bees. Examples of different anthesis schedules are late at night for Careya arborea, the afternoon in Crotalaria species, and all day in Calotropis species. X. pubescens will adjust foraging behavior accordingly. Most flower visits are short, lasting from about 4 seconds to 8.5 seconds.

===== Plants by region =====
In India plants visited by X. pubescens for pollen are Cochlospermum religiosum, as well as Peltophorum, Cassia and Solanum species. Those visited for nectar include Calotropis, Bauhinia, Crotalaria, Anisomeles, and Gmelina species and some other plants.

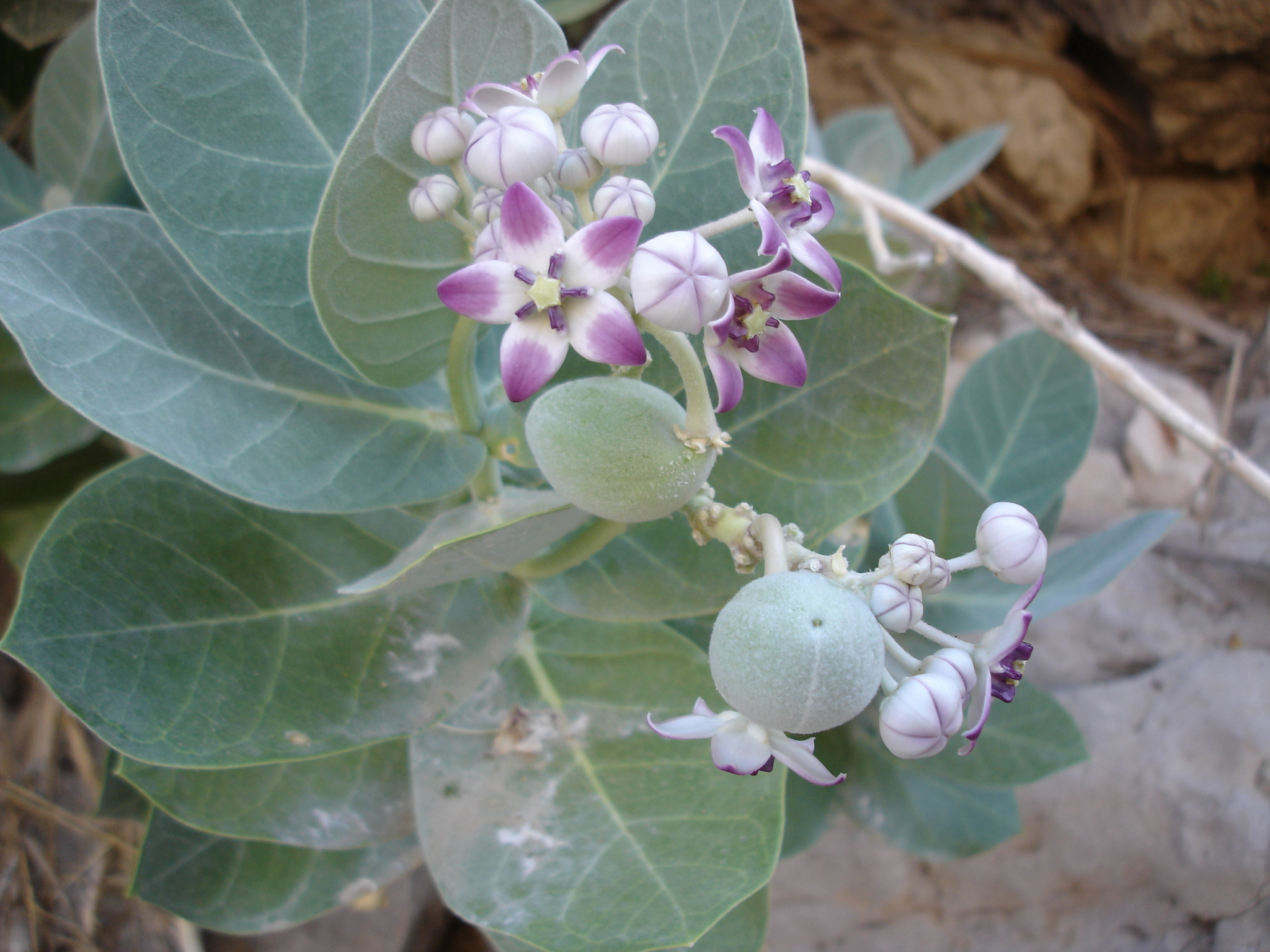
C. procera

In the Mediterranean the most common plants visited by X. pubescens for both pollen and nectar are Helianthus annuus, Parkinsonia aculeate, Luffa aegyptiaca, as well as Lonicera species.

In Israel, the ranges of X. pubescens and X. sulcatipes overlap, leading to competition between the two species for plants to forage on. Both species visit Calotropis procera only for nectar, Retama raetam for both pollen and nectar, and Lucaena only for pollen. Because X. pubescens has a minimum ambient temperature for activity of about 18 °C (64 °F) while X. sulcatipes has a minimum ambient temperature of 21 °C (70 °F), X. pubescens can begin foraging earlier in the day than X. sulcatipes. This allows X. pubescens to get to flowers first, but then after X. sulcatipes begins foraging, it becomes the dominant bee. The bees can recognize when a flower has been previously visited by a bee of either species, and will proceed to avoid that flower.

=== Pollen consumption ===
Pollen slants are created when X. pubescens young are beginning to emerge. Upon arrival from a foraging trip, the female, carrying nectar and/or pollen, proceeds to the end of the tunnel. She then releases the pollen from her hind tibiae by repeated vigorous movements, creating or adding to an existing pollen slant. Nectar is used to wet the pollen slant either by licking the surface after returning from a foraging trip, or by mixing. Unlike their close relative X. sulcatipes, who gather pollen first by many trips and then add nectar later, X. pubescens adds nectar to the pollen slant as it is being formed. These pollen slants are quickly consumed by emerging young and teneral adults, who then must rely on pollen collection by the mother from foraging trips. Competition between the young for food ensues, leading to guarding behavior. About 10 pollen trips by the mother are required per brood cell, in addition to the pollen required by teneral adults and guards in the nest. Developed bees consume about the same amount of food as larvae.

=== Mating behavior ===
Breeding season is early March to early November. Most mating occurs in the spring, but some still occurs in the fall. Mating is not yet well understood in X. pubescens. Males make territorial flights in shaded areas at a height ranging from a few centimeters to a few meters (inches to yards). These territories have been shown to be desirable by all males, as competition for them is common. In the case of an intruder, a male will charge the intruder to drive him away. If the intruder does not avoid the charging male, the charging male will bash the intruder with his head and will continue this pattern until the intruder is driven off. Females come into these male territories to mate, but the mechanics of how this works are not yet known.

=== Nest competition ===
Females in search of nesting sites are attracted to existing holes in wood materials where nests are usually formed. Upon arrival at a desirable site where there are no current inhabitants, the female will inspect the existing tunnel system extensively. If the hole is an occupied and guarded nest, the guarding bee will block the entrance. If not guarded, a resident of the nest will come to block the entrance if in the area by protruding their head from the hole. The stranger will hover around the hole for a brief period of time, and often the resident will attempt to chase the stranger away. If the intruder is able to bypass the resident bee at the entrance, a struggle will ensue accompanied by loud buzzing noises. These struggles can last up to a couple hours. Either the intruder is then thrown out, or will throw out the resident, at which point the process for a takeover occurs, beginning with the eviction of any existing brood. The benefits of guarding behavior can clearly be seen here as strangers hardly ever intrude on social nests containing more than one adult.

== Exocrinology and communication ==
X. pubescens have glands that are vital in their exocrine system and play a large part in communication. One category of glands is the intersegmental glands, also known as the yellow glands. The intersegmental glands are made up of several gland pairs in the abdomen, which open up into the intersegmental membranes. These glands distinguish non-nesting bees from bees that are actively breeding. In non-nesting bees they are compact and white. They increase in size and turn from white to yellow as breeding season progresses. Unicellular secretory elements in these glands empty through a duct into the intersegmental membranes, from which the chemicals are released. The other important glands, especially for communication, is the Dufour's gland. The original role of these glands in various bee species was to produce the brood cell lining, but this function does not exist in Xylocopa species. Instead, these glands are responsible for the production of scent marking pheromones. These are strictly hydrocarbons in X. pubescens, and are used to mark flowers that have been previously visiting on foraging trips in order to avoid them. These scent markings on previously visited flowers are recognized both by X. pubescens and X. sulcatipes, which allows the two species to be more efficient in foraging. This system of scent marking is also involved in nest recognition.

=== Nest recognition ===
X. pubescens use both visual and olfactory cues to recognize their own nests. Nest recognition is vital for foraging females to provision for their brood properly. X. pubescens use its vision to recognize the general location of its nest. Upon exit of the nest to embark on a foraging trip, a female will make an orientation flight for visual familiarity. In instances of nest disturbance, the frequency of these orientation flights increases. Because X. pubescens nests are often found in aggregation, it is important for females to recognize their own specific nests. This is accomplished by olfaction. X. pubescens females whose nests have been disturbed or misplaced among other nests will return to the general location of their nest but will not mistakenly enter another nest due to lack of scent recognition. The Dufour's gland, rectal fluid, or some oral source of odor may contribute to the recognizable nest entrance odor. It is likely that multiple glands are active in marking the nest entrance due to the high specificity required for the scent.

== Interactions with other species ==
=== Predators ===
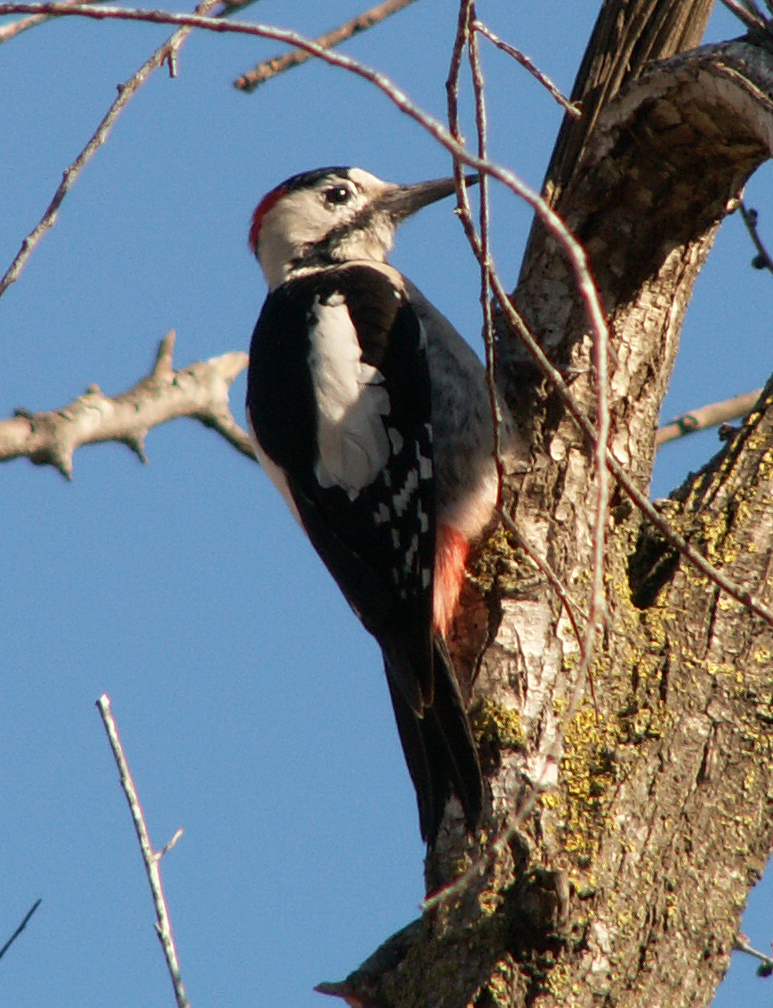
Syrian woodpecker

Ants of various species have been found to invade nests in some Xylocopa species, specifically, Monomorium gracillimum. The ants dig small holes in the tunnel walls of X. pubescens to get into the nest. No confrontation occurs, as the mother attempts to remove as many of her brood as she can before the destruction of the nest and all brood cells. Additionally, because nesting takes place in wood, termites have been found to infiltrate nests, eat the walls, and fill it with refuse. Birds have also been observed to feed on X. pubescens, specifically the woodpecker species Dendrocopos syriacus in Mediterranean regions.

=== Parasites ===
Wasps in the genus Coelopencyrtus are internal parasitoids of mature X. pubescens larvae, with hundreds emerging from each larva. They run on top of X. pubescens nests constantly throughout nesting season, with activity peaking in the fall. Overwintering for Coelopencyrtus occurs in or near dead hosts.

== Agriculture ==
Carpenter bees have been observed pollinating agricultural plants such as passionflower and cotton, but X. pubescens do not naturally pollinate any agricultural plants. However, in a greenhouse setting, X. pubescens have been shown to be a more effective pollinator of honeydew melon than honeybees by increasing the fruit set three times more than a honeybee. The obstacle for using X. pubescens for agricultural purposes is that ways to mass-rear them have not yet been developed.
