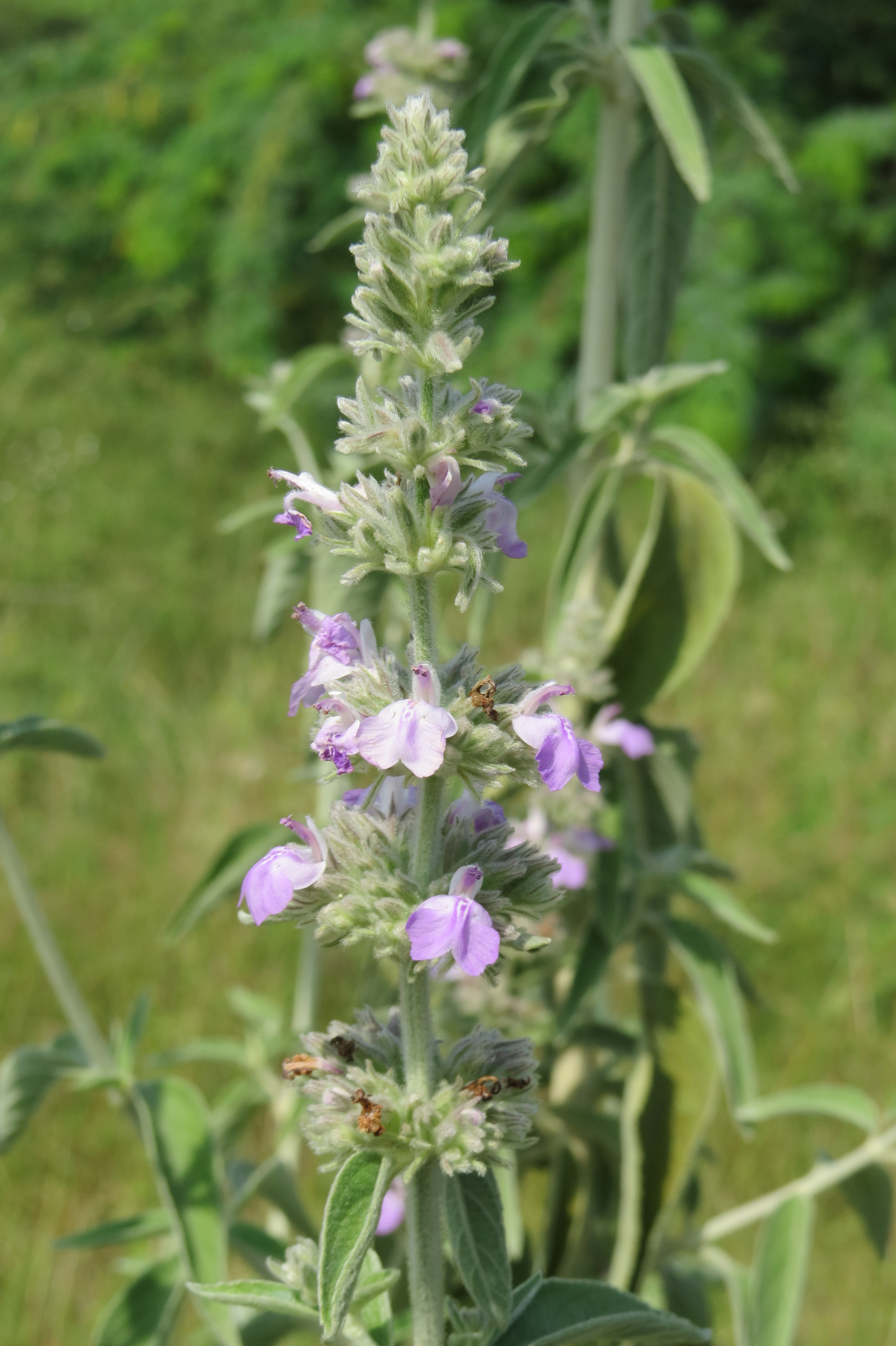
- Anisomeles malabarica

Conservation status
- Least Concern (IUCN 3.1)

Scientific classification
- Kingdom: Plantae
- Clade: Tracheophytes
- Clade: Angiosperms
- Clade: Eudicots
- Clade: Asterids
- Order: Lamiales
- Family: Lamiaceae
- Genus: Anisomeles
- Species: A. malabarica

Binomial name
- Anisomeles malabarica (L.) R.Br. ex Sims
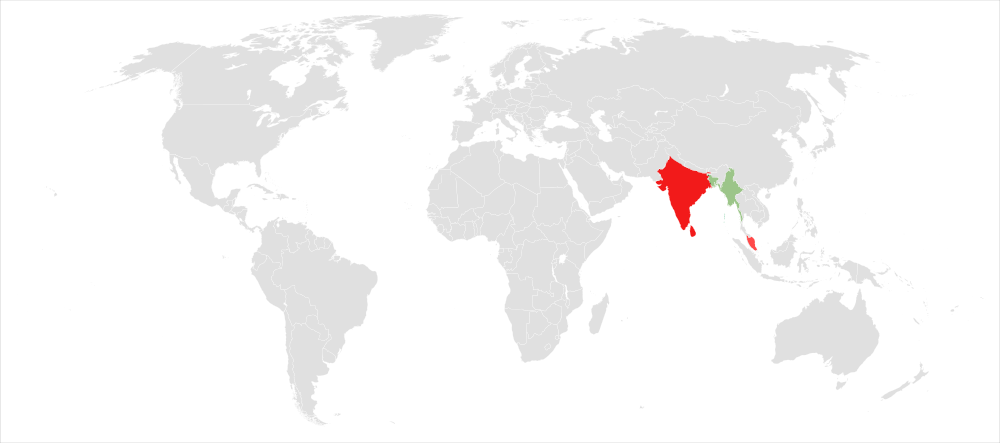
- Distribution of Anisomeles malabarica. Native distribution in red, introduced in green.

Synonyms
- Nepeta malabarica L.; Ajuga fruticosa Roxb.; Epimeredi malabaricus (L.) Rothm.; Nepeta pallida Salisb.; Stachys mauritiana Pers.; Anisomeles intermedia Wight ex Benth.; Craniotome mauritianum (Pers.) Bojer; Anisomeles cuneata J.Jacq

= Anisomeles malabarica =

Species of flowering plant

Anisomeles malabarica, more commonly known as the Malabar catmint, is a species of herbaceous shrub in the family Lamiaceae. It is native to tropical and subtropical regions of India, and Sri Lanka, but can also be found in Malaysia, Bangladesh, Myanmar, Bismarck Archipelago, Mauritius, Andaman Islands and Réunion.

Growing up to 2 m high, it has narrow green leaves 3–8 cm in length, and 1.5–3 cm wide. It is pollinated by sunbirds and carpenter bees, and bears purple flowers in mid spring, though it may also bear the flowers throughout the year. Originally used in Sri Lankan and Hindi folk medicine, the current main uses are medicinal, aromatics and cosmetics.

== Description ==
=== Morphology ===
Anisomeles malabarica is a perennial herbaceous shrub that ranges from 0.9 to 2.0m in height. The thick, petiolate leaves are a narrow oval shape, tapering to a point at each end; with a width of 1.5–3 cm and a length of 3–8 cm. The base of the leaves are narrowly cuneate or attenuate. They are pale above, white below, crenated and woolly, with pinnate venation. The leaves are also lobed, with a prominent gland less than 1 mm deep at the peak of each lobe, and 14–29 lobes on each side of the leaf. The transition from leaves to bracts is abrupt, and the petioles are 9–13 mm long. The stems have a square cross-section and are covered in hair, some or all of which may have glands; however, as the plant ages, the hairs from the top of the plant disappear. However, as the plant ages, the hairs from the top of the plant disappear. The inflorescence of the plant is a single spike consisting of numerous whorls of leaves, with purple flowers arranged in rings oriented horizontally from the axis. The flowers are approximately 2.2 cm long, gullet shaped, and scented, with new flowers lasting for 2 days. The lower lip of the corolla, which serves as a landing place for pollinators, is approximately 12 mm × 4 mm. One plant grows 400–500 flowers on average, which open between 01:00 and 05:00, although anthesis is delayed about an hour on cloudy and foggy days. Each flower has 4 anthers, the longest of which being 13–14 mm long. Anthers of the anterior pair are one-celled, and the posterior pair are two-celled. The fruits of the plant consist of 4 cylindrical nutlets 1.3 mm × 0.9 mm, which bear ellipsoid seeds. The nutlets are a glossy brown to black colour, and smooth, apart from a small basal scar. The polished pericarp of the nutlet is unusual for the genus and results in the attraction of granivores, namely sunbirds.

The calyx has 5 teeth, is 8–12.2 mm long, with hairs 1.2–1.5 mm long. It is attenuated, and does not stop growing until the plant has borne fruit. Unlike other species of Anisomeles, the calyxes do not taper consistently, and the lobes have a long and slender apex. Fruiting calyces are 1.5–2.2 mm apart and cylindrical. Sessile glands are present on nearly all parts of the plant. Its growth begins at the start of the monsoon season, growing from the rootstock and seeds, and it thrives in mesic climates. It is deciduous, losing its leaves during the dry season, as well as after fires.

=== Phytochemistry ===
Phytochemical studies have shown the presence of anisomelic acid, 2- acetoxymalabaric acid, ovatodiolide, betulinic acid, β-sitosterol, anisomelyl acetate anisomelin, malabaric acid, anisomelol and anisomelolide. The essential oil from tops and flowers yields triterpenebetulinic acid, citral and geranic acid.

== Taxonomy ==
First described in 1771, it was initially named Nepeta malabarica L., derived from the region in southwest India it was discovered, Malabar. It wasn’t until 1819 that R. Brown placed it in the genus of Anisomeles. In 1870, it was believed that only the species A. salviifolia was native to Australia, and that all Anisomeles in Australia were variations of this species. However, by 1978, A. salviifolia was reduced to a synonym for A. malabarica, which was then applied to nearly all Australian Anisomeles specimens until 2015, when it was shown that A. malabarica does not occur in Australia.

It is mostly closely related to Anisomeles candicans, though the hair on the stems of A. malabarica is denser, and the hairs on the leaves and outside of the calyx are longer. The edges of the leaves of A. candicans are also more deeply toothed. A. malabarica is also closely related to A. indica, with which it can cross-pollinate, as well as sharing many medicinal uses. Other names for Anisomeles malabarica are Nepeta malabarica L., Ajuga fruticosa Roxb., Craniotome mauritianum (Pers.) Bojer, Epimeredi malabaricus (L.) Rothm., Nepeta pallida Salisb., and Stachys mauritiana. Pers. The defining characteristic of this species is its stems, which are densely covered with short matted woolly hairs, narrow leaves, and long tapered sepals covered in long hairs. The gametophytic chromosome and sporophytic chromosome counts are 17 and 34, respectively.

=== Etymology ===
The scientific name Anisomeles is derived from the Greek for unequal limbs, and could either reference the fact that the upper lip of the corolla is smaller than the lower lip, or the fact that the upper pair of anthers are single-celled, compared to the lower two-celled pair. Malabarica is latin for 'from Malabar', where the plant was discovered.

== Distribution and habitat ==
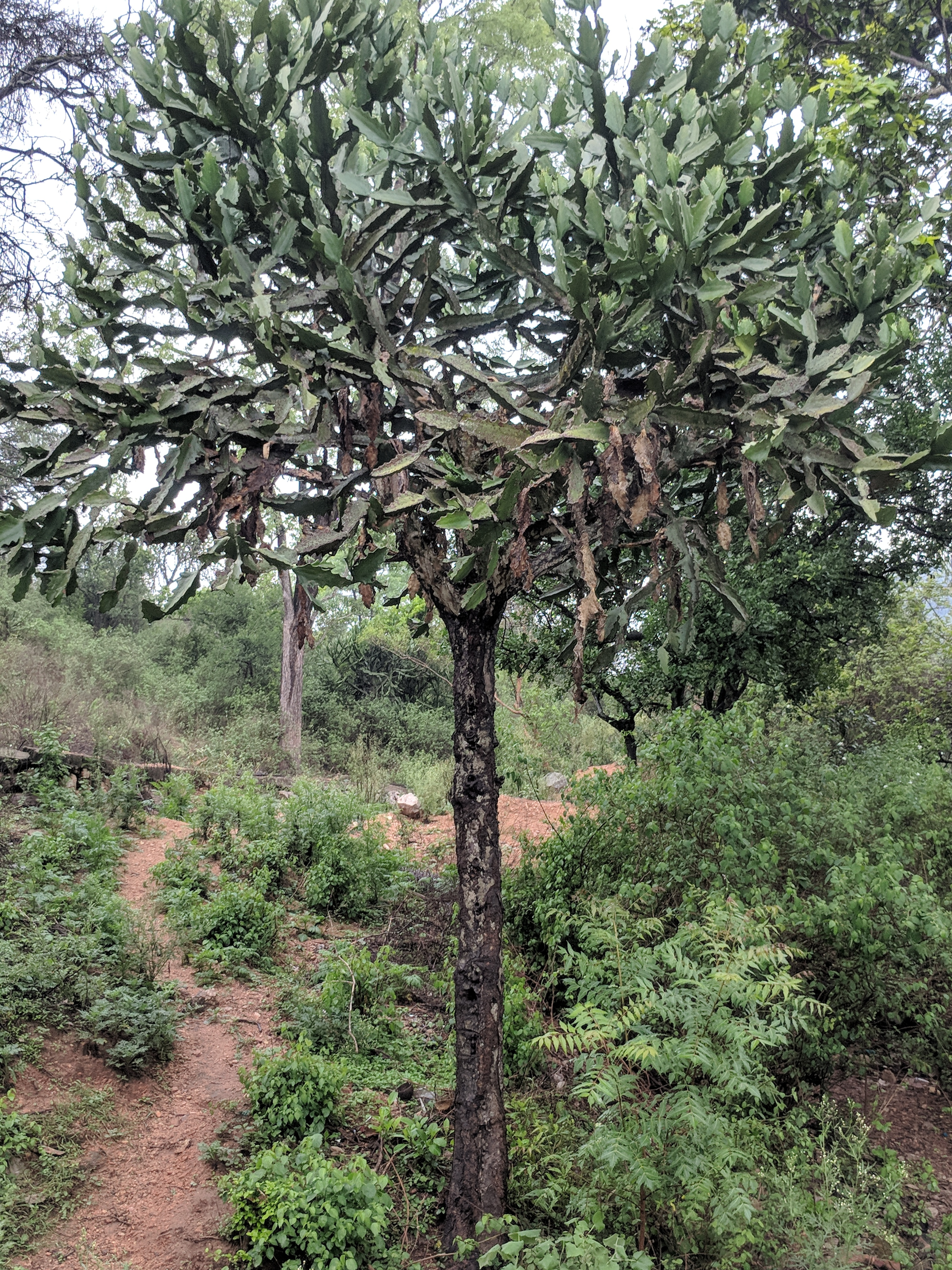
Euphorbia antiquorum plant

This Asiatic plant grows at low altitude in tropical and subtropical climates and is found in Sri Lanka, South India and Ceylon. It has also been introduced to Andaman Is., Bangladesh, Myanmar, Réunion, on Penang Island, Malaysia, and on the island of Mauritius, and grows in disturbed and undisturbed areas with varying soil saturation, often in lowlands and hills. It grows in predominantly sandy terrains such as loam, lateritic soil, and dunes and can be found in sandy flats on dunes near the coast, stream banks and other open areas, as well as "waste ground". It is often associated with the antique spurge (Euphorbia antiquorum) plant, as one of A. malabarica's primary pollinators, the sunbird, builds its nests in the branches. It plays an important role of maintaining the insect and sunbird population in the area. It may also occur with A. indica, but the microhabitats of the species are different. Though initially thought to be native to Mauritius, species present in Mauritius are identical to those from India, indicating that it is an introduced species.

== Ecology ==
Anisomeles malabarica is an herbaceous perennial shrub and is adapted to nototribic (dorsal) pollination. It can reproduce through xenogamy, geitonogamy, and autogamy. Plants that develop from seed appear and flower later than those from the perennial root. It starts growing from the beginning of monsoon season and continues until the plant begins to flower, though in climates with sufficient moisture, growth may continue for years. It commences growth in July, flowers in mid October and, in drier climates, disappears in January. When the plants receive sufficient water, flowers can appear all year round, and they bear fruits in January, April, September and December.

Anisomeles malabarica is pollinated by sunbirds of the genus Nectarinia and carpenter bees, which are attracted by both the colour and density of the flowers. Secondary pollinators include honeybees, stingless bees, leaf-cutter bees, and wasps of the genus Rhynchium. The plant is well adapted for pollination by bees due to large volumes of nectar with high sugar content coupled with the production of new flowers daily. The larger lower corolla lip also serves as landing place for the bees. When a bee collects nectar, the stigma brushes against the back of its head, which is covered in pollen. For sunbirds, the stigma and anthers contact the bill and forehead when they forage for the nectar. The pollen is viable for 64 hours after dehiscene. Carpenter bees defend the plants from nectar-robbers such as ants. This territorial behaviour may increase xenogamy and outcrossing of the plant through long-range dispersion of pollen. The nectar is also protected from unwanted foragers by a ring of hairs at the base of the stamen. The bees and sunbirds also travel considerable distances, which promotes the movement of pollen between and among different species of Anisomeles. The trap-lining behaviour of both the bees and sunbirds also augments cross-pollination. The Malabar catmint is also an important source of food for sunbirds, as it is the only plant available during the winter season. In the absence of pollinators, the plants resort to self-pollination shortly before flowers turn dysfunctional.

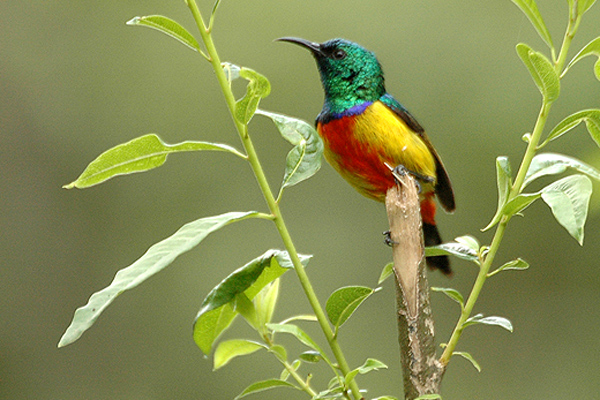
Sunbird in the genus Nectarinia

In climates with moderate moisture, the plant may grow for some years. However, in places with dry seasons, the leaves fall off and the stems die, with new stems returning during the wet season. This process also occurs after a fire. Cross-pollination between A. malabarica and A. indica is not uncommon, with the cross-pollinated plants producing more fruit and seeds, though plants produce limited seed in the absence of pollinators. Examples include A. heyneana and A. nepalensis. It has been speculated that Anisomeles xerophila is an infrequent hybrid between A. indica and A. malabarica as its morphological characteristics are intermediate between the two species, and it has only been found in the overlap of their habitats.

== Uses ==
A. malabarica is used for medicine, fragrances, and cosmetics. It has been used for centuries as a medicinal herb in Indian and Sri Lankan folk medicine, with all components, the leaves and roots in particular, being used to treat a range of conditions including congenital mental disabilities, fevers arising from teething, and swelling. The decoction of the leaf and essential oil are also used externally in rheumatic arthritis. There is evidence to support most of these applications, in addition to being effective for epilepsy, intestinal worms, halitosis, and gout. It has also been shown to have anti-cancer, anti-inflammatory, antiallergic, anti-anaphylactic, and anti-bacterial properties. In addition, it has been posited that the antimicrobial compounds in A. malabarica may inhibit bacteria differently to current methods.

Due to its ability to grow in soil of varying water-saturation, it is also used road-side for aesthetics and soil-binding.

=== Cultivation ===
A. malabarica can be cultivated by seed or by rhizome cuttings, but are often collected from the wild, though it is cultivated in China. After collecting, the plants are washed and used fresh, or dried and stored for later use. It can also be cultivated as garden ornamentals, along with hybrid species between it and A. indica. Hybridisation between the two species has been manipulated by "conventional breeding methods", with experimental hybridisation resulting in 40% seed production.
