= Anisomeles ajugacea =

Conservation status
- Least Concern (NCA)

Scientific classification
- Kingdom: Plantae
- Clade: Tracheophytes
- Clade: Angiosperms
- Clade: Eudicots
- Clade: Asterids
- Order: Lamiales
- Family: Lamiaceae
- Genus: Anisomeles
- Species: A. ajugacea

Binomial name
- Anisomeles ajugacea (F.M.Bailey & F.Muell.) A.R.Bean

Species of flowering plant

Anisomeles ajugacea is a species of flowering plant in the family Lamiaceae and is endemic to Queensland. It is a low-lying shrub with egg-shaped to heart-shaped stem-leaves with a gradual transition to flora bracts on the upper part of the stem, and small groups of pink flowers.

== Description ==
Anisomeles ajugacea is a low-lying to prostrate shrub that typically grows to a height of 5–20 cm (2.0–7.9 in) and is sparsely covered with hairs. The leaves are egg-shaped to heart-shaped, 16–29 mm (0.63–1.14 in) long and 14–24 mm (0.55–0.94 in) wide with between two and four teeth on each side. The leaves are arranaged along the stem with the upper leaves transitioning to floral bracts that are egg-shaped, 5–13 mm (0.20–0.51 in) long and 3–7 mm (0.12–0.28 in) wide. The flowers are arranged in groups of three to five with spatula-shaped bracteoles 5–10 mm (0.20–0.39 in) long and 1–3 mm (0.039–0.118 in) wide. The lower lip of the corolla is pink, 9.8–11.3 mm (0.39–0.44 in) long and the stamens are 12–14 mm (0.47–0.55 in) long. Flowering occurs from April to July and the fruit is a schizocarp containing nutlets 2.3–2.6 mm (0.091–0.102 in) long.

== Taxonomy ==
This species was first formally described in 1888 by Frederick Manson Bailey and Ferdinand von Mueller who gave it the name Teucrium ajugaceum. In 2015, Anthony Bean changed the name to Anisomeles ajugacea in the journal Austrobaileya.

For many years, the species was thought to be extinct, until it was rediscovered on Cape York, between Cooktown and Lockhart River in May 2004. Previous to this, the species had not been seen since 1891.

== Distribution and habitat ==
Anisomelea ajugacea grows on low rises and flats in woodland within a 40 km (25 mi) radius of Musgrave on the Cape York Peninsula of Queensland.

== Conservation status ==
This species is listed as of "least concern" under the Queensland Government Nature Conservation Act 1992.
