= Catnip (disambiguation) =

Catnip, Nepeta cataria, is a species in the family Lamiaceae (mint).

Catnip may also refer to:

- Nepeta, cat mint or catnip, the plant genus
- Nepetalactone, the cat attractant in the catnip plant
- Methcathinone, a drug sometimes called "catnip"

== See also ==
- Catmint (disambiguation)
