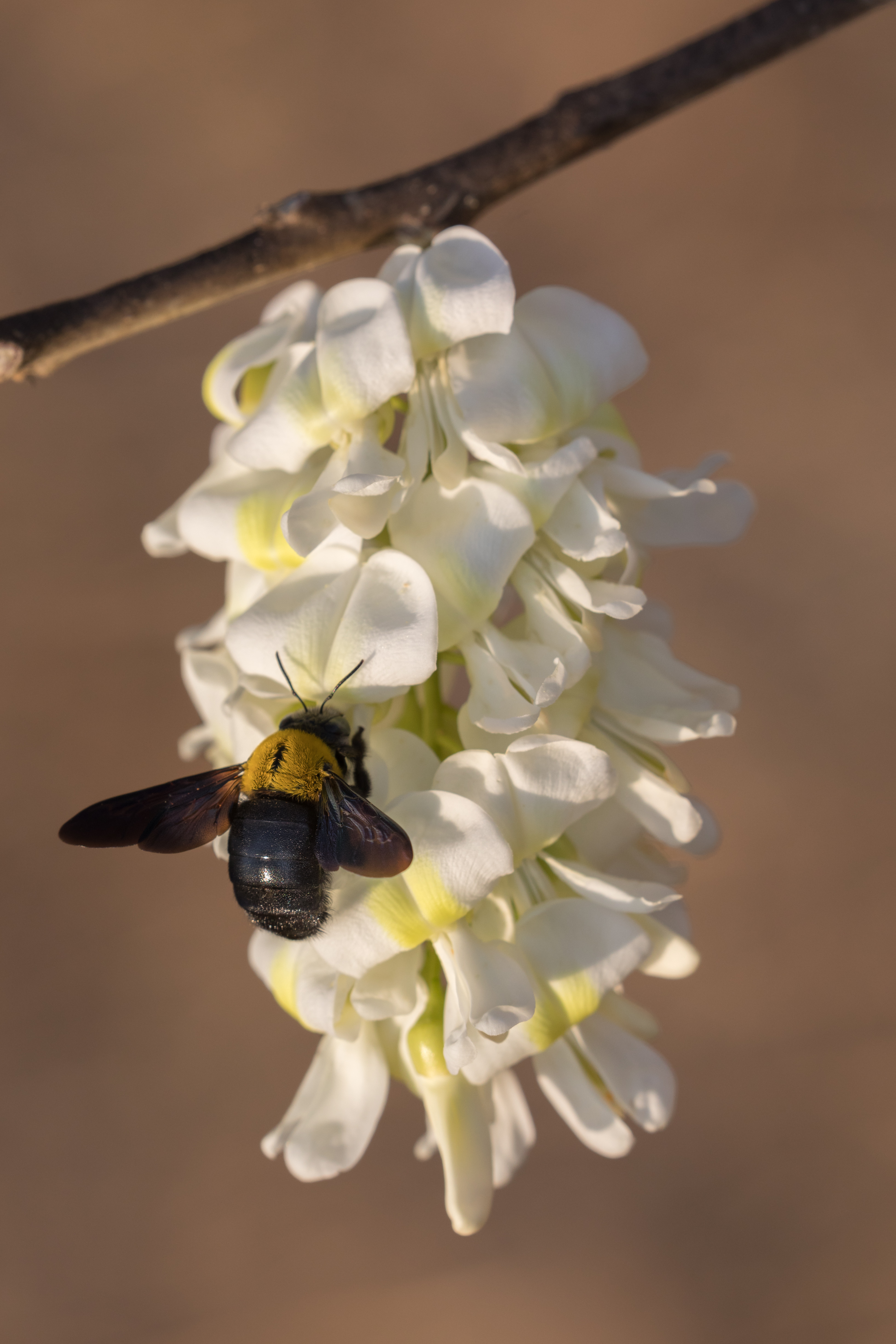

Scientific classification
- Kingdom: Animalia
- Phylum: Arthropoda
- Class: Insecta
- Order: Hymenoptera
- Family: Apidae
- Genus: Xylocopa
- Species: X. aestuans

Binomial name
- Xylocopa aestuans (Linnaeus, 1758)

Synonyms
- Apis aestuans Linnaeus, 1758; Apis leucothorax DeGeer, 1773; Xylocopa confusa Pérez, 1901; Xylocopa leucothorax (DeGeer, 1773); Xylocopa (Orbitella_homonym) confusa Pérez, 1901; Xylocopa (Maiella) confusa Pérez, 1901

= Xylocopa aestuans =

Species of bee

Xylocopa aestuans, or Xylocopa (Koptortosoma) aestuans, is a species of carpenter bee. It is widely distributed in Southeast Asia.

It is a large bee, measuring more than 20mm in length. Historically, Xylocopa pubescens has sometimes been treated as a subspecies of aestuans. The two taxa have different distributions, with X. aestuans restricted to Southeast Asia, while X. pubescens occurs throughout most of Africa and eastward as far as the entire region of South Asia. There are also very clear, but subtle differences in the morphology of females and males.
