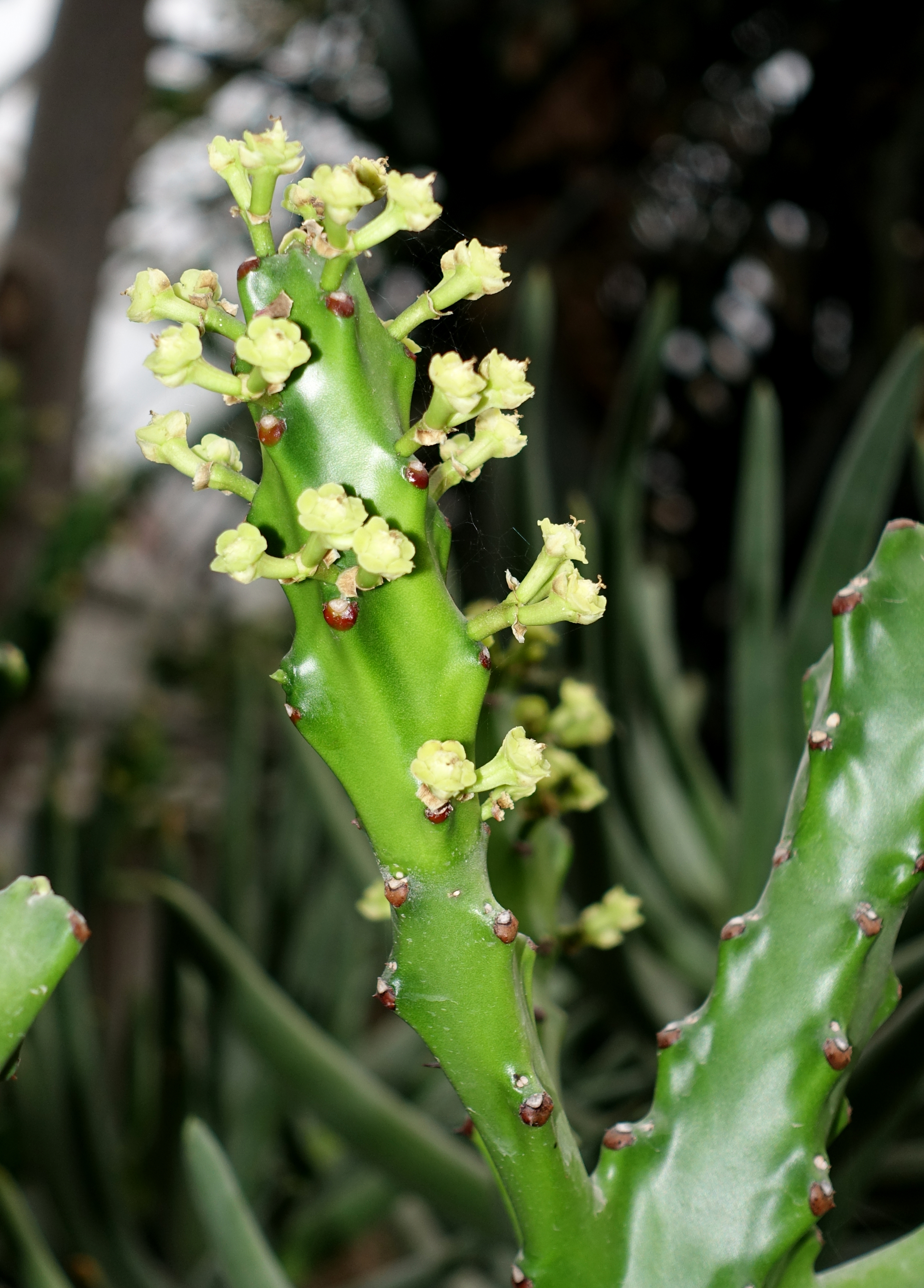
- CITES Appendix II

Scientific classification
- Kingdom: Plantae
- Clade: Tracheophytes
- Clade: Angiosperms
- Clade: Eudicots
- Clade: Rosids
- Order: Malpighiales
- Family: Euphorbiaceae
- Genus: Euphorbia
- Species: E. antiquorum

Binomial name
- Euphorbia antiquorum L.

Synonyms
- Euphorbia arborescens Roxb.; Euphorbia mayuranathanii Croizat; Tithymalus antiquorus (L.) Moench

= Euphorbia antiquorum =

Species of succulent

Euphorbia antiquorum, known as antique spurge and "Euphorbia of the Ancients", is a species of succulent plant in the family Euphorbiaceae. It is widespread throughout peninsular India, but its wild origin is obscure. Escaped or naturalized and widely cultivated in neighbouring regions, such as Burma, China, Bangladesh, India, Indonesia, Iran, Malaysia, Myanmar, Pakistan, Thailand, the Philippines, Sri Lanka, and Vietnam, and in many tropical zones worldwide.

The juice of this plant is a potent ingredient for a mixture of wall plaster, according to the Samarāṅgaṇa Sūtradhāra, which is a Sanskrit treatise dealing with Śilpaśāstra (Hindu science of art and construction).

This species is the type species of the genus Euphorbia.

As most other succulent members of the genus Euphorbia, its trade is regulated under Appendix II of CITES.

== See also ==
- Euphorbia
- Succulent euphorbias
