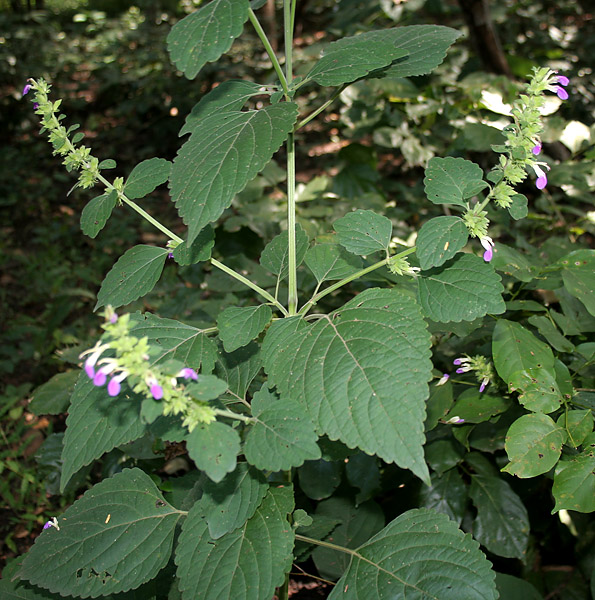

Scientific classification
- Kingdom: Plantae
- Clade: Embryophytes
- Clade: Tracheophytes
- Clade: Spermatophytes
- Clade: Angiosperms
- Clade: Eudicots
- Clade: Asterids
- Order: Lamiales
- Family: Lamiaceae
- Genus: Anisomeles
- Species: A. indica

Binomial name
- Anisomeles indica (L.) Kuntze

Synonyms
- Ajuga disticha (L.) Roxb.; Ajuga glabrata Benth. ex Wall. nom. inval.; Ajuga mollissima Wall. ex Steud.; Anisomeles albiflora (Hassk.) Miq.; Anisomeles disticha (L.) B.Heyne ex Roth; Anisomeles glabrata Benth. ex Wall. nom. inval.; Anisomeles mollissima Wall. nom. inval.; Anisomeles ovata W.T.Aiton nom. illeg.; Anisomeles secunda Kuntze nom. illeg.; Anisomeles tonkinensis Gand.; Ballota disticha L.; Ballota mauritiana Pers.; Epimeredi indicus (L.) Rothm.; Epimeredi secundus Rothm.; Marrubium indicum (L.) Burm.f.; Monarda zeylanica Burm.f.; Nepeta amboinica L.f.; Nepeta disticha (L.) Blume; Nepeta indica L.; Phlomis alba Blanco nom. illeg.

= Anisomeles indica =

Species of flowering plant

Anisomeles indica, or catmint, is a species of herbaceous plant native to eastern Asia and naturalized on some Pacific islands. It belongs to Lamiaceae family. In Bangla it's called Gobura/Opang, in Hindi - Kala bhangra/Gobara. Other names - Malabar catmint, Chedayan, Gopali, Thoiding Angoura,

Habit and Habitat

It is an erect, annual or short-lived perennial herbaceous plant. Height: The plant generally grows to a Height of 1-2 meters (approximately 3-6 feet). Stems: Its stems are square shaped and slightly woody at the base. it has slightly fuzzy leaves that are bright green.

The flower has a strong pungent smell.

It is highly adaptable, native to subtropical regions of Asia including Bangladesh, India, China, Sri Lanka, Myanmar, Thailand, Malaysia, Indonesia, New Guinea, Vietnam.

Uses

Indian catmint acts as an effective mosquito repellant. It is used in traditional medicine. The leaves can calm indigestion, manages fever, coughs and common cold. Traditionally the leaves have been used to relieve menstrual cycles.
