= Giant horsetail =

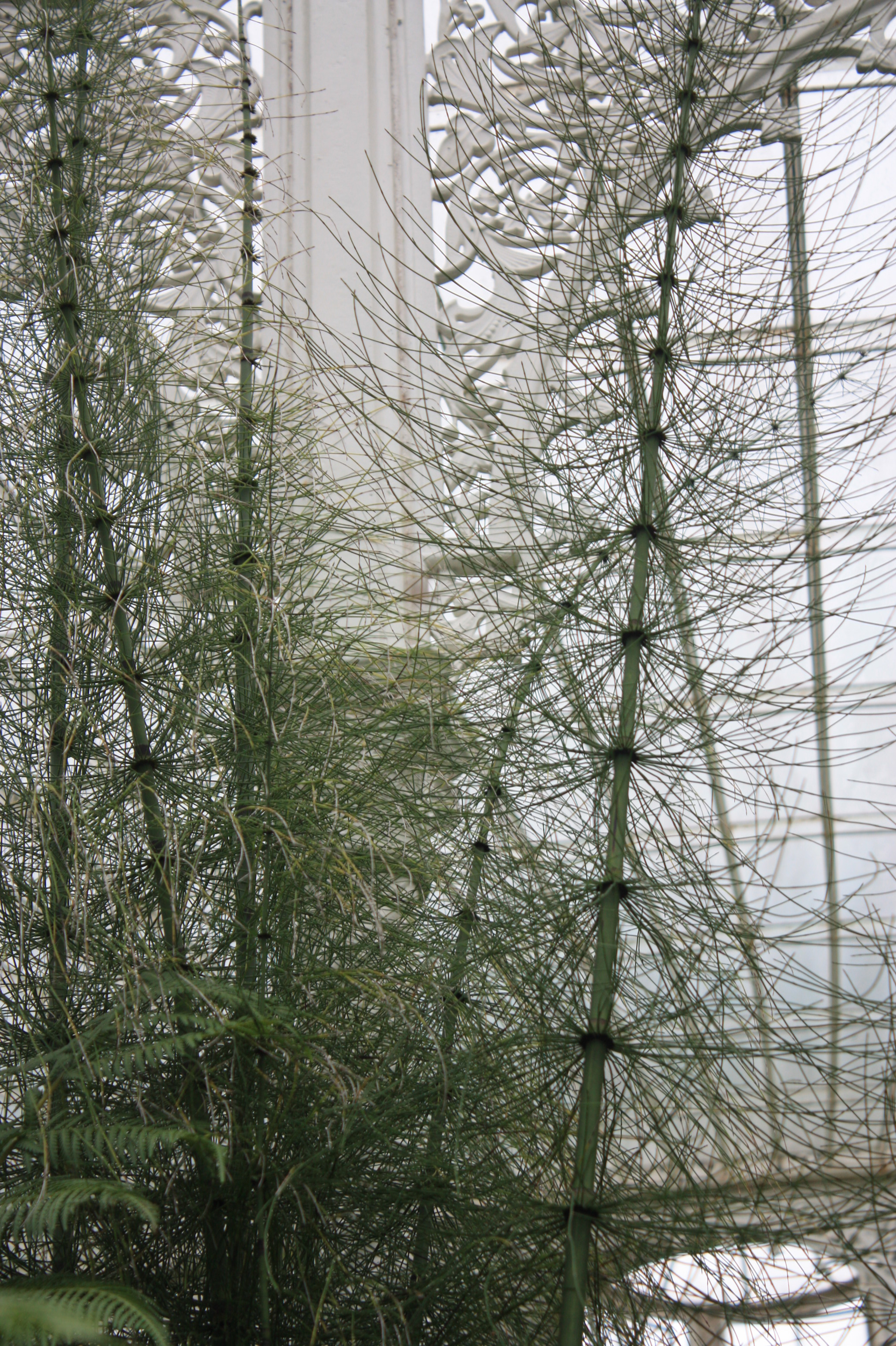
Giant horsetail, Kibble Palace, Glasgow

Giant horsetails are usually living species of horsetail that grow to very large sizes, more than 1.5 metres (5 ft).

The following species are commonly known as "giant horsetails":

- Equisetum giganteum (southern giant horsetail, from Latin America)
- Equisetum braunii (northern giant horsetail, from North America)
- Equisetum myriochaetum (Mexican giant horsetail, from Mexico, Central America and Northern South America)

In addition, any giant member of the Equisetopsida (horsetails and their prehistoric relatives) is liable to be called "giant horsetail" even though they are not true horsetails. Most often, the term "giant horsetail" in this somewhat inaccurate sense refers to Calamitaceae in Paleozoic contexts; in the Mesozoic, the term usually refers to the Equisetites assemblage.

The oldest known fossil of giant horsetail dates from Miocene epoch and is found in Ñirihuau Formation in Patagonia.
