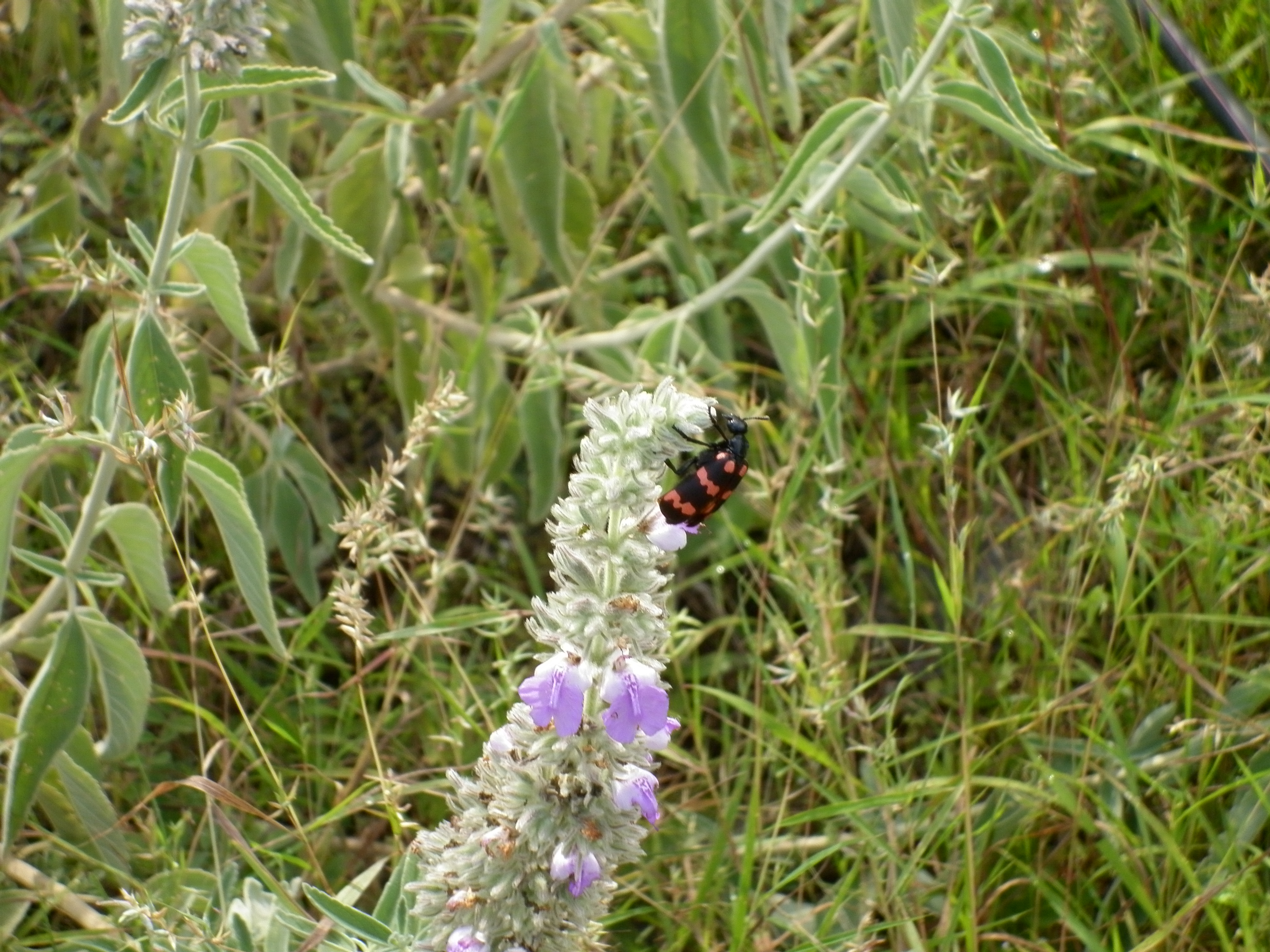
- Anisomeles malabarica

Scientific classification
- Kingdom: Plantae
- Clade: Tracheophytes
- Clade: Angiosperms
- Clade: Eudicots
- Clade: Asterids
- Order: Lamiales
- Family: Lamiaceae
- Subfamily: Lamioideae
- Genus: Anisomeles; R.Br.

Synonyms
- Epimeredi Adans.

= Anisomeles =

Genus of flowering plants

Anisomeles is a genus of herbs of the family Lamiaceae and is native to China, the Indian Subcontinent, Southeast Asia, New Guinea, Australia, Madagascar, and some Pacific and Indian Ocean islands. Plants in the genus Anisomeles have small, flat, narrow elliptic to narrow e.g.-shaped leaves arranged in opposite pairs, the edges of the leaves sometimes wavy or serrated. The flowers are arranged in groups, with five sepals and five petals in two "lips", the lower lip with three lobes, the middle lobe much longer than the side lobes. There are four stamens that extend beyond the petals and a single style in a depression on top of the ovary. The fruit is a schizocarp with four nutlets containing small seeds.

== Taxonomy ==
The genus Anisomeles was first formally described in 1810 by Robert Brown in his Prodromus Florae Novae Hollandiae et Insulae Van Diemen. The name Anisomeles means "unequal limbs", referring to the petal lobes.

== Species list ==
The following is a list of species of Anisomeles accepted by Plants of the World Online as of March 2021:

- Anisomeles ajugacea (F.M.Bailey & F.Muell.) A.R.Bean - Queensland
- Anisomeles antrorsa A.R.Bean - Queensland
- Anisomeles bundelensis A.R.Bean - Northern Territory
- Anisomeles candicans Benth. - Myanmar, Thailand
- Anisomeles carpentarica A.R.Bean - Northern Territory, Queensland
- Anisomeles eriodes A.R.Bean - Queensland
- Anisomeles farinacea A.R.Bean - Northern Territory, Western Australia
- Anisomeles grandibracteata A.R.Bean - Northern Territory
- Anisomeles indica (L.) Kuntze - China, Tibet, Himalayas, India, Bangladesh, Nepal, Sri Lanka, Maldive Islands, Lakshadweep, Andaman & Nicobar Islands, Indochina, Malaysia, Indonesia, Philippines, New Guinea, Christmas Island, Bismarck Archipelago, Mauritius, Madagascar; naturalized in Fiji, Samoa, Jamaica, Trinidad
- Anisomeles inodora R.Br. - Northern Territory, Queensland, Western Australia
- Anisomeles languida A.R.Bean - Queensland
- Anisomeles leucotricha A.R.Bean - Northern Territory
- Anisomeles macdonaldii A.R.Bean - Queensland
- Anisomeles malabarica (L.) R.Br. ex Sims - India, Bangladesh, Sri Lanka, Andaman & Nicobar Islands, Thailand, Malaysia, Indonesia, New Guinea, Bismarck Archipelago, Mauritius, Réunion, northern Australia
- Anisomeles ornans A.R.Bean - Queensland
- Anisomeles papuana A.R.Bean - Bismarck Archipelago, Maluku, New Guinea, Queensland
- Anisomeles principis A.R.Bean - Lesser Sunda Is., Western Australia
- Anisomeles tirunelveliensis Rajakumar, Selvak. & S.Murug. - India
- Anisomeles viscidula A.R.Bean - Northern Territory, Western Australia
- Anisomeles vulpina A.R.Bean - Queensland
- Anisomeles × intermedia Wight ex Benth. - India
