= Wild edible and medicinal plants of British Columbia =

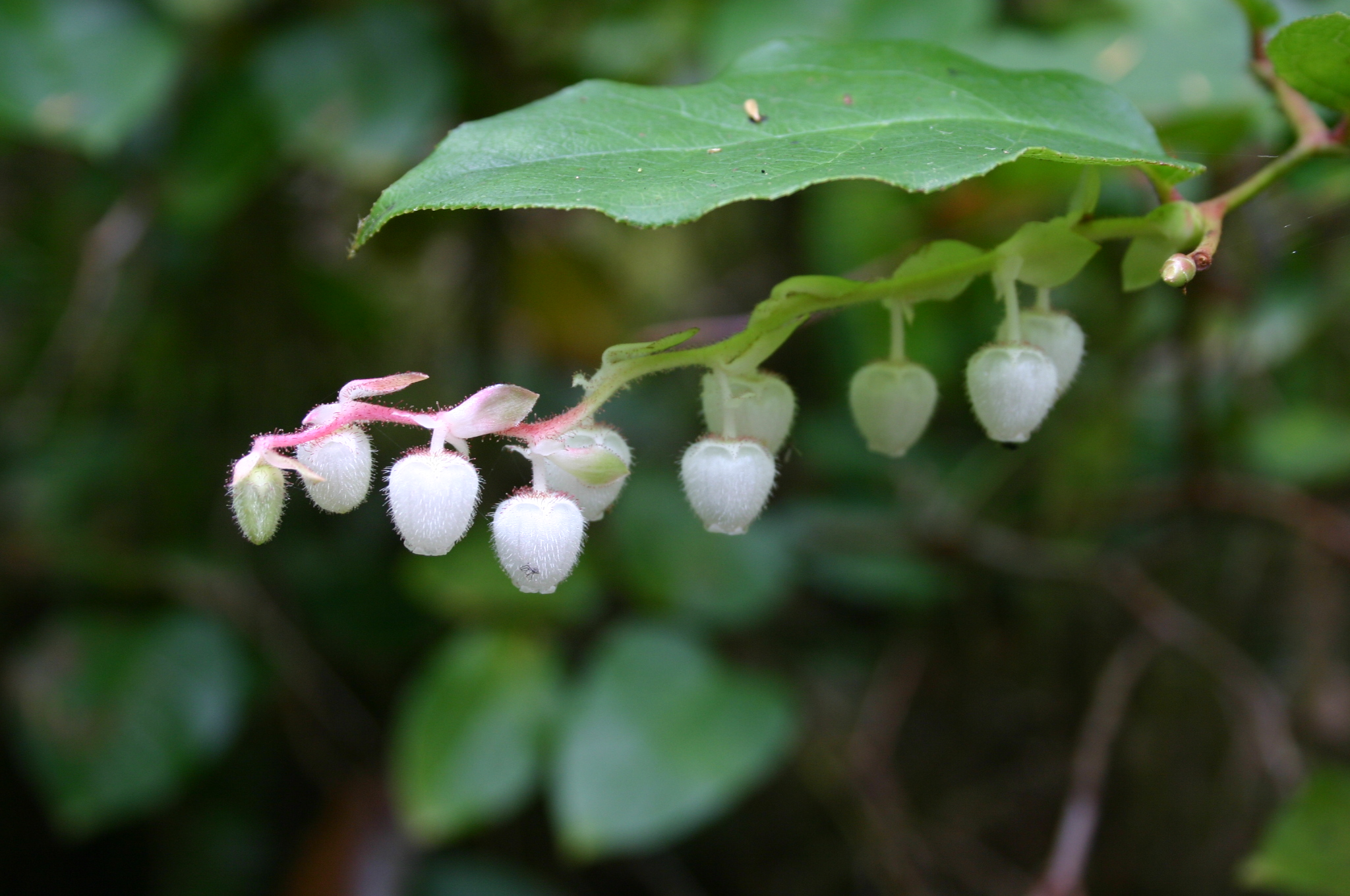
Salal berries are a fruit on the British Columbia Coast.

Approximately 100 species of wild edible and medicinal plants in British Columbia were harvested traditionally by First Nations peoples. These include seaweeds, rhizomes and shoots of flowering plants, berries, and fungi.

== History ==
Plants and fungi have long played a central role in the cultures of many First Nations communities. They have been used to provide food, shelter, tools, medicines, clothing, and ceremonial items, forming an essential foundation of daily life and cultural practice.

For thousands of years indigenous peoples held sovereignty over their food systems. Edible features of culturally valued food plants in British Columbia contributed to First Nations diets before territories were colonized. However, the use of traditional food has dropped precipitously over the past 150 years.

A number of ongoing concerns affect their use and protection. These include the impacts of industrial and resource development activities on the availability and safety of traditional food and medicinal species, as well as the effects of environmental change on ecosystems. Additional issues involve the commercialization of traditional foods and medicines and the protection of intellectual property rights related to traditional knowledge.

== Seaweed ==
Seaweed has been an important plant for many First Nations peoples of British Columbia. Along the coast, families still travel out to seaweed beds that have provided food for thousands of years. Dried red laver (Porphyra abbottiae Krishnamurthy) is a type of edible seaweed. Laver is usually gathered in great amounts in Spring. It has been used traditionally by virtually all the coastal groups, with the possible exception of some Nuu-chah-nulth, or Westcoast peoples, and some Salishan peoples of Vancouver Island, and various species have been used. Seaweed is harvested at its young growing stage in the spring, usually around May, with the exact time depending on latitude, local conditions, and type of laver. Older plants are too tough to be eaten.

Traditionally, women were seaweed harvesters. Working from canoes, women would pull seaweed from the rocks until their canoes were full. At the beach it would be piled up, covered with mats and then finally dried on cedarwood frames, where is would hang to dry for 2–3 days. Sometimes it would be hung out for only one day, and then moved to the smokehouse for the remaining time. Lightly smoked, it was found to take on a unique flavor.

The Kwakwaka'wakw (Kwakwala speaking villages), for example, traditionally prepared cakes of red laver by covering the harvested seaweed and allowing it to decompose for 4–5 days, then pressing it into wood frames and drying it in the sun. The resulting cakes were then placed in cedar-wood boxes in layers alternating with layers of chiton juice (obtained by chewing the chiton and spitting out the saliva) and young boughs of red-cedar (Thuja plicata). When the box was filled, it was weighted with several large rocks, tied down with rope, and left for about a month. Then the entire process was repeated, altogether four times. Finally, the cakes were packed in a box without cedar boughs and stored for winter, when they were eaten with smoked salmon at tribal feasts. Kwakwaka'wakw sometimes dried and toasted individual sheets of the seaweed on a rack over the fire, then powdered it and boiled it with water.

The Haida used a similar method, leaving piles of the harvested seaweed to ferment for a few days before drying it. Dried seaweed cakes were chopped or shredded into pieces, then boiled or used in soups and stews.

The simplest method of curing the seaweed, most commonly used at present, is to spread it out on rocks in the sun. When dry, it is broken into small pieces and stored. It is then eaten dry, as a snack, or cooked in a variety of dishes. It is commonly mixed or cooked with eulachon oil, halibut heads, clams, fat of deer, bear or seal, or with salmon or salmon eggs. One contemporary innovation is creamed corn with seaweed. Dried seaweed is a common trade item among various families and communities.

== Roots, sprouts, leaves, and rhizomes ==
Traditionally, root vegetables held a very high status in First Nations food systems. Root vegetables were important for food, ceremonial and economic reasons. Some nations held a First Roots ceremony to show respect for the roots before the community went digging for their needs. Roots were dried in large quantities, traded from one place to another and were kept as a "back-up" in times of food shortage. Traditionally, for the Kwakwaka'wakw village of Haada, trade in root vegetables (springbank clover (Trifolium wormskioldii), silverweed and northern riceroot (Fritillaria camschatcensis) with the Nuxalk and Heiltsuk was an important part of their regional economy.

Yellow Glacier Lily (Erythronium grandiflorum) and Balsamroot (Balsamorhiza sagittata) are two crops that were used extensively by indigenous peoples in south-central British Columbia. For example, during the summer months, St'at'imc, Nlaka'pamux and Secwepemc women would dig the corms. Families would gather upwards of 2,000 pounds (910 kg). Recent archaeological investigations of prehistoric root collecting and processing sites suggest pitcooking practices were in use at least 2500 years ago. In the spring, the root crown, young leafstalks, and bud stems of balsamroot were eaten as fresh greens, and in the fall, the seeds were collected and pounded into a flour and eaten as a porridge.

In addition, for Coast Salish society, the significance of Camas extended well beyond a staple food, it was also a cultural keystone species. Access to and the use of camas by Interior communities was made possible through trade from the peoples of what is now northern Washington. Large camas beds on southern Vancouver Island and the Gulf Islands were kept free of invading plants through regular clearing and burning.

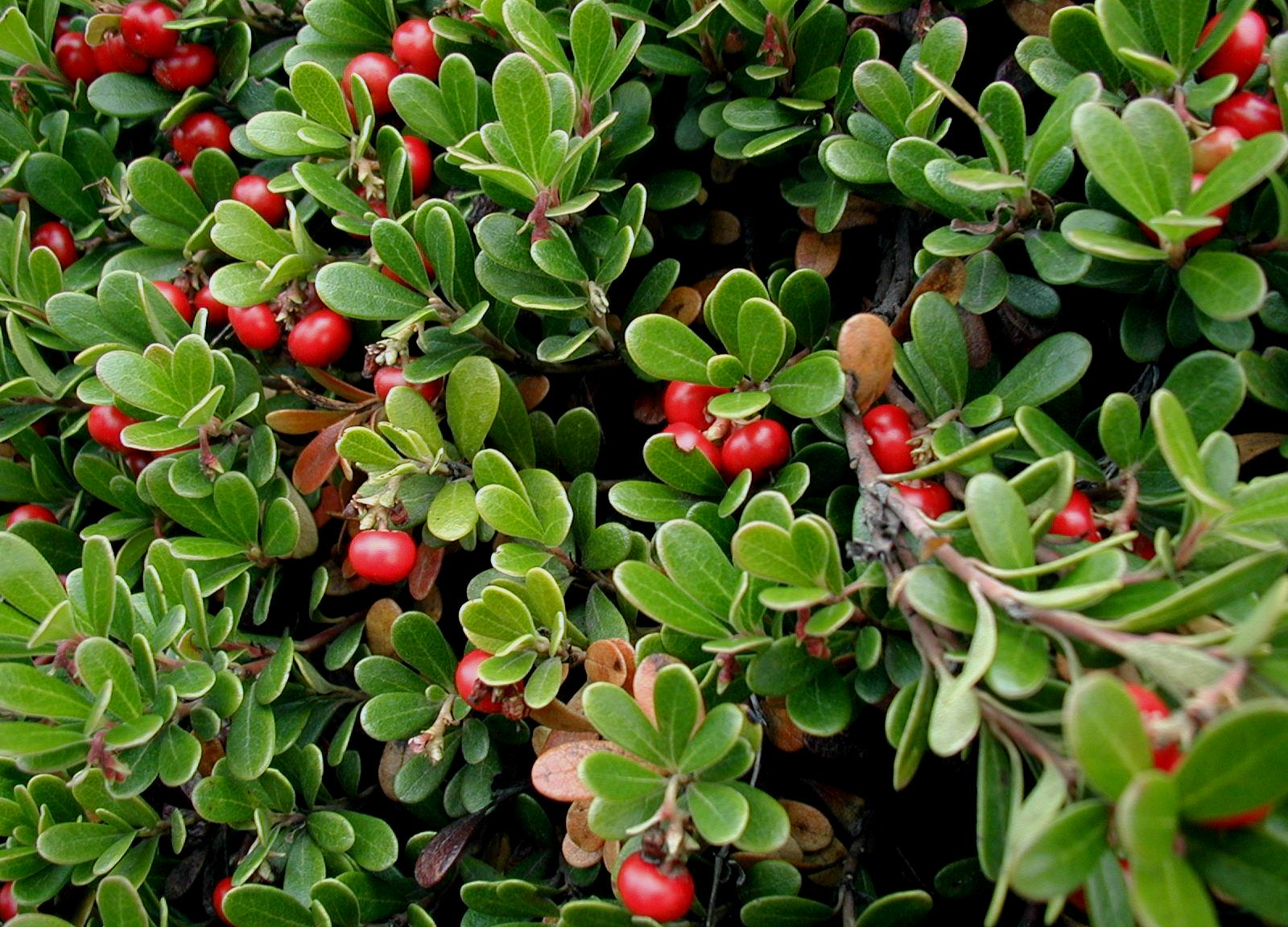
Kinnikinnick (bearberry) leaves and berries

== Berries ==
For thousands of years, berry-producing plants have been important species harvested in traditional territories of British Columbia. From early summer (soapberries, salmonberries, thimbleberries), to late fall (cranberries, crabapples), depending on the berry type and location.

Berries were an important part of traditional knowledge, phenological events used to signal the onset of berry ripening include life cycle changes in invertebrates, vertebrates, and plants, but predominantly incorporate the flowering or fruiting phenology of a second plant species. The wild rose blooming announced the readiness of sxusem (soapberries) for Nlaka'pamux. The song of Swainson's thrush heralded the ripening of salmonberries for Tlingit, Tsimshian, Haida, Haisla, Oweekeno, Squamish, Nuu-chah-nulth, Ditidaht, and Northern Straits Salish people.

Soapberries hold a high place and have a lasting taste memory. Saponins in the soapberries allow them to be whipped up into a frothy 'ice cream' which was traditionally eaten in British Columbia. So-called 'Indian' ice cream has often been mixed in with dried meat, or may be served alone. Soapberries have been mixed with sugar and added to carbonated water as an alternative to pop. Berries contain vitamin C, fibre, and carbohydrates.

Berries traditionally harvested on the north coast include bunchberries, blueberries, cloudberries, cranberries, crowberries (mossberries), currant, gooseberry, blue elderberry, red huckleberry, salmonberry, thimbleberries (Rubus parviflorus), black hawthorn (jam/jelly), crabapple (jam/jelly), oregon grape (jam/jelly), soapberries, and strawberry.

South coast berries include cranberries, red huckleberries, salmonberries, thimbleberries, oregon grape (jam/jelly), cherries, currants, blackberries, gooseberries, soapberries, and strawberries.

In the southern interior, blueberries, cranberries, currants, blue huckleberries/bilberry (Vaccinium deliciosum), blue elderberry, soapberries, black raspberry, and strawberries have been harvested. In the northern interior, blueberries, cranberries, blue huckleberries/bilberry, crowberries (mossberry), currants, bunchberries, saskatoons, and cloudberries have been harvested.

== Fungi ==
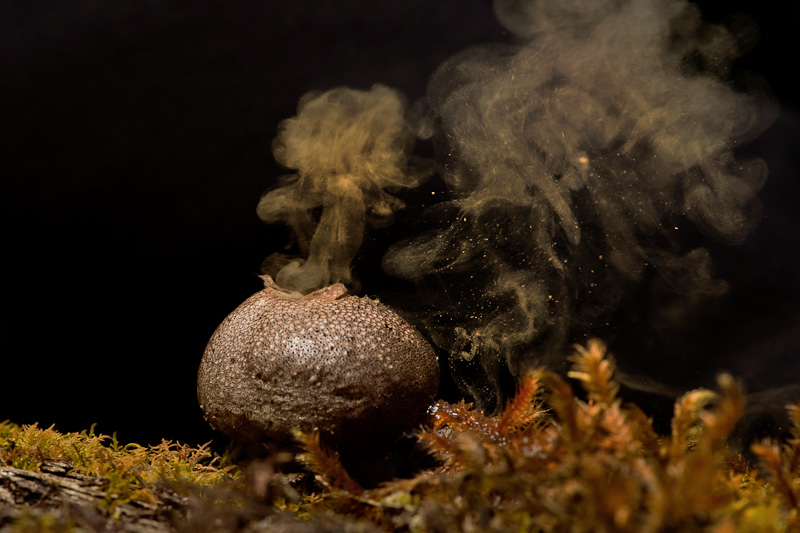
Puffball mushroom releasing spores. In the Sechelt language, Shashishalhem (/ʃáʃíʃáɬəm/), their name translates as "star-excrement".

Among the Northwest Coast peoples, despite the availability of innumerable kinds of edible mushrooms, few were recognized with names, and with some minor exceptions, few were eaten. In some coastal languages, such as Haida, there does not appear to have been even a general name for "mushroom." In the Nuxalk (Bella Coola) language, the name for mushrooms means "hats-on-the-ground". Sometimes 'puffballs' are associated with stars. In the Sechelt (Shishalh) language, Shashishalhem (Sechelt pronunciation: [/ʃáʃíʃáɬəm/]), for example, their name translates as "star-excrement". In other areas, such as Nlaka'pamux (Thompson) Interior Salish, puffballs are associated with ghosts and corpses. Puffballs and some tree fungi (polypores) were used medicinally by Interior Salish and other peoples. In addition, the Interior Salish did eat approximately six different types of mushrooms traditionally and some Chilcotin people were said to eat certain types.

Within British Columbia, traditional perceptions about the edibility of mushrooms vary greatly. Furthermore, even when the edibility of mushrooms is established, there are few records about how they are harvested, processed, and consumed. The Nlaka’pamux and Stʼatʼimc recognized a whole class of “bad mushrooms” including at least one type called “holein-the-top”, a Lactarius species (tentatively, L. resimus). It was said that if one ate this, (his) stomach would "swell up"; the only cure was to eat bear's grease.

Studies of edible mushrooms in the Interior Salish area of British Columbia have resulted in the collection and verification by mycologists of four traditionally used species: Cottonwood mushroom (Tricholoma populinum), Oyster Mushroom (Pleurotus ostreatus; including P. sapidus), Pine mushroom (Tricholoma magnivelare) and Red Waxy Cap/Larch Waxy Cap (Hygrophorus speciosus).

Other varieties eaten by B.C. First Nations peoples include: Chanterelle (Cantharellus cibarius), Shelf Fungus (Ganoderma applanatum), Slippery-top (Hygrophorus gliocyclus), Morel (Morchella spp.) Jelly fungus (Tremella mesenterica) and St. George's mushroom (Tricholoma gambosum).

=== Traditional Wild Mushrooms ===
A list of 'safe' wild mushrooms of British Columbia include:

- apricot jelly mushroom
- bear's head tooth mushroom
- black mole
- blue chanterelle
- cauliflower mushroom
- chicken of the woods
- comb tooth mushroom
- common puffball
- fairy ring mushroom
- golden chanterelle (aka chanterelle)
- hedgehog mushroom
- hexagonal-pored polypore
- horn of plenty (aka black chanterelle, black trumpet)
- horse mushroom
- ink cap
- jelly ear (aka wood ear)
- king bolete (aka cepe)
- larch bolete
- lion's mane
- lobster mushroom
- meadow mushroom
- mica cap
- oyster mushroom
- red cracked bolete
- rosy gomphidius
- saffron milk cap
- scaly hedgehog
- shaggy mane
- slimy spike cap
- western giant puffball
- yellow swamp russula
- yellow-gilled russula

== Traditionally Harvested Plants ==
Traditionally harvested plants by First Nations peoples in British Columbia. The most commonly harvested plants include:

- Red laver
- Nodding Onion (allium cernuum Roth)
- Blue Camas (camassia quamash Greene)
- Chocolate Lily (Fritillaria lanceolata Pursh Fritillaria affinis)
- Bog Cranberry
- Yerba buena
- Cow Parsnip (Heracleum maximum)
- Wild Hazelnuts (Corylus cornuta)
- Red Elderberry (Sambucus racemosa)
- High Bush Cranberry (Viburnum edule)
- Soapberries (Shepherdia canadensis)
- Kinnikinnick (Bearberry, Arctostaphylos ova-ursi)
- Salal (Gaultheria shallon)
- Mountain Bilberry (Vaccinium membranaceum)
- Canada Blueberry (Vaccinium myrtilloides)
- Oval Blueberry (Vaccinium ovalifolium)
- Evergreen Huckleberry (Vaccinium ovatum)
- Red Huckleberry (Vaccinium parvifolium)
- Nettle (Urtica dioica)
- Springbank Clover (Trifolium wormskioldii)
- Wapato (Sagittaria latifolia)
- Stink Current (Ribes bracteosum)
- Coast Black Gooseberry (Ribes divaricatum)
- Saskatoon Berry (Amelanchier alnifolia)
- Coastal Strawberry (Fragaria chiloensis)
- Pacific Silverweed
- Wild Crabapple (Malus fusca)
- Salmonberries (Rubus spectabilis).
