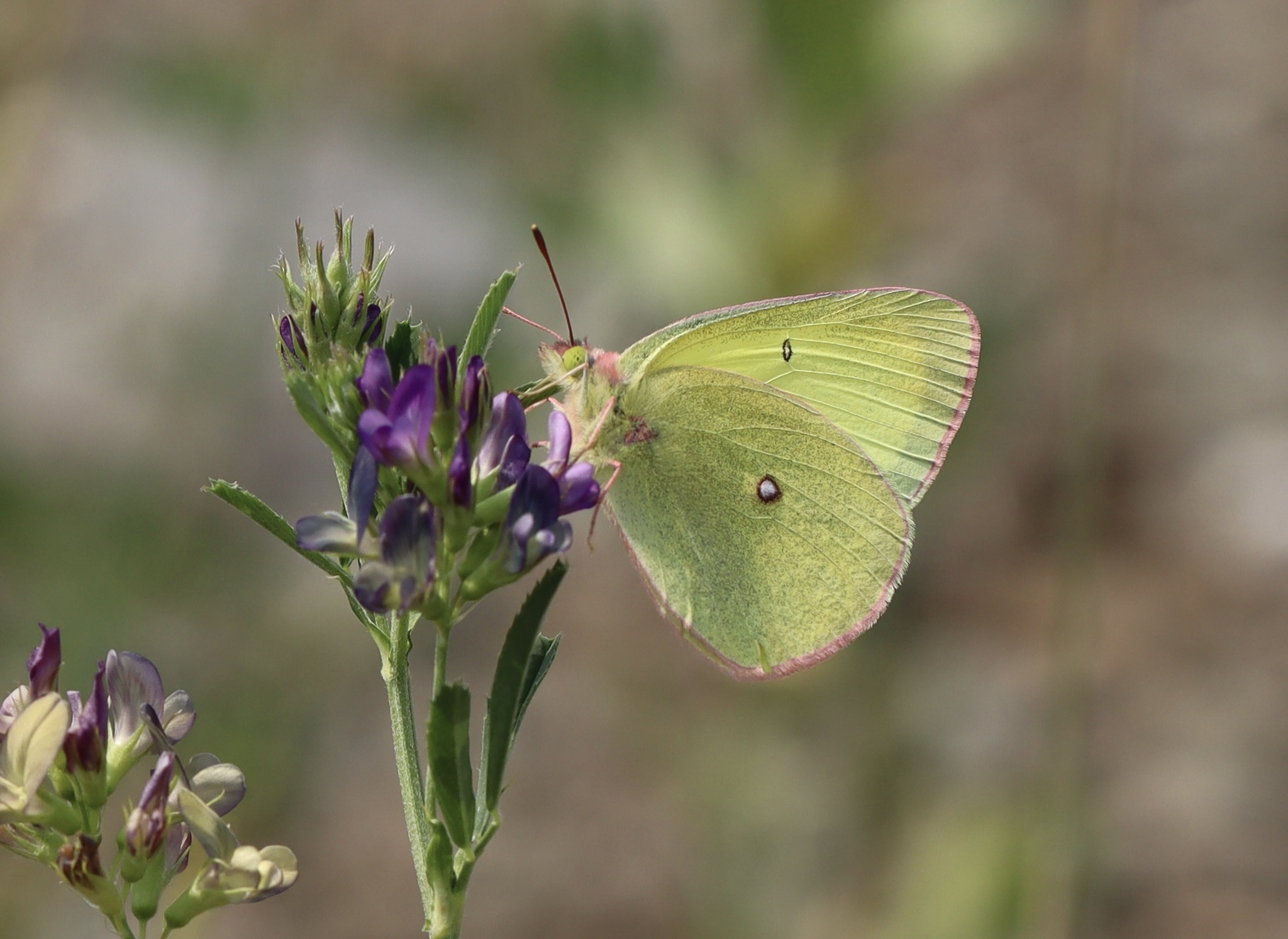
- Pink-edged sulphur on a purple flower

Conservation status
- Secure (NatureServe)

Scientific classification
- Kingdom: Animalia
- Phylum: Arthropoda
- Clade: Pancrustacea
- Class: Insecta
- Order: Lepidoptera
- Family: Pieridae
- Genus: Colias
- Species: C. interior

Binomial name
- Colias interior (Scudder, 1862)
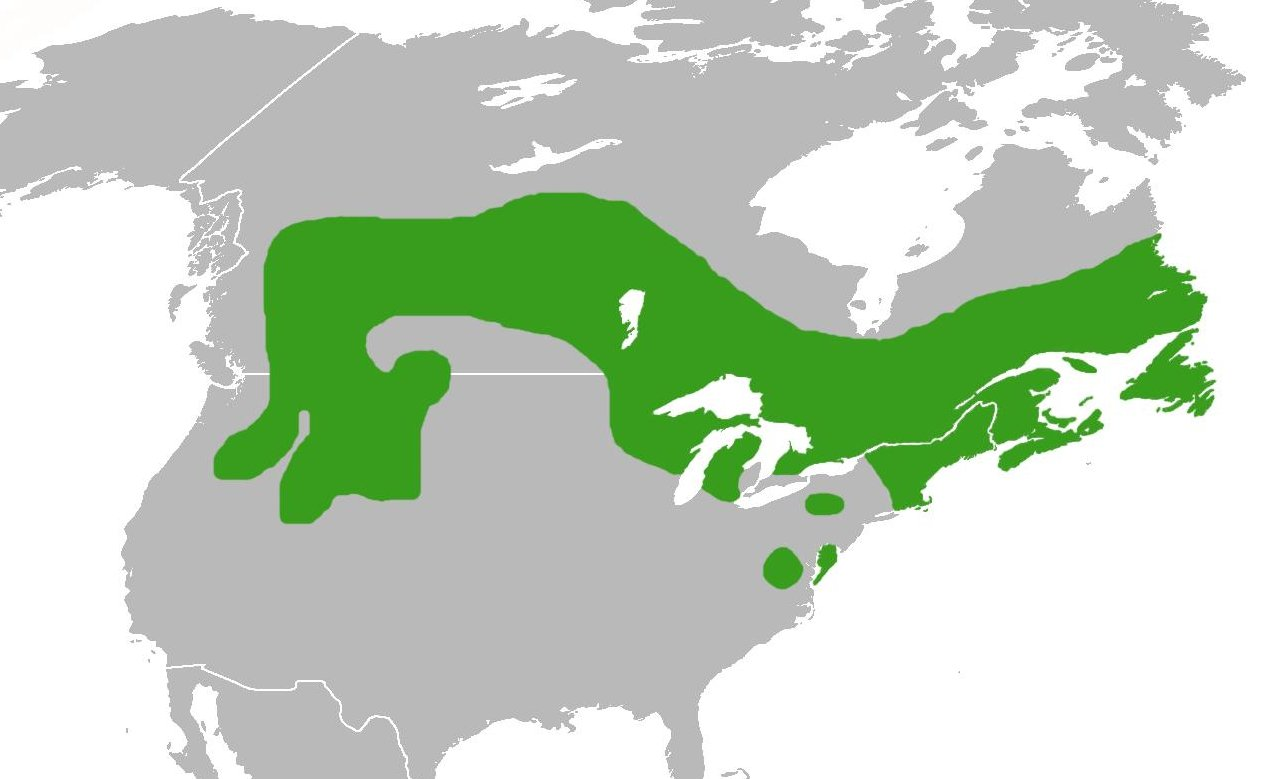

= Colias interior =

Species of butterfly

Colias interior, the pink-edged sulphur, is a species of North American butterfly in the family Pieridae. It is the State Butterfly of Maine.

== Description ==
This species is a yellow butterfly with black marginal borders, which are reduced in females. The hindwing has one central spot, and the wing edges are pink. Black marginal spots are absent. The wingspan for this butterfly is 39 to 66 mm. Males are not ultraviolet.

== Habitat and distribution ==
Canadian to Hudsonian life zone with shrubby forest openings. The species ranges across southern Canada and parts of the northern United States (see range map).

== Life cycle ==
There is one flight between June and August. The adult female lays eggs on blueberry plants.

=== Larval foods ===
- Vaccinium: Vaccinium myrtilloides, V. cespitosum, V. angustifolium, and possibly V. crassifolium and V. vacillans.

=== Adult foods ===
- Aralia hispida
- Pilosella aurantiaca
