= Huckleberry pie =

Pie with a huckleberry filling

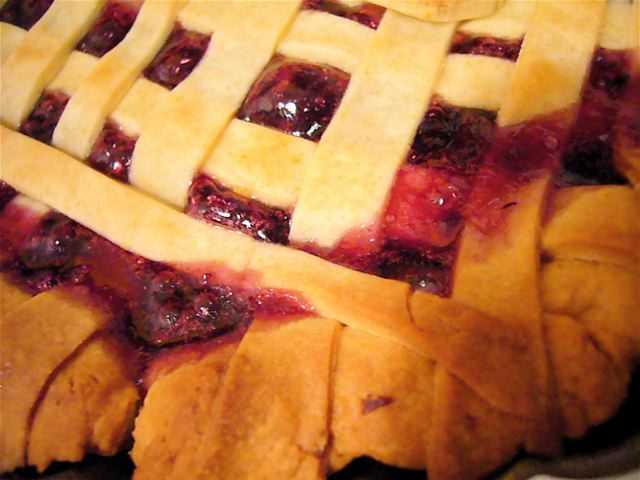
- Type: Pie
- Course: Dessert
- Place of origin: United States
- Main ingredients: Huckleberries

Huckleberry pie is a pie with a huckleberry filling.

== History ==
The pie has Native American origins.
