= Berry-picking rake =

Hand tool for harvesting berries

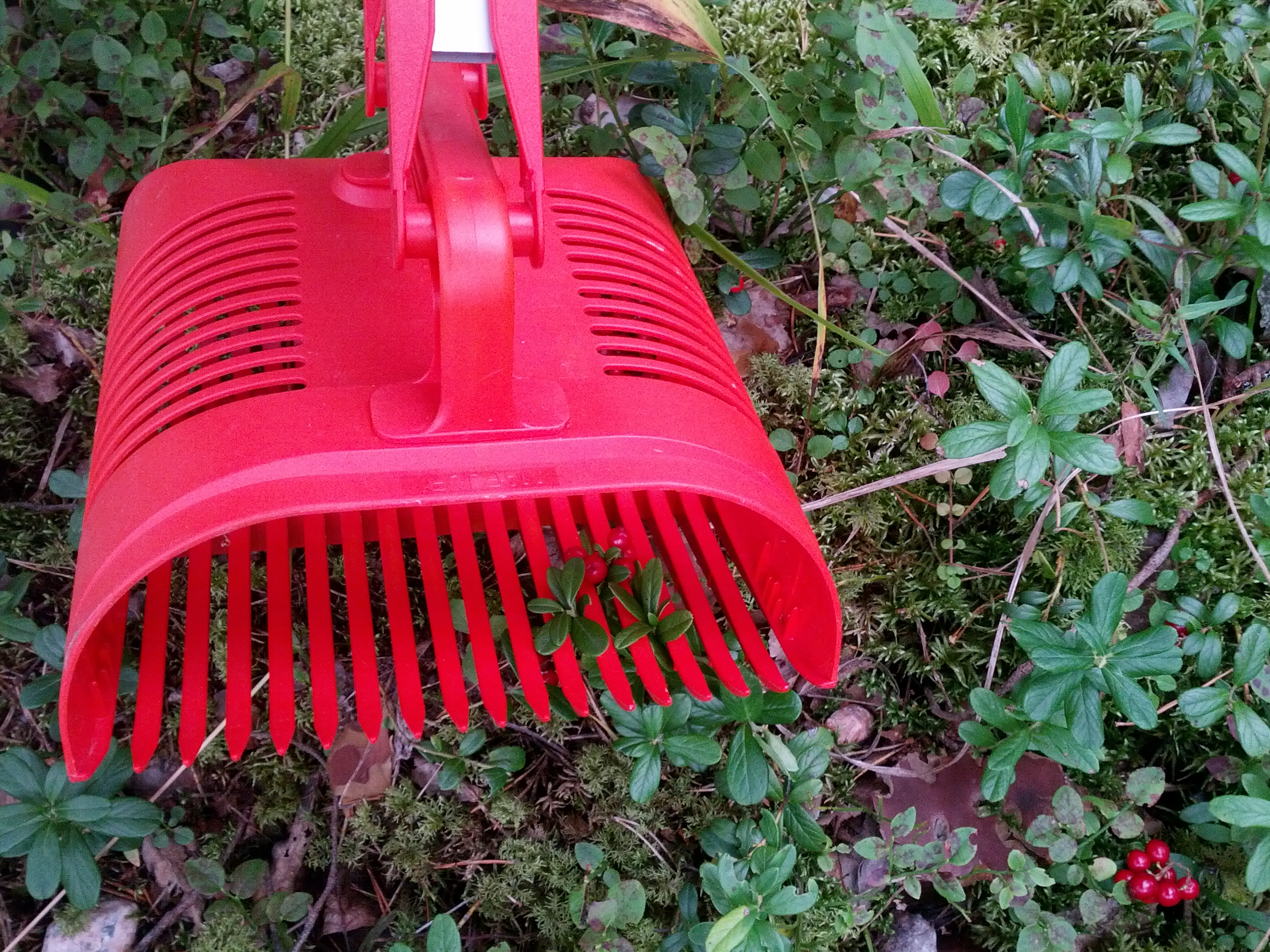
A berry-picking rake, collecting lingonberries

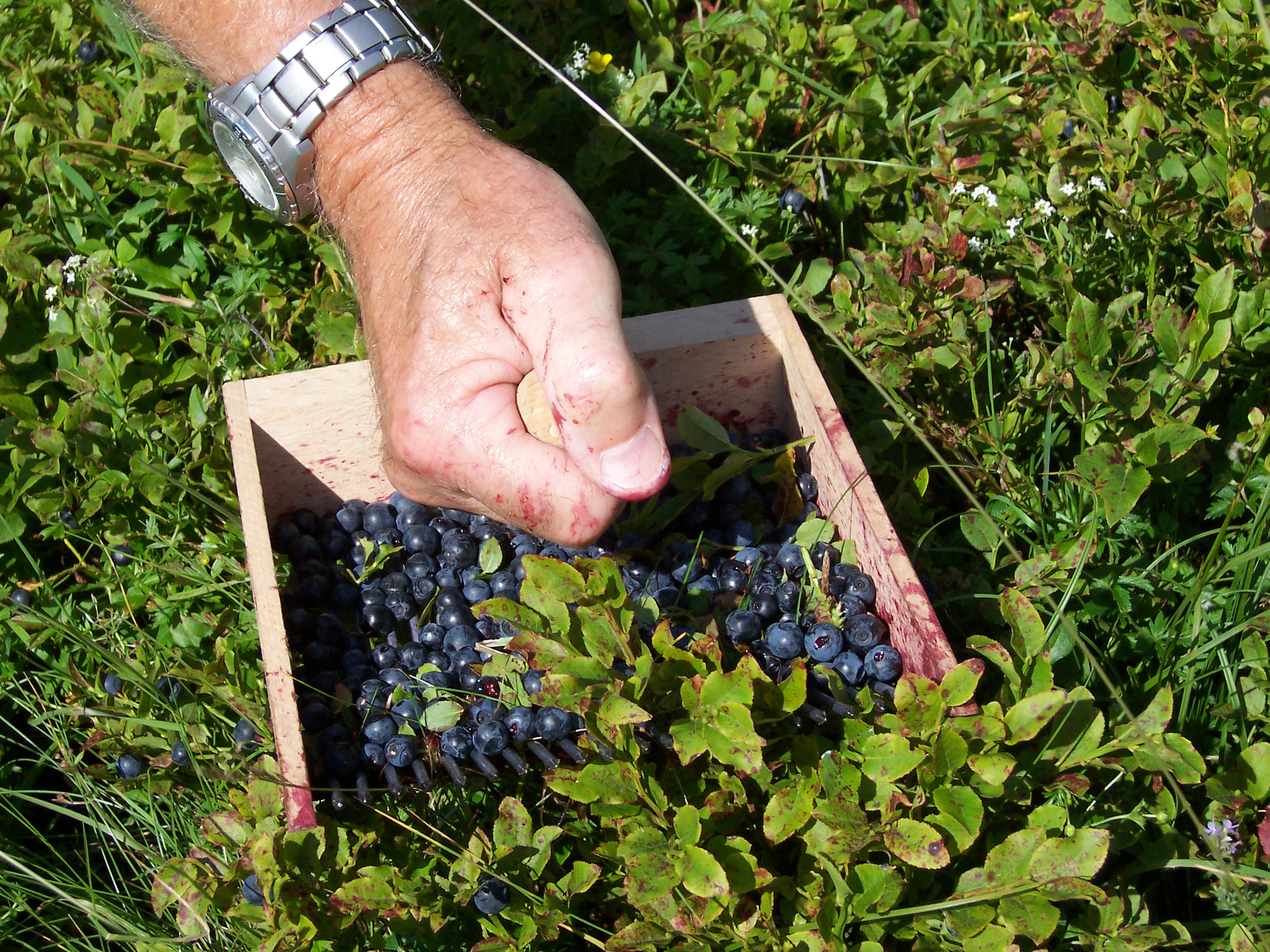
Bilberries being collected with a berry-picking rake in the Massif central

A berry-picking rake or berry picker is a tool for collecting berries. Berry-picking rakes can be used to collect lingonberries, bilberries, currants, and other berries. The rake may damage softer berries, and introduces some detritus, requiring cleaning of the berries afterwards. If misused, it may also damage or uproot the plants, reducing next year's yields. Despite these drawbacks, a rake has much greater efficiency than picking by hand and is thus used in all commercial berry picking - though modern large-scale farms use mechanical harvesters.

One model of a berry picking rake was patented by J.O. Wennborg of Habo, Sweden.
