= Bilberry =

Species of shrub with edible berries

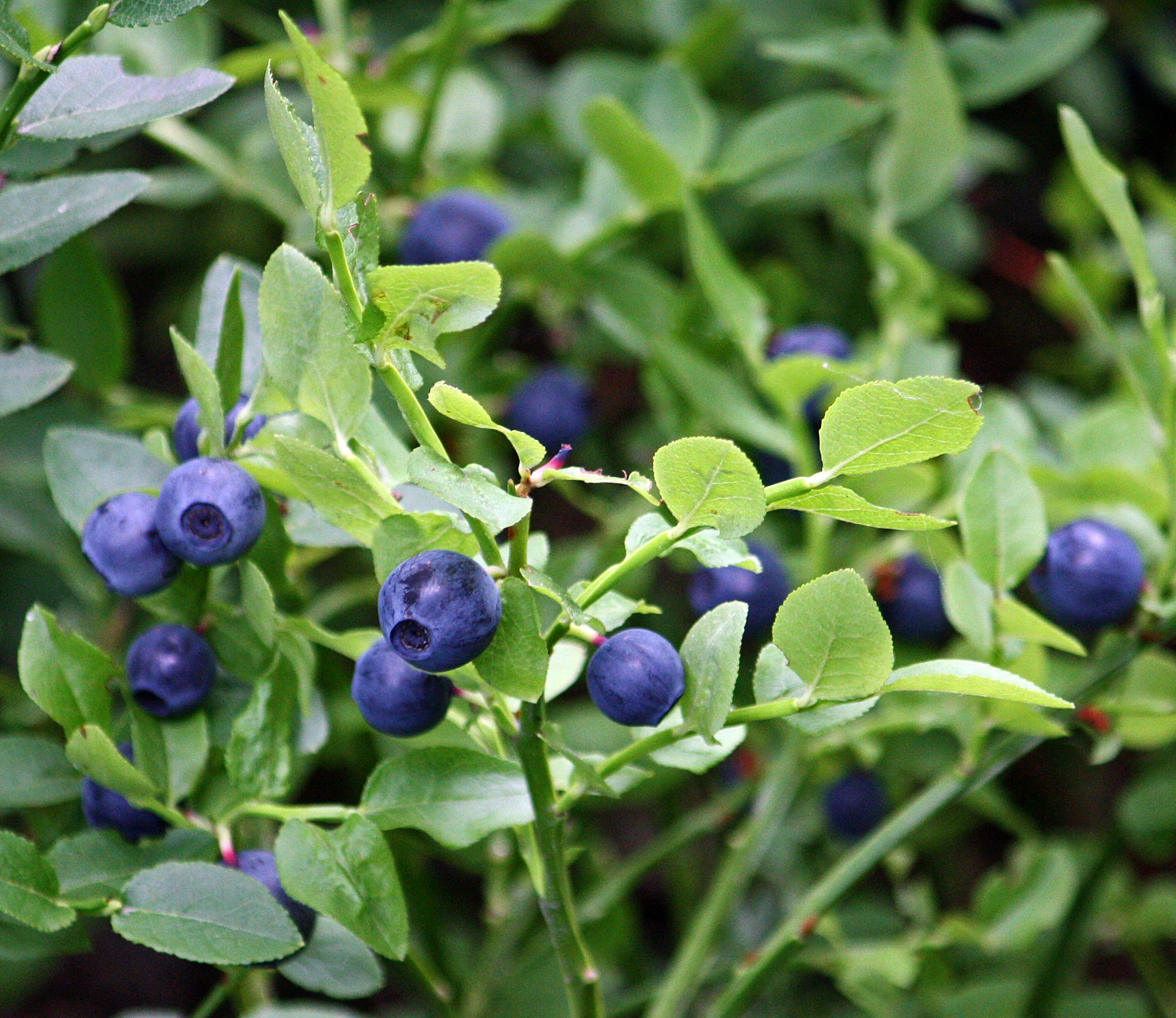
Bilberries

Bilberry (/ˈbɪlbəri/), also known as European blueberry, is a Eurasian low-growing shrub in the genus Vaccinium of the flowering plant family Ericaceae. Vaccinium myrtillus L. is the species most commonly called bilberry, but other closely related Vaccinium species may also have this name.

Bilberries, which are native to Europe, are different from North American blueberries, although the species are closely related and belong to the same genus, Vaccinium; they produce edible, dark blue berries. The dark blue colour of bilberries derives from the high content of anthocyanins.

Well known in folklore, bilberry extracts and dried powders are sold as dietary supplements promoted mainly for eye disorders, although there is no substantial clinical evidence that consuming bilberry fruit or its preparations provides any health benefits.

== Etymology and regional names ==
The name "bilberry" appears to have a Scandinavian origin, possibly from as early as 1577, while the earliest known English use of the name "blueberry" dates back to 1594, appearing in the Acts of Parliament of Scotland. The name "bilberry" is similar to the Danish word bølle for whortleberry with the addition of "berry". In Scandinavian languages, terms for bilberries have names with the meaning "blueberry", such as blåbär in Swedish and blåbær in Danish and Norwegian.

The bilberry (especially Vaccinium myrtillus) may be called blaeberry /ˈbleɪbɛri/ in Scottish and Northern English regional dialects, whortleberry /ˈhwɜːrtəbri/ in southern England, and fraochán in Ireland.

== Description ==
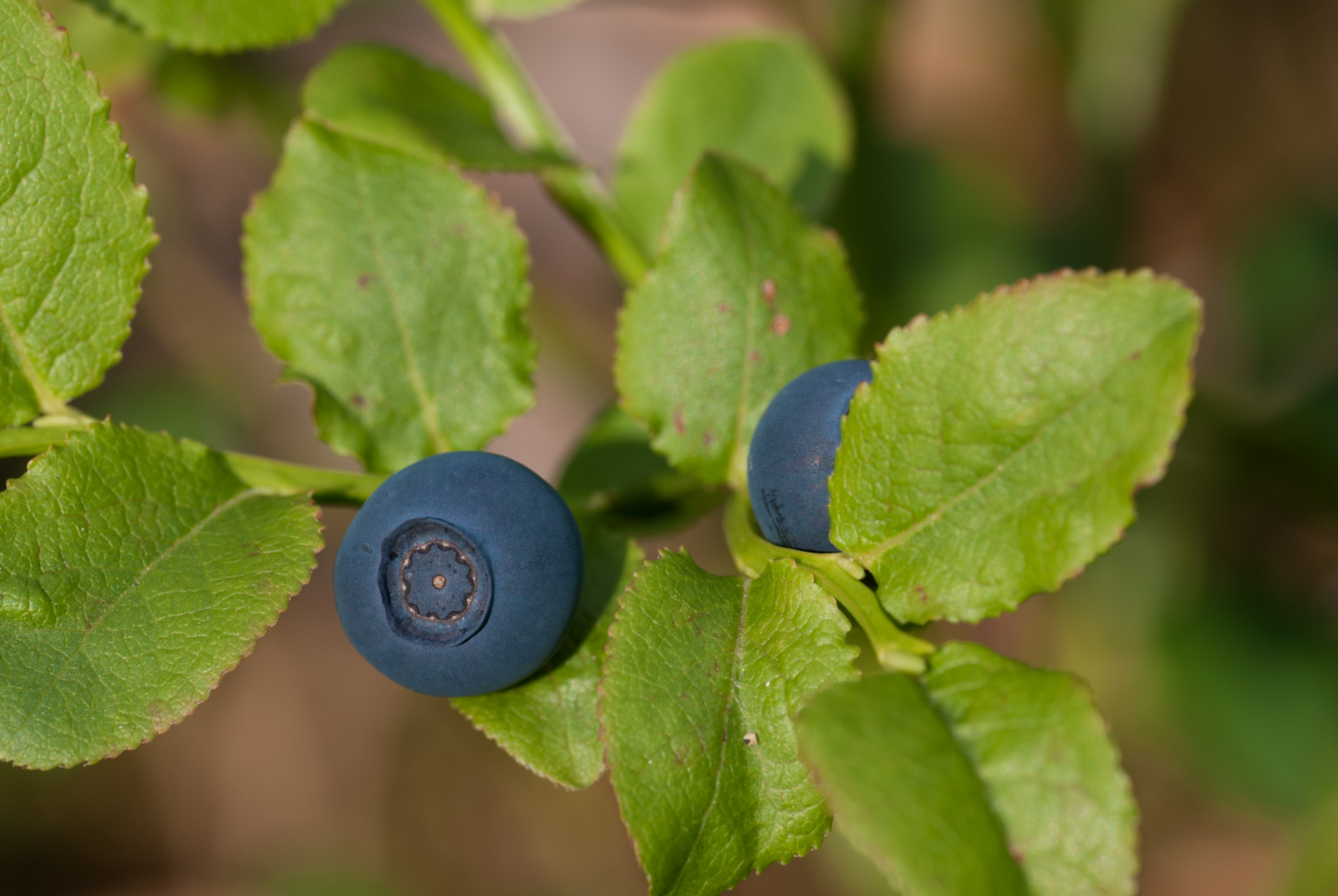
Ripe bilberry and leaves

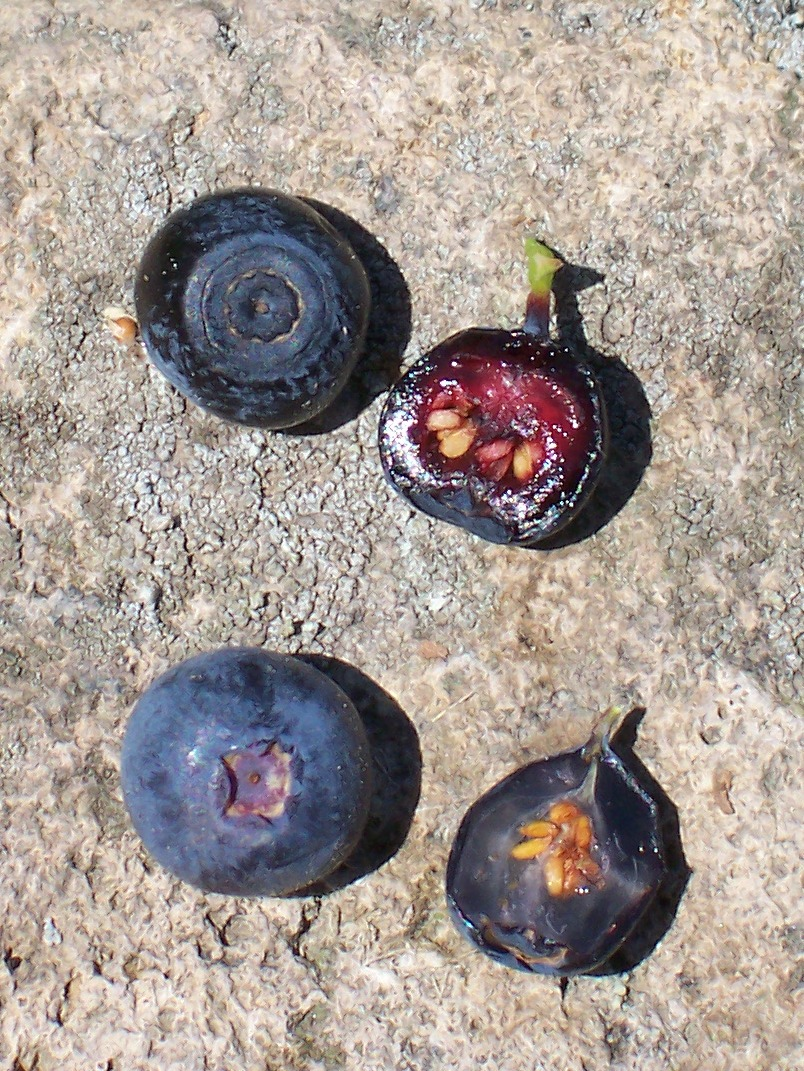
The interiors of bilberries (top) have dark-coloured flesh, while bog bilberries (bottom) have pale flesh.

Bilberries are non-climacteric berries with a smooth, circular outline at the end opposite the stalk, whereas American blueberries retain persistent sepals there, leaving a rough, star-shaped pattern of five flaps. Bilberries grow singly or in pairs rather than in clusters, as American blueberries do, and American blueberries have more evergreen leaves. Bilberries are dark in colour, and often appear near black with a slight shade of purple.

=== Phytochemicals ===
Bilberries contain diverse polyphenols, including tannins, organic acids, phenolic acids, and anthocyanins, specifically anthocyanidins as delphinidin and cyanidin glycosides. V. myrtillus bilberry pulp is red or purple, and V. uliginosum bog bilberry pulp is pale-coloured. The high anthocyanin content of V. myrtillus may cause staining of the fingers, lips, and tongue. The anthocyanin content of bilberries and bilberry juice may exceed the levels seen in blueberries and blueberry juice.

== White-fruited bilberries ==
Rare white-fruited bilberries growing naturally in Hirvensalmi, Finland.

A rare, naturally occurring white-fruited form of Vaccinium myrtillus has been documented in Finland. Unlike typical bilberries, which develop a dark blue or nearly black colour due to anthocyanin pigments, these berries remain white when ripe. The unusual colouration is associated with a hereditary alteration affecting anthocyanin production. The plants otherwise resemble ordinary bilberries, and the berries have been reported to have a similar taste. White-fruited bilberries may form distinct patches through vegetative reproduction by underground rhizomes, with the shoots in a patch belonging to the same genetic individual.

== Species ==
The term bilberries can describe several closely related species, which (except for V. uliginosum) are part of section Myrtillus:

- Vaccinium myrtillus L. (bilberry)
- Vaccinium uliginosum L. (bog bilberry, bog blueberry, bog whortleberry, bog huckleberry, northern bilberry, ground hurts)
- Vaccinium cespitosum Michx. (dwarf bilberry)
- Vaccinium deliciosum Piper (Cascade bilberry)
- Vaccinium membranaceum (mountain bilberry, black mountain huckleberry, black huckleberry, twin-leaved huckleberry)
- Vaccinium ovalifolium (oval-leafed blueberry, oval-leaved bilberry, mountain blueberry, high-bush blueberry).

== Ecology ==
Bilberry plants can suffer from bilberry blight, caused by Phytophthora kernoviae. There have been severe outbreaks in Staffordshire, England.

Bilberry is used as a food plant by the larvae of some Lepidoptera species.

== Harvesting ==
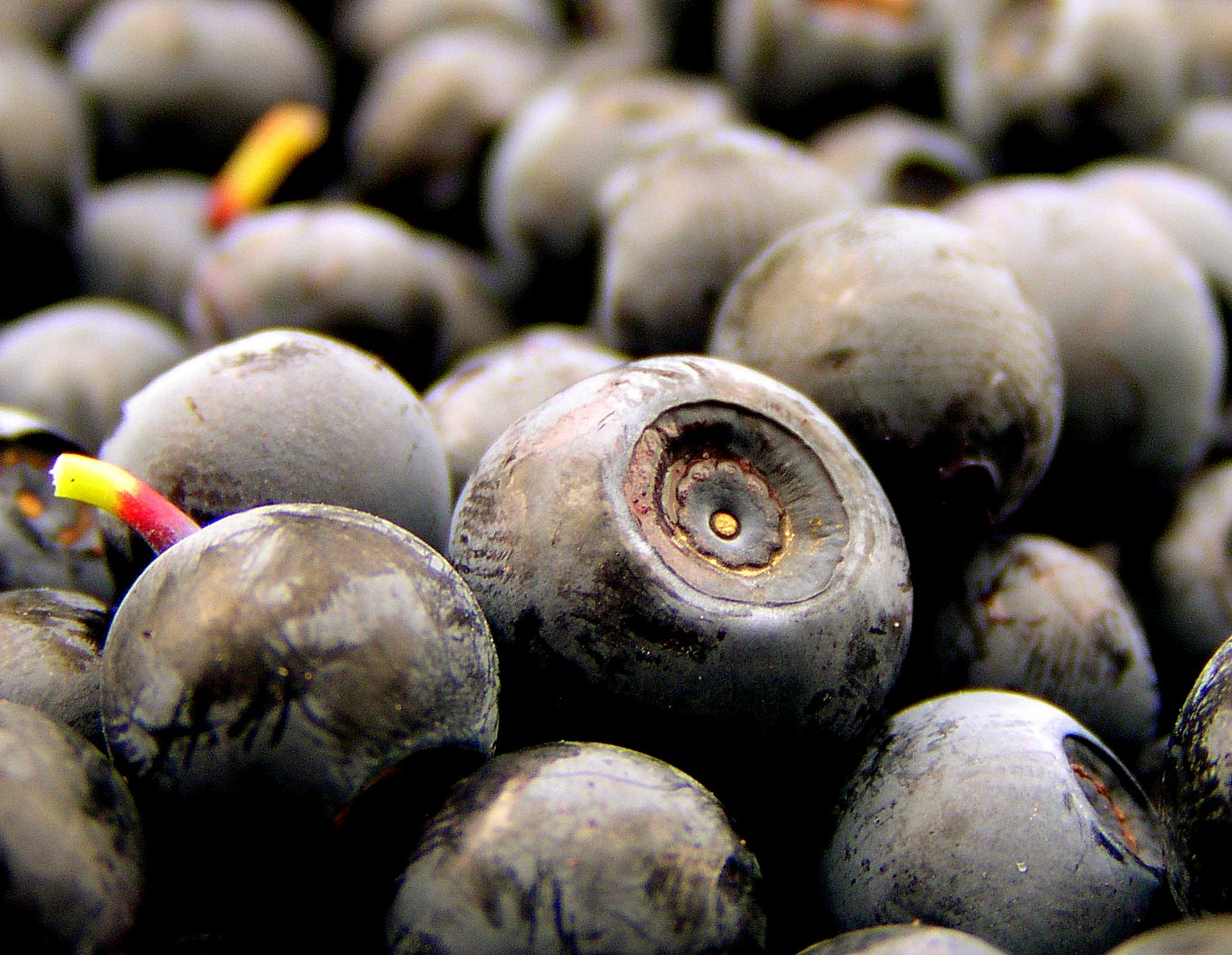
Closeup of bilberries

Bilberries are found in acidic, nutrient-poor soils throughout the temperate and subarctic regions of the world. Because they are difficult to grow and the fruit is small, bilberries are seldom cultivated. Fruits are mostly collected from wild plants growing on publicly accessible lands throughout northern and central Europe where they are plentiful; for example, bilberries occur on about 17% of the land area of Sweden, where the berry is called blåbär (lit. "blueberry", which is a source of confusion with the North American blueberry). Bilberries can be picked by a berry-picking rake like lingonberries, but are more susceptible to damage.

In Iceland, bilberries (known as aðalbláber, or "prime blueberry") grow predominantly in Westfjords and the surrounding area. In most of the country, the subtype bog blueberry occupies the same habitat. Both species are commonly found growing with dwarf birch and crowberries. Wild growth is vast compared to the population of Iceland and wild harvesting is legal, and a common activity in August when the berry season peaks.

In Ireland, bilberries (known as fraochán) were traditionally gathered on the last Sunday in July, known as Bilberry Sunday, for the Celtic harvest festival of Lughnasadh, which marked the end of the hungry month of July.

== Uses ==
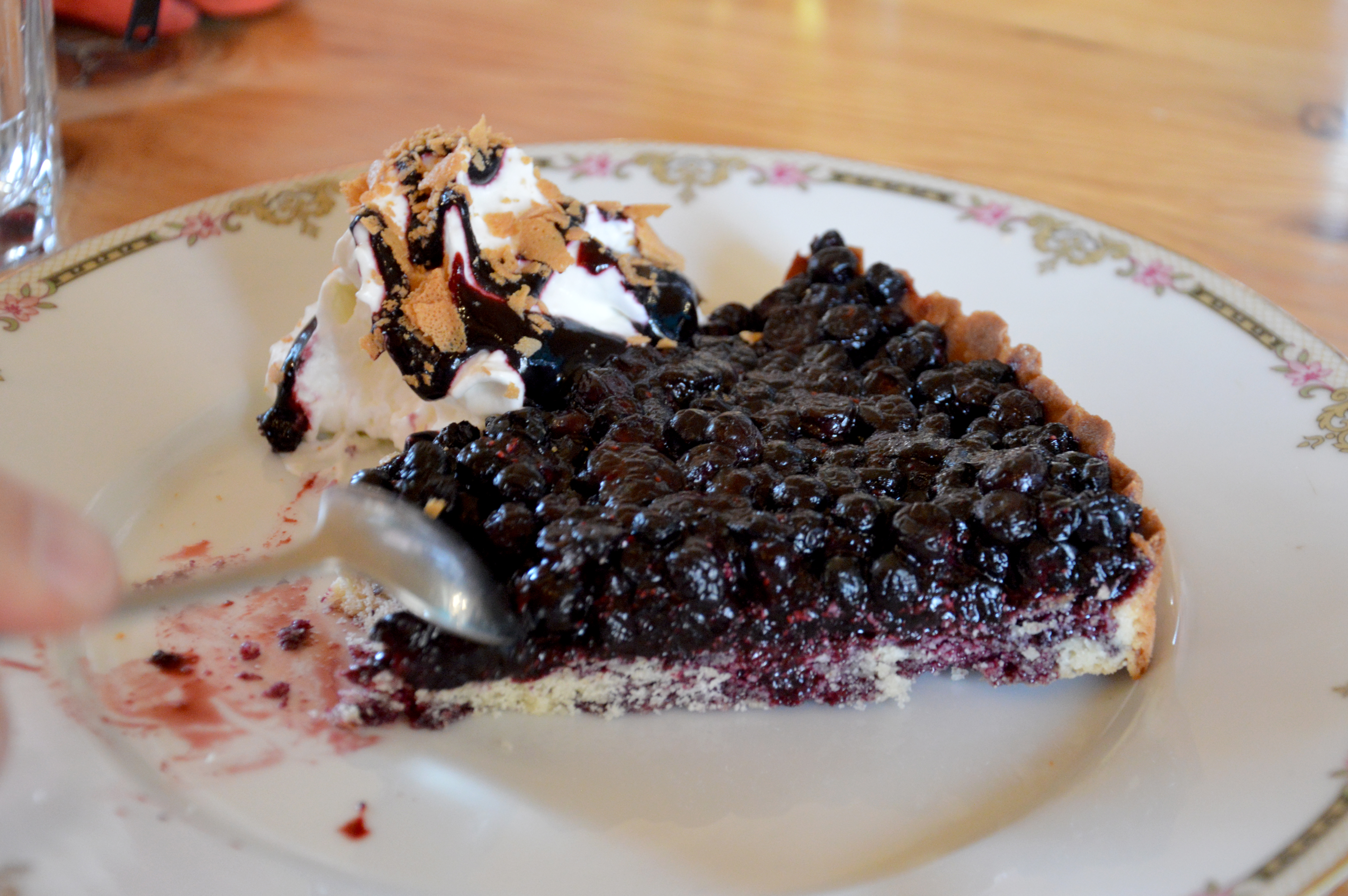
Bilberry pie, tarte aux myrtilles

The fruits are eaten fresh or made into jams, fools, juices, or pies. In France and Italy, they are used as a base for liqueurs and are a popular flavoring for sorbets and other desserts. In Brittany, they are often used as a flavoring for crêpes. In the Vosges and the Massif Central, bilberry tart (tarte aux myrtilles) is a traditional dessert. In Romania, they are used as a base for a liqueur called afinată – the name of the fruit in Romanian is afină. In Nordic countries, they are eaten fresh or made into jams and other dishes, including bilberry pie (Finnish mustikkapiirakka, Swedish blåbärspaj) and blåbärssoppa, a bilberry soup served hot or cold. In Iceland, they are eaten with skyr (a cultured dairy product similar to yoghurt). In Poland, they are eaten fresh (often mixed with sugar), as a filling in a sweet yeast-leavened bun known as jagodzianka, in jams, and with śmietana.

=== Research ===
Although bilberries have been used in traditional medicine, there are no proven health benefits or antidisease effects from consuming them. One review of low-quality clinical research concluded there was no evidence that consuming bilberries improves night vision.
