= Huckleberry =

Berry and plant

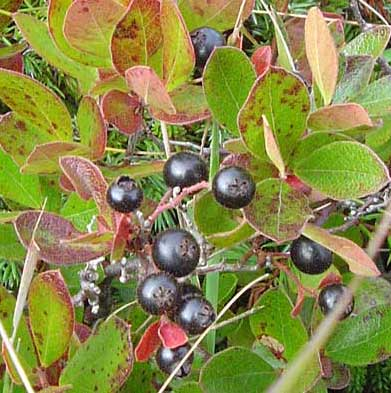
Bog huckleberries

Huckleberry is a name used in North America for several plants in the family Ericaceae, in two closely related genera: Vaccinium and Gaylussacia.

== Nomenclature ==
The name huckleberry is a North American variation of the English dialectal name variously called 'hurtleberry' or 'whortleberry' (/ˈwɜːrtəlbɛri/) for the bilberry. In North America, the name was applied to numerous plant species, all bearing small berries with colors that may be red, blue, or black. It is the common name for various Gaylussacia species, and some Vaccinium species, such as Vaccinium parvifolium, the red huckleberry, and is also applied to other Vaccinium species that may also be called blueberries depending upon local custom, as in New England and parts of Appalachia.

== Description ==
The plant has shallow, radiating roots topped by a bush growing from an underground stem. The berries are small and round, 5–10 millimetres (1/4–3/8 inch) in diameter, and look like large dark lowbush blueberries.

=== Phytochemistry ===
Two huckleberry species, V. membranaceum and V. ovatum, were studied for phytochemical content, showing that V. ovatum had greater total polyphenol and anthocyanin content than did V. membranaceum. Each species contained 15 anthocyanins (galactoside, glucoside, and arabinoside of delphinidin, cyanidin, petunidin, peonidin, and malvidin), but in different proportions.

== Taxonomy ==
=== Gaylussacia ===
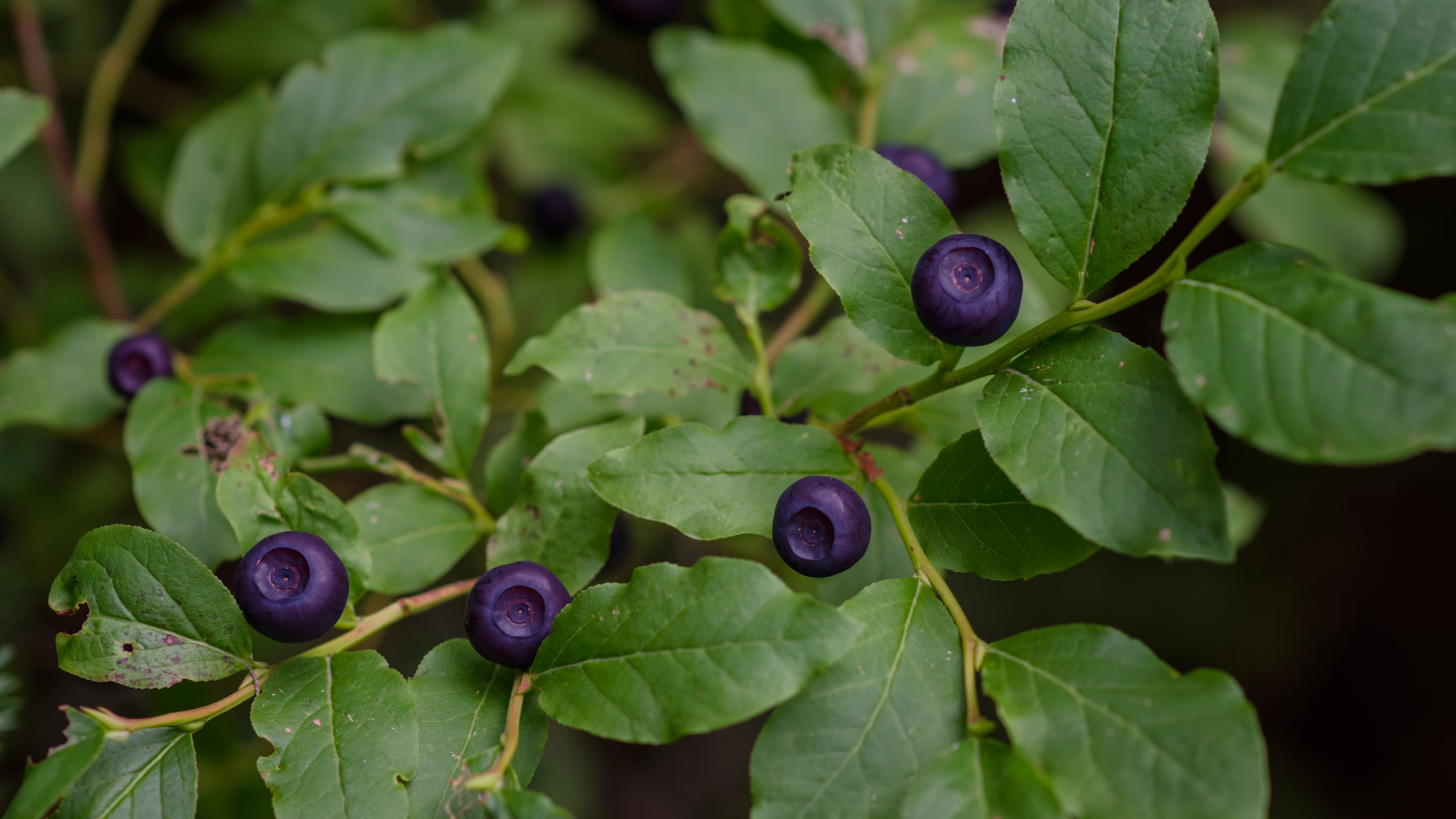
Wild huckleberry at Golden, British Columbia

Four species of huckleberries in the genus Gaylussacia are common in eastern North America, especially G. baccata, also known as the black huckleberry.

=== Vaccinium ===
From coastal Central California through Oregon to southern Washington and British Columbia, the red huckleberry (V. parvifolium) is found in the maritime-influenced plant community. In the Pacific Northwest and mountains of Montana and Idaho, this huckleberry species and several others, such as the black Vaccinium huckleberry (V. membranaceum) and blue (Cascade) huckleberry (V. deliciosum), grow in various habitats, such as mid-alpine regions up to 3,500 metres (11,500 feet) above sea level, mountain slopes, forests, or lake basins. The plant grows best in damp, acidic soil having volcanic origin, attaining under optimal conditions heights of 1.5 to 2 m (5 to 6 1/2 ft), usually ripening in mid-to-late summer or later at high elevations. Huckleberry was one of the few plant species to survive on the slopes of Mount St. Helens when the volcano erupted in 1980, and existed as a prominent mountain-slope bush in 2017.

Where the climate is favorable, certain species of huckleberry, such as V. membranaceum, V. parvifolium and V. deliciosum, are used in ornamental plantings. The 'garden huckleberry' (Solanum scabrum) is not a true huckleberry, but is instead a member of the nightshade family.

== Distribution and habitat ==
Huckleberry in the east is native to Eastern Canada and the Great Lakes region, the Midwestern and Northeastern United States, and the Appalachian Mountains, the Ohio/Mississippi/Tennessee Valley, and Southeastern United States.

Huckleberry grows wild in northwestern United States and western Canada on subalpine slopes, forests, bogs, and lake basins.

== Uses ==
Huckleberries were traditionally collected by Native American and First Nations people along the Pacific coast, interior British Columbia, Idaho, and Montana for use as food or traditional medicine. In taste, they may be tart or sweet. The fruit is versatile in foods or beverages, including jam, pudding, candy, pie, ice cream, muffins, pancakes, salad dressings, juice, tea, soup, and syrup.

Attempts to cultivate certain species of huckleberry plants from seeds have failed, with plants devoid of fruits. This may be due to the inability of the plants to fully root and replicate the native soil chemistry of wild plants.

== In popular culture ==
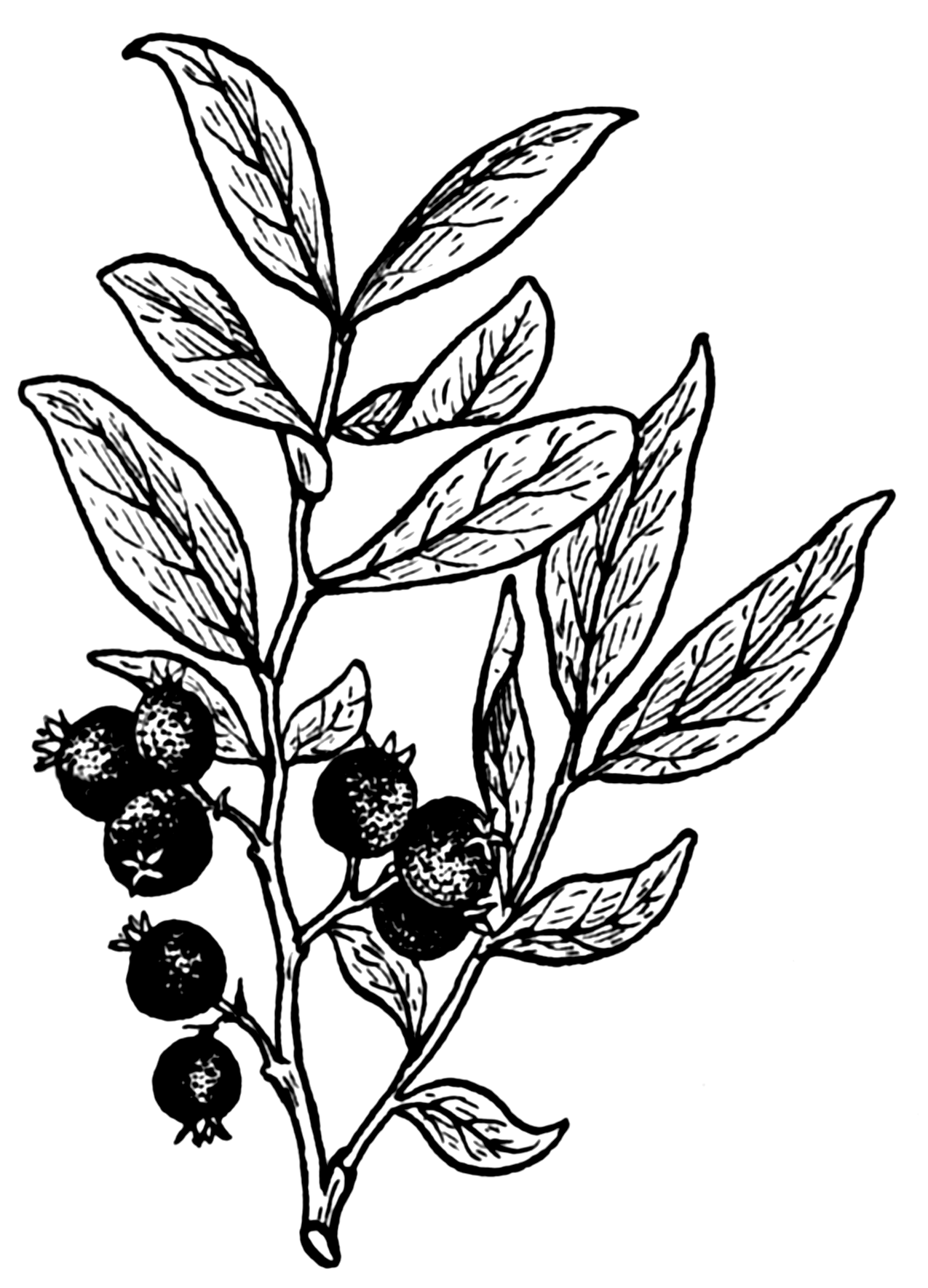
Drawing of huckleberry

Huckleberries hold a place in archaic American English slang. The phrase, "I'm your huckleberry", is a way of expressing either affection or that one is just the right person for a given role. Regarding the latter, an 1872 newspaper editorial claimed "the slang slingers will pilfer our 'unabridged Webster' away from us, word by word, phrase by phrase, until we have nothing left'.

Instead of assuring a friend that he may depend upon us in such words as, "We will gladly render you any assistance in our power," we find it handy to exclaim "I'm your huckleberry."

The range of slang meanings of huckleberry in the 19th century was broad, also referring to significant or nice persons.

Fictional characters including Huckleberry "Huck" Finn, from The Adventures of Tom Sawyer (1876) and Adventures of Huckleberry Finn (1884) by Mark Twain, and Huckleberry "Huck" Hound, an animated anthropomorphic Bluetick Coonhound created by Hanna-Barbera in 1958, have incorporated "huckleberry" into their names to indicate their rustic or insignificant nature.

"I'm your huckleberry" is an iconic line in the Western film Tombstone (1993), spoken in the sense of reliability in being the right person for the job by Val Kilmer playing Doc Holliday when he was ready to duel with Johnny Ringo in a graveyard. It is a chapter title in Kilmer's memoir and has had continued use over decades in various media as a pop culture meme.

The huckleberry is the state fruit of both Idaho and Montana.

== See also ==
- Vaccinium ovatum (known by the common names evergreen huckleberry, winter huckleberry, and California huckleberry)
- Cyrilla racemiflora (known as "he-huckleberry" in the family of Cyrillaceae)
- Solanum scabrum, (known as "garden huckleberry" in the family Solanaceae)
