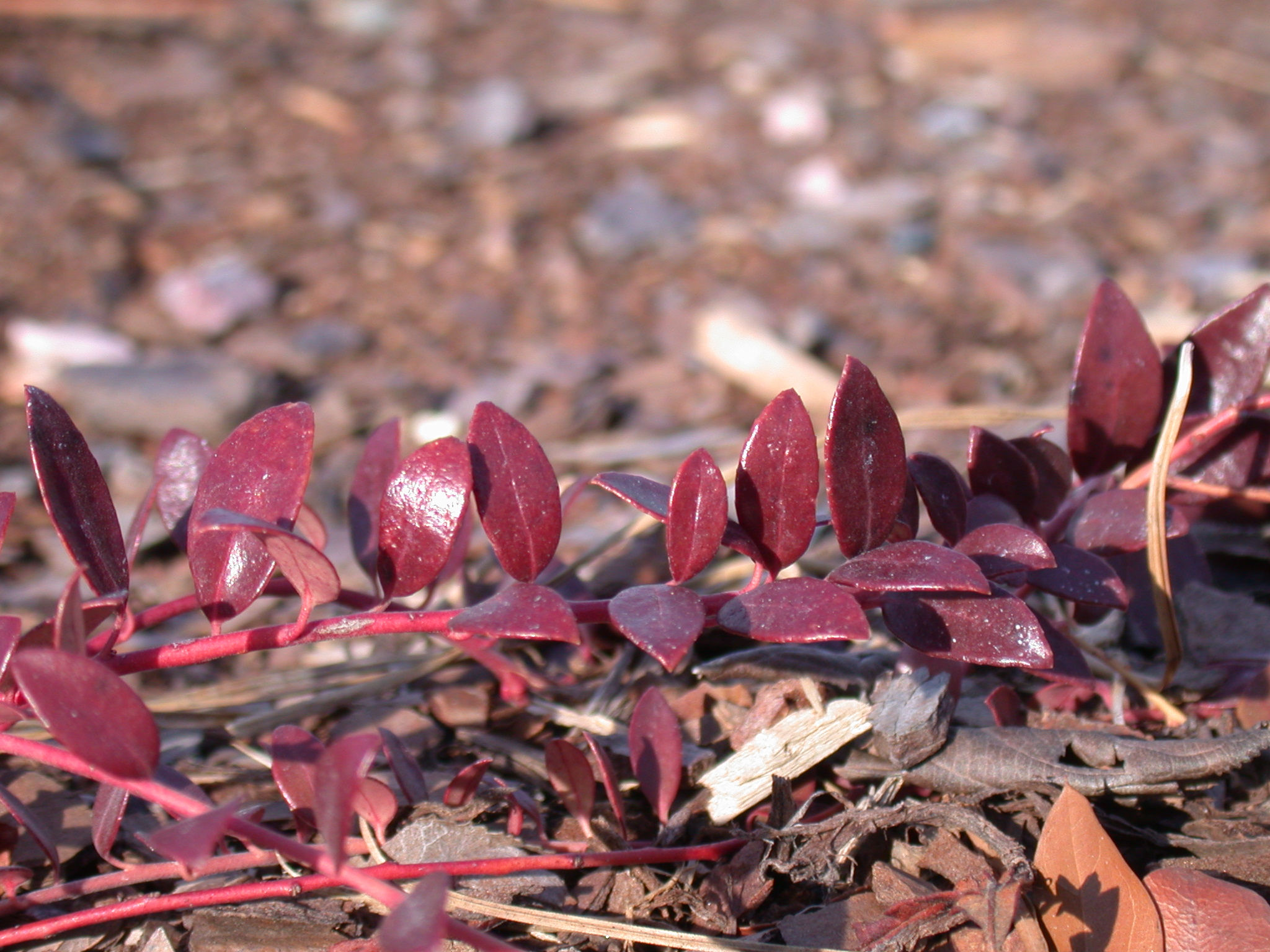
- United States Botanic Garden's; National Garden, Washington

Conservation status
- Apparently Secure (NatureServe)

Scientific classification
- Kingdom: Plantae
- Clade: Embryophytes
- Clade: Tracheophytes
- Clade: Spermatophytes
- Clade: Angiosperms
- Clade: Eudicots
- Clade: Asterids
- Order: Ericales
- Family: Ericaceae
- Genus: Vaccinium
- Species: V. crassifolium

Binomial name
- Vaccinium crassifolium Andrews

Synonyms
- Herpothamnus crassifolius (Andrews) Small; Vaccinium crassifolium subsp. sempervirens (D.A.Rayner & J. Henderson) W.B.Kirkman & Ballington; Vaccinium sempervirens D.A.Rayner & J.Henderson

= Vaccinium crassifolium =

Berry and plant

Vaccinium crassifolium, or the creeping blueberry, is a species of Vaccinium, part of the heath family. It is native to a portion of the Southeastern United States.

== Description ==
The species forms an evergreen shrub with shiny dark green to bronze leaves. It has a diploid set of genes, with a total of 24 chromosomes.

== Taxonomy ==
Vaccinium crassifolium is the only species in Vaccinium sect. Herpothamnus. Some sources have recognized a second species, V. sempervirens, but recent authors combine the two into a single species.

Creeping blueberries, although they are native to North America, do not seem to be most closely related to North American blueberries, but instead to South American Vaccinium species.

== Distribution and habitat ==
Vaccinium crassifolium is native to the coastal plain of Georgia, the Carolinas, and southeastern Virginia, especially in pine barrens but also in disturbed settings like roadsides and other open areas.

== Uses ==
The leaves resemble those of bearberry (Arctostaphylos uva-ursi) and may be used in the latter's place in herbal medicine.

Vaccinium crassifolium has been cultivated since at least about 1787, and several cultivars are available for planting as a groundcover in landscaping gardens.
