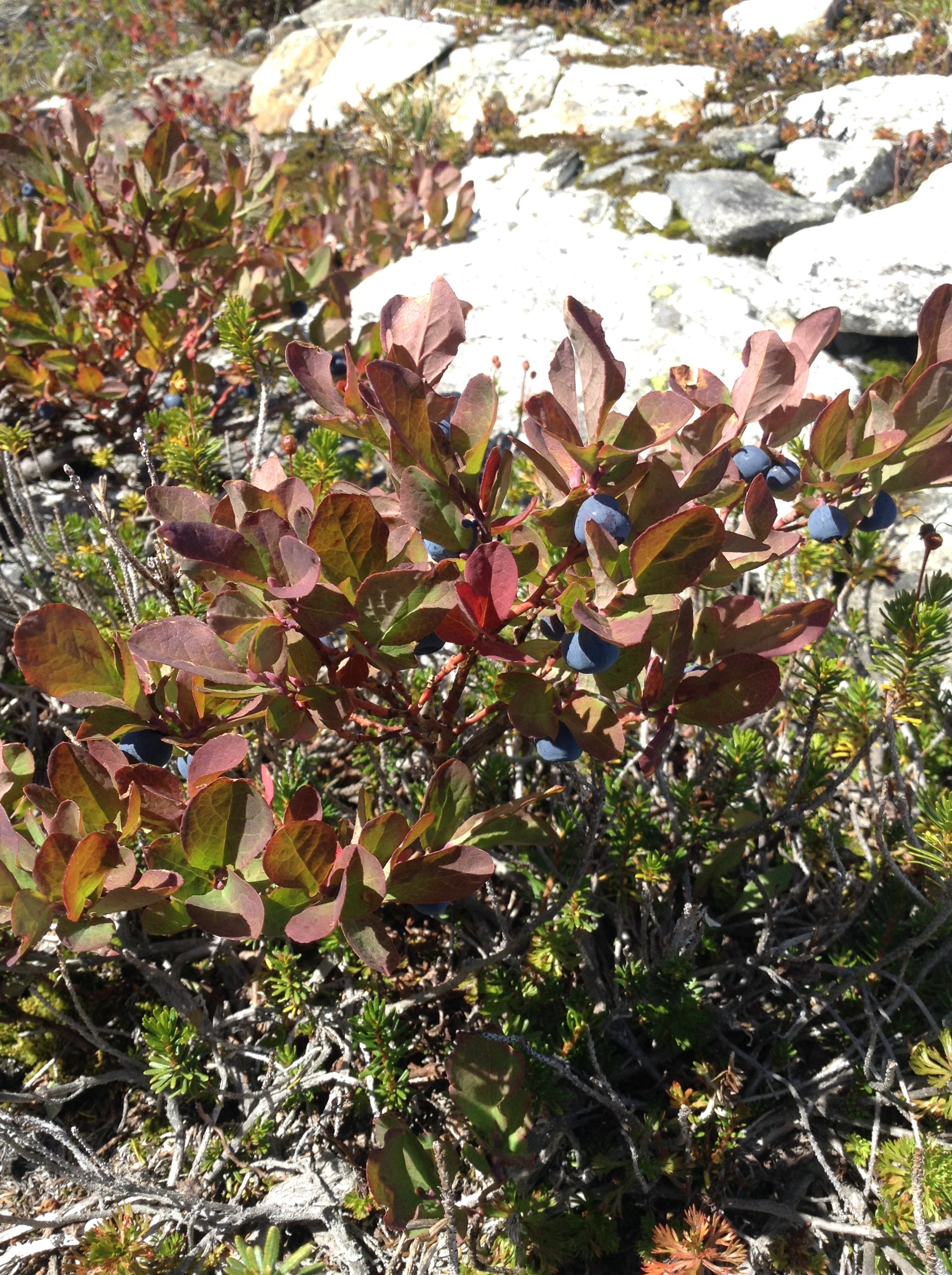
- Vaccinium deliciosum full plant

Scientific classification
- Kingdom: Plantae
- Clade: Embryophytes
- Clade: Tracheophytes
- Clade: Spermatophytes
- Clade: Angiosperms
- Clade: Eudicots
- Clade: Asterids
- Order: Ericales
- Family: Ericaceae
- Genus: Vaccinium
- Species: V. deliciosum

Binomial name
- Vaccinium deliciosum Piper 1901

= Vaccinium deliciosum =

Species of flowering plant

Vaccinium deliciosum is a species of bilberry known by the common names Cascade bilberry, Cascade blueberry, and blueleaf huckleberry. It is a flowering plant in the heath family Ericaceae. The species is native to western North America.

== Description ==
Vaccinium deliciosum is a rhizomatous shrub taking a clumpy, matted form, its tangling stem rooting where its nodes touch moist substrate. It may form expansive colonies. The new green twigs are hairless and waxy and the deciduous leaves are alternately arranged. The thin oval leaf blades are between 1.5 and 5 cm in length while the edges are mostly smooth but may be serrated near the ends.

Solitary flowers occur in the leaf axils. Each is 6 or 7 millimeters long, widely urn-shaped to rounded, and pale pink in color. The fruit is a waxy blue or reddish berry with a powdery coating which may be over a centimeter (>0.4 inches) wide. According to the botanist Charles Piper, the berry is very tasty. This species can sometimes be confused with Vaccinium caespitosum which grows in wetter areas in the same region. V. deliciosum has a powdery coating on the underside of its leaves, while V. caespitosum does not.

=== Physiology ===
Studies show that the intense flavor of the fruits of this plant come from at least 31 different aromatic flavor compounds V. deliciosum, like other plants that live alpine communities, have adapted to survive in growing seasons as short as three or four months. From late fall to spring, the plants rely on snow cover to insulate them from temperatures more than several degrees below freezing. Blossoms can become damaged and summer growth can be stunted if the plants experience a hard frost below negative four degrees celsius if unprotected by snow. However, the plants require a vernalization period of freezing temperatures for at least a few months for flowering to occur.

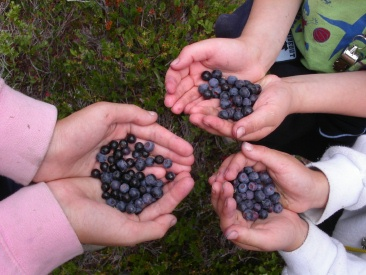
Vaccinium deliciosum fruit

== Distribution and habitat ==
Vaccinium deliciosum is native to western North America from British Columbia to northern California with a few isolated populations in eastern Idaho. It grows at elevations of 600–2,000 metres (2,000–6,600 ft) in subalpine and alpine climates. Its habitat includes coniferous forests, meadows, and clearings.

== Ecology ==
The berries are an important food source subalpine zones, and especially in alpine communities which do not have very many edible plants. Animals that feed on the berries include black bear, birds, mice, and chipmunks, while rabbits and deer eat the foliage. The berries were a staple in the diet of Native Americans in the Columbia Plateau region, who would often travel long distances to harvest the berries. Some tribes performed prescribed burns to create more favorable habitats for the plant. After naturally occurring and prescribed forest fires in alpine communities, V. deliciousum is often one of the most successful surviving plant species. Since the shrub is rhizomatous, it is sometimes possible to transplant and cultivate cuttings for agricultural or landscaping purposes. However, V. deliciosum often has difficulty growing at elevations below 2,000 ft.

== Uses ==
The sweet berries are edible. They can be eaten fresh, dried, or cooked in various dishes.
