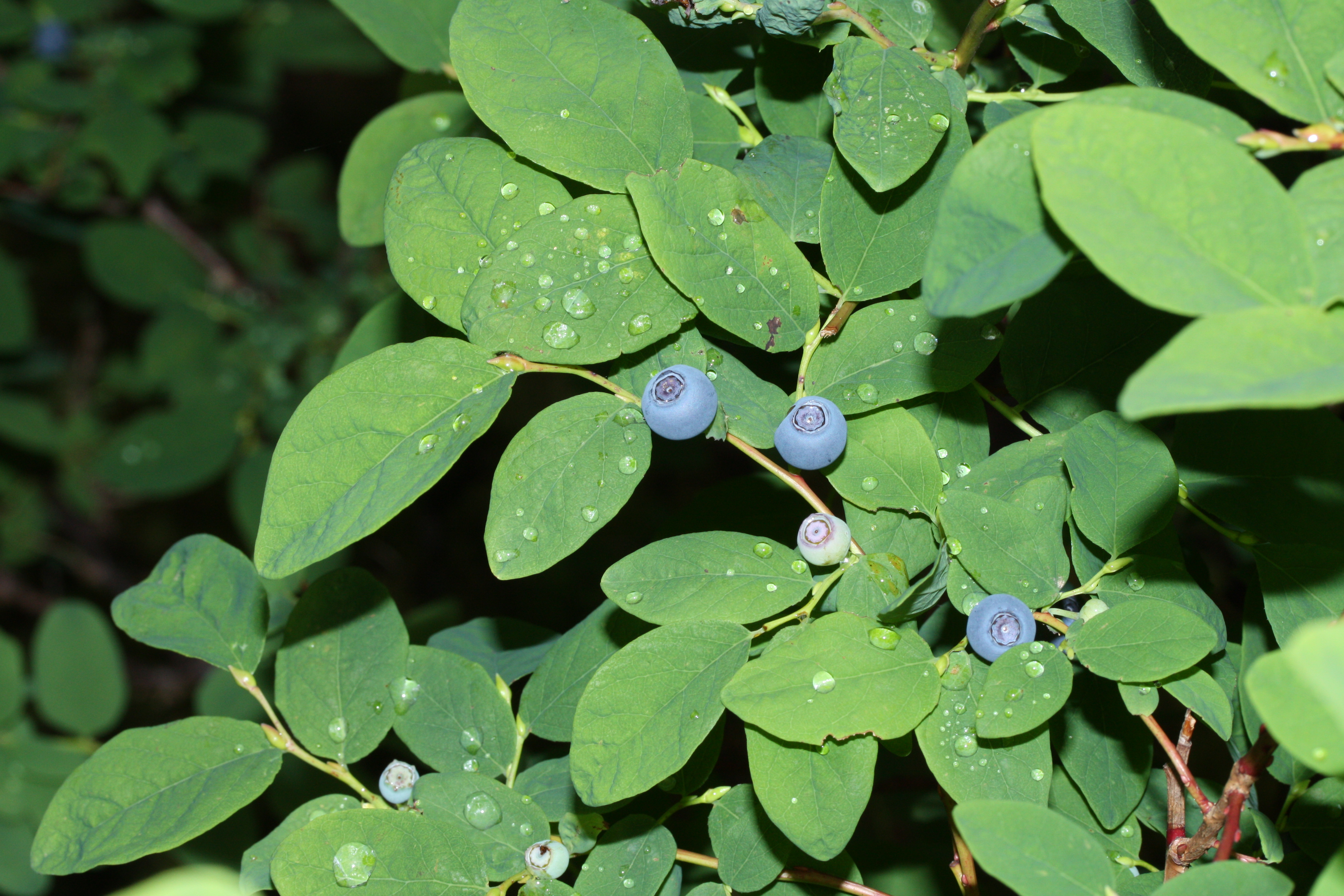
- Mount Baker–Snoqualmie National Forest, Washington

Conservation status
- Secure (NatureServe)

Scientific classification
- Kingdom: Plantae
- Clade: Tracheophytes
- Clade: Angiosperms
- Clade: Eudicots
- Clade: Asterids
- Order: Ericales
- Family: Ericaceae
- Genus: Vaccinium
- Section: Vaccinium sect. Myrtillus
- Species: V. ovalifolium

Binomial name
- Vaccinium ovalifolium Sm.

Varieties
- V. o. var. alpinum (Tatew.) T.Yamaz.; V. o. var. ovalifolium (autonym); V. o. var. sachalinense T.Yamaz.

Synonyms
- Synonymy: V. alaskaense Howell; V. axillare Nakai; V. chamissonis Bong.; V. c. var. alpinum Tatew. [≡V. o. var. alpinum]; V. o. var. coriaceum Boiss. [≡V. o. var. ovalifolium]

= Vaccinium ovalifolium =

Species of flowering plant

Vaccinium ovalifolium (commonly known as Alaska blueberry, early blueberry, oval-leaf bilberry, oval-leaf blueberry, and oval-leaf huckleberry) is a plant in the heath family with three varieties, all of which grow in northerly regions.

== Description ==
V. ovalifolium is a spreading shrub which may grow to 2 metres (6 1/2 ft) tall. The twigs are brown, yellow or reddish, while the older bark is grayish. The leaves are 2.5–3.5 centimetres (1–1 1/2 in) long, green on top, and pale below.

The plant has pink, 0.64 cm (1/4 in), urn-shaped flowers. The berries are dark blue, often black, 0.5–1 cm (1/4–3/8 in) across, and sometimes have a waxy coating.

Cytology is 2n = 24, 72.

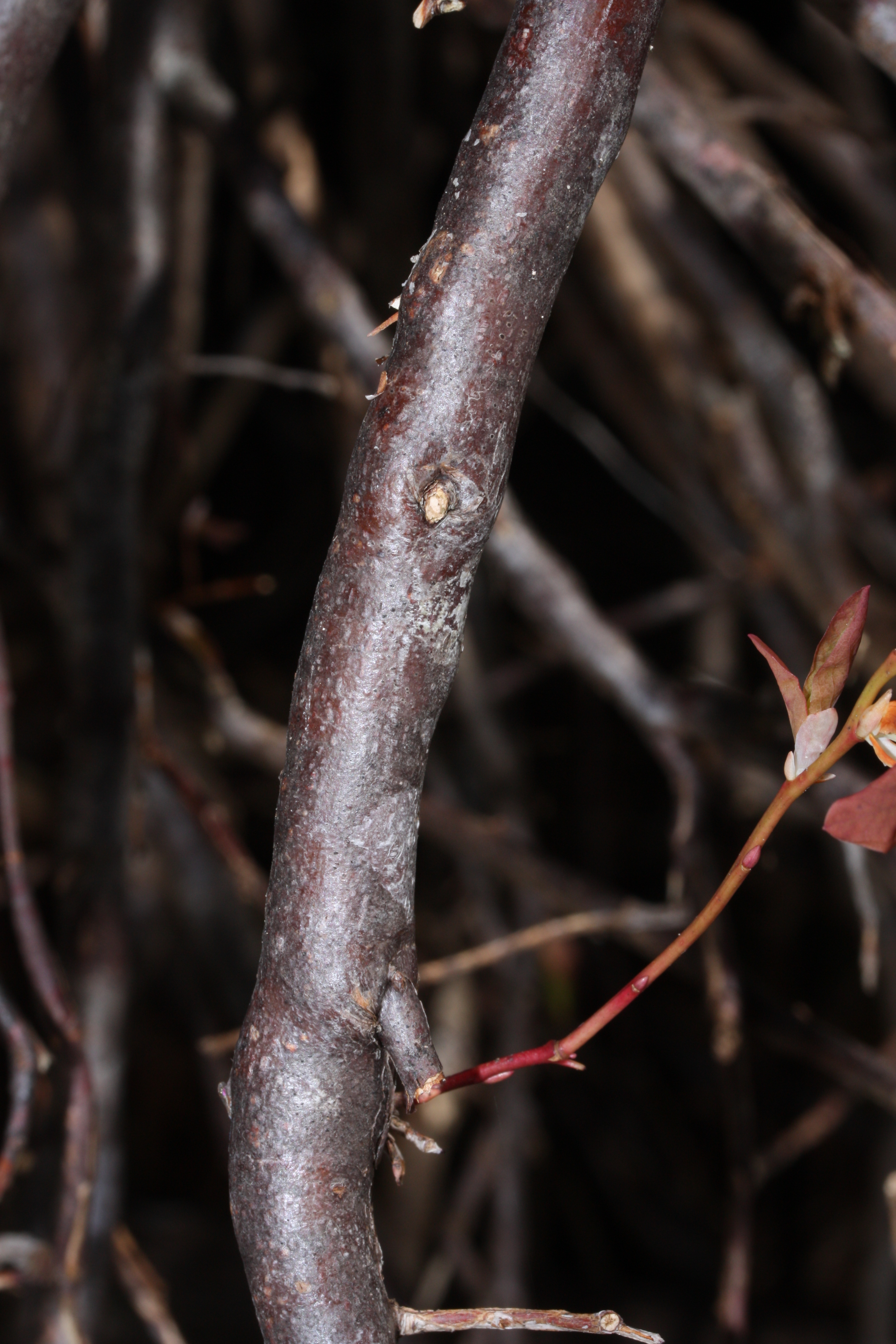
Bark and twigs

== Distribution ==
The original variety (i.e. the automatically named V. o. var. ovalifolium) is found on both the eastern and western sides of the Pacific Ocean. In North America, it is distributed throughout Canada (Alberta, British Columbia, Newfoundland, Nova Scotia, southern Ontario, southeast Quebec, and southern Yukon) and the United States (southern Alaska, Idaho, northern Michigan, Oregon, western South Dakota, and Washington).

In Asia, the plant is distributed throughout Russia (Kamchatka, the southern Kuril Islands, Primorsky Krai, and Sakhalin) and Japan (Hokkaido and central and northern Honshu).

The two other varieties are confined to Japan and Russia:

- V. o. var. sachalinense is only found in Sakhalin in Russia, and Hokkaido in Japan.
- V. o. var. alpinum is distributed only within the Daisetsu and Hidaka Mountains, both on the island of Hokkaido.

== Ecology ==
In the winter, V. ovalifolium is an important food source for grazing deer, goats, and elk, and in the summer the nectar feeds hummingbirds.

== Uses ==
V. ovalifolium is used in jams and jellies and for making liqueur. Blueberry herbal tea can be made from the leaves, or from the juice of the blueberries themselves, which are edible.

V. ovalifolium has been used in Russia in the making of dyes, including the use of its tannin.
