= Vaccinium ovatum =

- Vaccinium ovatum in California

Scientific classification
- Kingdom: Plantae
- Clade: Tracheophytes
- Clade: Angiosperms
- Clade: Eudicots
- Clade: Asterids
- Order: Ericales
- Family: Ericaceae
- Genus: Vaccinium
- Section: Vaccinium sect. Pyxothamnus
- Species: V. ovatum

Binomial name
- Vaccinium ovatum Pursh 1813

Berry and plant

Vaccinium ovatum is a North American species of huckleberry in the heather family commonly known as the evergreen huckleberry, winter huckleberry, cynamoka berry and California huckleberry. It is a tall woody shrub that produces fleshy, edible berries in the summer.

The species has a large distribution on the Pacific Coast of North America ranging from southern British Columbia to southern California. The plant is used for food, natural landscaping, and floral arrangements.

== Description ==
Vaccinium ovatum is an erect shrub that grows from 0.5 to 3 metres (1 1/2 to 10 ft) tall and is considered a slow-growing plant. The shrub has woody stems with bright red bark. The leaves are waxy, alternately arranged, and egg-shaped; they are about 2 to 5 centimetres (3/4 to 2 in) long and about 1 cm wide with finely serrated edges. The leaves are a variety of colors from dark green to bright red, due to different intensities of sun exposure, higher amounts of which produce redder leaves.

Vaccinium ovatum produces flowers in the early spring through early summer with white and light pink flowers. These flowers are urceolate, "urn shaped" and pendent, "hanging". The flowers are also bisexual, containing both stamens and a pistil. These flowers have five flower parts, and through the lifecycle eventually form a five-chamber fleshy berry.

Berries are produced and ripen through the summer and into fall, remaining on the shrub for up to a month before falling to the ground. The berries are a dark purple to black color and are a little under 1 cm in diameter when ripe. They are tart, likely due to their high content of phenolic acids, producing a pH of about 2.6.

Vaccinium ovatum is typically diploid, although research has found rare naturally occurring tetraploids as well as lab-produced tetraploids. It has 24 chromosomes.

Details of the foliage

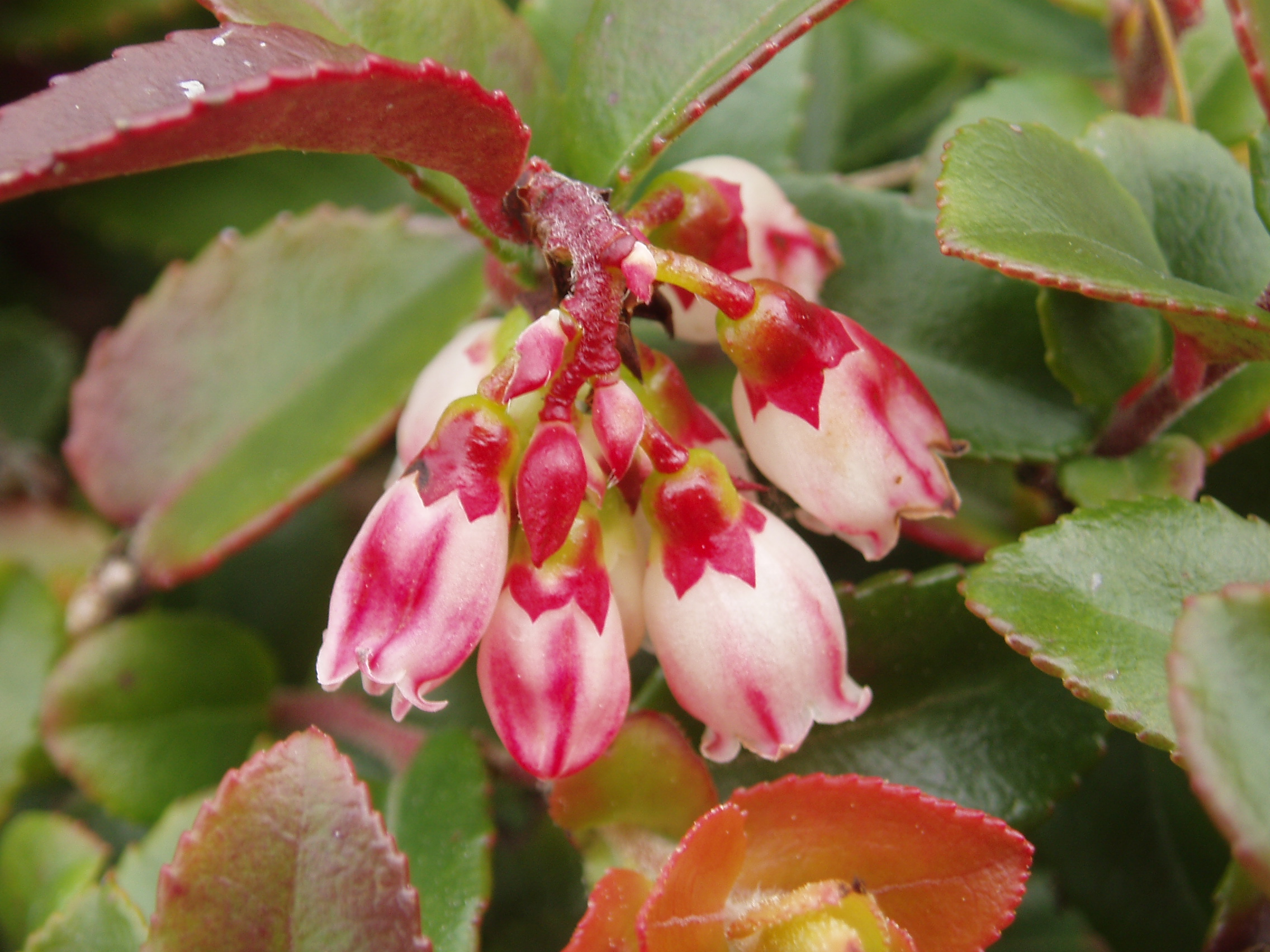
Developing flower buds

Detail of the flowers

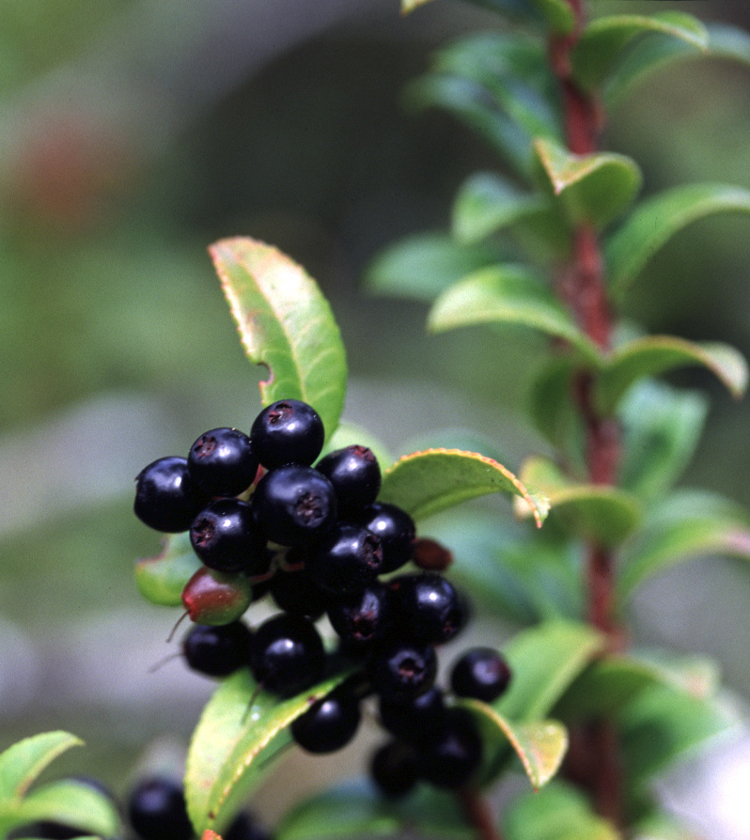
The fruits

The red bark

== Distribution and habitat ==
Vaccinium ovatum is native to British Columbia, Washington, Oregon, and California. It is found in a contiguous distribution west of the Cascades from southern British Columbia to the redwood forests of the California Coast Ranges. Although mostly coastal, it can be found up to 100 kilometres (62 mi) inland in southern Oregon.

South of the redwood area, it occurs sporadically along the Coast Ranges to the western Transverse Ranges near Santa Barbara and on the California Channel Islands. Disjunct relictual populations exist on a few peaks in the Peninsular Range mountains of San Diego County, mostly on El Cajon Mountain, the southernmost natural extent of the species.

The primary habitat of V. ovatum consists of moist, yet well-drained and acidic soil. As many plants, Vaccinium ovatum thrives in the sun but is also very tolerant of shade. These preferred conditions can all be found west of the Cascade Mountain range where this species is often found thriving. Though V. ovatum can be found in the higher elevations of Southern California, they are primarily found in the coastal forests of Northern California, Oregon, Washington, and British Columbia, where it can grow in the salt spray.

Vaccinium ovatum is an understory bush, often dominant in its habitat. Other species commonly found growing nearby are V. parvifolium (red huckleberries) and Symphoricarpos albus (common snowberry). Vaccinuim ovatum appear to thrive better in old-growth forests. This is most likely because they are a slow growing plant and require more time to reach maturity.

== Ecology ==
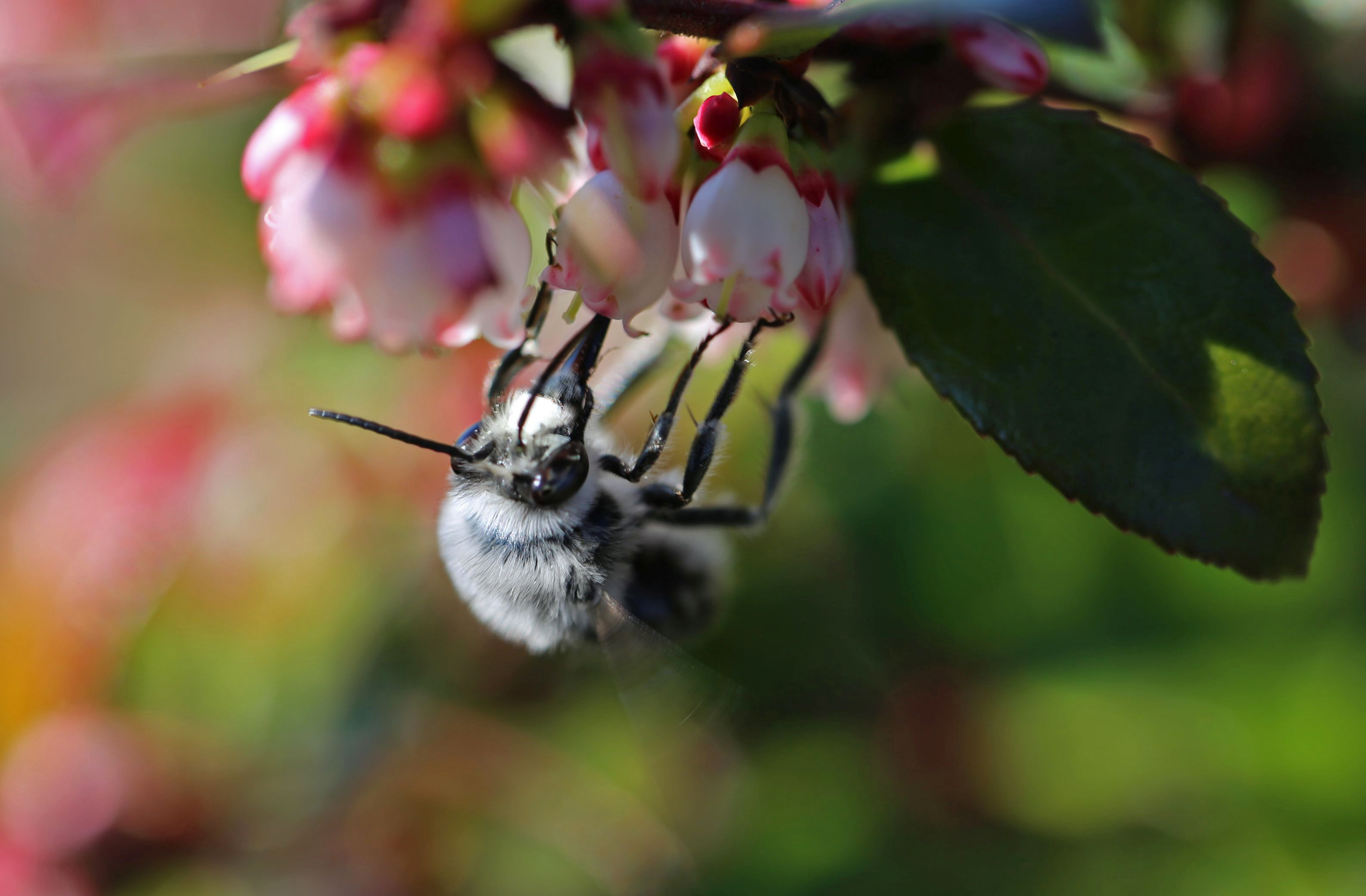
Vaccinium ovatum visited by a pollinator

Vaccinium ovatum interacts with many other species for reasons spanning from resource competition to seed dispersal. V. ovatum also provides food for animals, facilitating seed dispersal. In addition to seed dispersal, V. ovatum relies on other species to disperse their pollen (pollination). Their flowers are insect pollinated. Vaccinium ovatum is a common food source for migrating birds.

In 2003, V. ovatum populations became infected with a fungal disease caused by Pucciniastrum goeppertianum (witch's broom). The disease caused stem proliferation and decreased berry production, but did not kill the plants.

== Uses ==
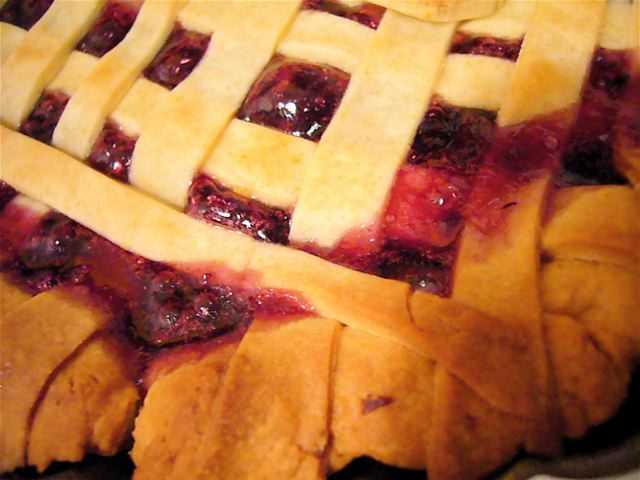
Pie made with filling of blueberries and huckleberries

The berries are edible, and consumed raw, cooked, or dried. They are also incorporated into many common food items, such as pies, pancakes, muffins, other pastries, as well as jams, jellies, wine, and tea.

Native Americans have historically used the berries for food and traditional medicine purposes.

Vaccinium ovatum is grown as an ornamental plant for horticultural use by specialty wholesale, retail, and garden nurseries. The plant is successful in natural landscape and native plant palette style, and habitat gardens and public sustainable landscape and restoration projects that are similar to its habitat conditions. They are not grown commercially as a fruit crop.

American botanist John Milton Bigelow wrote about the plant in 1853. From the 1930s to 1950s, some 500–1,000 tons were shipped to Europe for domestic sale per year. Because the beautiful stems and leaves were so popular in floral arrangements in the early 20th century, V. ovatum became scarce. In an effort to keep them from becoming legally endangered, Frank Moll, transplanted healthy specimens to his property where he started a nursery. Moll died in 1960, but his nursery continued to thrive even without his care.

== See also ==
- Vaccinium parvifolium
- California mixed evergreen forest
- Huckleberry Botanic Regional Preserve

== Bibliography ==
- Foster, Steven; Hobbs, Christopher (2002). Western Medicinal Plants and Herbs. Houghton Mifflin Harcourt. p. 287. ISBN 978-0-395-83806-8. OCLC 1064802627.
