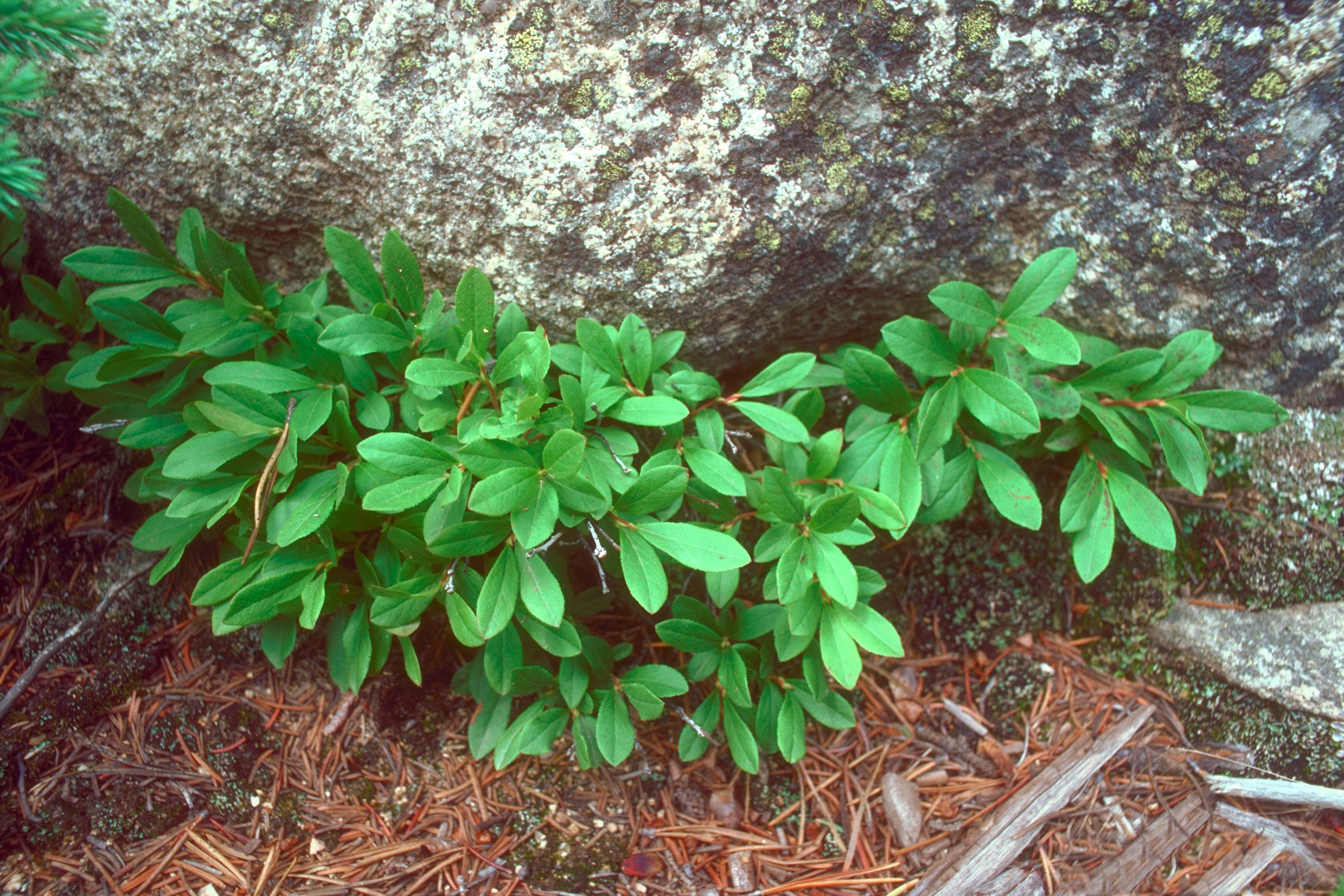

Conservation status
- Secure (NatureServe)

Scientific classification
- Kingdom: Plantae
- Clade: Embryophytes
- Clade: Tracheophytes
- Clade: Spermatophytes
- Clade: Angiosperms
- Clade: Eudicots
- Clade: Asterids
- Order: Ericales
- Family: Ericaceae
- Genus: Vaccinium
- Species: V. cespitosum

Binomial name
- Vaccinium cespitosum Michx. 1803

Synonyms
- Vaccinium caespitosum A.Gray; Vaccinium arbuscula (A.Gray) Merriam; Vaccinium nivictum Camp

= Vaccinium cespitosum =

Berry and plant

Vaccinium cespitosum (also, caespitosum), known as the dwarf bilberry, dwarf blueberry, or dwarf huckleberry, is a species of flowering shrub in the genus Vaccinium, which includes blueberries, huckleberries, and cranberries.

== Description ==
Vaccinium cespitosum is a low-lying plant rarely reaching 0.5 metres (1 1/2 feet) tall. It forms a carpet-like stand, spreading on runners or stolons. The foliage is reddish-green to green. It has somewhat angled or ridged branches.

Blooming from May to June, the flowers are tiny urn-shaped white-to-pink cups less than 1 centimetre (3/8 inch) wide. They are waxy and have five united petals. Unlike true blueberries, which flowers are in clusters, the flowers always occur singly. They are pollinated by bees and flies. The dark blue fruits, bilberries, are on the plant by late-summer. The berries also have a whitish bloom. There are many seeds in the fruit.

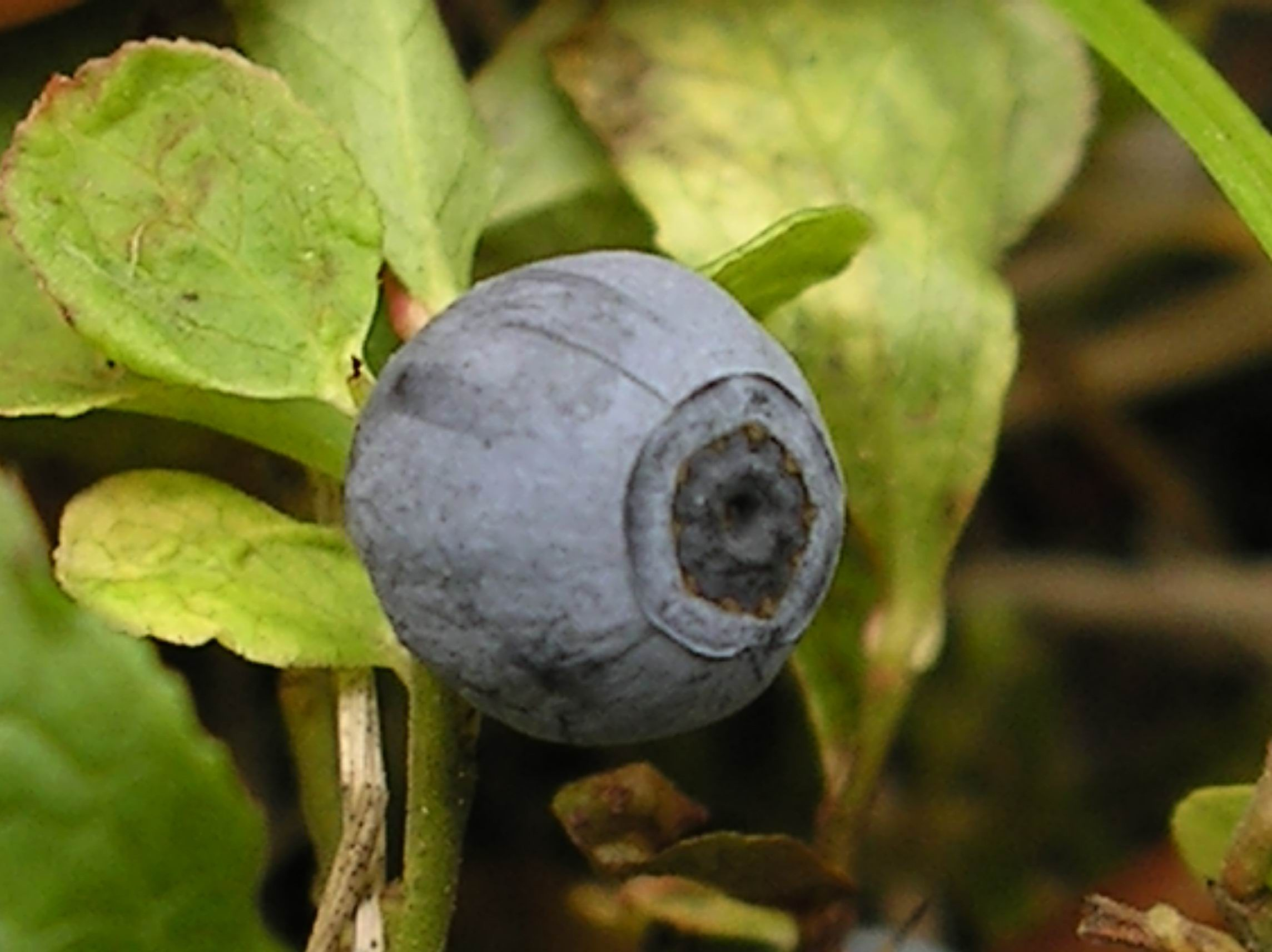
Fruit

== Distribution and habitat ==
Vaccinium cespitosum is widespread across much of Canada including all three Arctic territories, as well as the northern and western United States, Mexico, and Guatemala. Its native habitats include gravelly or rocky meadows and mountain slopes. In the Great Lakes area, it is usually found in savannas or conifer forests. Where bilberry is common, it can be found at higher elevations and in spruce-fir forest. It can also be found in alpine heath and in shrublands.

== Ecology ==
Both grizzly and black bears eat the fruit. The plant is a host of the butterfly species Lycaeides idas nabokovi.

== Uses ==
The blue bilberries are edible.
