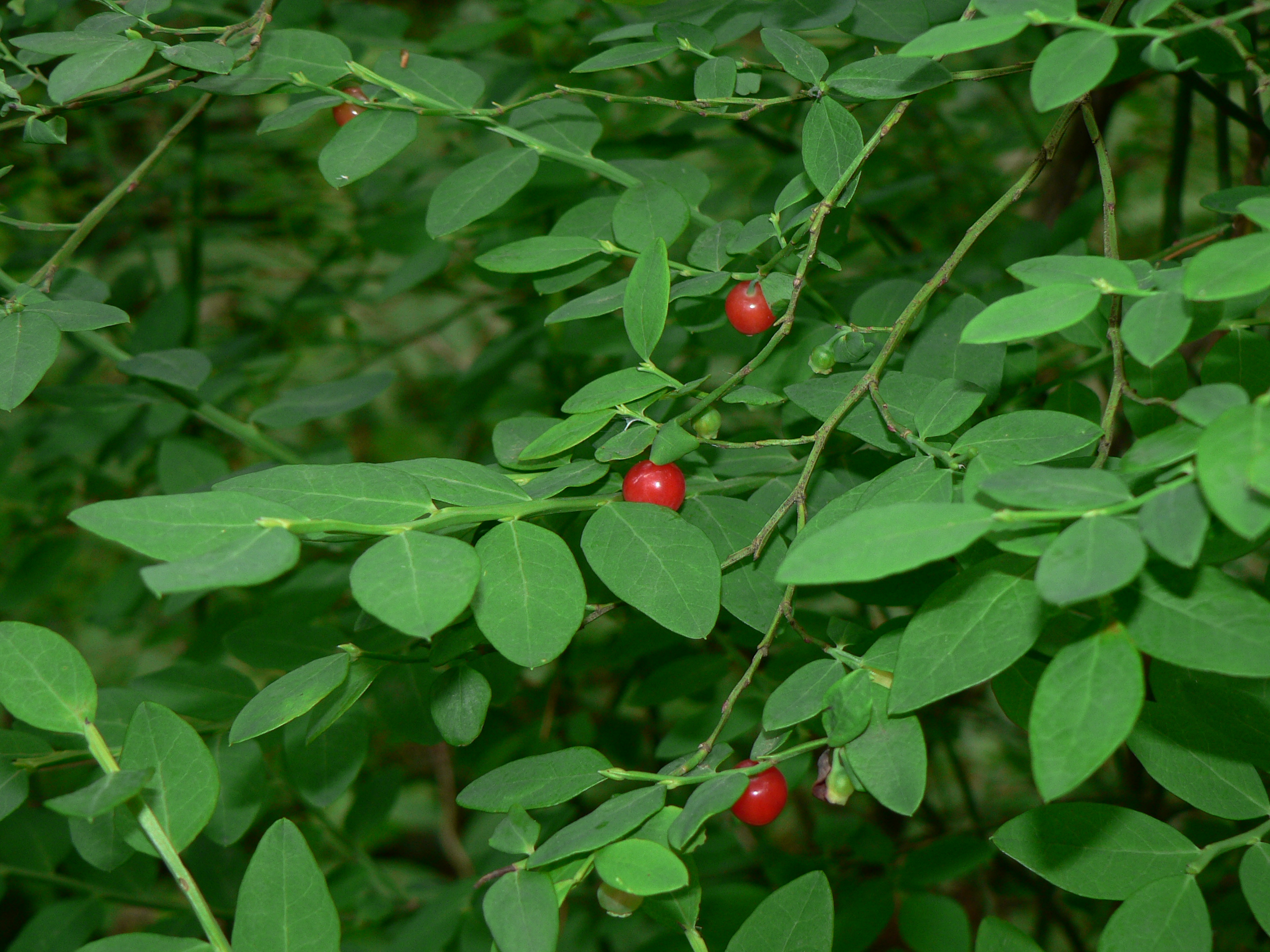
- Fruit and leaves in Issaquah, Washington

Scientific classification
- Kingdom: Plantae
- Clade: Embryophytes
- Clade: Tracheophytes
- Clade: Angiosperms
- Clade: Eudicots
- Clade: Asterids
- Order: Ericales
- Family: Ericaceae
- Genus: Vaccinium
- Species: V. parvifolium

Binomial name
- Vaccinium parvifolium Sm.

= Vaccinium parvifolium =

Berry and plant

Vaccinium parvifolium, the red huckleberry, is a species of Vaccinium native to western North America.

== Description ==
It is a deciduous shrub growing to 4 metres (13 feet) tall with bright green shoots and an angular cross-section. The leaves are ovate to oblong-elliptic, 9 to 30 millimetres (1/4 to 1 1/4 inches) long, and 4 to 16 mm (1/8 to 5/8 in) wide, with an entire margin.

The nodding flowers appear singly in leaf axils. The flowers are yellow-white to pinkish, decumbent, bell-shaped, and 4 to 5 mm (3/16 to 3/16 in) long.

The fruit is an edible red to orange berry 6 to 10 mm (1/4 to 3/8 in) in diameter. The species is diploid with 24 chromosomes.

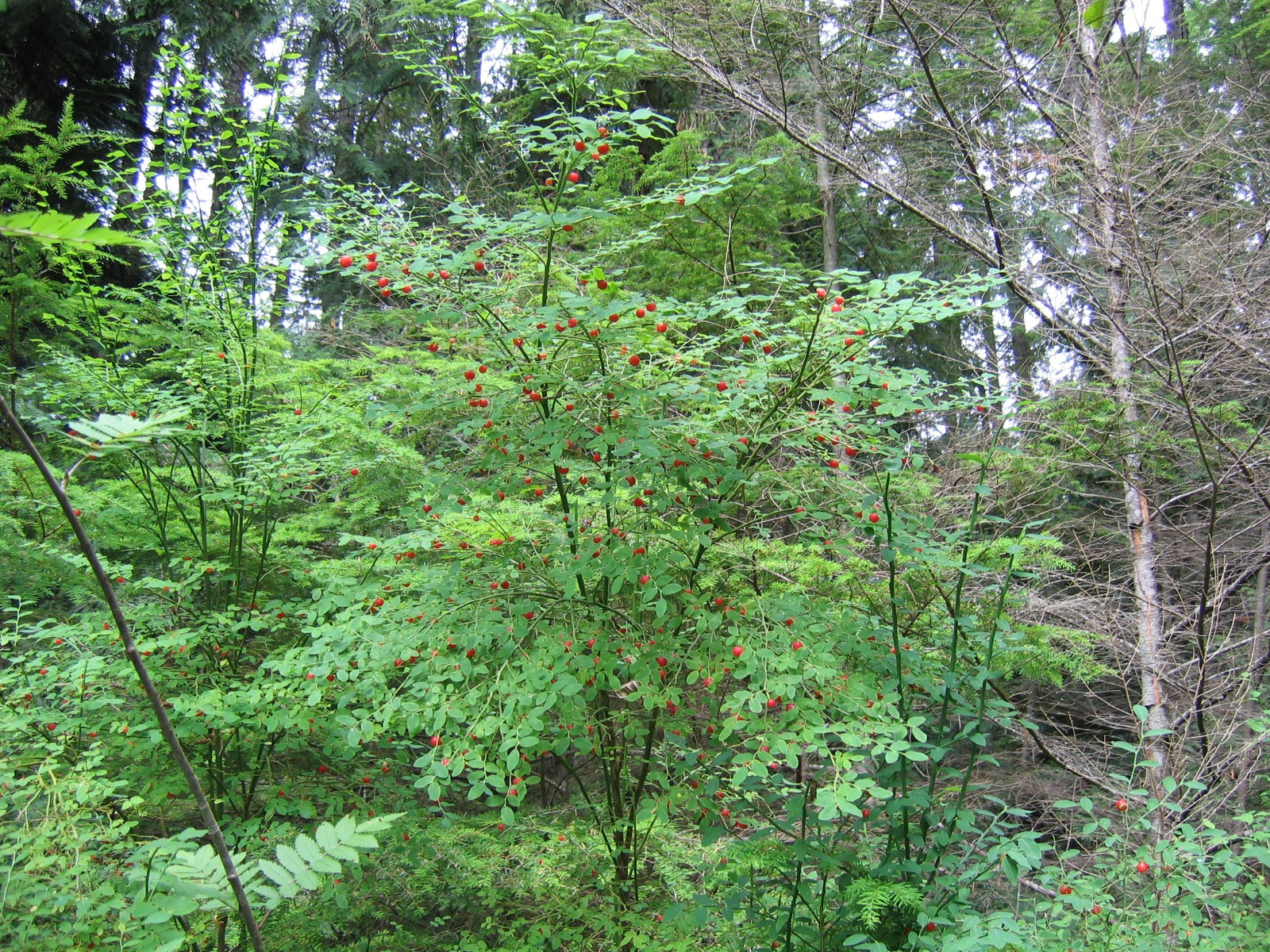
Whole plant

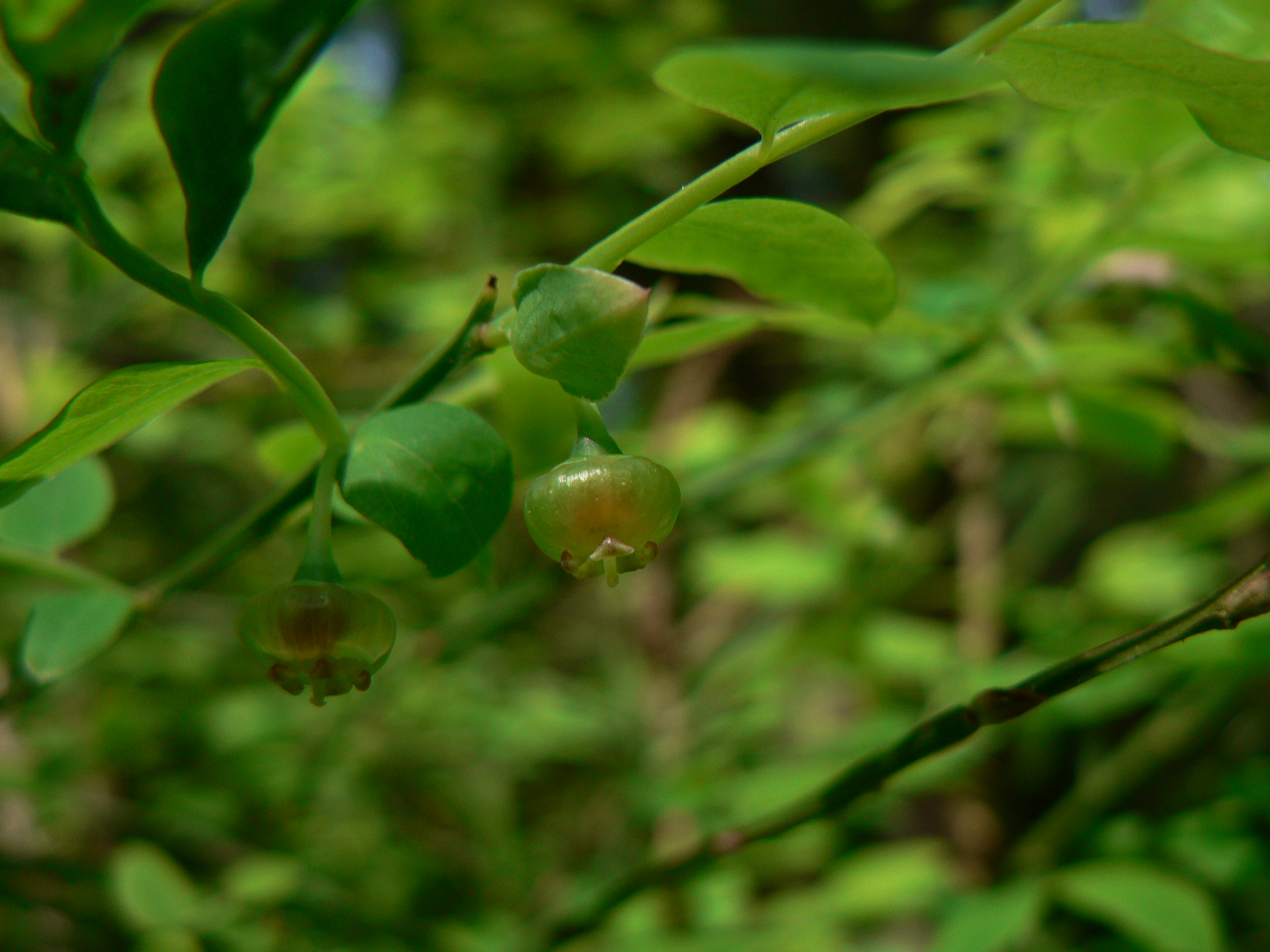
Blossoms

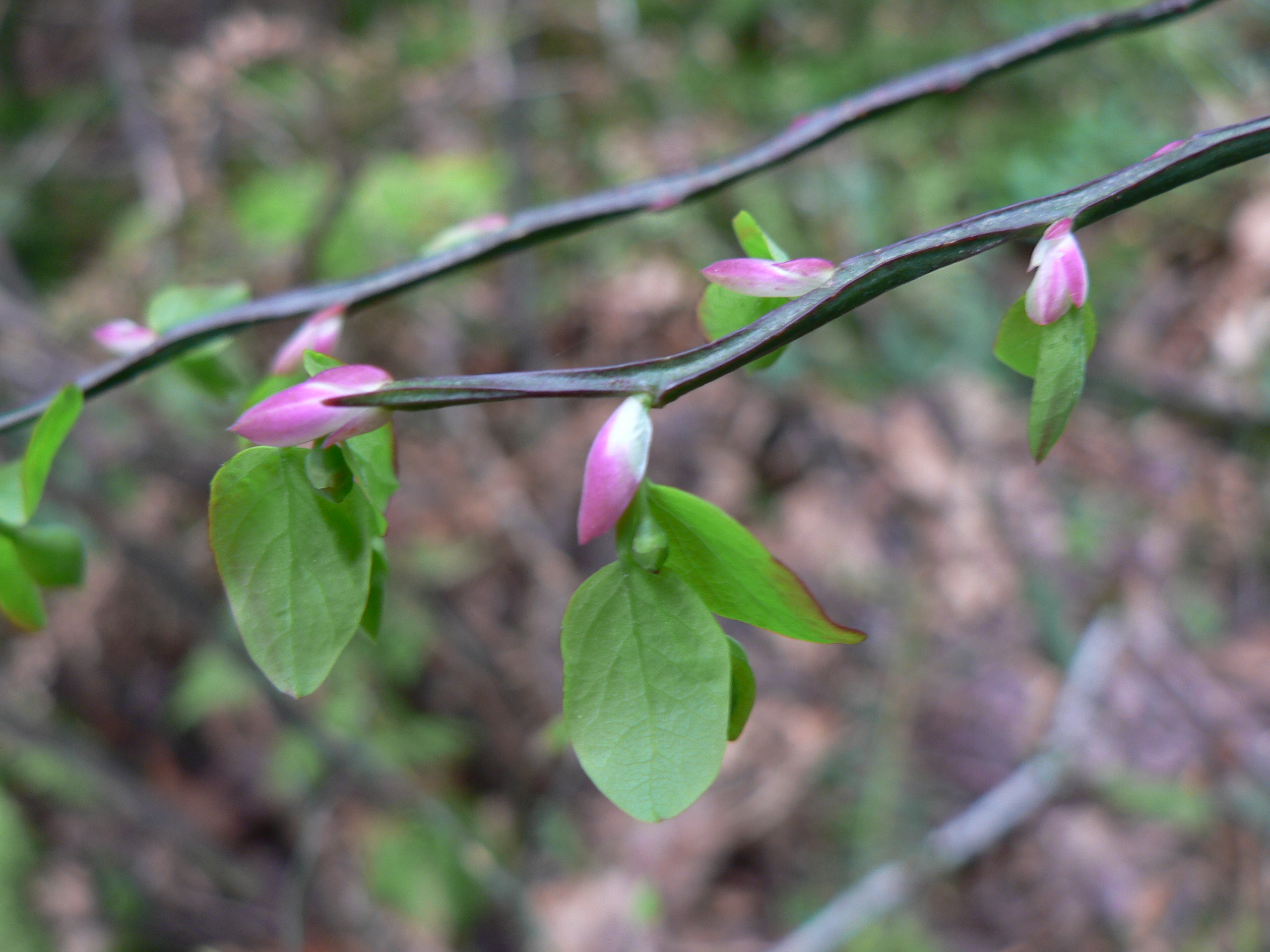
Fresh leaves and buds

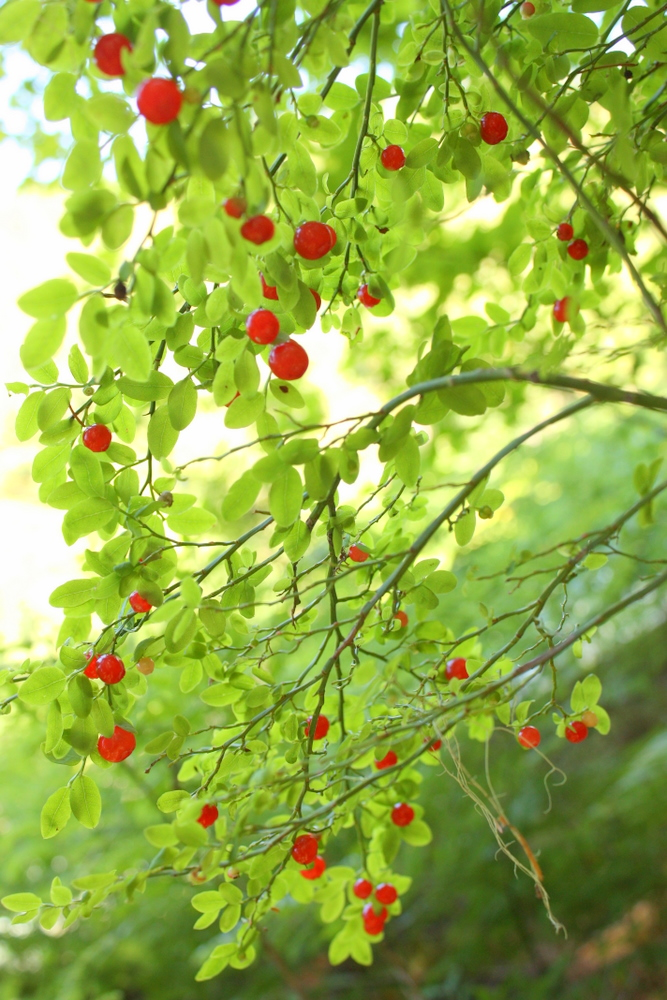
Leaves and berries

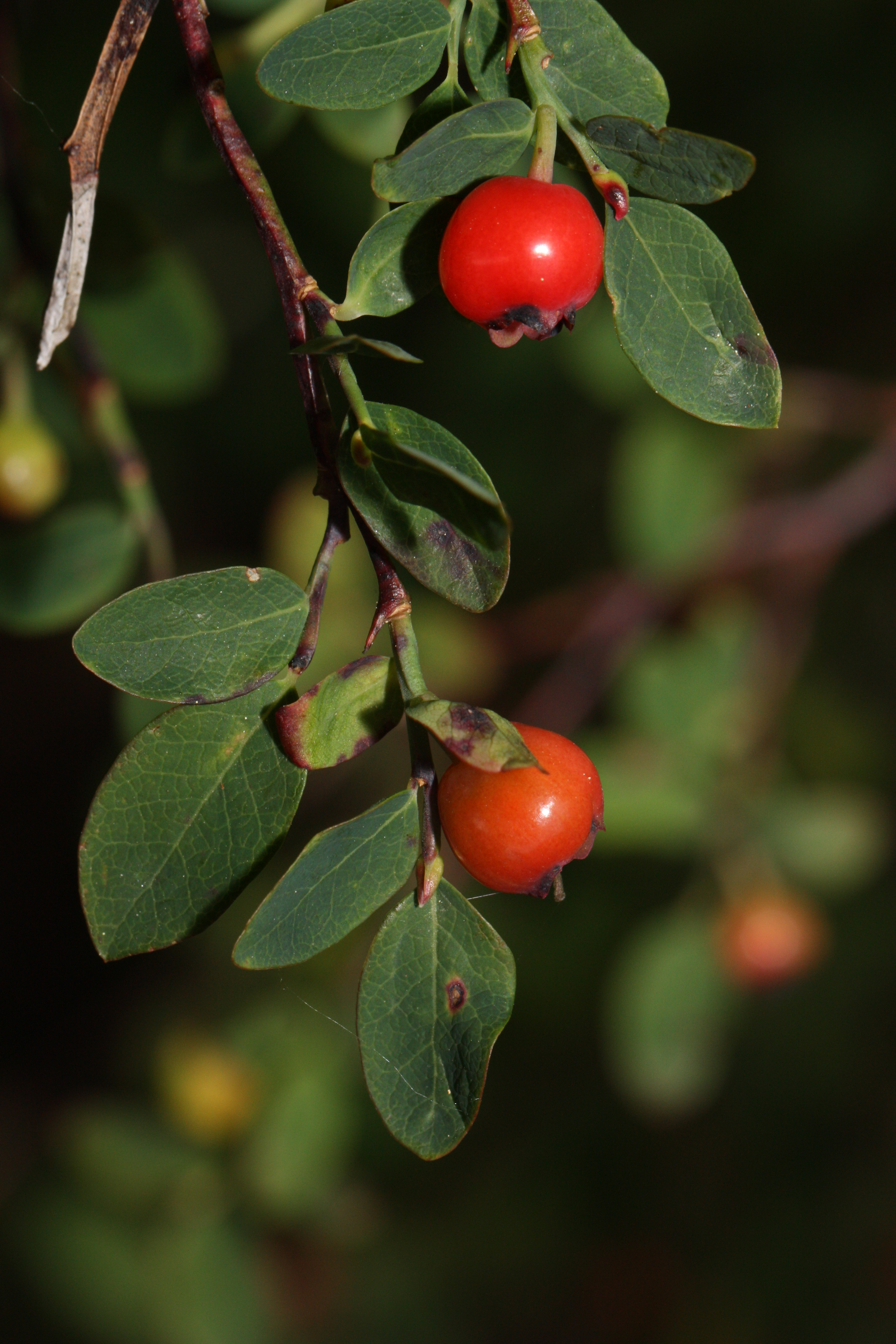
Close-up of leaves and fruit

== Distribution and habitat ==
It is common in forests from southeastern Alaska and British Columbia south through western Washington and Oregon to central California.

In the Oregon Coast Range, it is the most common species of Vaccinium. It grows in moist, shaded woodlands.

== Ecology ==
Birds, bears, and small mammals eat the berries. Deer and some livestock forage the foliage.

== Cultivation ==
The species is cultivated in the specialty horticulture trade with limited availability as an ornamental plant. It is used as a native plant for natural landscaping, habitat gardens, wildlife gardens, and restoration projects. Another cultivated species of similar size and habitats is the evergreen V. ovatum (evergreen huckleberry).

As a crop plant (along with the other huckleberries of the genus in western North America), it is not currently grown on a large commercial agriculture scale, despite efforts to make this possible. It requires acidic soil (pH of 4.5 to 6) and does not tolerate root disturbance.

== Uses ==
Huckleberries can be eaten fresh or dried or prepared as a tea or jelly.

Indigenous peoples of North America—including the Bear River Band, Karok, and Pomo tribes—found the plant and its fruit very useful. The bright red, acidic berries were used extensively for food throughout the year. Fresh berries were eaten in large quantities, or used for fish bait because of the resemblance to salmon eggs. Berries were also dried for later use. Dried berries were stewed and made into sauces, or mixed with salmon roe and oil to eat at winter feasts.

The bark or leaves of the plant were brewed for a bitter cold remedy, made as tea or smoked. The branches were used as brooms, and the twigs were used to fasten western skunk cabbage leaves into berry baskets.
