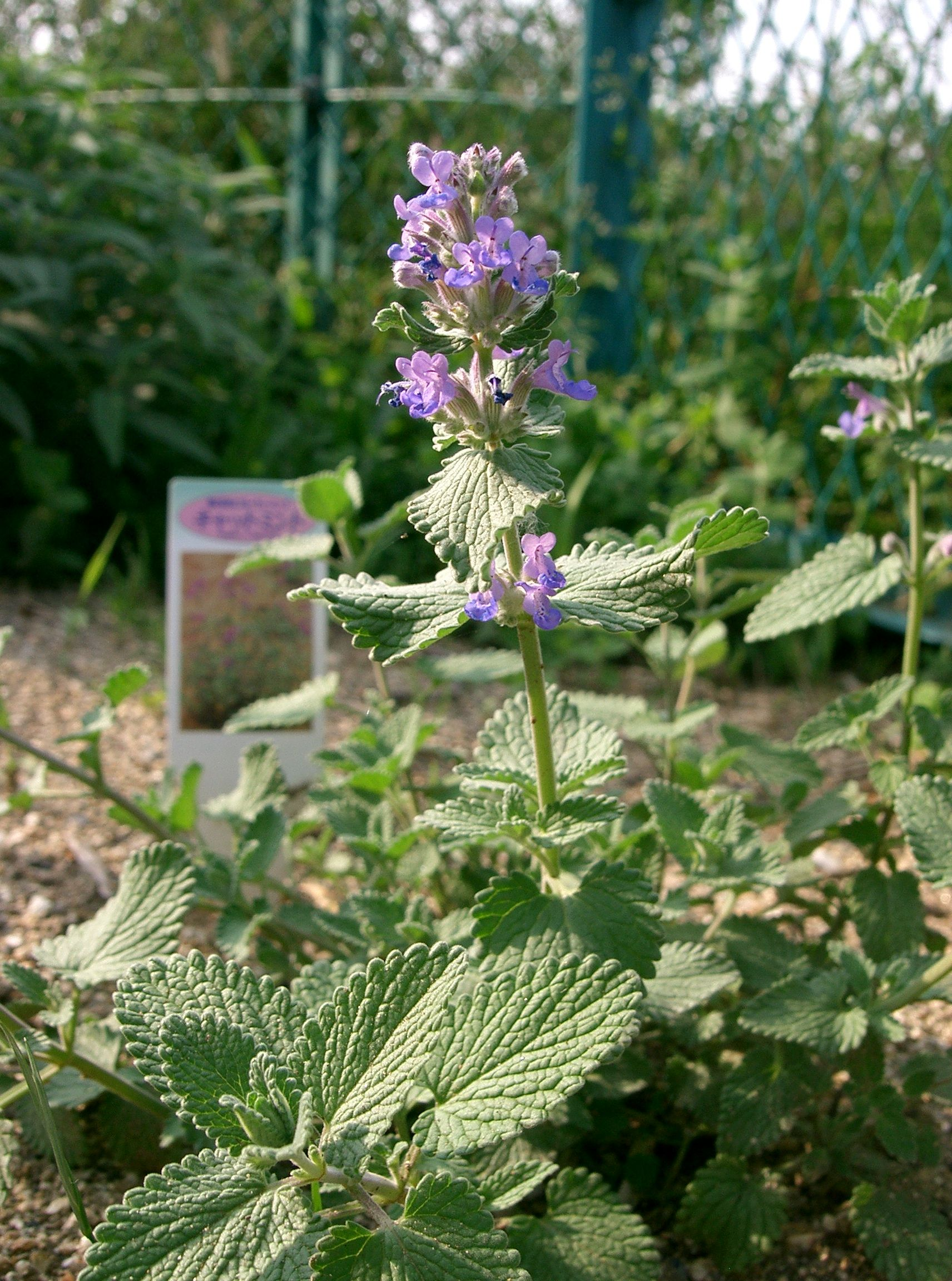

Scientific classification
- Kingdom: Plantae
- Clade: Tracheophytes
- Clade: Angiosperms
- Clade: Eudicots
- Clade: Asterids
- Order: Lamiales
- Family: Lamiaceae
- Genus: Nepeta
- Species: N. × faassenii

Binomial name
- Nepeta × faassenii Bergmans ex Stearn

= Nepeta × faassenii =

Species of flowering plant

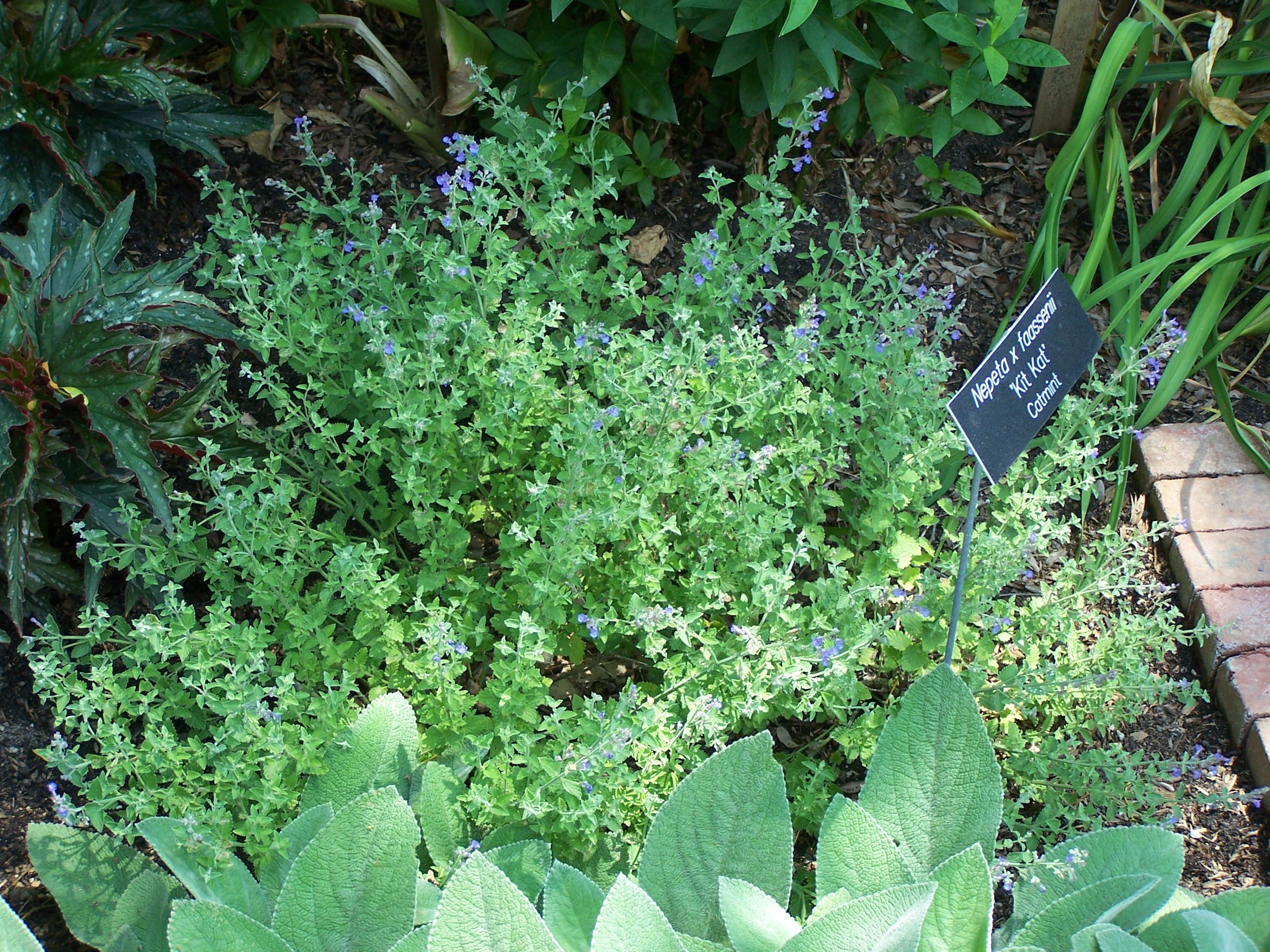
Nepeta × faassenii 'Kit Kat' catmint

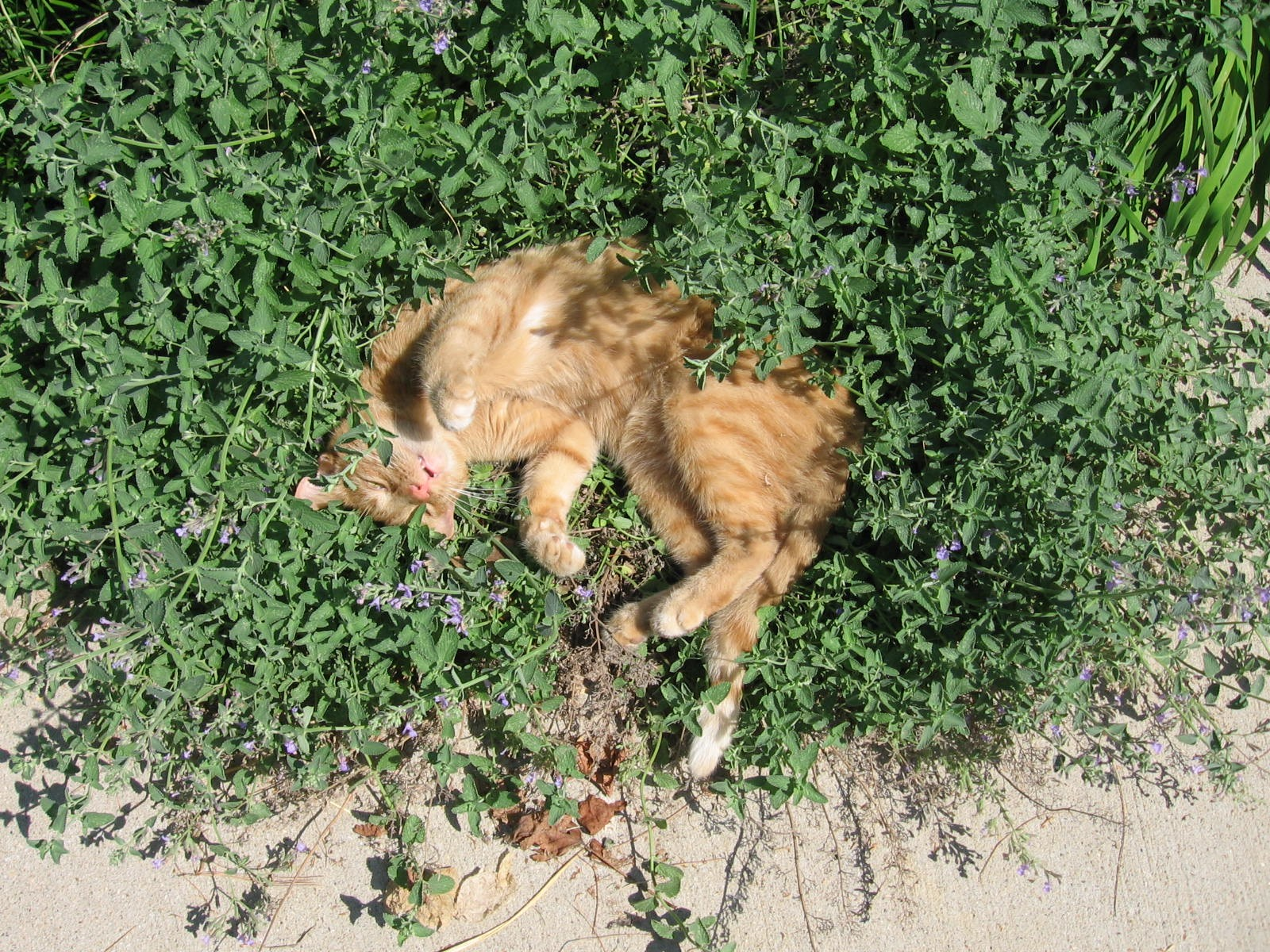
A domestic cat sleeping in a catmint plant

Nepeta × faassenii, a flowering plant also known as catmint and Faassen's catnip, is a primary hybrid of garden origin. The parent species are Nepeta racemosa and Nepeta nepetella.

It is an herbaceous perennial, with oval, opposite, intricately veined, gray—green leaves, on square stems. The foliage is fragrant. It grows from 1–2 feet (30–61 cm) tall by 1–3 feet (30–91 cm) wide.

The plant produces small but showy, abundant, two-lipped, trumpet-shaped, soft lavender flowers, from spring through autumn. Continued blooming is encouraged by deadheading. The seeds are predominantly sterile, and so the plant will not reseed as an invasive species, unlike some other Nepeta species.

== Cultivation ==
Nepeta × faassenii is cultivated for its attractive aromatic foliage and masses of blue flowers, as groundcover, border edging, or in pots or rock gardens. It is drought tolerant, and can be deer resistant. It has gained the Royal Horticultural Society's Award of Garden Merit. It was first cultivated by Faassen Nurseries in Tegelen, Netherlands, and named by Bergmans.

Cultivars

Numerous cultivars are available in the trade.

- 'Walker's Low' — silver grey foliage, lavender blue flowers, 2–2.5 feet (61–76 cm) tall by 2.5–3 feet (76–91 cm) wide, 2007 "Perennial of the Year" (by Perennial Plant Association).
- 'Jr. Walker' TM —PP 23,074, compact induced mutant of Walker low, small silver grey foliage, small lavender blue flowers, 1–1.5 feet (30–46 cm) tall by 2.5–3 feet (76–91 cm) wide, 2013 "Top Performer" (by Colorado State University Perennial Trial Garden). Bred by Michael Dobres NovaFlora LLC, introduced by Star Roses & Plants
- 'Blue Wonder' — blue flowers, "Missouri Botanical Garden Plant of Merit".
- 'Select Blue' — noticeably bluer flowers, 15–18 inches (38–46 cm) wide.
- 'Six Hills Giant' — periwinkle blue flowers, 2–3 feet (61–91 cm) tall.
