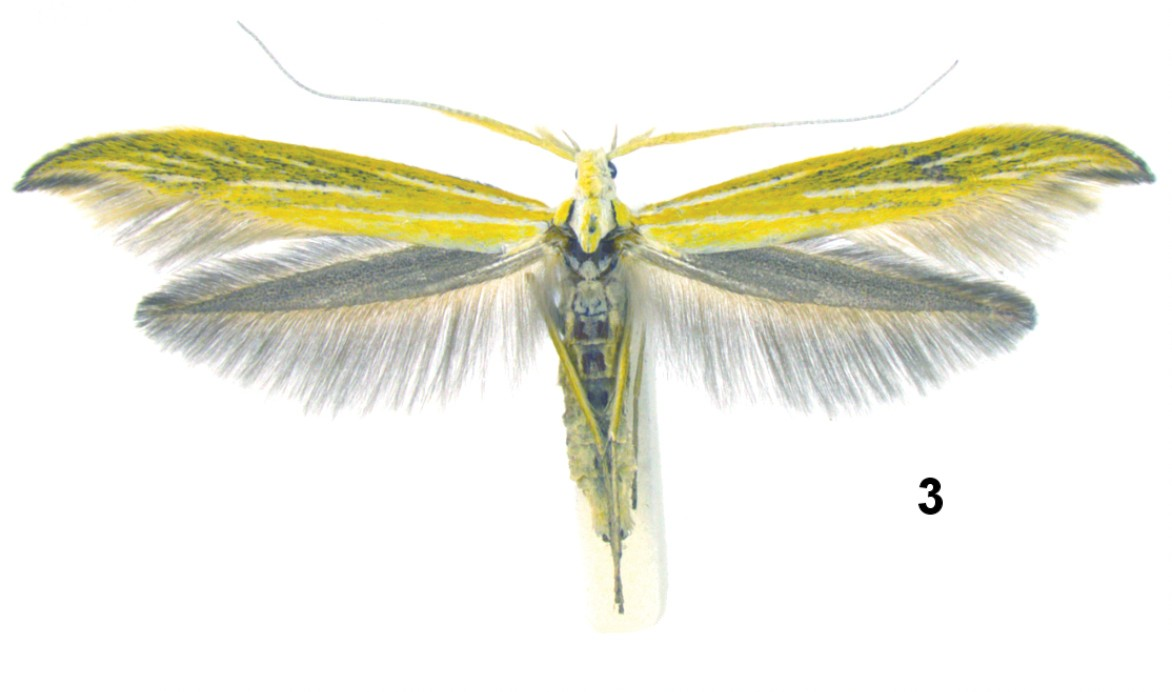

Scientific classification
- Kingdom: Animalia
- Phylum: Arthropoda
- Clade: Pancrustacea
- Class: Insecta
- Order: Lepidoptera
- Family: Coleophoridae
- Genus: Coleophora
- Species: C. nepetellae

Binomial name
- Coleophora nepetellae Baldizzone & Nel, 2014

= Coleophora nepetellae =

Species of moth

Coleophora nepetellae is a moth of the family Coleophoridae. It is found in Italy (Piemont Region) and France, where it has been recorded from the Alpes-Maritimes, Upper Var, Alpes-de-Haute-Provence, Hautes-Alpes, Isère, the Drôme, and further to the west from the Vaucluse where it is common on the slopes of Mont Ventoux wherever Nepeta nepetella grows.

The wingspan is 22–26 mm. The ground colour of the forewings are cream yellow, but paler in the dorsal half. The costal half is slightly darker due to a scattering of brown scales, mainly in the area between the median line and the costa. There are four to five short, oblique silvery striae in the apical portion and one fine silvery stria in the subcostal area near the base, widening to a quarter of the wing and lined with brown on the costal side. A second silvery stria is found in the median area from the basal third to the margin and a third silvery stria along the anal fold and interrupted before the margin. The fourth silvery stria is found along the dorsal margin. The hindwings are grey, sometimes with a brownish hue. There is one generation per year, with adults emerging between mid-July and the first week of August in the Valle Varaita in Italy. In France at higher elevations adult emergence extends into the middle of August. In all locations adult flight coincides with the flowering of the host plant. The adults fly in bright sunshine, especially during the afternoon and take short flights among the flowering stems.

The larvae initially feed on Nepeta nepetella. This is the food plant from which the larva makes its first case. The second host plant which serves to construct the final case is an unidentified Poaceae.

== Etymology ==
The species name is derived from the species name of the larval host, Nepeta nepetella.
