= Nepeta italica subsp. troodi =

Scientific classification
- Kingdom: Plantae
- Clade: Tracheophytes
- Clade: Angiosperms
- Clade: Eudicots
- Clade: Asterids
- Order: Lamiales
- Family: Lamiaceae
- Genus: Nepeta
- Species: N. italica
- Subspecies: N. i. subsp. troodi

Trinomial name
- Nepeta italica subsp. troodi (Holmboe) A.L.Budantsev

Synonyms
- Nepeta troodi Holmboe

Subspecies of flowering plant

Nepeta italica subsp. troodi, synonym Nepeta troodi, commonly known as Troodos cat-mint is a suberect, aromatic, perennial herb, 20–50 cm high, with a woody base and hairy tetragonal shoots. The leaves are opposite, simple, serrate, cordate at the base, deltoid, with an obtuse apex, 1-4 x 0.6–2 cm, petiolate, densely hairy. The flowers are arranged in many flowered verticillasters, and are zygomorphic, with a white corolla white and a dotted purple lower lip. It flowers June to October. The fruit is composed of 4 nutlets.

== Distribution and habitat ==
The subspecies is endemic to Cyprus where it is confined to the higher peaks of Troödos where it is not uncommon: Khnionistra, Prodromos, Troodos Square, Loumata Aeton, Xerocolymbos, and Papoutsa. It is found on rocky slopes, in forest clearings or under pines on igneous rocks, at altitudes of 1100–1950 m.
