= Nepeta depauperata =

Scientific classification
- Kingdom: Plantae
- Clade: Tracheophytes
- Clade: Angiosperms
- Clade: Eudicots
- Clade: Asterids
- Order: Lamiales
- Family: Lamiaceae
- Genus: Nepeta
- Species: N. depauperata

Binomial name
- Nepeta depauperata (Benth, 1848)

Synonyms
- Glechoma depauperata Benth, 1891; Lophanthus depauperatus Benth, 1941

Species of plant

Nepeta depauperata is a species of Catmint found in Iran. There are few records of its presence formally recorded, but its range is apparently quite restricted.

== Ethnobotany ==
Iranian traditional medicine has employed the use of Nepeta depauperata as an anti-inflammatory herb. Western research has corroborated this, citing its ability to minimize both acute and chronic nociception. While oil extracted from many species within this genus contain nepetalactones as the main component, N. depauperata oil is a majority spathulenol (31.8%) and caryophyllenes (23.2%).
