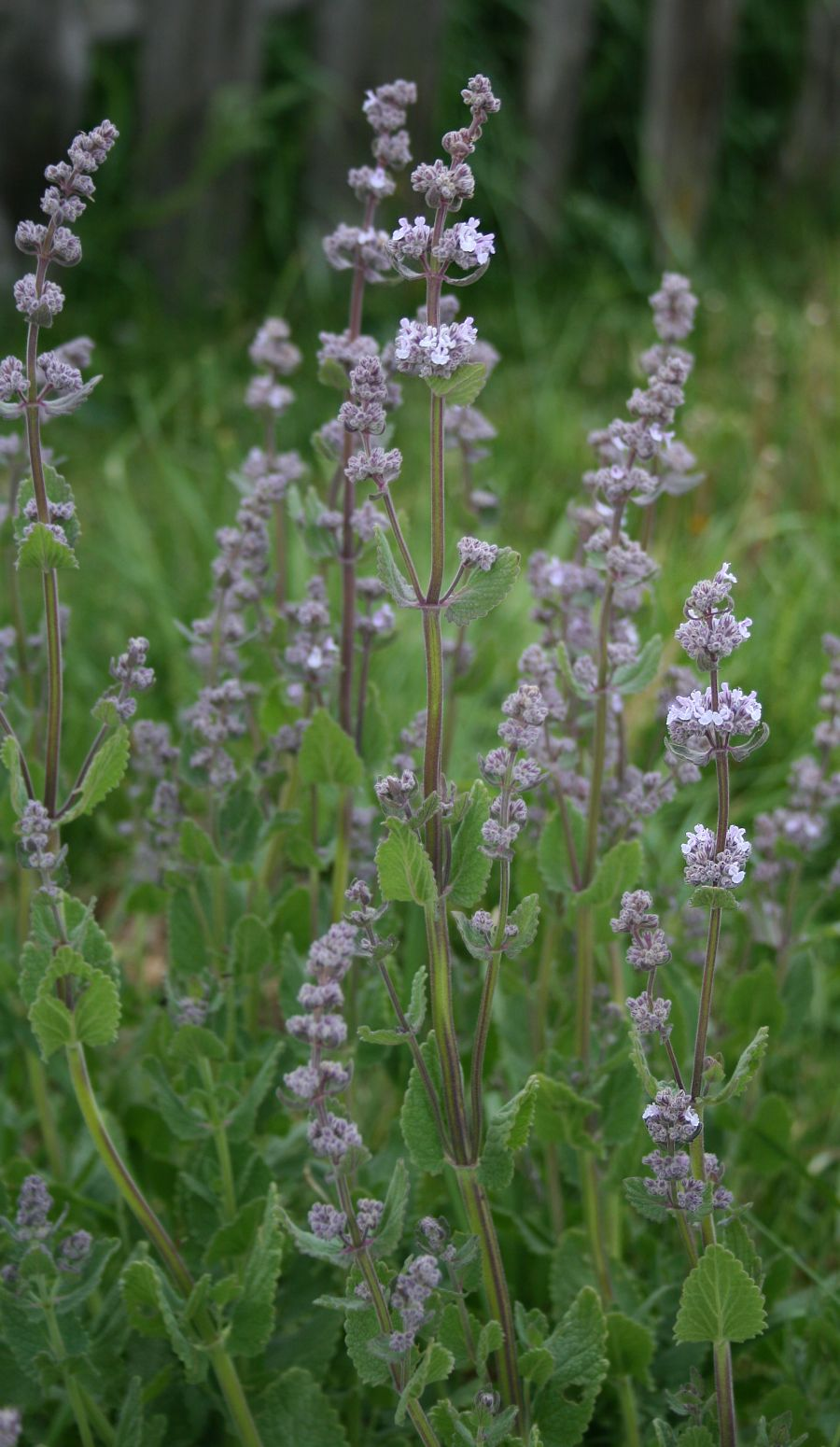
- Nepeta nuda subsp. nuda
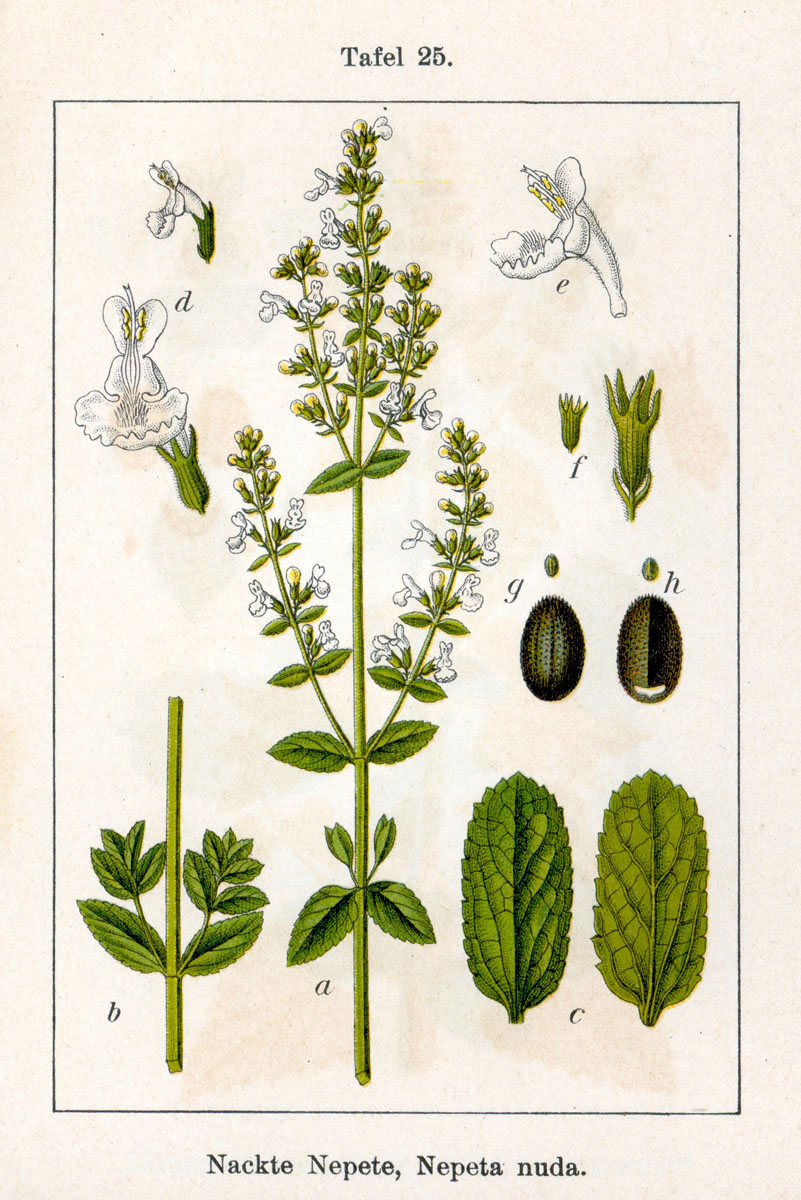

Scientific classification
- Kingdom: Plantae
- Clade: Tracheophytes
- Clade: Angiosperms
- Clade: Eudicots
- Clade: Asterids
- Order: Lamiales
- Family: Lamiaceae
- Genus: Nepeta
- Species: N. nuda

Binomial name
- Nepeta nuda L.

Synonyms
- Nepeta pannonica L.; Cataria nuda (L.) Moench; Glechoma nuda (L.) Kuntze

= Nepeta nuda =

Species of flowering plant

Nepeta nuda is a species of flowering plant in the family Lamiaceae. It is native to the continents of Europe and Asia, its occurrence ranging from Western Europe to Western and Central Asia.

== Taxonomy ==
The species was first formally described by famous botanist Carl Linnaeus in 1753 under its current binomial name.

=== Etymology ===
The Latin specific epithet nuda means "naked, bare", which refers to the distinct lack of hairs, also called trichomes, on its stems, which is typical of commonly known related species such as Nepeta cataria.

== Description ==
A herbaceous perennial, typically grows up to 50–120 cm high.

Stems are multiple and erect, which together reach heights as mentioned above.

Leaves are oblong-obovate, oblong-elliptic to lanceolate, the adaxial side is greenish and sparsely puberulent or nearly hairless while the abaxial side is pale in color and pubescent, margin crenate or serrate.

Cymes are 5-11 flowered in narrow long panicles. Flowers bloom from July to September.

Fruits are in form of nutlets with the apex minutely tuberculate and sparsely hairy.

== Habitats ==
Xeric shrublands, forbs, grasslands below the forest zone, mountain basins, mountain ranges at elevations ranging from 1300 to 2400 meters above sea level.

== Subtaxa ==
The following subspecies are accepted:

• Nepeta nuda subsp. nuda

• Nepeta nuda subsp. albiflora (Boiss.) Gams

• Nepeta nuda subsp. glandulifera ub.-Mor. & P.H.Davis

• Nepeta nuda subsp. lydiae P.H.Davis

== Uses ==
=== Medicinal ===
Used mainly as a herbal tea, with a slightly pungent aroma described as "between citrus and peppermint". In traditional medicine, used to treat hysteria and melancholy and uterine cramps. Aside from this, it's also used internally as a decoction against cystitis and prostate gland inflammation, and externally to treat wounds and against mastitis in livestock.

=== As a natural herbicide ===
The species and its subspecies were tested for potential applications as a bioherbicide due to their genotoxic (corn seeds), phytotoxic (wheat and cucumber) and herbicidal (wheat, radish, lettuce, cress and purslane) effects on various crops in form of essential oil or water extracts, in most cases delivering satisfactory results and being taken into consideration as a potential candidate for weed control.
