= Nepeta discolor =

Scientific classification
- Kingdom: Plantae
- Clade: Tracheophytes
- Clade: Angiosperms
- Clade: Eudicots
- Clade: Asterids
- Order: Lamiales
- Family: Lamiaceae
- Genus: Nepeta
- Species: N. discolor

Binomial name
- Nepeta discolor Royle ex Benth.

Species of flowering plant

Nepeta discolor is a low-growing species of catnip that is commonly found in the alpine (Himalayas) and temperate regions of Tibet in China; Garhwal division, Himachal Pradesh, Jammu, Uttar Pradesh in India; Afghanistan; Pakistan; and Nepal. The species is named after the color of the leaves. It was described in 1833.
