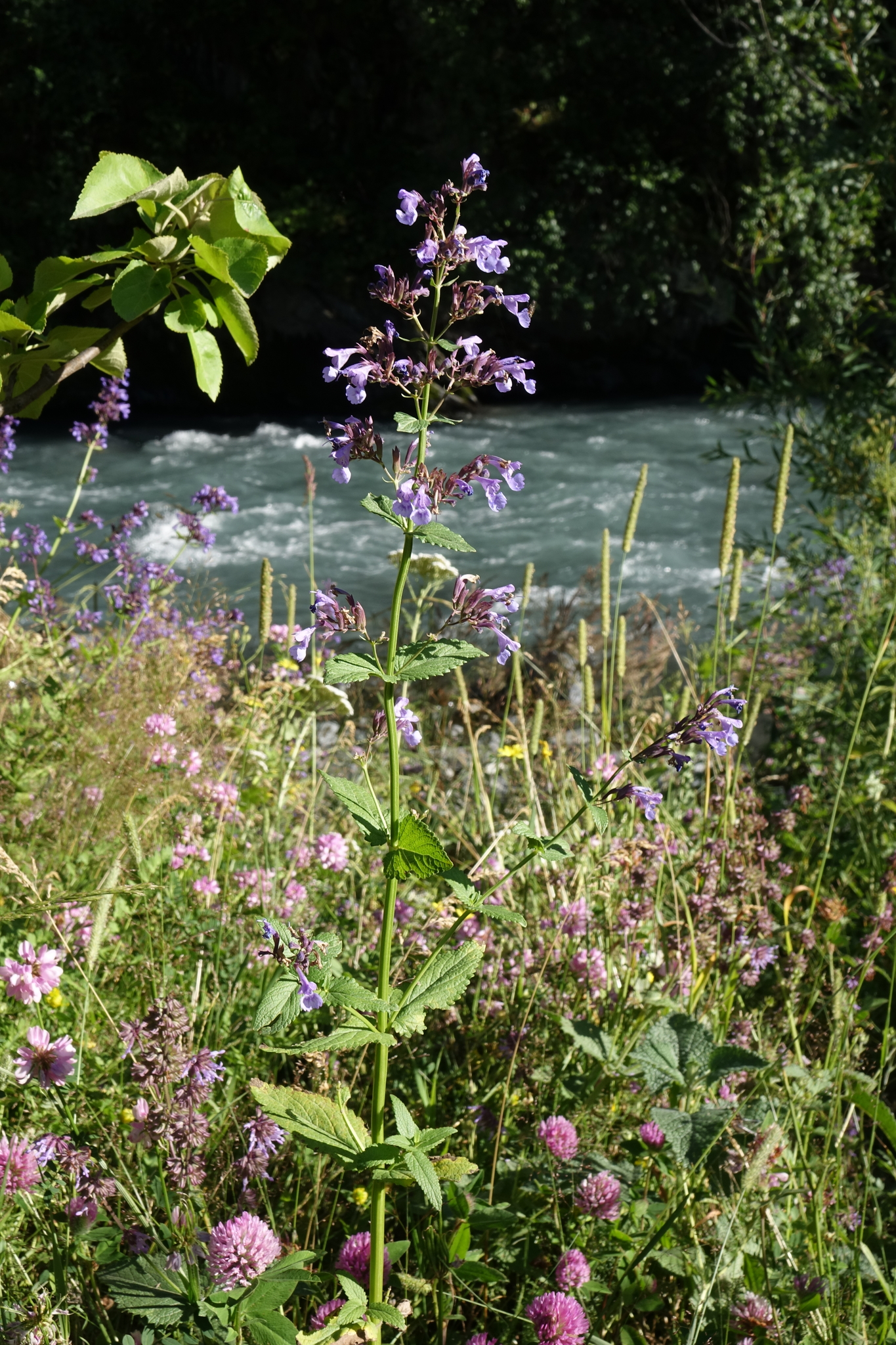
- Tlyaratinsky District, Dagestan

Scientific classification
- Kingdom: Plantae
- Clade: Tracheophytes
- Clade: Angiosperms
- Clade: Eudicots
- Clade: Asterids
- Order: Lamiales
- Family: Lamiaceae
- Genus: Nepeta
- Species: N. grandiflora

Binomial name
- Nepeta grandiflora M.Bieb.

Synonyms
- Glechoma grandiflora; Nepeta grandiflora var. glabrata

= Nepeta grandiflora =

Plant species in the mint family

Nepeta grandiflora is a species of flowering plant in the mint family Lamiaceae, native to the Caucasus. Growing to 75 cm (30 in) tall by 30 cm (12 in), it is a clump-forming, erect deciduous herbaceous perennial with aromatic, slightly hairy, grey-green leaves, and spikes of purple/blue flowers in early summer.

N. grandiflora and its cultivars are widely grown as ornamental garden plants which are useful for the middle of a flower border in full sun. The cultivar 'Bramdean' has gained the Royal Horticultural Society's Award of Garden Merit.

== Taxonomy ==
Nepeta grandiflora is classified as a member of the Nepeta genus in the Lamiaceae. It has no subspecies or botanical varieties. It was scientifically described and named by Friedrich August Marschall von Bieberstein in 1808.
