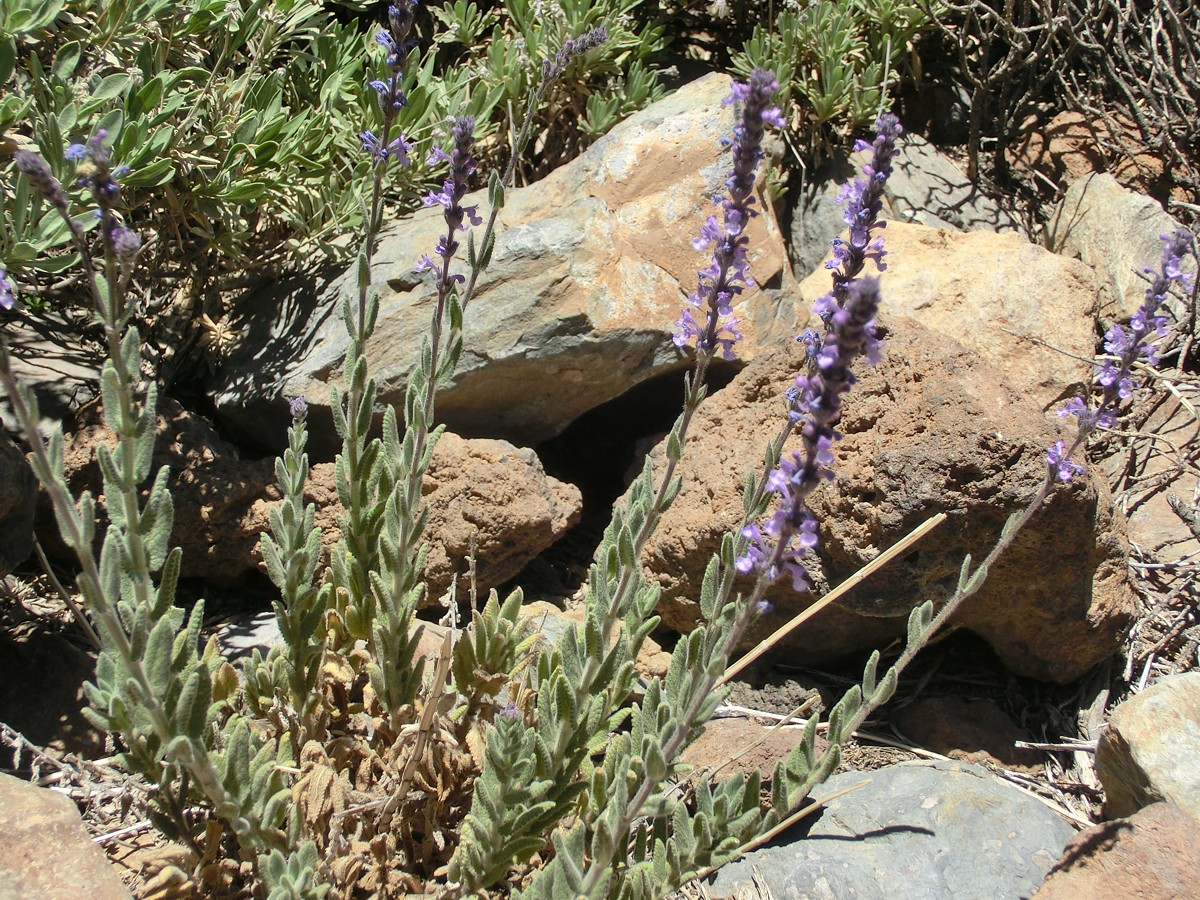

Scientific classification
- Kingdom: Plantae
- Clade: Tracheophytes
- Clade: Angiosperms
- Clade: Eudicots
- Clade: Asterids
- Order: Lamiales
- Family: Lamiaceae
- Genus: Nepeta
- Species: N. teydea

Binomial name
- Nepeta teydea Webb & Berthel.

Synonyms
- Glechoma teydea (Webb & Berthel.) Kuntze

= Nepeta teydea =

Species of flowering plant

Nepeta teydea is a species of flowering plant in the family Lamiaceae, native to the Canary Islands. It was first described by Philip Barker-Webb and Sabin Berthelot.

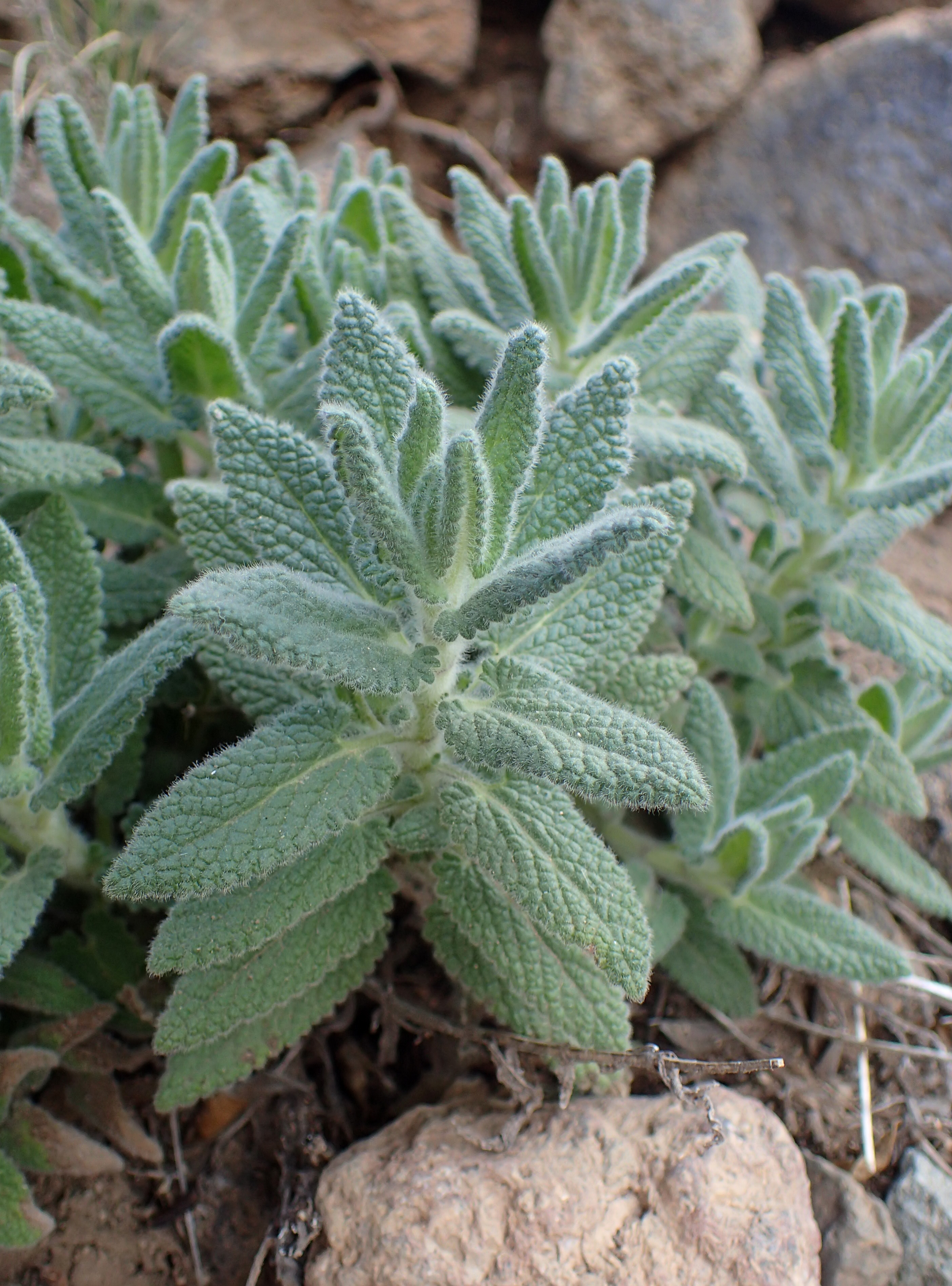
Foliage

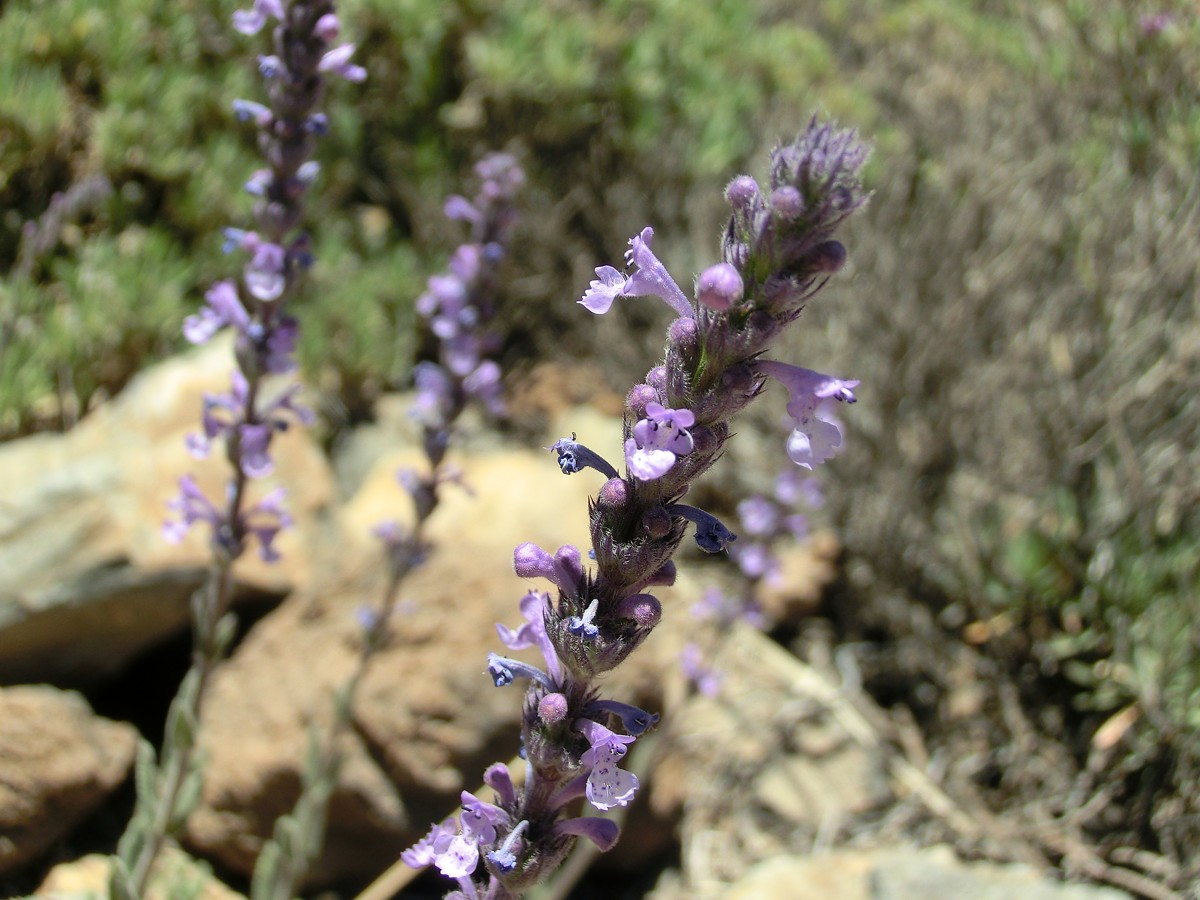
Flowers
