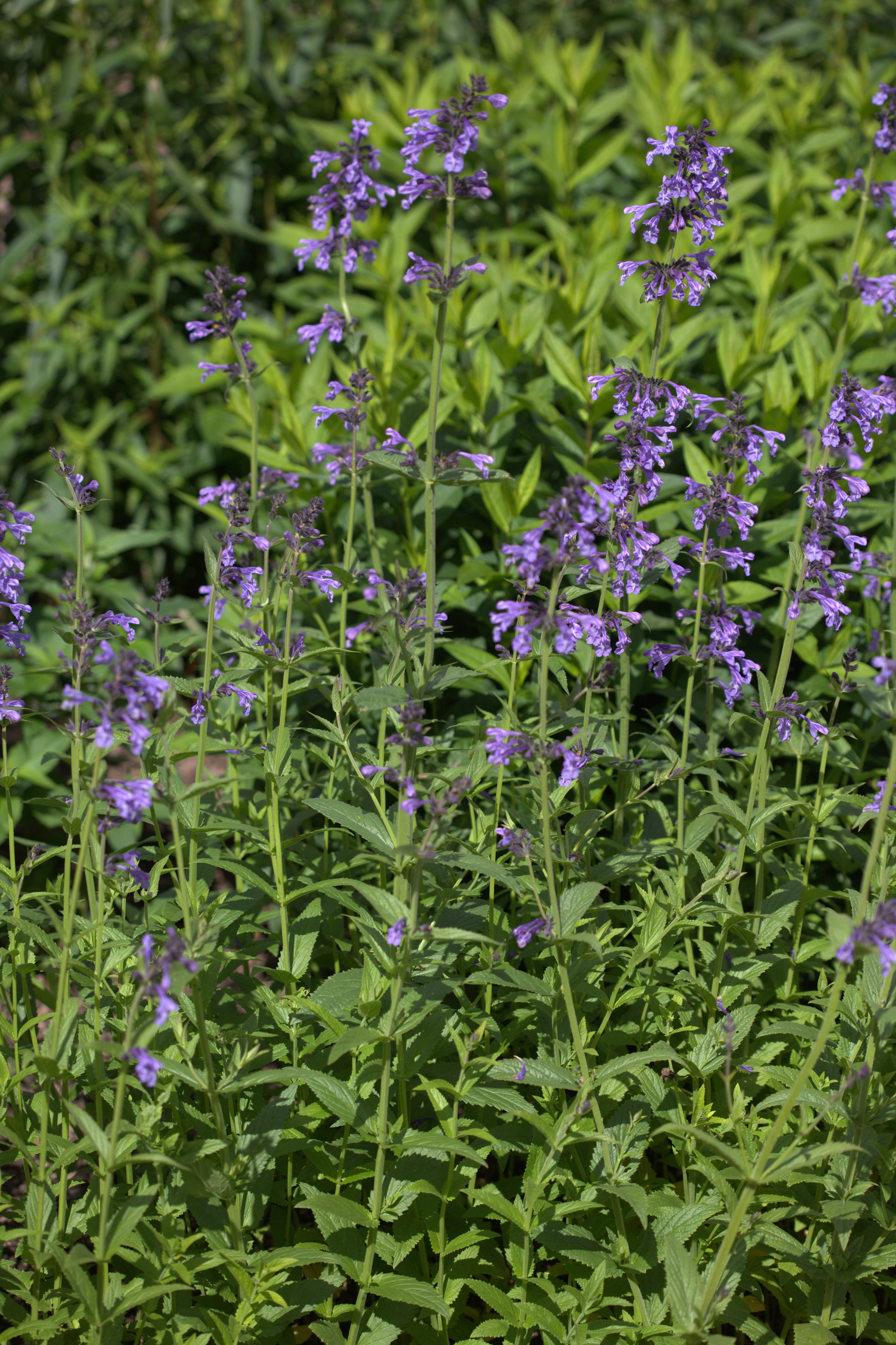

Scientific classification
- Kingdom: Plantae
- Clade: Tracheophytes
- Clade: Angiosperms
- Clade: Eudicots
- Clade: Asterids
- Order: Lamiales
- Family: Lamiaceae
- Genus: Nepeta
- Species: N. sibirica

Binomial name
- Nepeta sibirica L.

Synonyms
- Dracocephalum sibiricum (L.); Glechoma sibirica (L.) Kuntze; Moldavica elata Moench; Moldavica sibirica Moench ex Steud.; Nepeta macrantha Fisch.

= Nepeta sibirica =

Species of flowering plant

Nepeta sibirica, the Siberian catmint, is a species of flowering plant in the mint family Lamiaceae, native to Siberia.

Growing to 1 m (3.3 ft) tall by 1.5 m (4.9 ft) broad, it is an erect aromatic herbaceous perennial with whorls of violet flowers for an extended period in summer. The synonym Dracocephalum sibiricum indicates the shape of the flowers, which resemble a dragon's head.

It prefers a well-drained, moist soil in a sunny southerly or westerly aspect.

The cultivar 'Souvenir d'André Chaudon' has gained the Royal Horticultural Society's Award of Garden Merit.

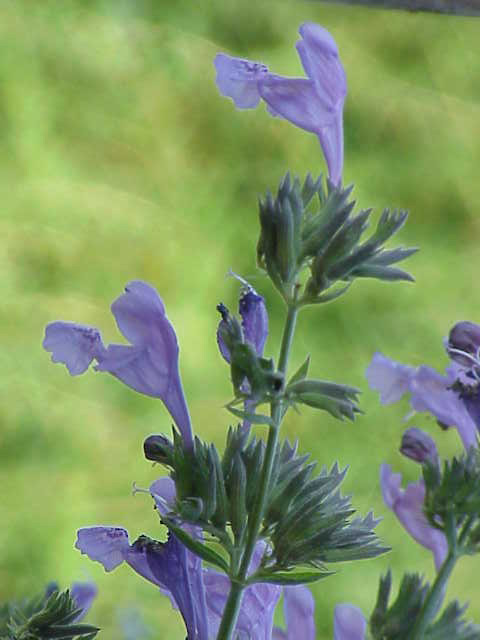

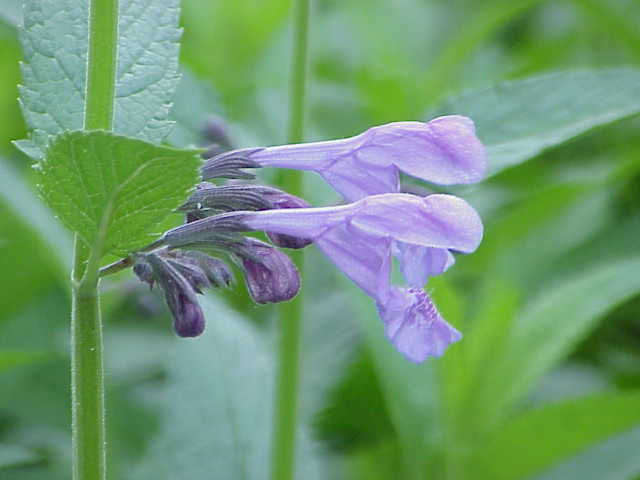
