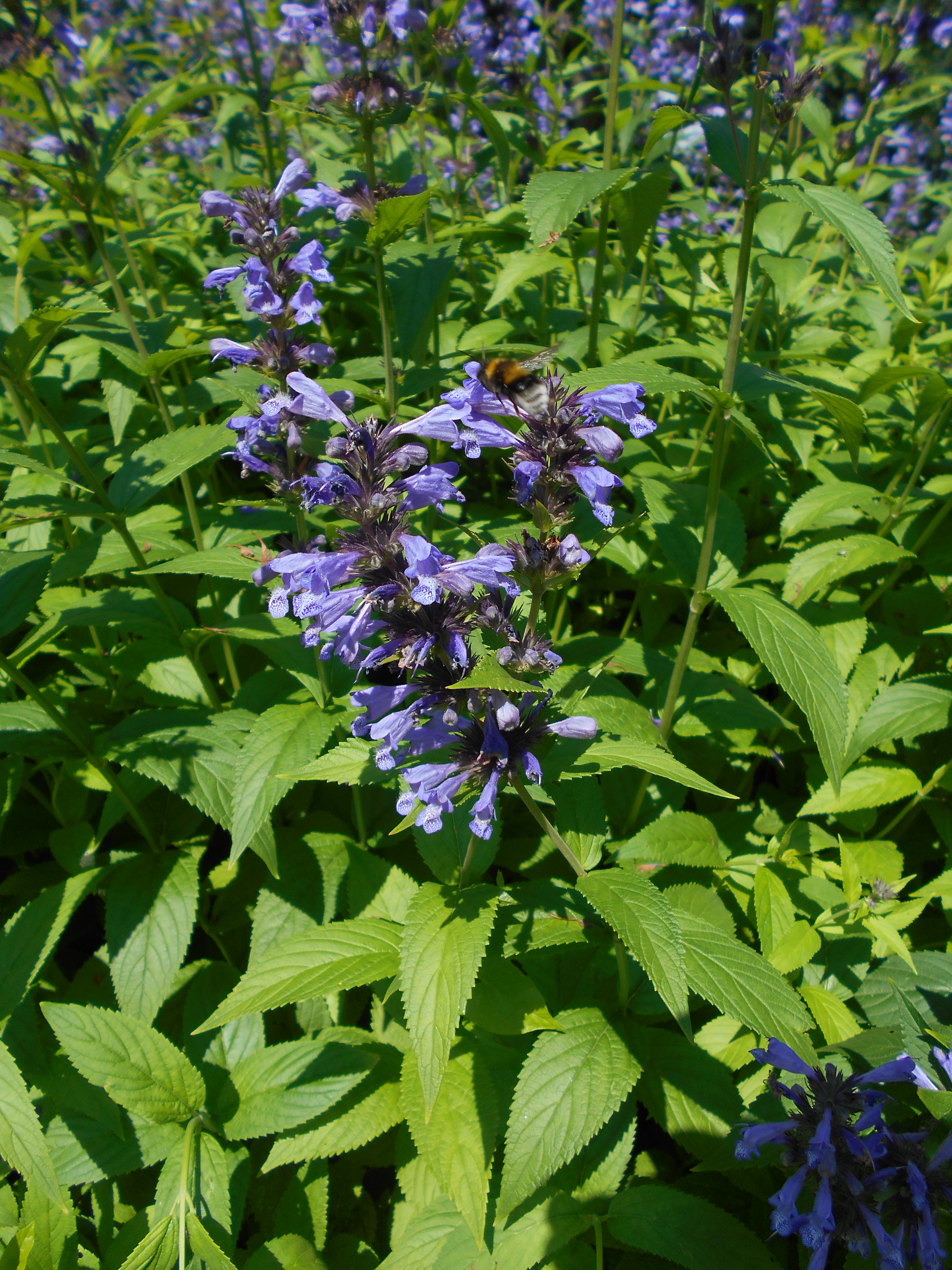
- In Wojsławice Arboretum, Poland
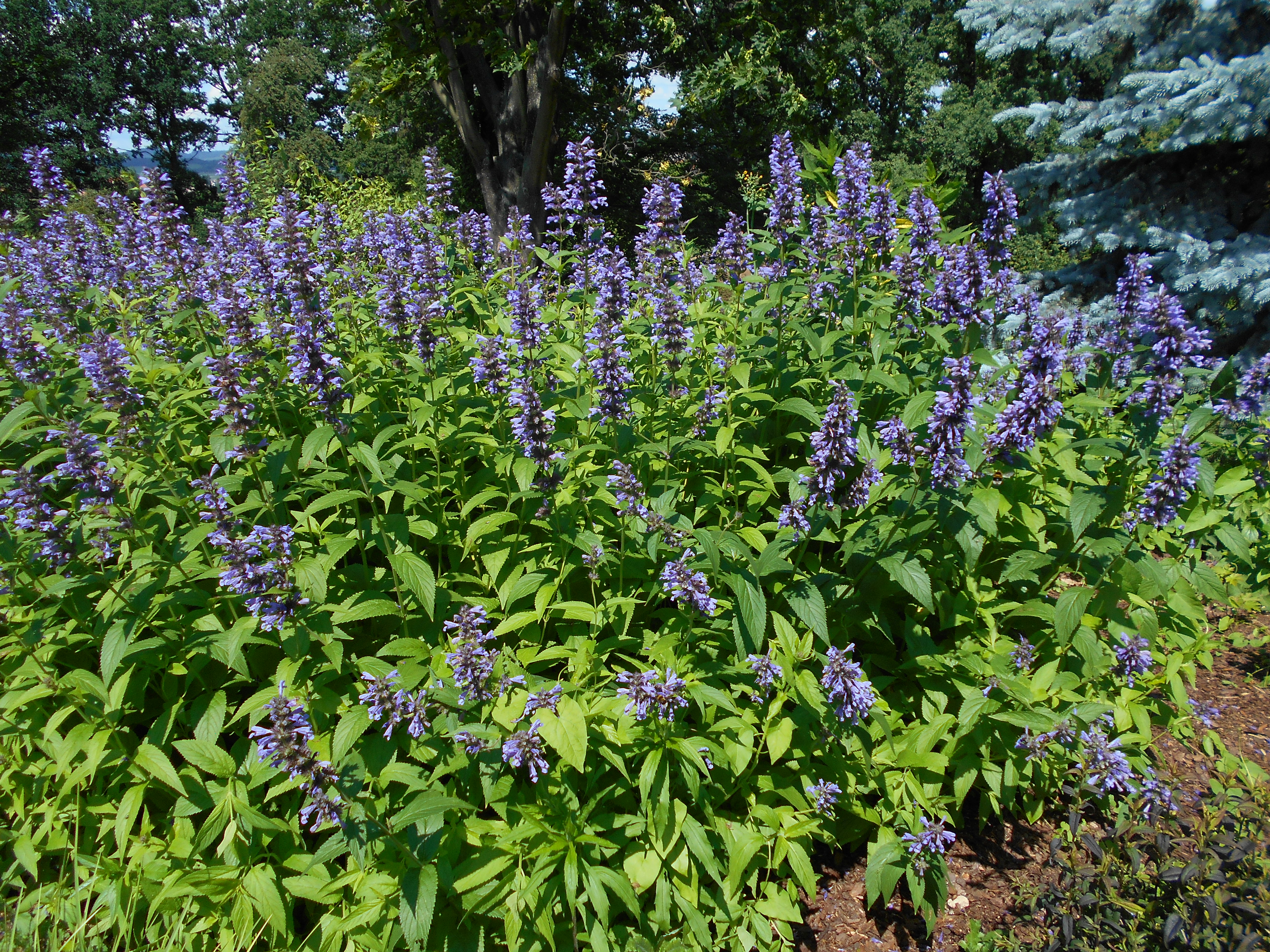
- Mass effect

Scientific classification
- Kingdom: Plantae
- Clade: Tracheophytes
- Clade: Angiosperms
- Clade: Eudicots
- Clade: Asterids
- Order: Lamiales
- Family: Lamiaceae
- Genus: Nepeta
- Species: N. cyanea

Binomial name
- Nepeta cyanea Steven

Synonyms
- List: Glechoma cyanea (Steven) Kuntze; Glechoma ruprechtiana (Boiss.) Kuntze; Nepeta acinifolia Spreng.; Nepeta biebersteiniana (Trautv.) Pojark.; Nepeta cyanea var. biebersteiniana Trautv.; Nepeta incana M.Bieb.; Nepeta kubanica Pojark.; Nepeta mollissima Tausch; Nepeta ruprechtiana Boiss.

= Nepeta cyanea =

Species of plant

Nepeta cyanea, the blue-flowered catmint, is a species of flowering plant in the family Lamiaceae. It is native to the Caucasus, and it has been introduced to Germany. A clump-forming herbaceous perennial reaching 80 cm (30 in), it has gained the Royal Horticultural Society's Award of Garden Merit. With aromatic foliage and requiring full sun, it is available from commercial suppliers as a garden plant.

== Subtaxa ==
The following subspecies are accepted:

- Nepeta cyanea subsp. biebersteiniana (Trautv.) A.L.Budantzev – North Caucasus
- Nepeta cyanea subsp. cyanea – entire range, introduced to Germany
