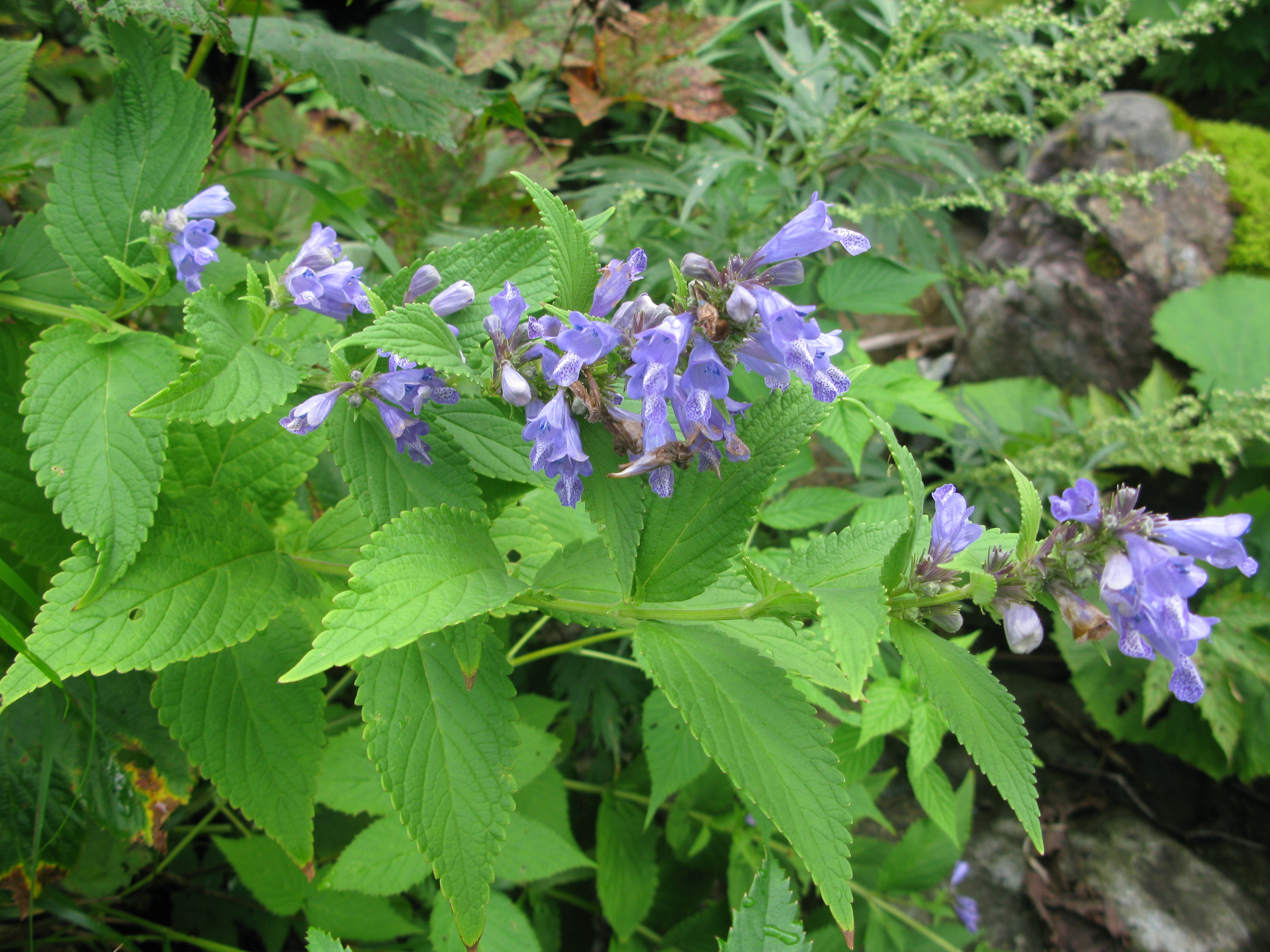

Scientific classification
- Kingdom: Plantae
- Clade: Tracheophytes
- Clade: Angiosperms
- Clade: Eudicots
- Clade: Asterids
- Order: Lamiales
- Family: Lamiaceae
- Genus: Nepeta
- Species: N. subsessilis

Binomial name
- Nepeta subsessilis Maxim.

= Nepeta subsessilis =

Species of flowering plant

Nepeta subsessilis, the short-stalked catmint, is a species of flowering plant in the mint family Lamiaceae, from Japan. Growing to 100 cm (39 in) tall by 50 cm (20 in) broad, it is an erect herbaceous perennial with fresh, aromatic green leaves and soft blue flowers in summer and autumn. It is more compact and erect, with larger flowers, than other members of Nepeta. It may also have a similar effect on cats.

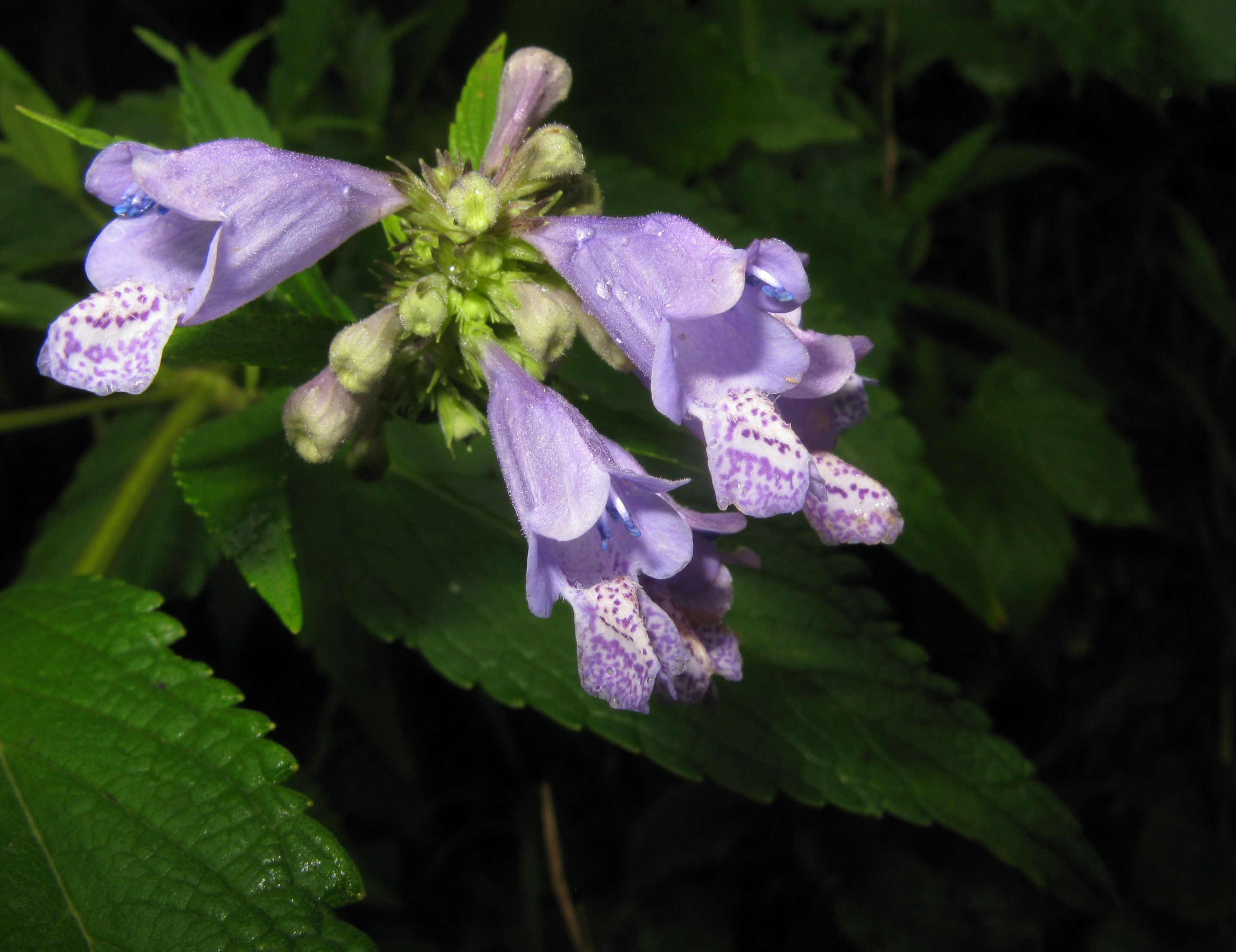

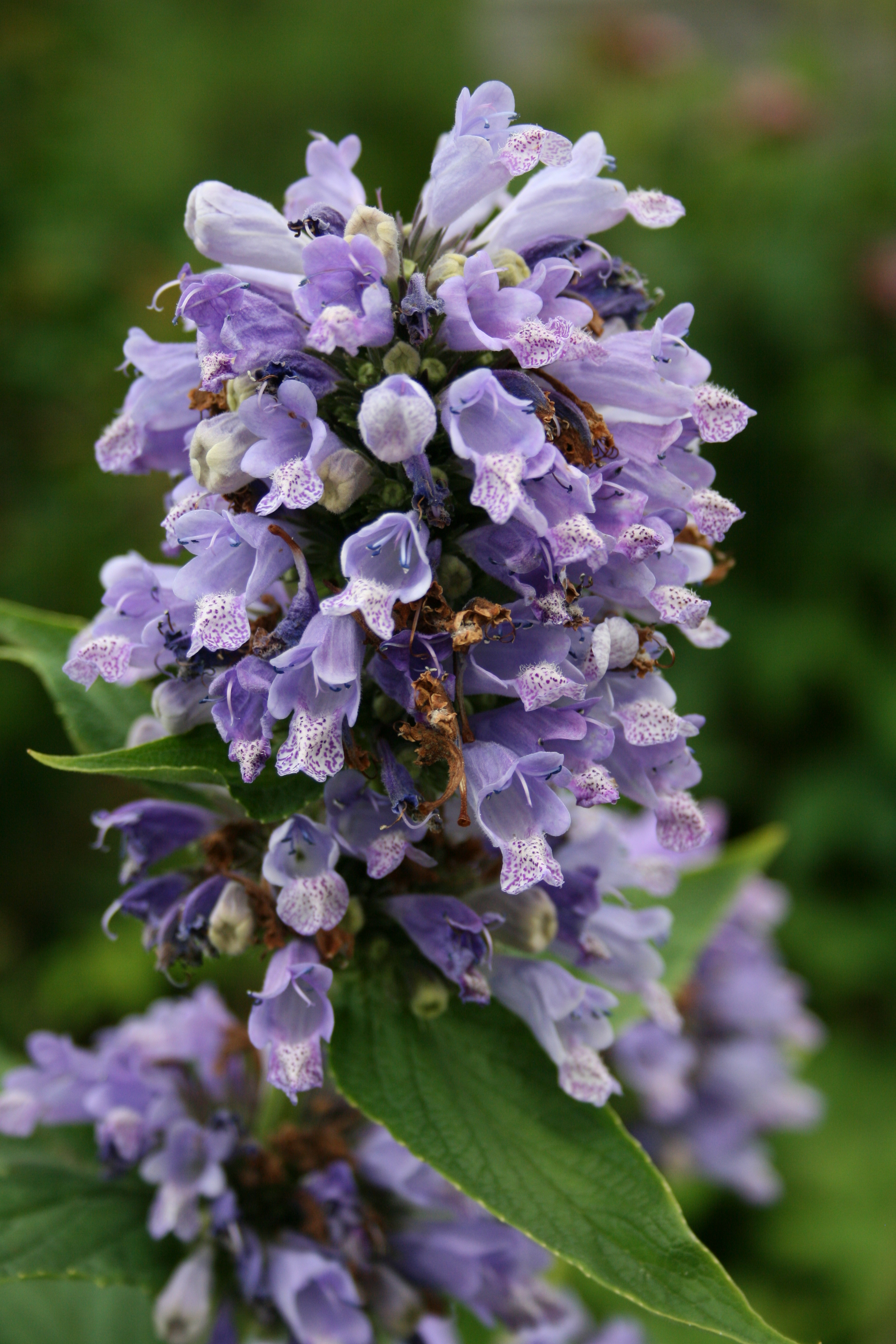

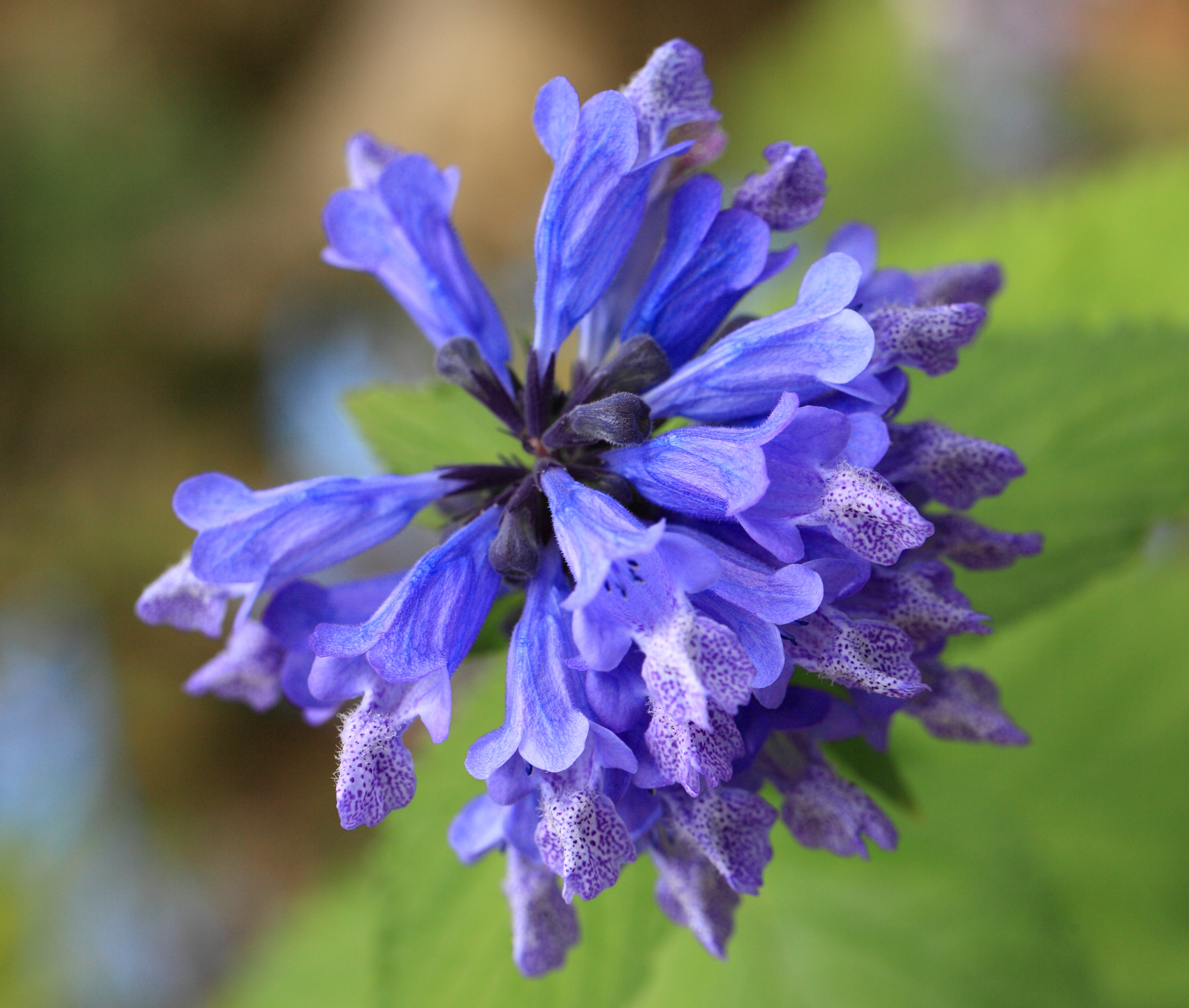
