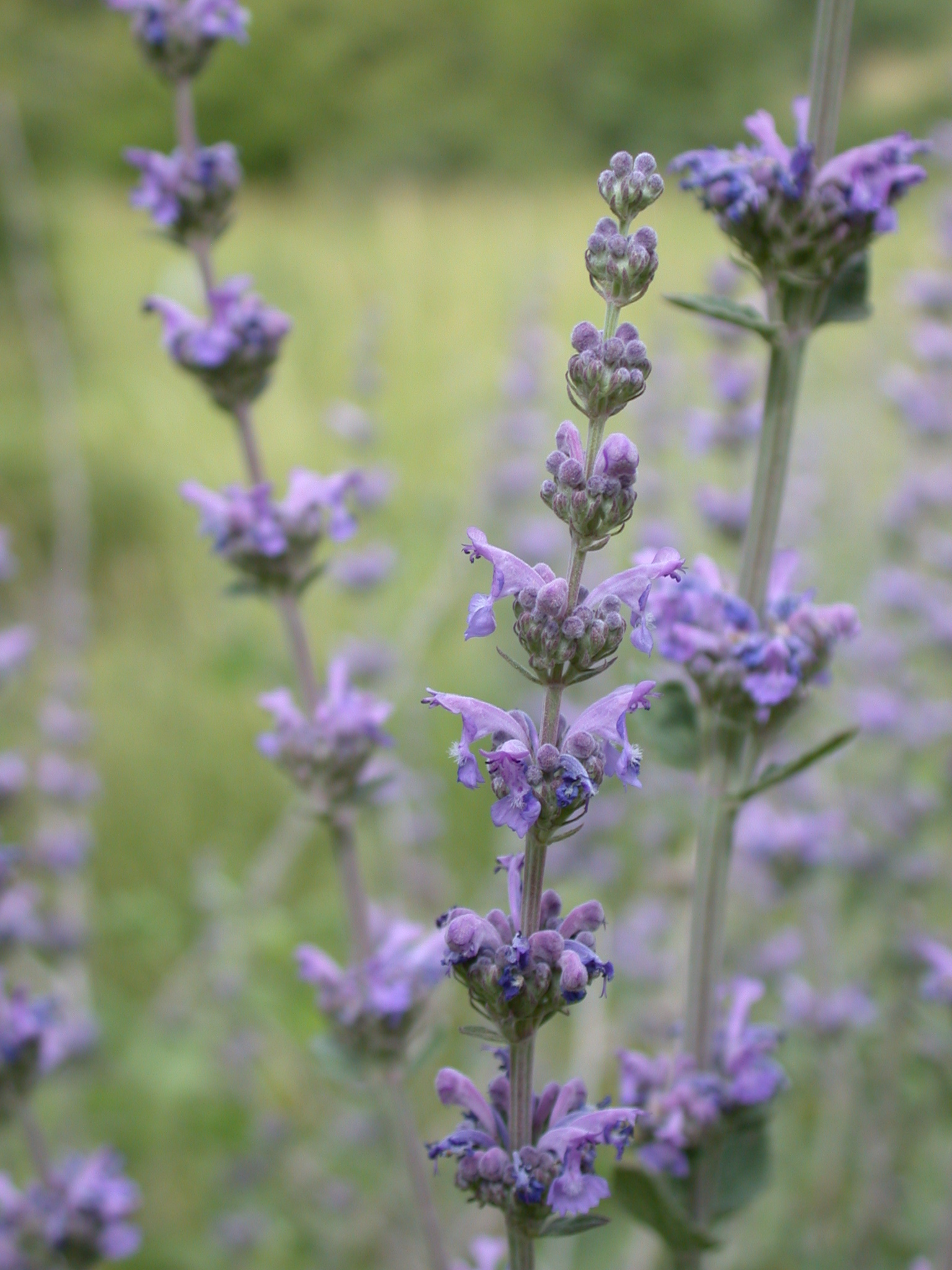

Scientific classification
- Kingdom: Plantae
- Clade: Tracheophytes
- Clade: Angiosperms
- Clade: Eudicots
- Clade: Asterids
- Order: Lamiales
- Family: Lamiaceae
- Genus: Nepeta
- Species: N. curviflora

Binomial name
- Nepeta curviflora Webb & Berthel.

Synonyms
- Glechoma curviflora (Boiss.) Kuntze

= Nepeta curviflora =

Species of flowering plant

Nepeta curviflora, commonly known as Syrian catnip, is a herbaceous flowering plant native to the Middle East. It was first described in 1844.

== Description ==
Nepeta curviflora is a perennial chamaephyte reaching heights between 60 and 80 cm. The fine, silvery aromatic leaves are small and form in clumps. The leaves are dentate. It will flower between April and June. The flowers are tubular and dark blue, appearing as verticillasters grouped on spikes. The fruit appears as nutlets.

== Distribution ==
Nepeta curviflora is native to the far eastern coastal regions of the Mediterranean, namely Israel, Lebanon and Syria. It inhabits Phrygana and Mediterranean woodlands, notably within the montane regions of Mount Hermon.

== Uses ==
Nepeta curviflora is occasionally seen in Horticulture, where it is sometimes mistaken with the similar appearing Nepeta italica. The two are differentiated by their flower colors, with N. italica presenting white while N. curviflora appears blue.

Al-Tamimi, the physician (d. 990), mentions a Jewish custom of making wreaths from the boughs of a plant identified as Nepeta curviflora during the Jewish holiday of Shavu'ot. Although the location is not explicitly specified, scholars suggest that this tradition was practiced in the Jerusalem area, possibly as a Karaite rather than a rabbinic custom.
