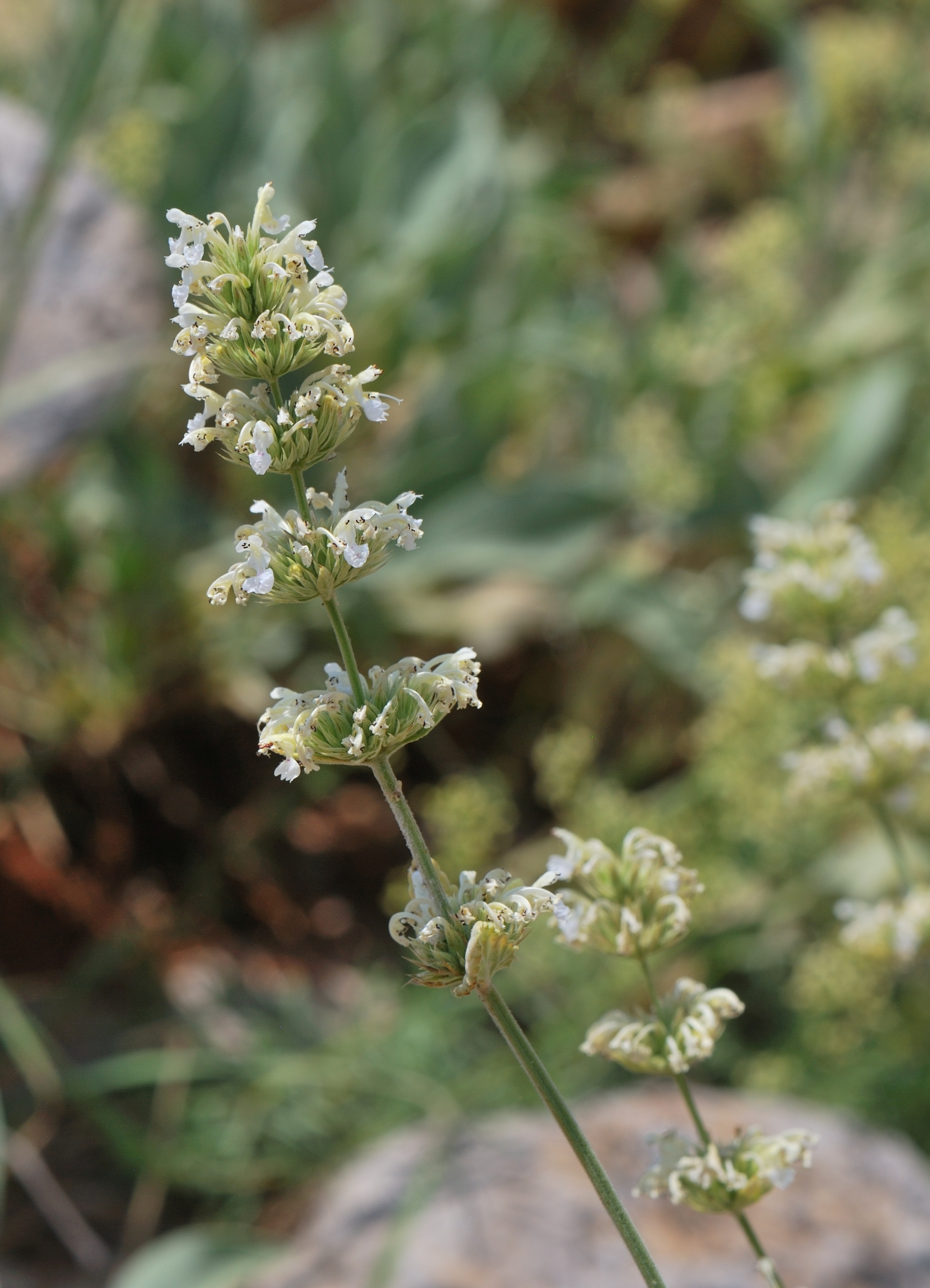

Scientific classification
- Kingdom: Plantae
- Clade: Tracheophytes
- Clade: Angiosperms
- Clade: Eudicots
- Clade: Asterids
- Order: Lamiales
- Family: Lamiaceae
- Genus: Nepeta
- Species: N. italica

Binomial name
- Nepeta italica L.

Synonyms
- Glechoma italica (L.) Kuntze

= Nepeta italica =

Species of plant

Nepeta italica is a species of flowering plant in the family Lamiaceae, native to east central Italy, and from the east Mediterranean to Iraq. It was first described by Carl Linnaeus in 1753.

== Subspecies ==
As of March 2024, Plants of the World Online accepted four subspecies:

- Nepeta italica subsp. cadmea (Boiss.) A.L.Budantsev
- Nepeta italica subsp. italica
- Nepeta italica subsp. rigidula A.L.Budantsev
- Nepeta italica subsp. troodi (Holmboe) A.L.Budantsev
