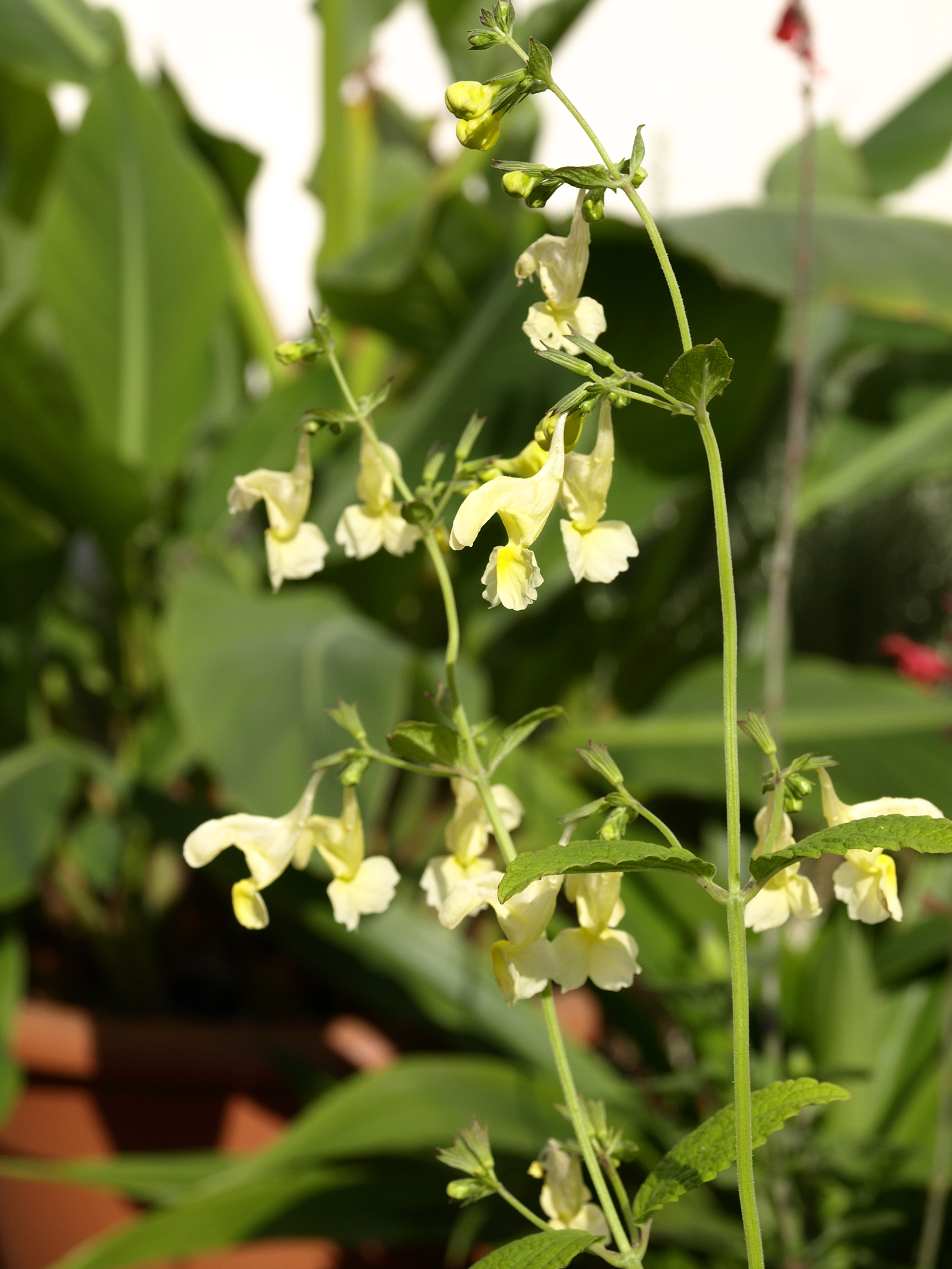

Scientific classification
- Kingdom: Plantae
- Clade: Tracheophytes
- Clade: Angiosperms
- Clade: Eudicots
- Clade: Asterids
- Order: Lamiales
- Family: Lamiaceae
- Genus: Nepeta
- Species: N. govaniana

Binomial name
- Nepeta govaniana (Wall. ex Benth.) Benth.

= Nepeta govaniana =

Species of flowering plant

Nepeta govaniana is a species of herbaceous flowering plant of the genus Nepeta. It was described in 1834. A common name for the species, Himalayan catnip, may also refer to Nepeta clarkei.
