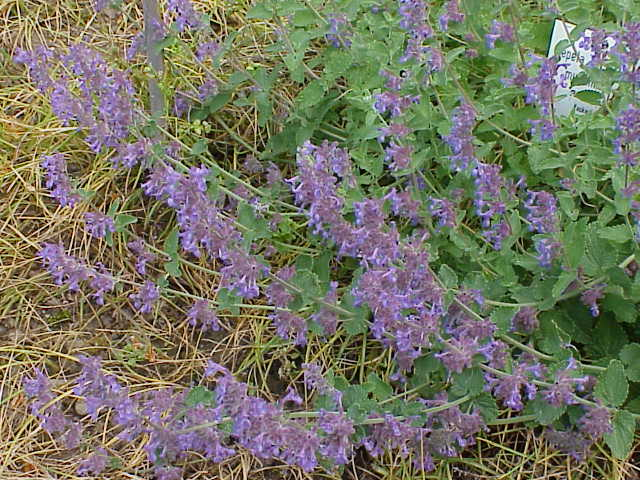

Scientific classification
- Kingdom: Plantae
- Clade: Tracheophytes
- Clade: Angiosperms
- Clade: Eudicots
- Clade: Asterids
- Order: Lamiales
- Family: Lamiaceae
- Genus: Nepeta
- Species: N. racemosa

Binomial name
- Nepeta racemosa Lam.

Subspecies
- N. racemosa subsp. crassifolia (Boiss. & Buhse) A.L.Budantzev; N. racemosa subsp. haussknechtii (Bornm.) A.L.Budantzev; N. racemosa subsp. racemosa

Synonyms
- Glechoma racemosa; Nepeta grandiflora var. racemosa

= Nepeta racemosa =

Plant species in the mint family

Nepeta racemosa, the dwarf catnip or raceme catnip, syn. N. mussiniii, is a species of flowering plant in the mint family Lamiaceae, native to the Caucasus, Turkey and northern Iran. Growing to 30 cm (12 in) tall by 45 cm (18 in) wide, it is a herbaceous perennial with aromatic leaves and violet or lilac-blue flowers in summer.

This plant is one of several Nepeta species to be cultivated as an ornamental. It is particularly suitable for the front of a flower border or as groundcover. It has gained the Royal Horticultural Society's Award of Garden Merit, as has the cultivar ‘Walker’s Low’

Nepetas are notable for their euphoric effect on some domestic cats. It is thought to be caused by the chemical nepetalactone which also has effects on some insects, repelling cockroaches and mosquitoes.

== Taxonomy ==
Nepeta racemosa is classified in the genus Nepeta in the Lamiaceae. It has three subspecies. It was scientifically described and named by Jean-Baptiste Lamarck in 1785.

=== Synonyms ===
Nepeta racemosa has 22 botanical synonyms of the species as a whole or one of its subspecies.

Table of Synonyms
Name	Year	Rank	Syn. of	Notes
Glechoma marifolia Kuntze	1891	species	subsp. racemosa	= het.
Glechoma mussinii (Spreng.) Kuntze	1891	species	subsp. racemosa	= het.
Glechoma racemosa (Lam.) Kuntze	1891	species	N. racemosa	≡ hom.
Nepeta crassifolia Boiss. & Buhse	1860	species	subsp. crassifolia	≡ hom.
Nepeta cyanotricha Tausch	1831	species	subsp. racemosa	= het.
Nepeta diffusa Fisch. ex Spreng.	1825	species	subsp. racemosa	= het.
Nepeta elbursensis Rech.f.	1952	species	subsp. racemosa	= het.
Nepeta grandiflora var. marifolia (Kuntze) Kusn.	1898	variety	subsp. racemosa	= het.
Nepeta grandiflora var. mussinii (Spreng.) Kusn.	1898	variety	subsp. racemosa	= het.
Nepeta grandiflora var. racemosa (Lam.) Kusn.	1898	variety	N. racemosa	≡ hom.
Nepeta hajastana Grossh.	1944	species	subsp. racemosa	= het.
Nepeta haussknechtii Bornm.	1899	species	subsp. haussknechtii	= het.
Nepeta longiflora Sims	1806	species	subsp. racemosa	= het.
Nepeta marifolia Boiss. & A.Huet	1859	species	subsp. racemosa	= het. nom. illeg.
Nepeta mussinii Spreng.	1805	species	subsp. racemosa	= het.
Nepeta noraschenica Grossh.	1949	species	subsp. haussknechtii	= het.
Nepeta obtusata E.Mey.	1831	species	subsp. racemosa	= het.
Nepeta reichenbachiana Fisch. & C.A.Mey.	1842	species	subsp. racemosa	= het.
Nepeta salviifolia Pers.	1806	species	subsp. racemosa	= het.
Nepeta tenuicaulis Boiss.	1879	species	subsp. racemosa	= het.
Nepeta transcaucasica Grossh.	1944	species	subsp. racemosa	= het.
Nepeta wildenowiana Benth.	1834	species	subsp. racemosa	= het.
Notes: ≡ homotypic synonym; = heterotypic synonym

=== Names ===
The Latin specific epithet racemosa means “having racemes of flowers”.
