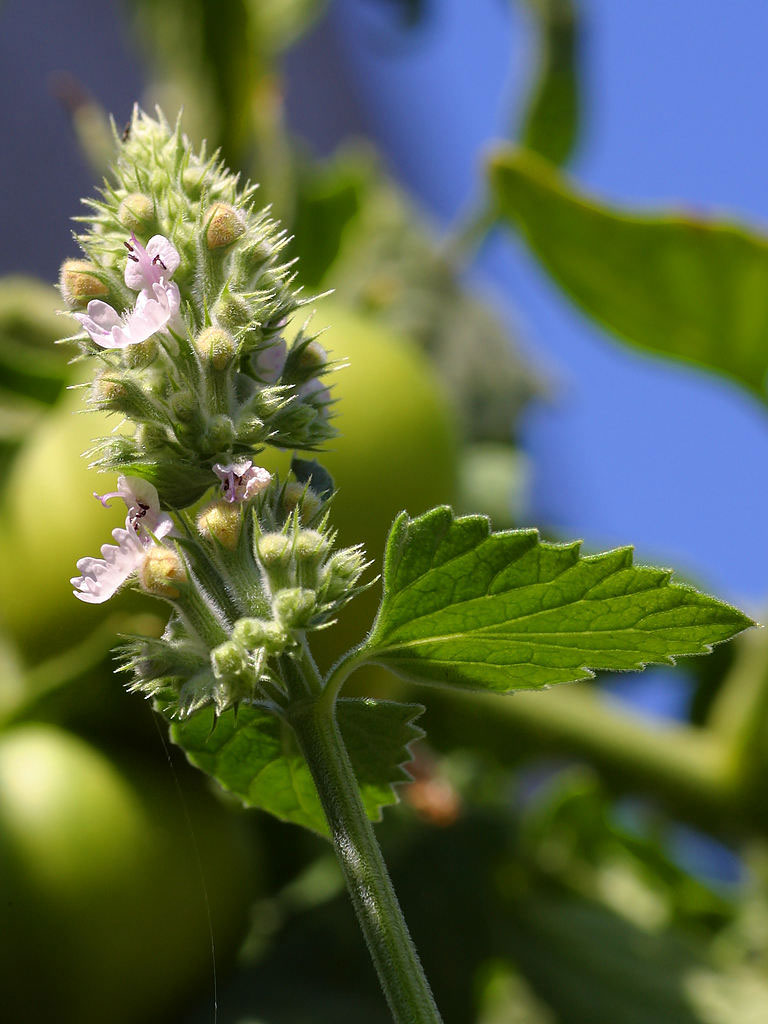
- Nepeta cataria – "true catnip"

Scientific classification
- Kingdom: Plantae
- Clade: Tracheophytes
- Clade: Angiosperms
- Clade: Eudicots
- Clade: Asterids
- Order: Lamiales
- Family: Lamiaceae
- Subfamily: Nepetoideae
- Tribe: Mentheae
- Genus: Nepeta; L. (1753)

Synonyms
- Afridia Duthie (1898); Cataria Adans. (1793); Hymenocrater Fisch. & C.A.Mey. (1836); Lophanthus Adans. (1763); Marmoritis Benth. (1833); Oxynepeta Bunge (1878); Phyllophyton Kudô (1929); Pitardia Batt. ex Pit. (1918); Pseudolophanthus Levin (1941); Saccilabium Rottb. (1778); Saussuria Moench (1794); Schizonepeta (Benth.) Briq. (1896); Vleckia Raf. (1808)

= Nepeta =

Genus of flowering plants

Nepeta is a genus of flowering plants in the family Lamiaceae. The genus name, from Latin nepeta (“catnip”), is reportedly in reference to Nepete, an ancient Etruscan city. There are 295 accepted species.

The genus is native to Europe, Asia, and Africa, and has also naturalized in North America.

Some members of this group are known as catnip or catmint because of their effect on house cats – the nepetalactone contained in some Nepeta species binds to the olfactory receptors of cats, typically resulting in temporary euphoria.

== Description ==
Most of the species are herbaceous perennial plants, but some are annuals. They have sturdy stems with opposite heart-shaped, green to gray-green leaves. Nepeta plants are usually aromatic in foliage and flowers.

The tubular flowers can be lavender, blue, white, pink, or lilac, and spotted with tiny lavender-purple dots. The flowers are located in verticillasters grouped on spikes; or the verticillasters are arranged in opposite cymes, racemes, or panicles – toward the tip of the stems.

The calyx is tubular or campanulate, they are slightly curved or straight, and the limbs are often 2-lipped with five teeth. The lower lip is larger, with 3-lobes, and the middle lobe is the largest. The flowers have 4 hairless stamens that are nearly parallel, and they ascend under the upper lip of the corolla. Two stamen are longer and stamens of pistillate flowers are rudimentary. The style protrudes outside of the mouth of the flowers.

The fruits are nutlets, which are oblong-ovoid, ellipsoid, ovoid, or obovoid in shape. The surfaces of the nutlets can be slightly ribbed, smooth or warty.

== Species ==
295 species are accepted.

- Nepeta adenoclada Bornm.
- Nepeta adenophyta Hedge
- Nepeta adenothrix (Rech.f.) Jamzad & Serpoosh.
- Nepeta agrestis Loisel.
- Nepeta alaghezi Pojark.
- Nepeta alatavica Lipsky
- Nepeta algeriensis Noë
- Nepeta allotria Rech.f.
- Nepeta altimurana (Rech.f.) Jamzad & Serpoosh.
- Nepeta amicorum Rech.f.
- Nepeta amoena Stapf
- Nepeta anamurensis Gemici & Leblebici
- Nepeta annua Pall.
- Nepeta apuleji Ucria
- Nepeta archibaldii Rech.f.
- Nepeta argolica Bory & Chaub.
- Nepeta assadii Jamzad
- Nepeta assurgens Hausskn. & Bornm.
- Nepeta astorensis Shinwari & Chaudhri
- Nepeta atlantica Ball
- Nepeta autraniana Bornm.
- Nepeta avromanica Jamzad & Serpoosh.
- Nepeta azurea R.Br. ex Benth.
- Nepeta badachschanica Kudrjasch.
- Nepeta bakhtiarica Rech.f.
- Nepeta balouchestanica Jamzad & Ingr.
- Nepeta barbara Maire
- Nepeta barfakensis Rech.f.
- Nepeta batalica Reshi
- Nepeta baytopii Hedge & Lamond
- Nepeta bazoftica Jamzad
- Nepeta bellevii Prain
- Nepeta betonicifolia C.A.Mey.
- Nepeta binaloudensis Jamzad
- Nepeta bituminosa (Fisch. & C.A.Mey.) Jamzad & Serpoosh.
- Nepeta bodeana Bunge
- Nepeta × boissieri Willk.
- Nepeta bokhonica Jamzad
- Nepeta bombaiensis Dalzell
- Nepeta bornmuelleri Hausskn. ex Bornm.
- Nepeta botschantzevii Czern.
- Nepeta brachyantha Rech.f. & Edelb.
- Nepeta bracteata Benth.
- Nepeta brevifolia C.A.Mey.
- Nepeta bucharica Lipsky
- Nepeta caerulea Aiton
- Nepeta caesarea Boiss.
- Nepeta campestris Benth.
- Nepeta camphorata Boiss. & Heldr.
- Nepeta × campylantha Rech.f.
- Nepeta cataria L.
- Nepeta cephalotes Boiss.
- Nepeta chionophila Boiss. & Hausskn.
- Nepeta ciliaris Benth.
- Nepeta cilicica Boiss. ex Benth.
- Nepeta clarkei Hook.f.
- Nepeta coerulescens Maxim.
- Nepeta complanata Dunn
- Nepeta concolor Boiss. & Heldr. ex Benth.
- Nepeta conferta Hedge & Lamond
- Nepeta congesta Fisch. & C.A.Mey.
- Nepeta connata Royle ex Benth.
- Nepeta consanguinea Pojark.
- Nepeta crinita Montbret & Aucher ex Benth.
- Nepeta crispa Willd.
- Nepeta curviflora Boiss.
- Nepeta cyanea Steven
- Nepeta cyrenaica Quézel & Zaffran
- Nepeta czegemensis Pojark.
- Nepeta czukavinae Kamelin & Lazkov
- Nepeta daenensis Boiss.
- Nepeta decolorans Hemsl.
- Nepeta deflersiana Schweinf. ex Hedge
- Nepeta densiflora Kar. & Kir.
- Nepeta dentata C.Y.Wu & S.J.Hsuan
- Nepeta denudata Benth.
- Nepeta depauperata Benth.
- Nepeta dirmencii Yild. & Dinç
- Nepeta discolor Royle ex Benth.
- Nepeta distans Royle
- Nepeta drassiana Reshi
- Nepeta dschuparensis Bornm.
- Nepeta duthiei Prain & Mukerjee
- Nepeta elegans Lipsky
- Nepeta elegantissima Jamzad & Serpoosh.
- Nepeta elliptica Royle ex Benth.
- Nepeta elymaitica Bornm.
- Nepeta erecta (Royle ex Benth.) Benth.
- Nepeta eremokosmos Rech.f.
- Nepeta eremophila Hausskn. & Bornm.
- Nepeta eriosphaera Rech.f. & Köie
- Nepeta eriostachya Benth.
- Nepeta ernesti-mayeri Diklic & V.Nikolic
- Nepeta everardii S.Moore
- Nepeta × faassenii Bergmans ex Stearn (N. nepetella × N. racemosa)
- Nepeta flavida Hub.-Mor.
- Nepeta floccosa Benth.
- Nepeta foliosa Moris
- Nepeta fordii Hemsl.
- Nepeta formosa Kudrjasch.
- Nepeta freitagii Rech.f.
- Nepeta glechomifolia (Dunn) Hedge
- Nepeta gloeocephala Rech.f.
- Nepeta glomerata Montbret & Aucher ex Benth.
- Nepeta glomerulosa Boiss.
- Nepeta glutinosa Benth.
- Nepeta gontscharovii Kudrjasch.
- Nepeta govaniana (Wall. ex Benth.) Benth.
- Nepeta graciliflora Benth.
- Nepeta granatensis Boiss.
- Nepeta grandiflora M.Bieb.
- Nepeta grata Benth.
- Nepeta griffithii Hedge
- Nepeta gumerica Reshi
- Nepeta hedgei Freitag
- Nepeta heinzii Idrees
- Nepeta heliotropifolia Lam.
- Nepeta hemsleyana Oliv. ex Prain
- Nepeta henanensis C.S.Zhu
- Nepeta hindostana (B.Heyne ex Roth) Haines
- Nepeta hispanica Boiss. & Reut.
- Nepeta hormozganica Jamzad
- Nepeta humilis Benth.
- Nepeta hymenodonta Boiss.
- Nepeta hystrix Greuter
- Nepeta iranshahrii Rech.f.
- Nepeta iraqensis Dirmenci
- Nepeta iraqo-iranica Haloob, Bordbar & Qader
- Nepeta isaurica Boiss. & Heldr. ex Benth.
- Nepeta ispahanica Boiss.
- Nepeta italica L.
- Nepeta jakupicensis Micevski
- Nepeta jomdaensis H.W.Li
- Nepeta juncea Benth.
- Nepeta knorringiana Pojark.
- Nepeta koeieana Rech.f.
- Nepeta kokamirica Regel
- Nepeta kokanica Regel
- Nepeta komarovii E.A.Busch
- Nepeta kotschyi Boiss.
- Nepeta kurdica Hausskn. & Bornm.
- Nepeta kurramensis Rech.f.
- Nepeta ladanolens Lipsky
- Nepeta laevigata (D.Don) Hand.-Mazz.
- Nepeta lagopsis Benth.
- Nepeta lamiifolia Willd.
- Nepeta lamiopsis Benth. ex Hook.f.
- Nepeta lancefolia Reshi
- Nepeta lasiocephala Benth.
- Nepeta latifolia DC.
- Nepeta laxiflora Benth.
- Nepeta leucolaena Benth. ex Hook.f.
- Nepeta linearis Royle ex Benth.
- Nepeta lipskyi Kudrjasch.
- Nepeta longibracteata Benth.
- Nepeta longiflora Vent.
- Nepeta longituba Pojark.
- Nepeta lophanthus (L.) Fisch. ex Loew
- Nepeta ludlow-hewittii Blakelock
- Nepeta macrosiphon Boiss.
- Nepeta mahanensis Jamzad & M.Simmonds
- Nepeta manchuriensis S.Moore
- Nepeta mariae Regel
- Nepeta margallaica A.Sultan, Jamzad & A.Khan
- Nepeta maussarifii Lipsky
- Nepeta melissifolia Lam.
- Nepeta membranifolia C.Y.Wu
- Nepeta menthoides Boiss. & Buhse
- Nepeta meyeri Benth.
- Nepeta michauxii Briq.
- Nepeta micrantha Bunge
- Nepeta minuticephala Jamzad
- Nepeta mirzayanii Rech.f. & Esfand.
- Nepeta monocephala Rech.f.
- Nepeta monticola Kudr.
- Nepeta multibracteata Desf.
- Nepeta multicaulis Mukerjee
- Nepeta multifida L.
- Nepeta narynensis Kamelin & Lazkov
- Nepeta natanzensis Jamzad
- Nepeta nawarica Rech.f.
- Nepeta neocalycina Idrees
- Nepeta nepalensis Spreng.
- Nepeta nepetella L.
- Nepeta nepetoides (Batt. ex Pit.) Harley
- Nepeta nervosa Royle ex Benth.
- Nepeta nivalis Benth.
- Nepeta nuda L.
- Nepeta obtusicrena Boiss. & Kotschy ex Hedge
- Nepeta odorifera Lipsky
- Nepeta olgae Regel
- Nepeta orphanidea Boiss.
- Nepeta ouroumitanensis Franch.
- Nepeta oxyodonta Boiss.
- Nepeta pabotii Mouterde
- Nepeta padamica Reshi
- Nepeta paktiana Rech.f.
- Nepeta pamirensis Franch.
- Nepeta parnassica Heldr. & Sart.
- Nepeta paucifolia Mukerjee
- Nepeta persica Boiss.
- Nepeta petraea Benth.
- Nepeta phyllochlamys P.H.Davis
- Nepeta pilinux P.H.Davis
- Nepeta pinetorum Aitch. & Hemsl.
- Nepeta platystegia (Rech.f.) Jamzad & Serpoosh. ex Idrees
- Nepeta podlechii Rech.f.
- Nepeta podostachys Benth.
- Nepeta pogonosperma Jamzad & Assadi
- Nepeta polyodonta Rech.f.
- Nepeta praetervisa Rech.f.
- Nepeta prattii H.Lév.
- Nepeta prostrata Benth.
- Nepeta pseudokokanica Pojark.
- Nepeta pubescens Benth.
- Nepeta pungens (Bunge) Benth.
- Nepeta racemosa Lam.
- Nepeta raphanorhiza Benth.
- Nepeta rechingeri Hedge
- Nepeta rivularis Bornm.
- Nepeta roopiana Bordz.
- Nepeta rotundifolia (Benth.) Benth.
- Nepeta rtanjensis Diklic & Milojevic
- Nepeta rubella A.L.Budantzev
- Nepeta rugosa Benth.
- Nepeta saccharata Bunge
- Nepeta sahandica Noroozi & Ajani
- Nepeta santoana Popov
- Nepeta saturejoides Boiss.
- Nepeta schiraziana Boiss.
- Nepeta schmidii Rech.f.
- Nepeta schrenkii (Levin) Sennikov
- Nepeta schtschurowskiana Regel
- Nepeta schugnanica Lipsky
- Nepeta scordotis L.
- Nepeta septemcrenata Ehrenb. ex Benth.
- Nepeta sessilifolia Bunge
- Nepeta sessilis C.Y.Wu & S.J.Hsuan
- Nepeta shahmirzadensis Assadi & Jamzad
- Nepeta sheilae Hedge & R.A.King
- Nepeta sibirica L.
- Nepeta sorgerae Hedge & Lamond
- Nepeta sosnovskyi Askerova
- Nepeta souliei H.Lév.
- Nepeta spathulifera Benth.
- Nepeta sphaciotica P.H.Davis
- Nepeta spruneri Boiss.
- Nepeta stachyoides Coss. ex Batt.
- Nepeta staintonii Hedge
- Nepeta stenantha Kotschy & Boiss.
- Nepeta stewartiana Diels
- Nepeta straussii Hausskn. & Bornm.
- Nepeta stricta (Banks & Sol.) Hedge & Lamond
- Nepeta suavis Stapf
- Nepeta subcaespitosa Jehan
- Nepeta subhastata Regel
- Nepeta subincisa Benth.
- Nepeta subintegra Maxim.
- Nepeta subnivalis (Lipsky) Sennikov
- Nepeta subsessilis Maxim.
- Nepeta sudanica F.W.Andrews
- Nepeta sulfuriflora P.H.Davis
- Nepeta sulphurea C. Koch
- Nepeta sungpanensis C.Y.Wu
- Nepeta supina Steven
- Nepeta taxkorganica Y.F.Chang
- Nepeta tenuiflora Diels
- Nepeta tenuifolia Benth.
- Nepeta teucriifolia Willd.
- Nepeta teydea Webb & Berthel.
- Nepeta tibestica Maire
- Nepeta × tmolea Boiss.
- Nepeta trachonitica Post
- Nepeta transiliensis Pojark.
- Nepeta trautvetteri Boiss. & Buhse
- Nepeta trichocalyx Greuter & Burdet
- Nepeta tschimganica (Lipsky) Jamzad & Serpoosh.
- Nepeta tuberosa L.
- Nepeta turcica (Dirmenci, Yıldız & Hedge) Jamzad & Serpoosh.
- Nepeta tytthantha Pojark.
- Nepeta uberrima Rech.f.
- Nepeta ucranica L.
- Nepeta veitchii Duthie
- Nepeta velutina Pojark.
- Nepeta viscida Boiss.
- Nepeta vivianii (Coss.) Bég. & Vacc.
- Nepeta wettsteinii Heinr.Braun
- Nepeta wilsonii Duthie
- Nepeta woodiana Hedge
- Nepeta wuana H.J.Dong, C.L.Xiang & Jamzad
- Nepeta yanthina Franch.
- Nepeta yazdiana (Rech.f.) Jamzad & Serpoosh.
- Nepeta yesoensis (Franch. & Sav.) B.D.Jacks.
- Nepeta zandaensis H.W.Li
- Nepeta zangezura Grossh.

== Gallery ==
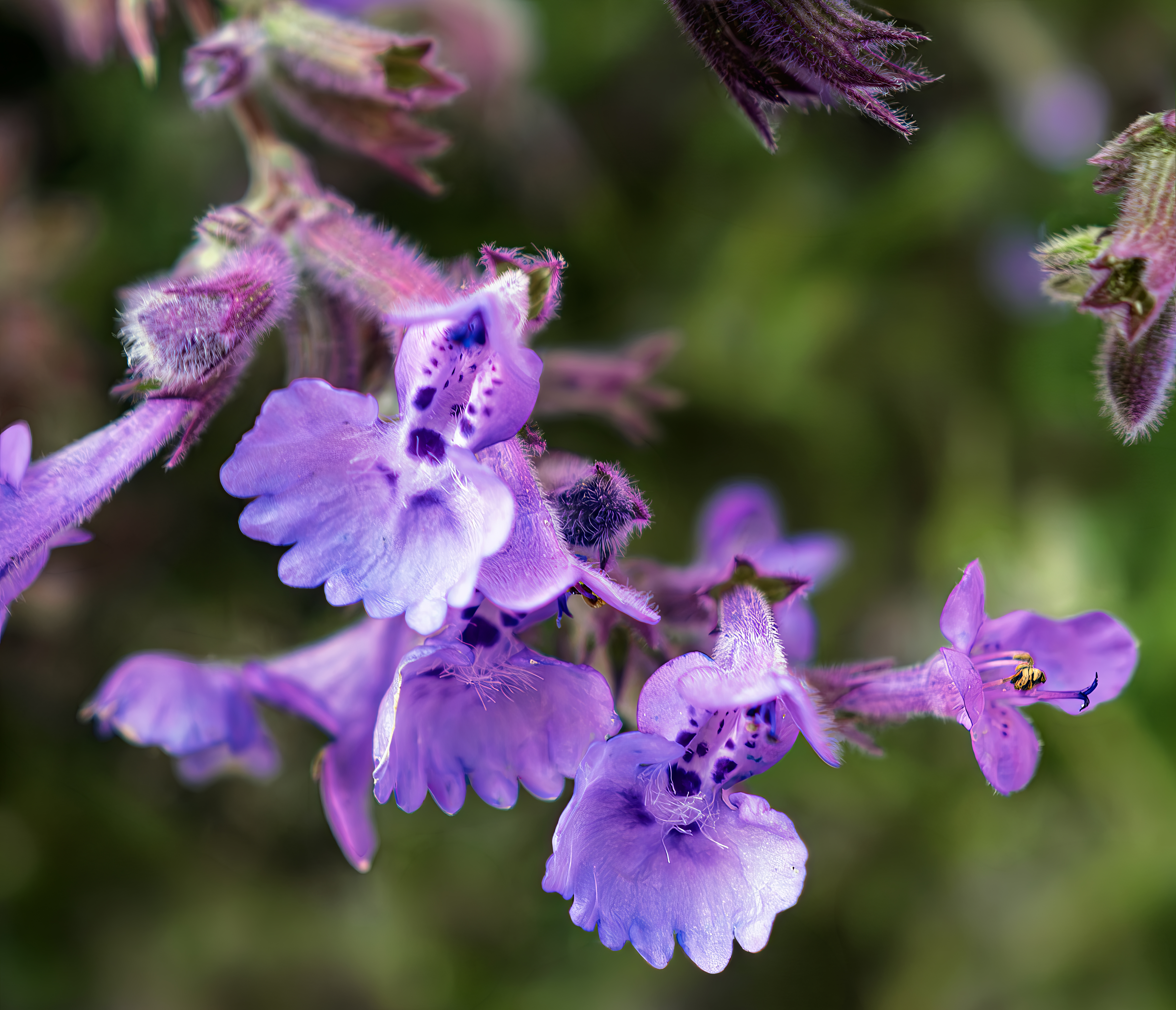
Nepeta × faassenii - flowers

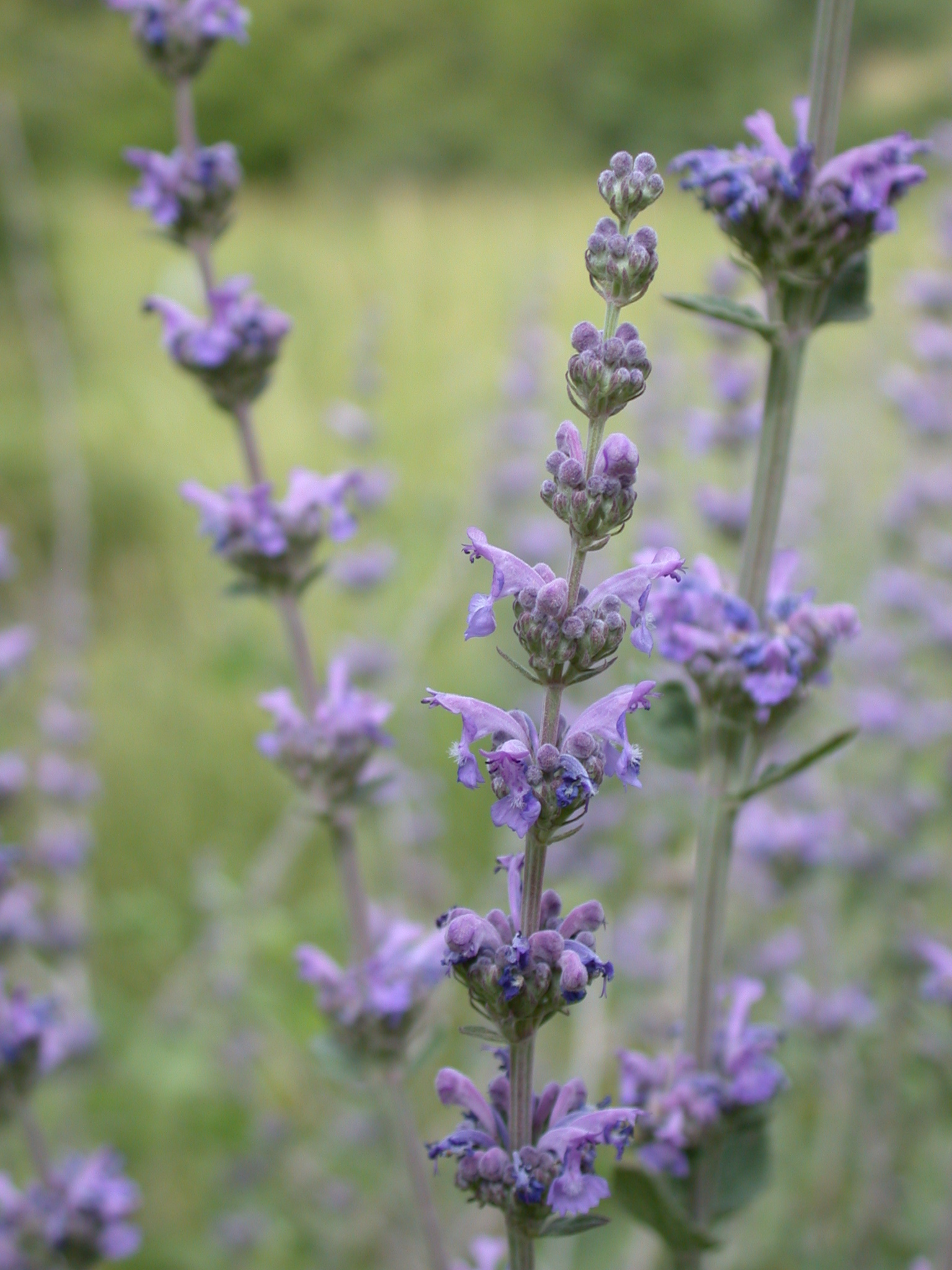
Flower spikes of Nepeta curviflora

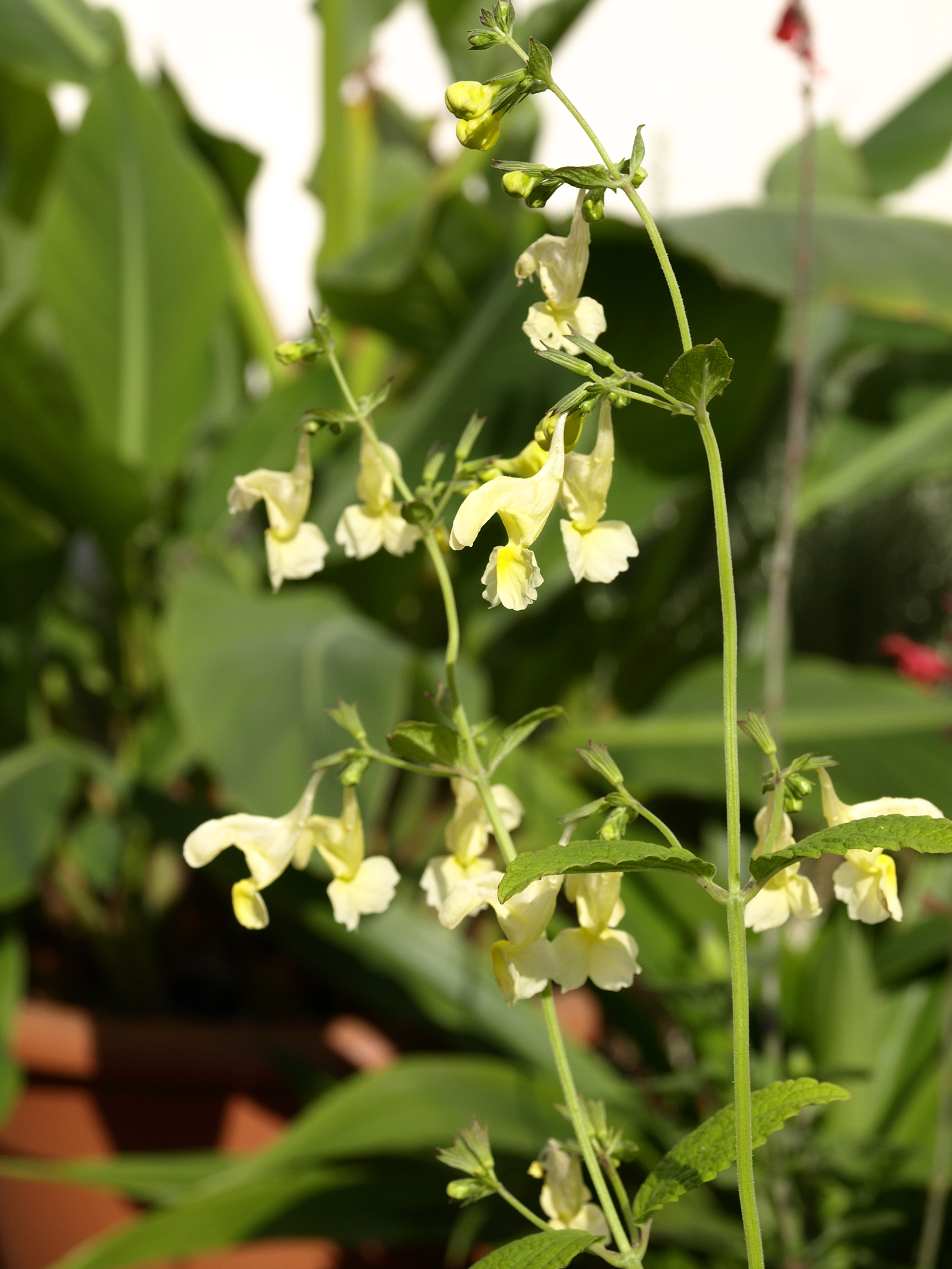
Nepeta govaniana

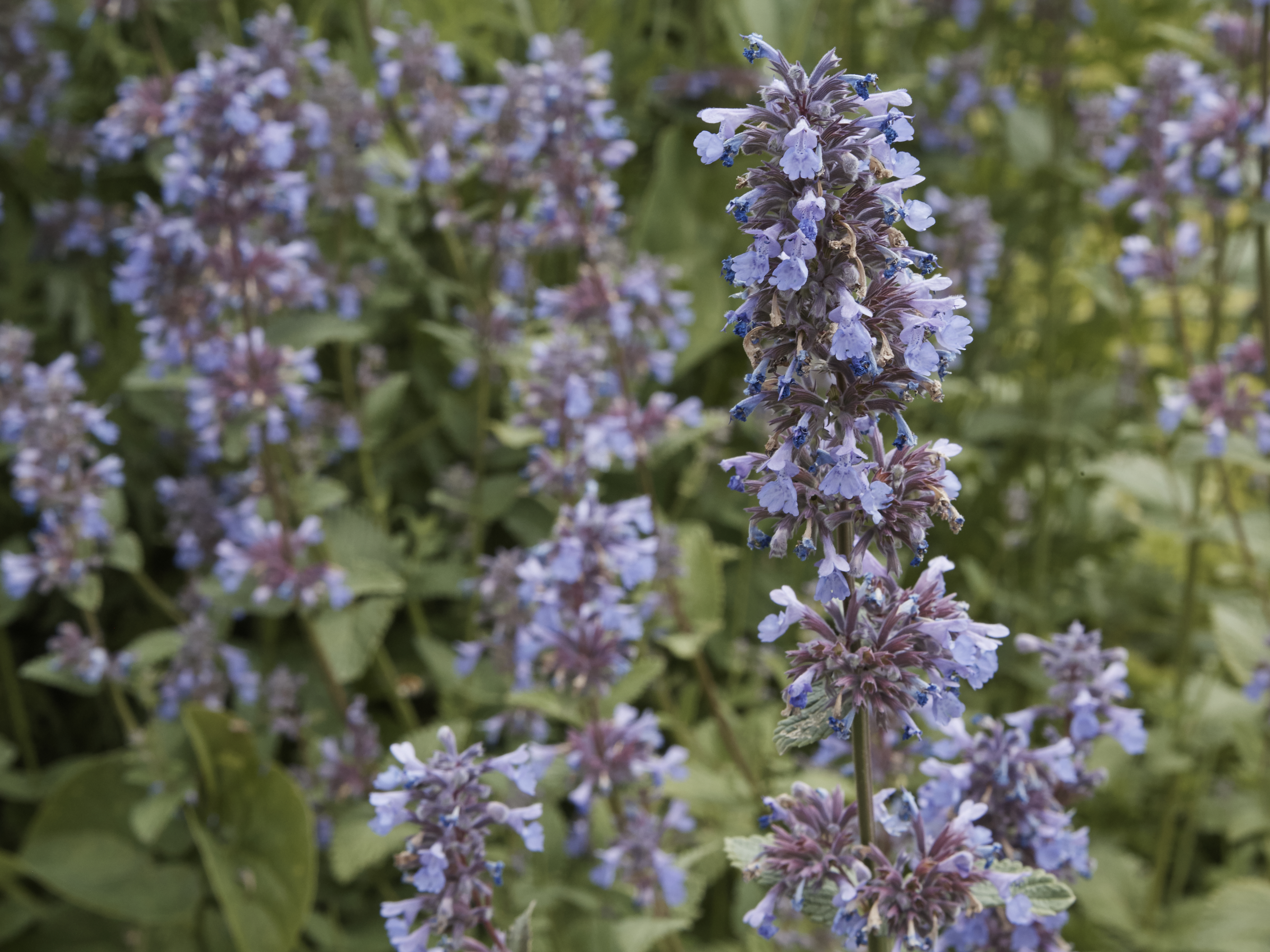
Nepeta grandiflora

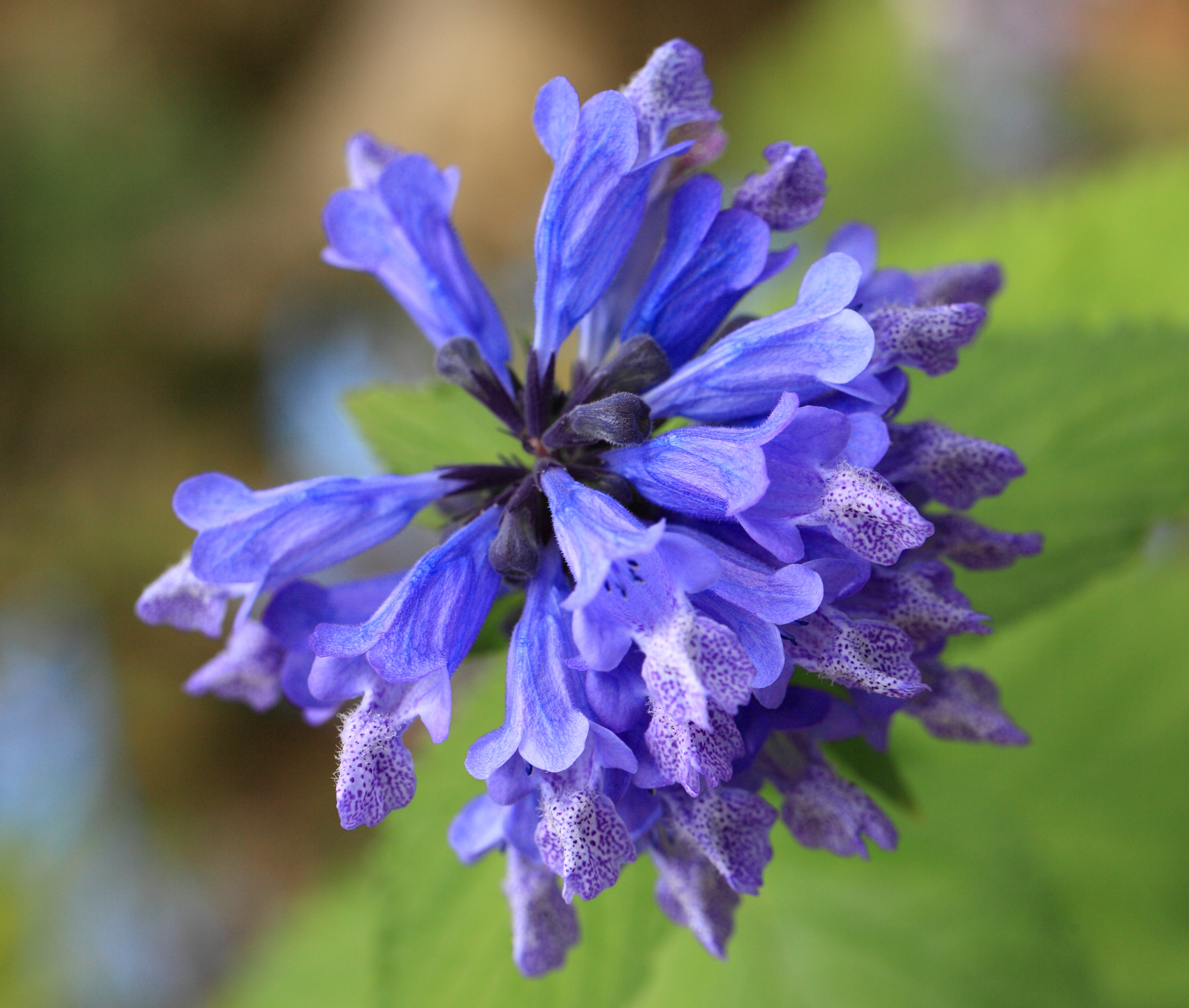
Nepeta subsessilis

== Uses ==
=== Cultivation ===
Some Nepeta species are cultivated as ornamental plants. They can be drought tolerant – water conserving, often deer repellent, with long bloom periods from late spring to autumn. Some species also have repellent properties to insect pests, including aphids and squash bugs, when planted in a garden.

Nepeta species are used as food plants by the larvae of some Lepidoptera (butterfly and moth) species including Coleophora albitarsella, and as nectar sources for pollinators, such as honey bees and hummingbirds.

Selected ornamental species

- Nepeta cataria (catnip, catswort) – the "true catnip", cultivated as an ornamental plant, has become an invasive species in some habitats.
- Nepeta grandiflora (giant catmint, Caucasus catmint) – lusher than true catnip and has dark green leaves and dark blue flowers.
- Nepeta × faassenii (garden catmint) – a hybrid of garden source with gray-green foliage and lavender flowers. It is drought-tolerant and deer-resistant. The cultivar 'Walker's Low' was named Perennial of the Year for 2007 by the Perennial Plant Association.
- Nepeta racemosa (raceme catnip) – commonly used in landscaping. It is hardy, rated for USDA hardiness zone 5b.
