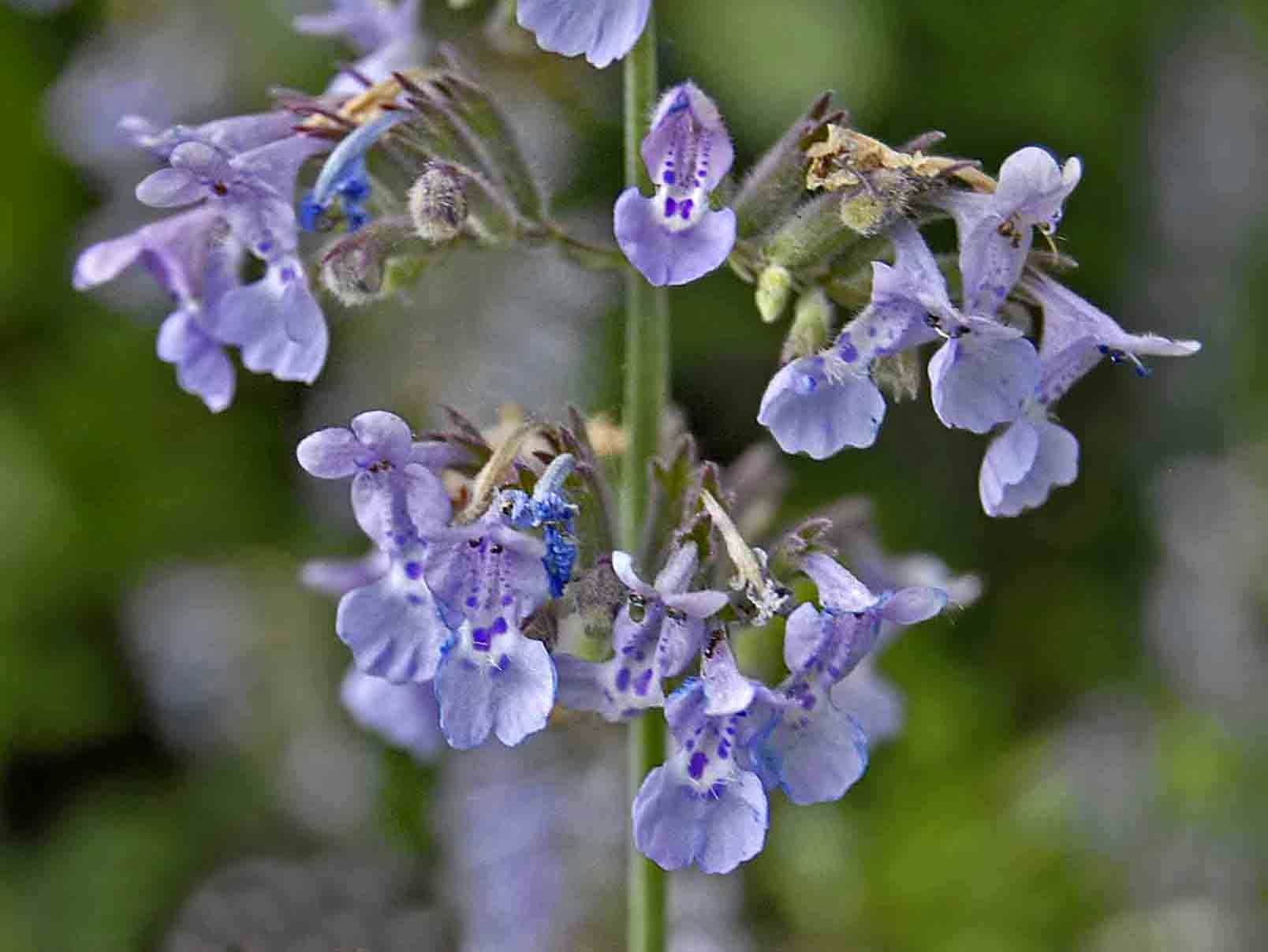
- Nepeta nepetella at Orto Botanico dell'Università di Genova

Scientific classification
- Kingdom: Plantae
- Clade: Tracheophytes
- Clade: Angiosperms
- Clade: Eudicots
- Clade: Asterids
- Order: Lamiales
- Family: Lamiaceae
- Genus: Nepeta
- Species: N. nepetella

Binomial name
- Nepeta nepetella L.

Synonyms
- Cataria nepetella (L.) Moench; Glechoma nepetella (L.) Kuntze; Nepeta aragonensis Lam.; Nepeta amethystina Desf. ex Poir.; Nepeta civitiana Pau; Nepeta ceballosii Vicioso & Pau; Nepeta almeriensis Sennen; Nepeta hieronymi Sennen; Nepeta murcica Guirão ex Willk.; Nepeta imbricata Lag. ex Spreng.; Nepeta mallophora Webb & Heldr.; Nepeta angustifolia Mill.; Nepeta lanceolata Lam.; Nepeta graveolens Vill.; Nepeta humilis Salisb.; Nepeta arragonensis Benth.; Nepeta delphinensis Mutel; Nepeta longicaulis Dufour; Cataria tenuifolia Bubani; Nepeta catalaunica Sennen

= Nepeta nepetella =

Species of flowering plant

Nepeta nepetella, common name lesser cat-mint, is a low-growing species of catnip belonging to the family Lamiaceae. It is native to France, Spain, Italy, Algeria, and Morocco.

Subspecies

1. Nepeta nepetella subsp. aragonensis (Lam.) Nyman - Spain, Algeria, Morocco
2. Nepeta nepetella subsp. laciniata (Willk.) Aedo - Sierra Nevada of southern Spain
3. Nepeta nepetella subsp. murcica (Guirão ex Willk.) Aedo - Morocco, southern Spain
4. Nepeta nepetella subsp. nepetella - Pyrenees, western Alps, + Apennines of Spain, France, Italy

== Description ==
Nepeta nepetella can reach a height of 40–80 centimetres (16–31 in). This perennial very variable plant has usually green crenate leaves and produces in summer spikes with bluish-violet small flowers about 1–1.2 centimetres (0.39–0.47 in) long.

== Uses ==
Nepetella, as it is commonly called (other names include nepeta, nepitella) is used in Tuscan cooking, often for mushrooms and artichokes. Due to the difficulty in obtaining nepetella, many recipes have been rewritten to contain oregano and mint.
