= List of Canadian plants by family E =

Main page: List of Canadian plants by family

The following families of vascular plants are listed as occurring in Canada:

For mosses of Canada, see:

== Elaeagnaceae ==
- Elaeagnus commutata — American silverberry
- Shepherdia argentea — silver buffaloberry
- Shepherdia canadensis — Canada buffaloberry

== Elatinaceae ==
- Elatine americana — American waterwort
- Elatine minima — small waterwort
- Elatine rubella — southwestern waterwort
- Elatine triandra — longstem waterwort

== Empetraceae ==
- Corema conradii — broom crowberry
- Empetrum eamesii — rock crowberry
- Empetrum nigrum — black crowberry

== Encalyptaceae ==
- Bryobrittonia longipes
- Encalypta affinis
- Encalypta alpina
- Encalypta brevicolla
- Encalypta brevipes
- Encalypta ciliata
- Encalypta intermedia
- Encalypta longicolla
- Encalypta mutica
- Encalypta procera — extinguisher moss
- Encalypta rhaptocarpa — extinguisher moss
- Encalypta spathulata
- Encalypta vulgaris

== Entodontaceae ==
- Entodon brevisetus
- Entodon cladorrhizans
- Entodon concinnus — lime entodon
- Entodon schleicheri
- Entodon seductrix
- Pleurozium schreberi — feathermoss

== Ephemeraceae ==
- Ephemerum cohaerens — emerald dewdrops
- Ephemerum crassinervium — emerald dewdrops
- Ephemerum serratum
- Ephemerum spinulosum — emerald dewdrops
- Micromitrium austinii

== Equisetaceae ==
- Equisetum arvense — field horsetail
- Equisetum braunii — giant horsetail
- Equisetum fluviatile — water horsetail
- Equisetum laevigatum — smooth scouring-rush
- Equisetum palustre — marsh horsetail
- Equisetum praealtum — rough horsetail
- Equisetum pratense — meadow horsetail
- Equisetum scirpoides — dwarf scouring-rush
- Equisetum sylvaticum — woodland horsetail
- Equisetum variegatum — variegated horsetail
- Equisetum x ferrissii
- Equisetum x litorale
- Equisetum x mackaii
- Equisetum x nelsonii

== Ericaceae ==
- Andromeda polifolia — bog rosemary
- Arbutus menziesii — Pacific madrone
- Arctostaphylos alpina — alpine manzanita
- Arctostaphylos columbiana — bristly manzanita
- Arctostaphylos rubra — red manzanita
- Arctostaphylos uva-ursi — bearberry
- Arctostaphylos x media
- Arctostaphylos x victorinii — Victorin's bearberry
- Cassiope lycopodioides — clubmoss bell-heather
- Cassiope mertensiana — western bell-heather
- Cassiope tetragona — arctic bell-heather
- Chamaedaphne calyculata — leatherleaf
- Elliottia pyroliflorus — copper-flower
- Epigaea repens — trailing arbutus
- Gaultheria hispidula — creeping snowberry
- Gaultheria humifusa — alpine spicy wintergreen
- Gaultheria ovatifolia — slender wintergreen
- Gaultheria procumbens — teaberry
- Gaultheria shallon — salal
- Gaylussacia baccata — black huckleberry
- Gaylussacia dumosa — dwarf huckleberry
- Harrimanella hypnoides — moss bell-heather
- Harrimanella stelleriana — starry bell-heather
- Kalmia angustifolia — sheep laurel
- Kalmia microphylla — alpine bog laurel
- Kalmia polifolia — pale laurel
- Ledum glandulosum — glandular Labrador-tea
- Ledum groenlandicum — common Labrador-tea
- Ledum palustre — marsh Labrador-tea
- Ledum x columbianum — Columbian Labrador-tea
- Loiseleuria procumbens — alpine-azalea
- Menziesia ferruginea — mock-azalea
- Phyllodoce caerulea — blue mountain-heath
- Phyllodoce empetriformis — pink mountain-heath
- Phyllodoce glanduliflora — yellow mountain-heath
- Phyllodoce x intermedia — hybrid mountain-heath
- Rhododendron albiflorum — white-flowered rhododendron
- Rhododendron canadense — rhodora
- Rhododendron lapponicum — Lapland azalea
- Rhododendron macrophyllum — Pacific rhododendron
- Vaccinium angustifolium — late lowbush blueberry
- Vaccinium boreale — northern blueberry
- Vaccinium caespitosum — dwarf huckleberry
- Vaccinium corymbosum — highbush blueberry
- Vaccinium deliciosum — Rainier blueberry
- Vaccinium fuscatum — black highbush blueberry
- Vaccinium macrocarpon — large cranberry
- Vaccinium membranaceum — square-twigged huckleberry
- Vaccinium myrtilloides — velvetleaf blueberry
- Vaccinium myrtillus — whortleberry
- Vaccinium ovalifolium — oval-leaf huckleberry
- Vaccinium ovatum — evergreen blueberry
- Vaccinium oxycoccos — small cranberry
- Vaccinium pallidum — early lowbush blueberry
- Vaccinium parvifolium — red blueberry
- Vaccinium scoparium — grouseberry
- Vaccinium stamineum — squaw huckleberry
- Vaccinium uliginosum — alpine blueberry
- Vaccinium vitis-idaea — mountain cranberry
- Vaccinium x nubigenum

== Eriocaulaceae ==
- Eriocaulon aquaticum — seven-angle pipewort
- Eriocaulon parkeri — Parker's pipewort

== Euphorbiaceae ==
- Acalypha rhomboidea — common copperleaf
- Chamaesyce geyeri — Geyer's broomspurge
- Chamaesyce glyptosperma — corrugate-seed broomspurge
- Chamaesyce nutans — eyebane broomspurge
- Chamaesyce polygonifolia — seaside spurge
- Chamaesyce serpens — matted broomspurge
- Chamaesyce serpyllifolia — thymeleaf broomspurge
- Chamaesyce vermiculata — worm-seeded spurge
- Euphorbia commutata — wood spurge
- Euphorbia corollata — flowering spurge
- Euphorbia spathulata — reticulate-seeded spurge
