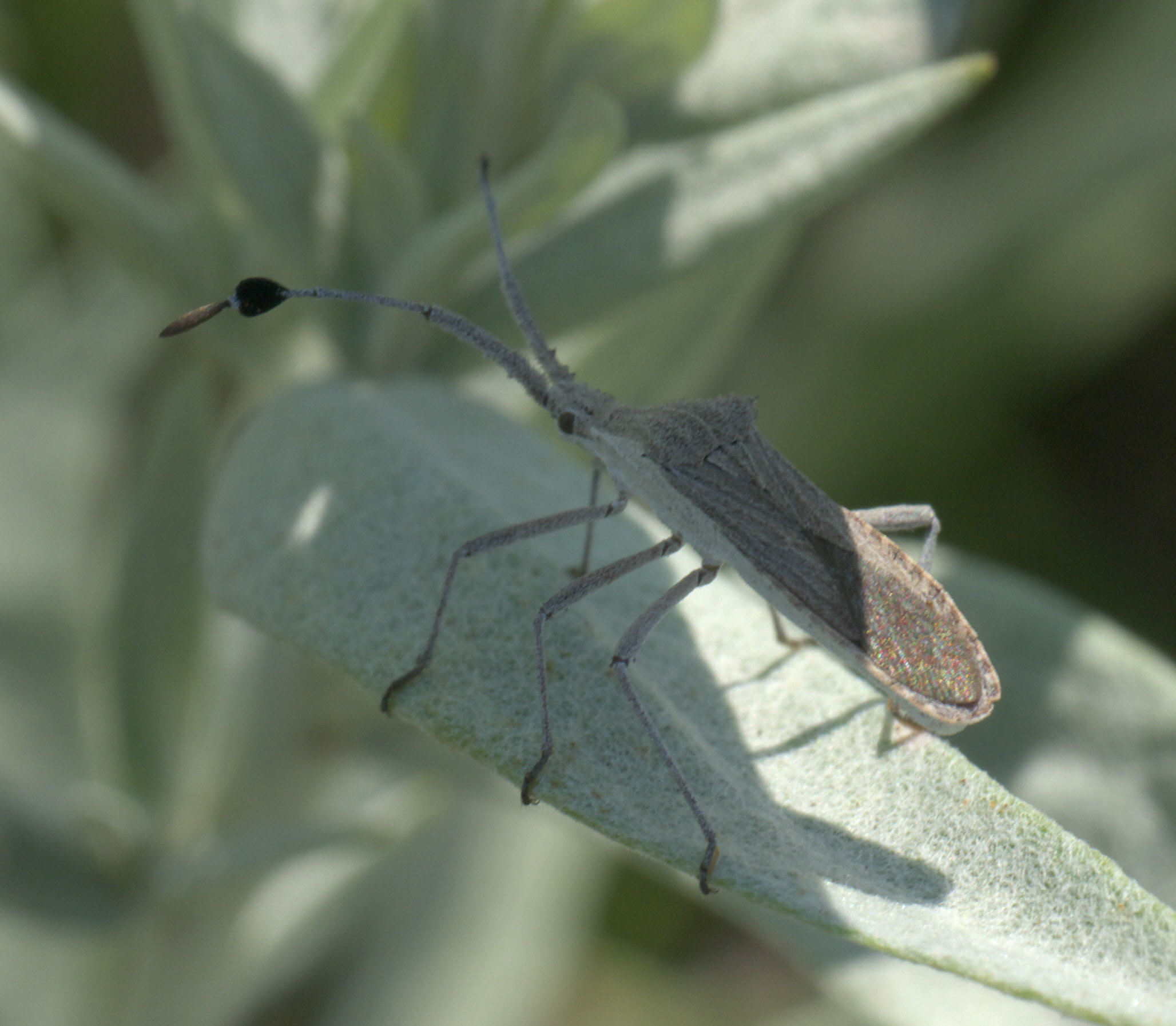

Scientific classification
- Domain: Eukaryota
- Kingdom: Animalia
- Phylum: Arthropoda
- Class: Insecta
- Order: Hemiptera
- Suborder: Heteroptera
- Family: Coreidae
- Genus: Chariesterus
- Species: C. antennator

Binomial name
- Chariesterus antennator (Fabricius, 1803)

= Chariesterus antennator =

Species of true bug

Chariesterus antennator, the euphorbia bug, is a species of leaf-footed bug in the family Coreidae. It is found in North America and China. Adults feed on Euphorbia corollata.
