= Chariesterus balli =

Scientific classification
- Domain: Eukaryota
- Kingdom: Animalia
- Phylum: Arthropoda
- Class: Insecta
- Order: Hemiptera
- Suborder: Heteroptera
- Family: Coreidae
- Tribe: Chariesterini
- Genus: Chariesterus
- Species: C. balli

Binomial name
- Chariesterus balli Fracker, 1919

Species of true bug

Chariesterus balli is a species of leaf-footed bug in the family Coreidae. It is found in Central America and North America.
