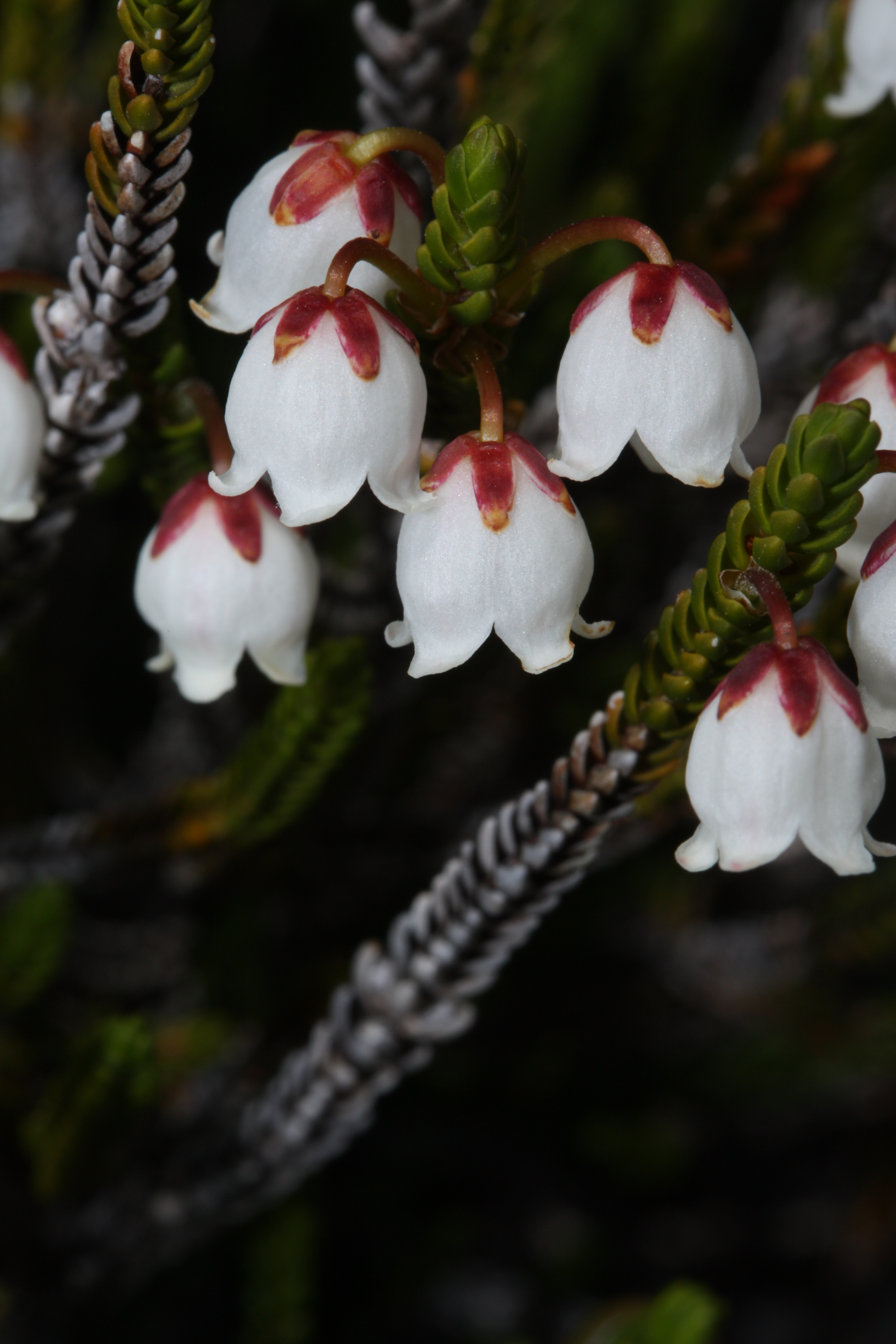
- Cassiope mertensiana

Scientific classification
- Kingdom: Plantae
- Clade: Embryophytes
- Clade: Tracheophytes
- Clade: Angiosperms
- Clade: Eudicots
- Clade: Asterids
- Order: Ericales
- Family: Ericaceae
- Subfamily: Cassiopoideae; Kron & Judd
- Genus: Cassiope; D.Don

Synonyms
- Harrimanella Coville

= Cassiope =

Genus of flowering plants in the heather family

Cassiope is a genus of 18 small shrubby species in the family Ericaceae. It is the sole genus in the subfamily Cassiopoideae. They are native to the Arctic and north temperate montane regions. The genus is named after Cassiopeia of Greek mythology.

== Description ==
Cassiope has scale-like leaves lying against the stems, and produce solitary bell-shaped flowers in late spring. Though hardy, flowers can be damaged by late frosts.

== Taxonomy ==
=== Species ===
Plants of the World Online (POWO) accepts 18 species and 1 hybrid:

- Cassiope abbreviata Hand.-Mazz.
- Cassiope x anadyrensis Jurtzev
- Cassiope argyrotricha T.Z.Hsu
- Cassiope ericoides (Pall.) D.Don
- Cassiope fastigiata (Wall.) D.Don
- Cassiope fujianensis L.K.Ling & G.Hoo
- Cassiope hypnoides (L.) D.Don
- Cassiope lycopodioides (Pall.) D.Don
- Cassiope membranifolia R.C.Fang
- Cassiope mertensiana (Bong.) G.Don
- Cassiope myosuroides W.W.Sm.
- Cassiope nana T.Z.Hsu
- Cassiope palpebrata W.W.Sm.
- Cassiope pectinata Stapf
- Cassiope redowskii (Cham. & Schltdl.) G.Don
- Cassiope selaginoides Hook.f. & Thomson
- Cassiope stelleriana (Pall.) DC.
- Cassiope tetragona (L.) D.Don
- Cassiope wardii Marquand

== Uses ==
Cassiope is cultivated in gardens, suitable sites being rock gardens, peat banks or glades in woodland areas.
