= Yakedake =

Yakedake may refer to:

- Mount Yake, an active volcano in the Hida Mountains, Japan
- 11140 Yakedake, an asteroid named after the volcano
