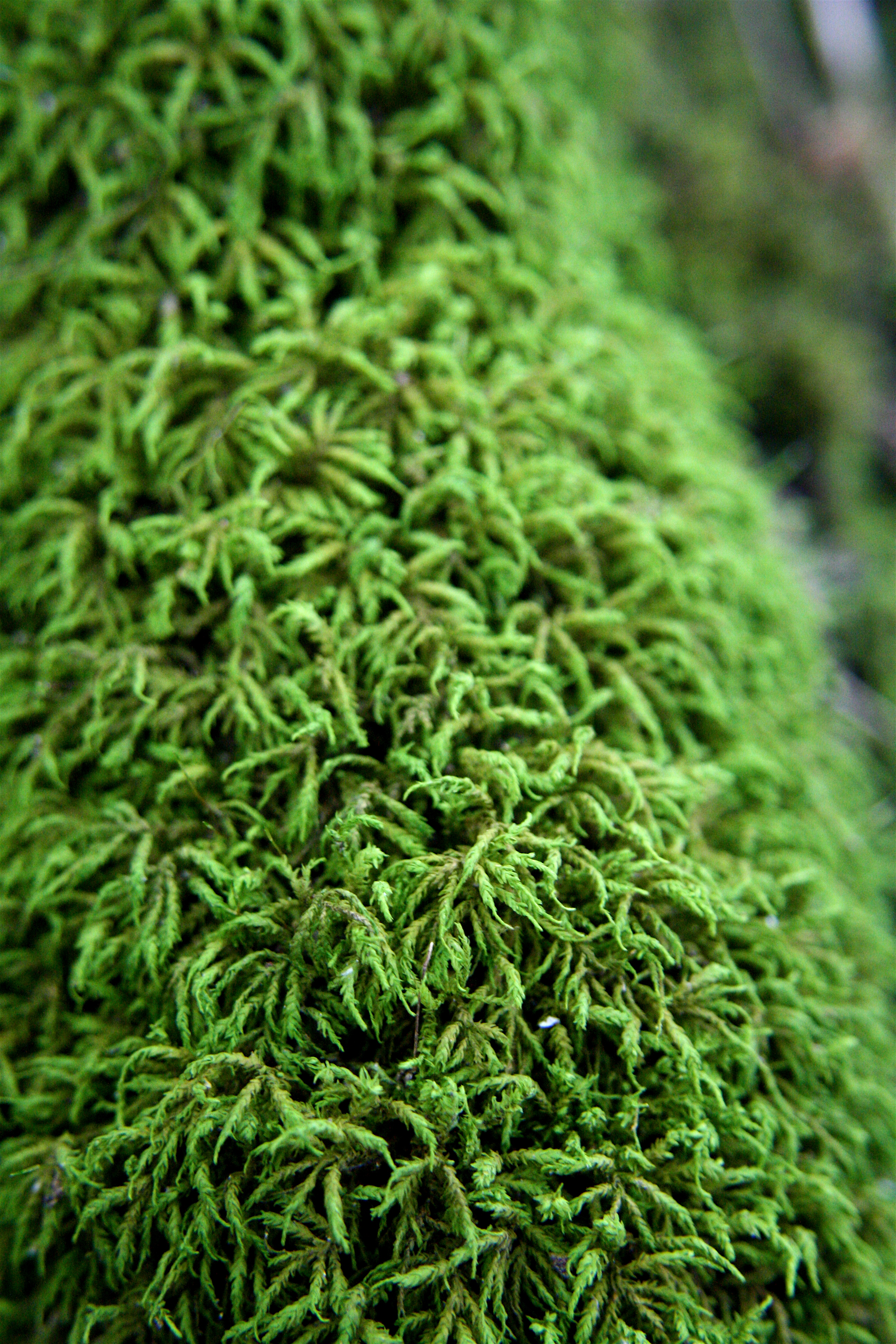
- Entodon seductrix

Scientific classification
- Kingdom: Plantae
- Division: Bryophyta
- Class: Bryopsida
- Subclass: Bryidae
- Order: Hypnales
- Family: Entodontaceae
- Genus: Entodon; Müll.Hal.

= Entodon =

Genus of mosses

Entodon is a genus of mosses belonging to the family Entodontaceae.

The genus has cosmopolitan distribution.

Species:

- Entodon abbreviatus Jaeger, 1878
- Entodon abyssinicus (Müll.Hal.) A.Jaeger
- Entodon concinnus Paris, 1904
- Entodon seductrix (Hedw.) Müll. Hal.
