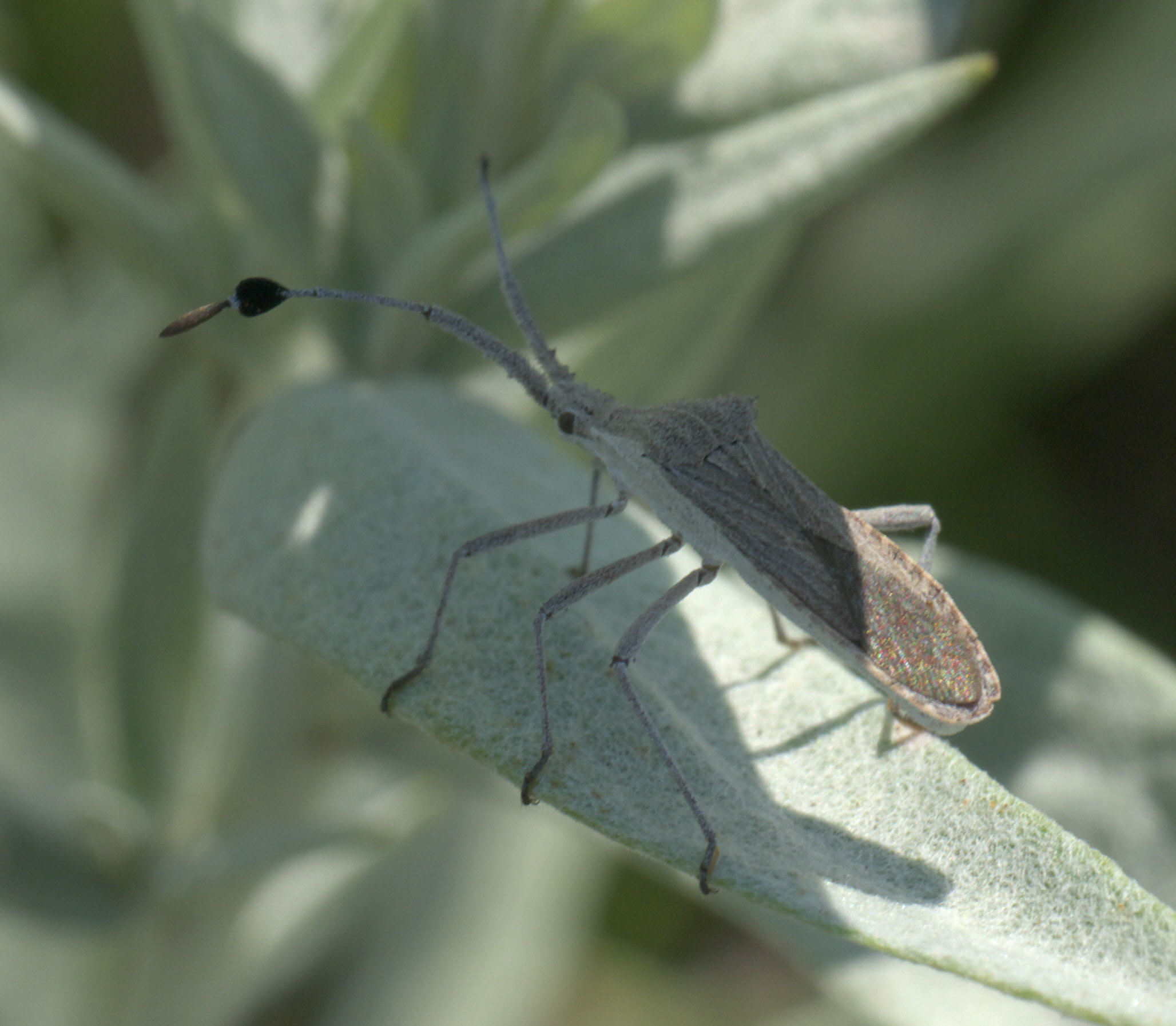
- Chariesterus antennator

Scientific classification
- Domain: Eukaryota
- Kingdom: Animalia
- Phylum: Arthropoda
- Class: Insecta
- Order: Hemiptera
- Suborder: Heteroptera
- Family: Coreidae
- Subfamily: Coreinae
- Tribe: Chariesterini
- Genus: Chariesterus; Laporte, 1833

= Chariesterus =

Genus of true bugs

Chariesterus is a genus of leaf-footed bugs in the family Coreidae. There are about 12 described species in Chariesterus.

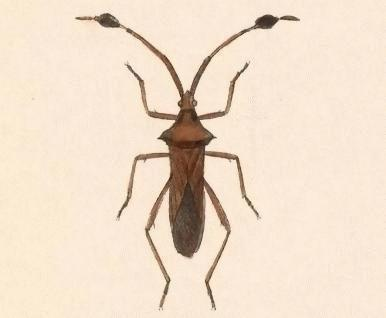
Chariesterus robustus

== Species ==
These 12 species belong to the genus Chariesterus:

- Chariesterus albiventris Burmeister, 1835
- Chariesterus alternatus Distant, 1881
- Chariesterus antennator (Fabricius, 1803) (euphorbia bug)
- Chariesterus armatus (Thunberg, 1825)
- Chariesterus bahamensis Ruckes, 1955
- Chariesterus balli Fracker, 1919
- Chariesterus brevipennis Van Duzee, 1937
- Chariesterus cuspidatus Distant, 1892
- Chariesterus gracilicornis Stål, 1870
- Chariesterus moestus Burmeister, 1835
- Chariesterus pardalinus Ruckes, 1955
- Chariesterus robustus Distant, 1892
