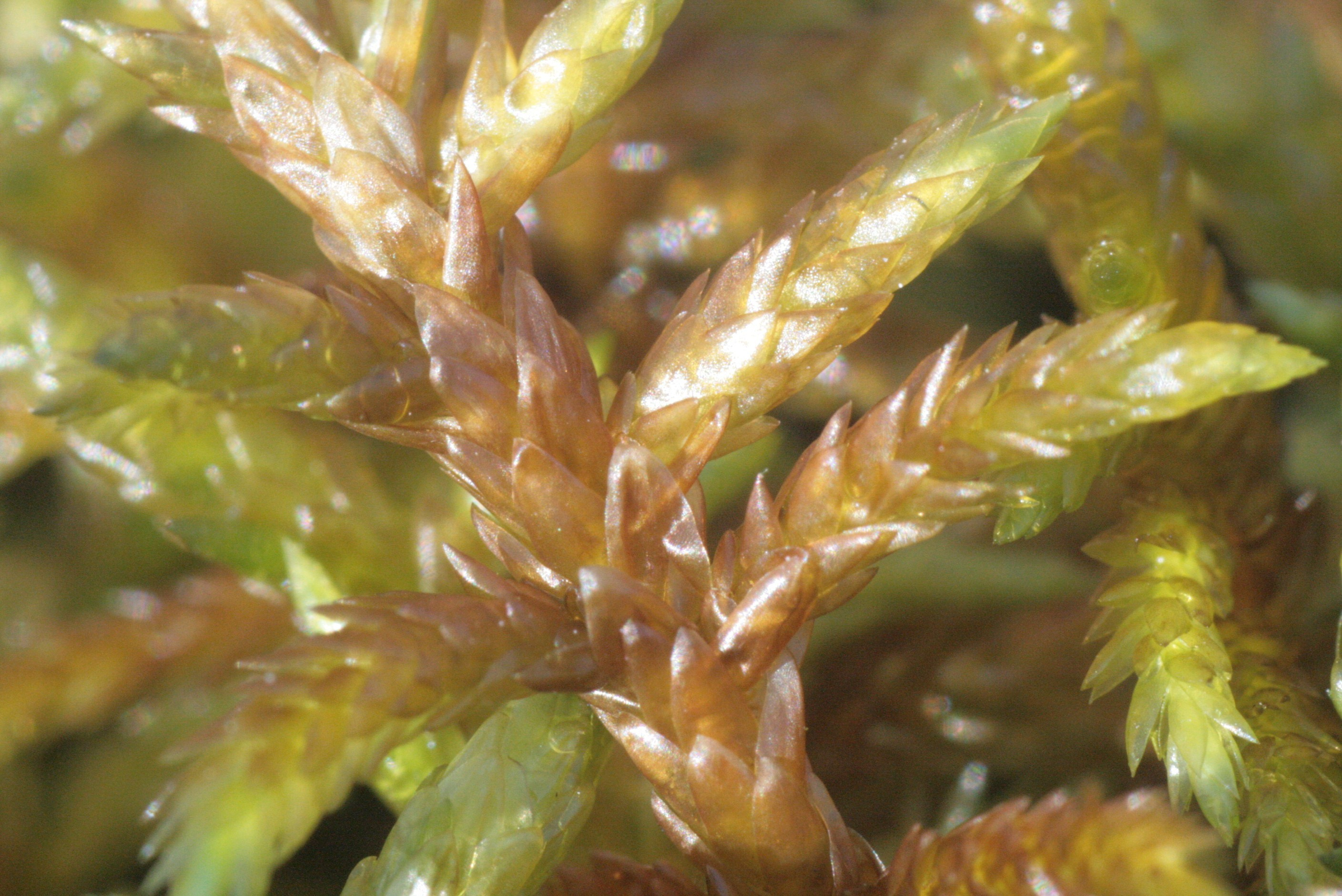
- Entodon concinnus

Scientific classification
- Kingdom: Plantae
- Division: Bryophyta
- Class: Bryopsida
- Subclass: Bryidae
- Order: Hypnales
- Family: Entodontaceae
- Genus: Entodon
- Species: E. concinnus

Binomial name
- Entodon concinnus Paris, 1904

= Entodon concinnus =

Species of moss

Entodon concinnus is a species of moss belonging to the family Entodontaceae.

It has cosmopolitan distribution.
