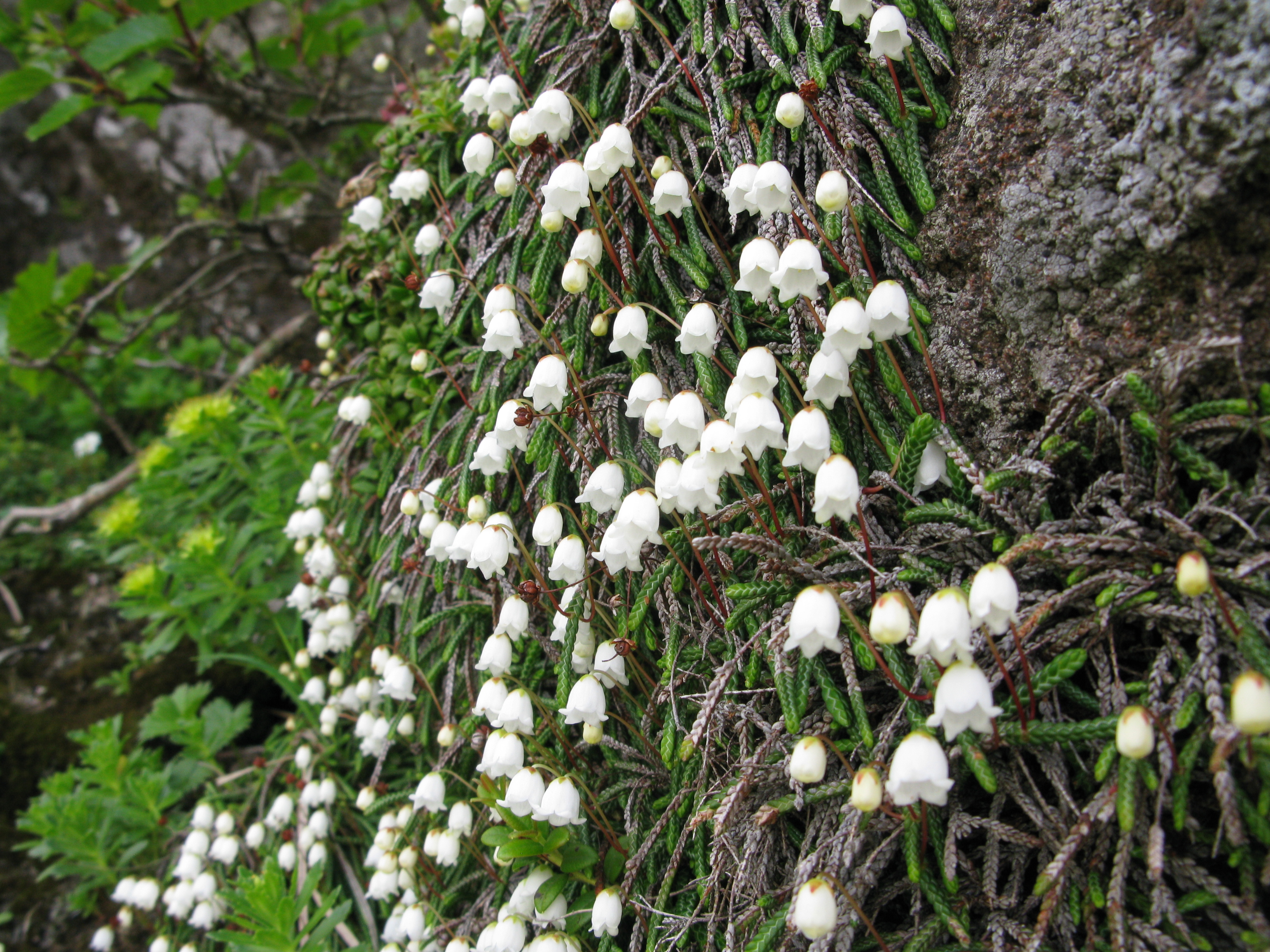
- Cassiope lycopodioides on Mount Chōkai, Yamagata Prefecture, Japan

Scientific classification
- Kingdom: Plantae
- Clade: Tracheophytes
- Clade: Angiosperms
- Clade: Eudicots
- Clade: Asterids
- Order: Ericales
- Family: Ericaceae
- Genus: Cassiope
- Species: C. lycopodioides

Binomial name
- Cassiope lycopodioides (Pall.) D. Don

Synonyms
- Andromeda lycopodioides Pall.; Cassiope lycopodioides var. cristapilosa (Calder & R.L.Taylor) B.Boivin; Cassiope lycopodioides subsp. cristapilosa Calder & Roy L.Taylor; Erica lycopodioides Waitz; Ericoides lycopodiodes (Waitz) Kuntze

= Cassiope lycopodioides =

Clubmoss mountain-heather

Species of flowering plant

Cassiope lycopodioides is a plant species in the family Ericaceae, known by the common names clubmoss mountain-heather or Haida Gwaii mountain-heather. The species is native to northeast Asia and northwestern North America, where it grows on rocky slopes and crevices in arctic tundra and alpine tundra at elevations up to 2000 m.

== Description ==
Cassiope lycopodioides is a perennial herb forming mats lying close to the ground. Leaves are narrow, up to 3 mm long, closely pressed against the stem. Curled hairs are present at the leaf tips, especially on younger leaves, and most populations (with the exception of those on Haida Gwaii) display hyaline or scarious leaf margins. Flowers are white, campanulate (bell-shaped), up to 20 mm across, and with a calyx of five fused sepals, often red or reddish green.

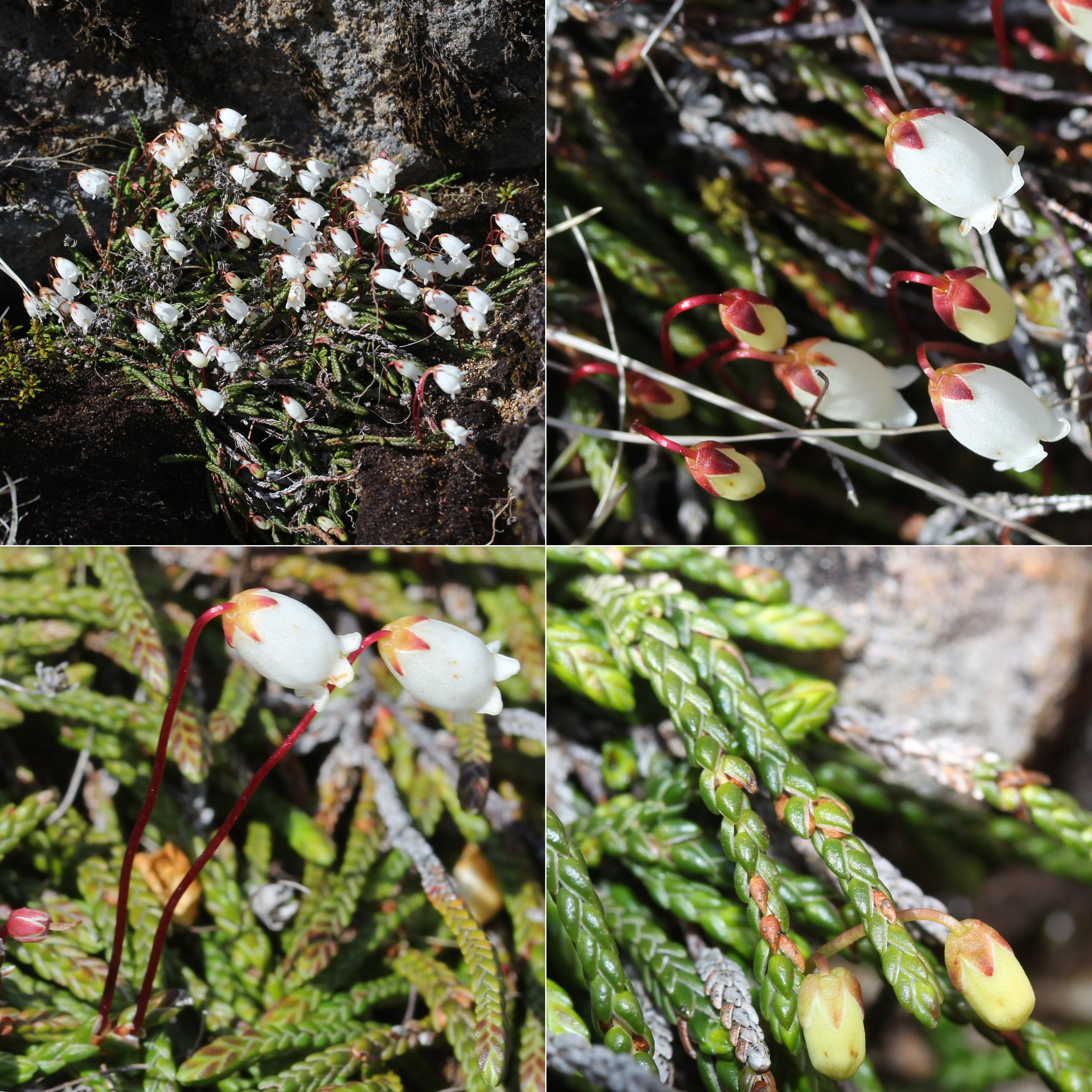
Cassiope lycopodioides on Mount Yake, Hida Mountains, Takayama, Gifu Prefecture, Japan

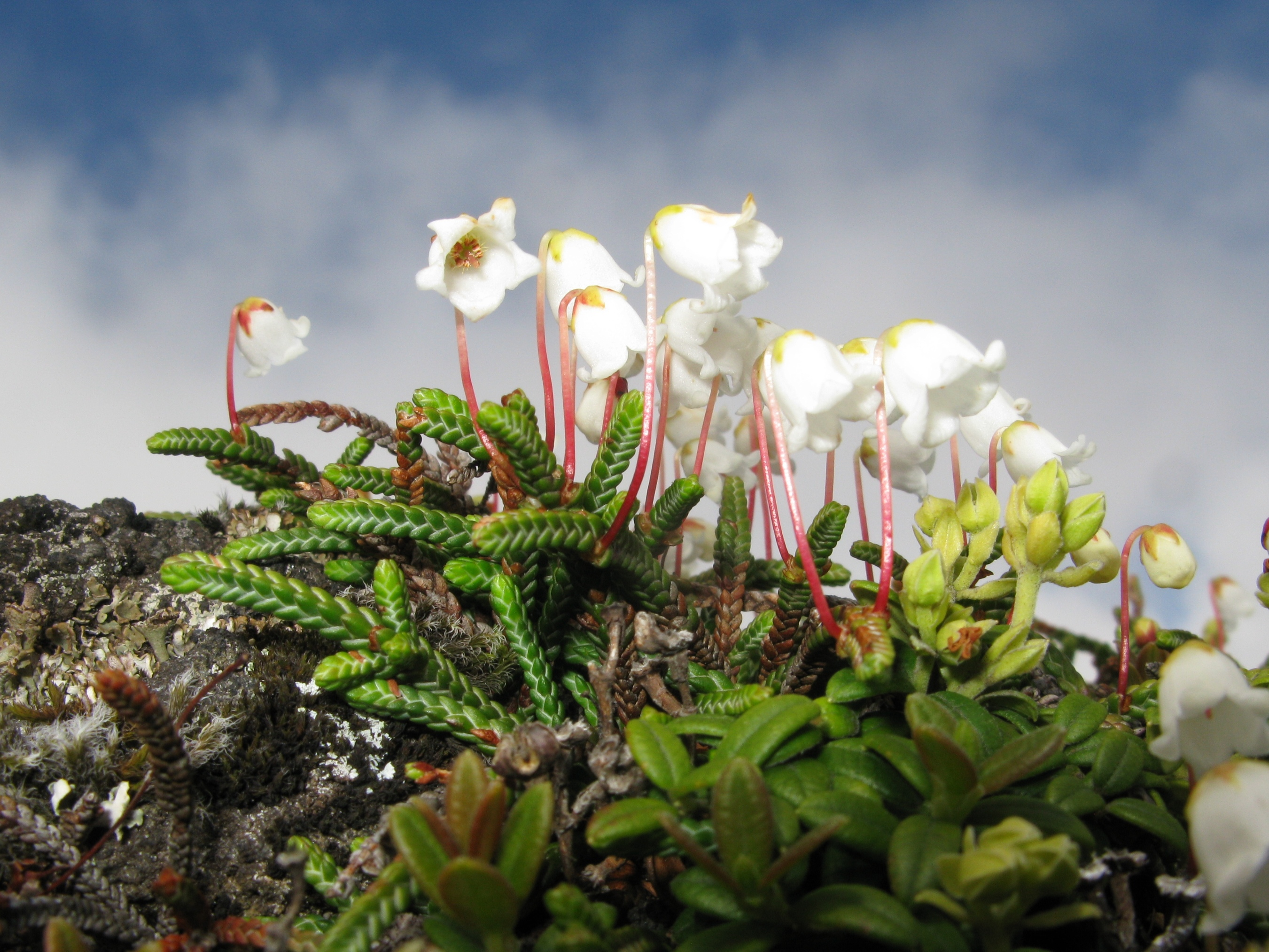
Cassiope lycopodioides on Mount Chōkai, Yamagata Prefecture, Japan

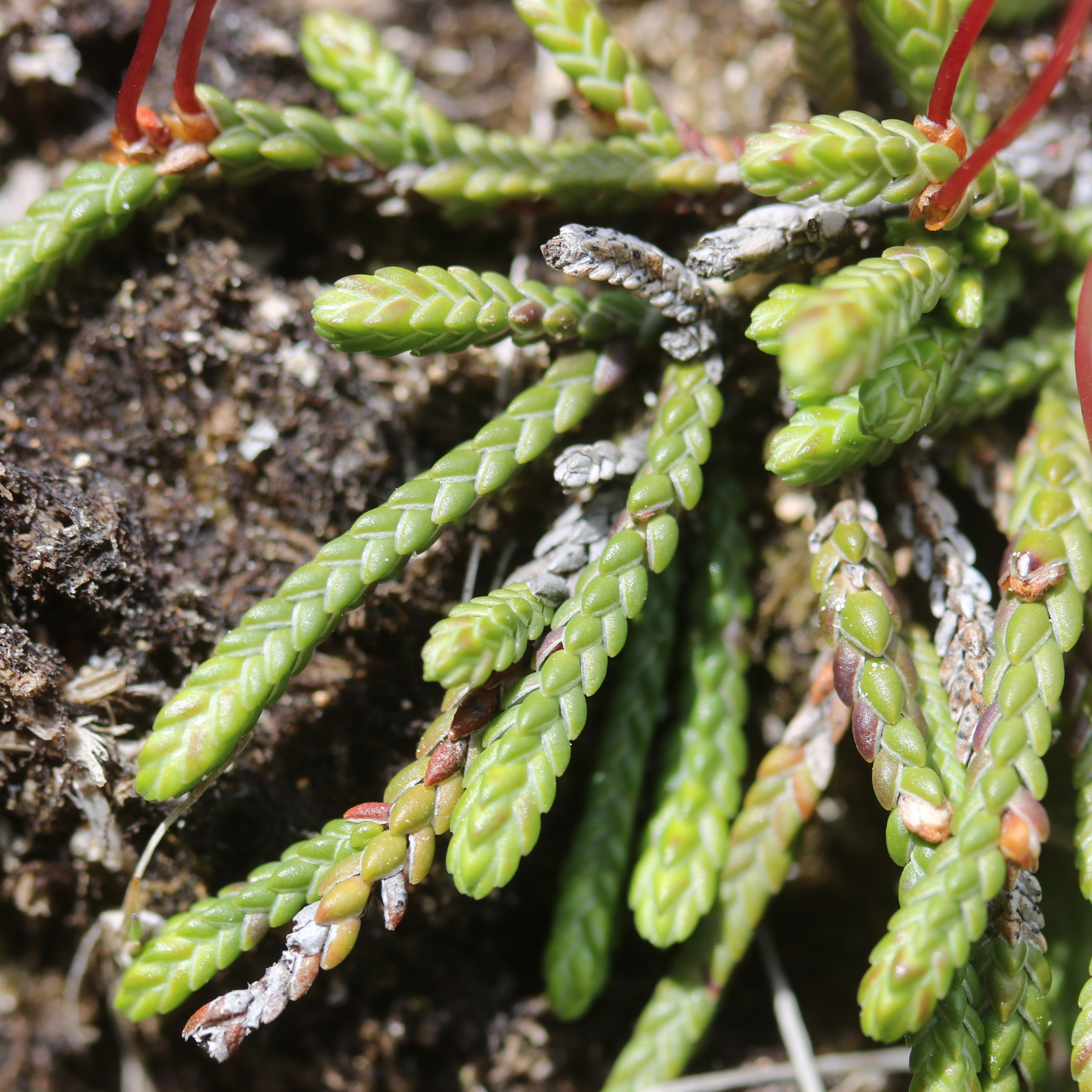
Closeup of leaves. Mount Yake, Hida Mountains, Takayama, Gifu Prefecture, Japan

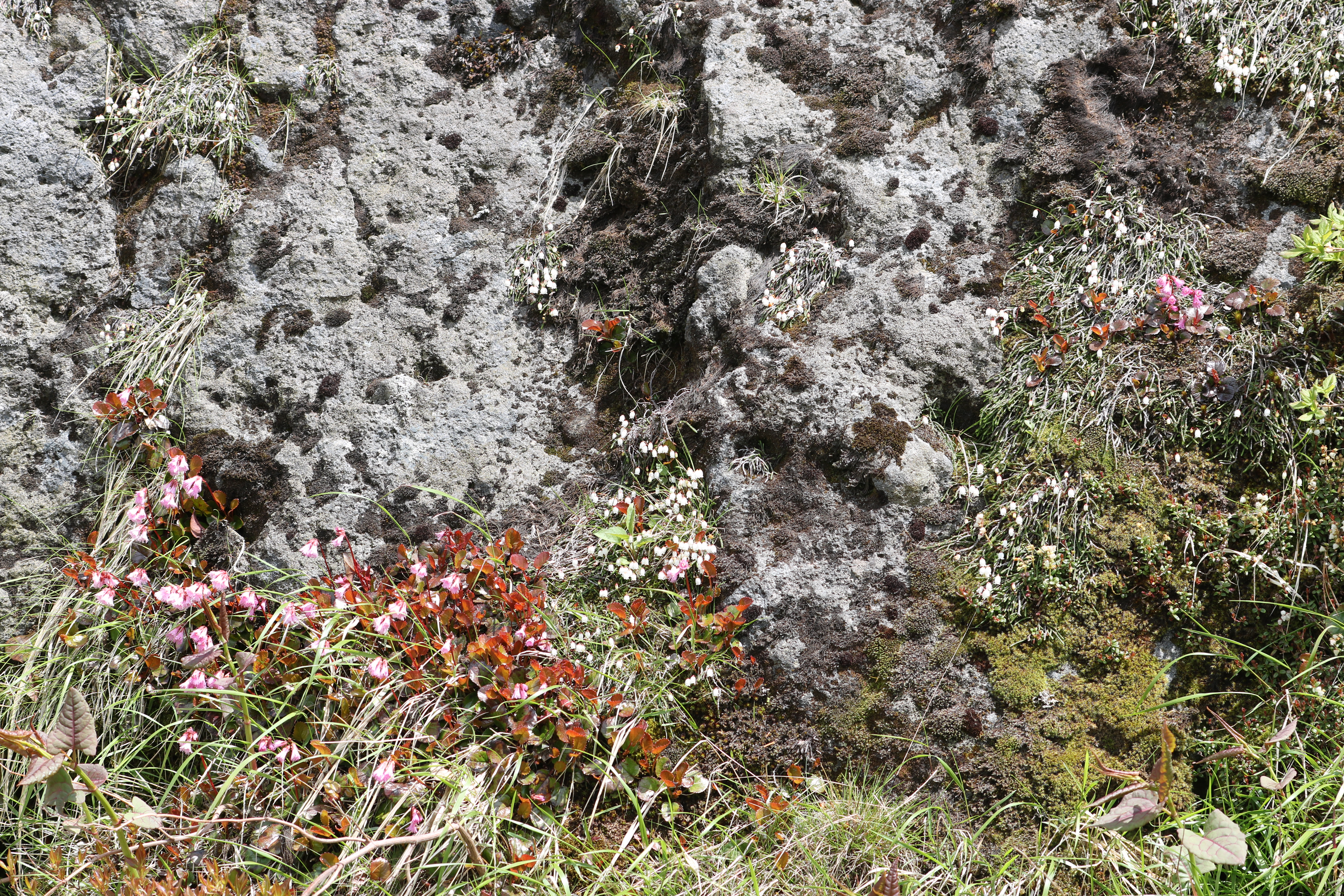
Cassiope lycopodioides in habitat, with Schizocodon soldanelloides var. soldanelloides f. alpinus in the bottom left corner. Mount Yake, Hida Mountains, Takayama, Gifu Prefecture, Japan

== Distribution ==
The distribution of Cassiope lycopodioides spans an arc of the northern Pacific Rim, extending from northeast Asia over to northwestern North America. In Asia, the species ranges from high elevations on Honshu and Hokkaido in Japan, north through coastal mountain ranges and tundra of the Russian Far East.

In North America, the species is found across the Aleutian Islands into southern Alaska, coastal and interior British Columbia, and the U.S. State of Washington. Washington populations have been reported only from shaded alpine rock faces in King County and Snohomish County.

The specific epithet "lycopodioides" refers to the plant's superficial resemblance to some species of clubmoss (Lycopodium sensu lato).

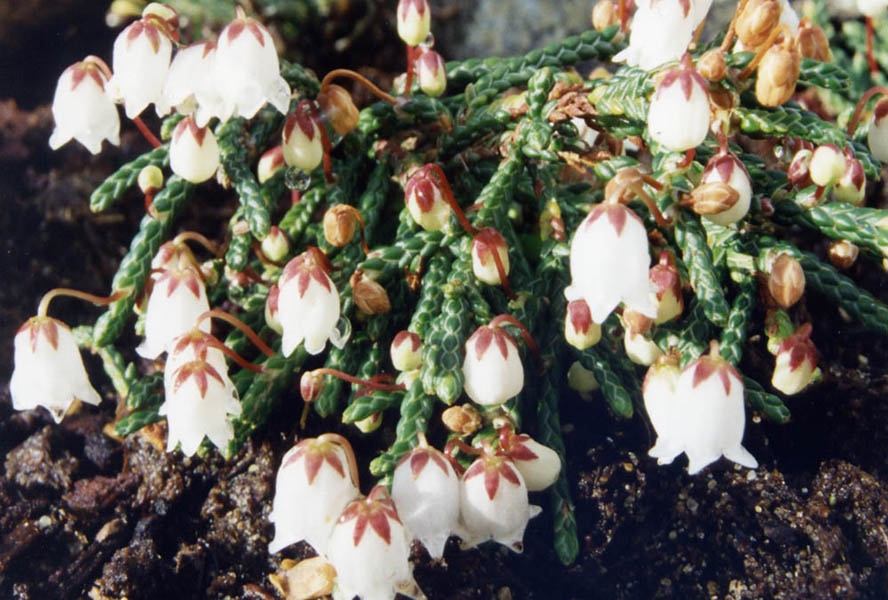
Cultivated specimen, cultivar 'Beatrice Lilley'

== Taxonomy ==
Cassiope lycopodioides subsp. cristapilosa, known only from the Haida Gwaii (formerly called the Queen Charlotte Islands), is recognized as a distinct taxon by some authorities but not others. The distinction is based on morphological differences between Haida Gwaii plants and other populations, such as the lack of a hyaline margin to the leaf, and longer pedicels and corollas.

Phylogenetic studies of Japan populations revealed genetic divergence between populations from central Honshu and populations from northern Honshu into Hokkaido; these are theorized to be two distinct colonizations of the species during different glaciation events during the Pleistocene, following a biogeographical pattern reflected by other alpine plant species in the archipelago.
