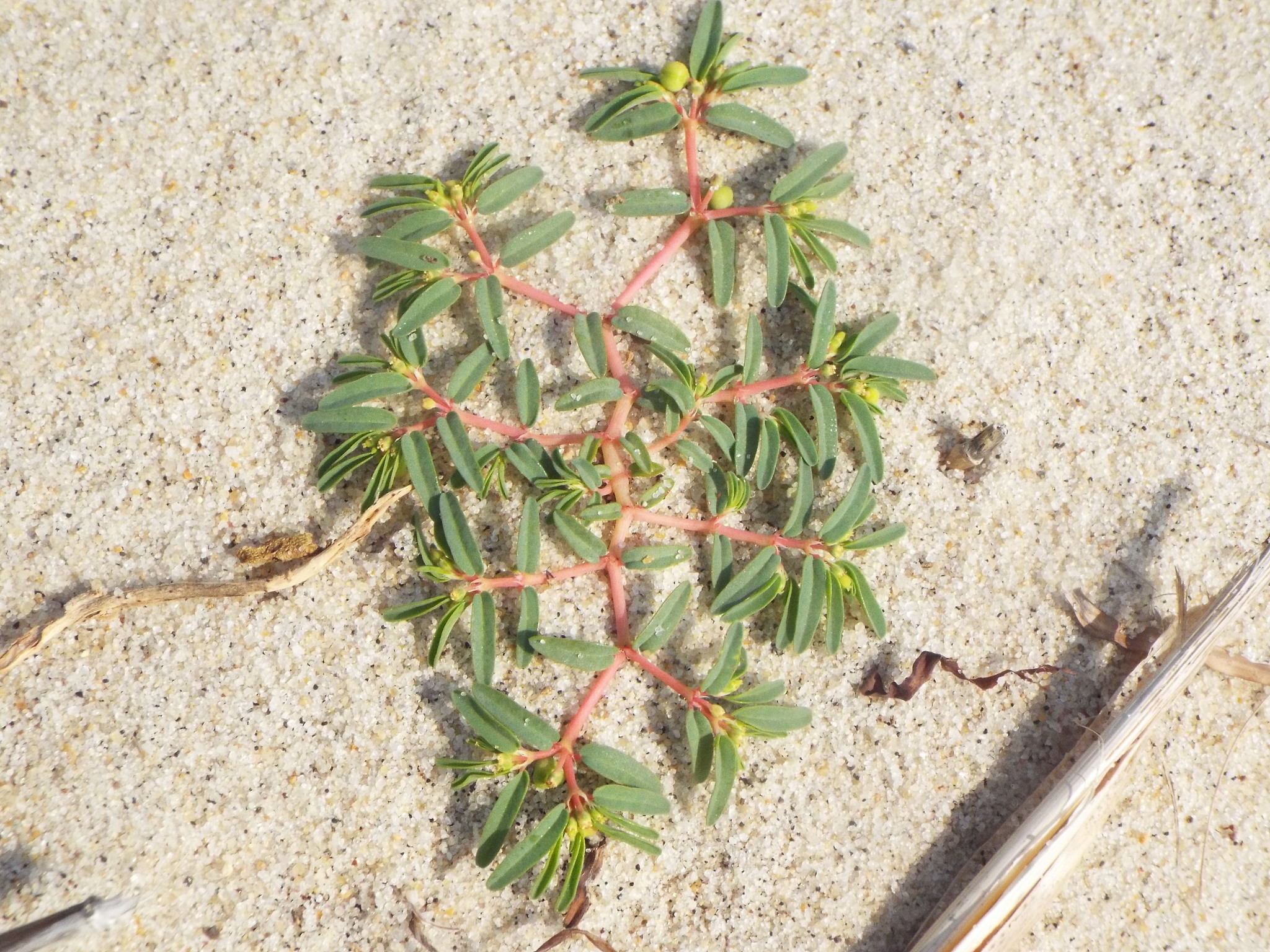

Scientific classification
- Kingdom: Plantae
- Clade: Embryophytes
- Clade: Tracheophytes
- Clade: Spermatophytes
- Clade: Angiosperms
- Clade: Eudicots
- Clade: Rosids
- Order: Malpighiales
- Family: Euphorbiaceae
- Genus: Euphorbia
- Species: E. polygonifolia

Binomial name
- Euphorbia polygonifolia L. (1753)

Synonyms
- Anisophyllum polygonifolium (L.) Haw. (1812); Chamaesyce polygonifolia (L.) Small (1903); Euphorbia maritima Nutt. (1835); Xamesike polygonifolia (L.) Raf. (1840)

= Euphorbia polygonifolia =

Seaside sandmat

Species of plant

Euphorbia polygonifolia, known by the common names of seaside sandmat and seaside spurge, is a member of the spurge family, Euphorbiaceae. It is an annual herb, native to the east coast of the United States and the Great Lakes. It has also been introduced to the Atlantic coasts of France and Spain.
