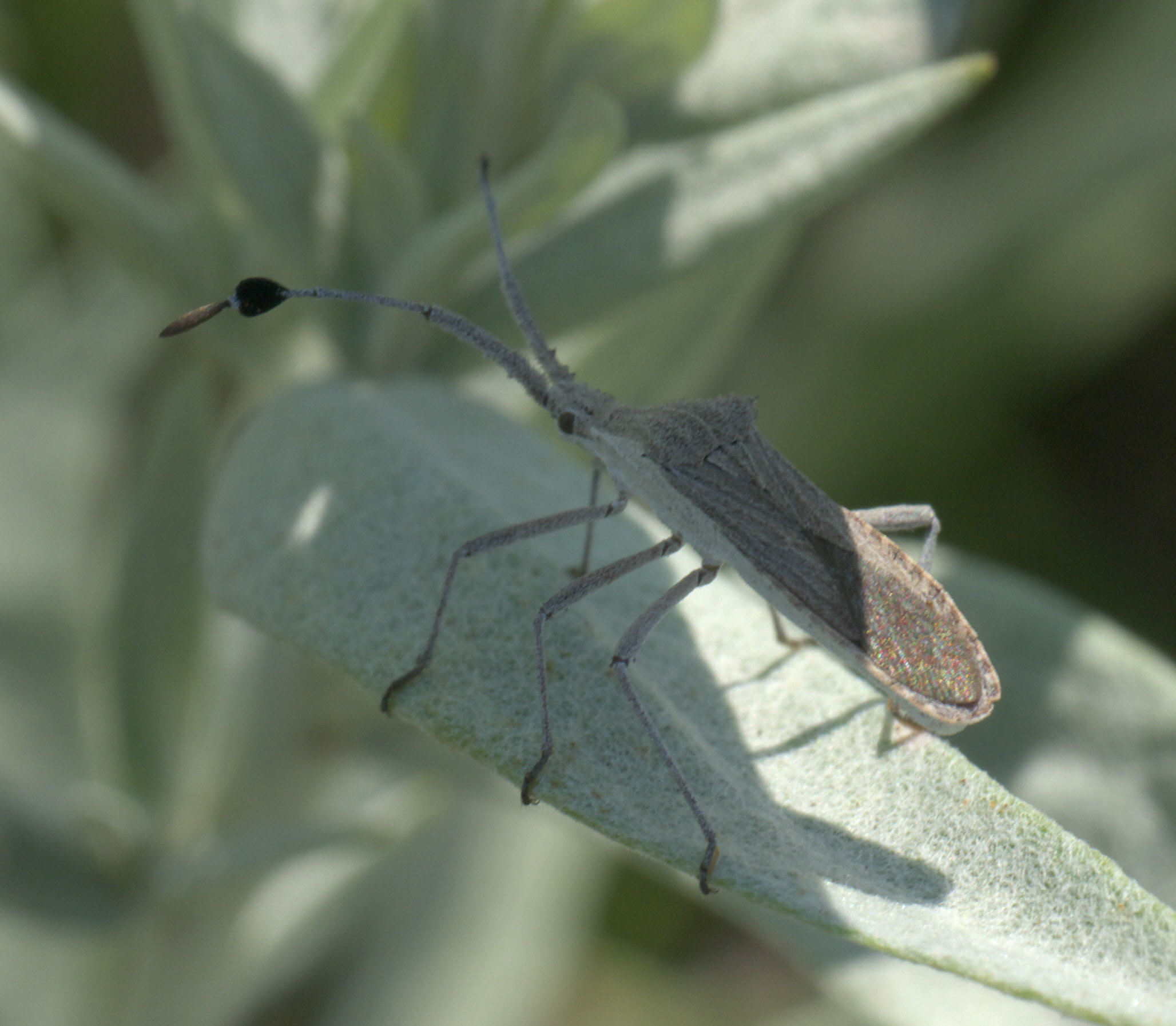
- Chariesterus antennator

Scientific classification
- Kingdom: Animalia
- Phylum: Arthropoda
- Clade: Pancrustacea
- Class: Insecta
- Order: Hemiptera
- Suborder: Heteroptera
- Family: Coreidae
- Subfamily: Coreinae
- Tribe: Chariesterini; Stål, 1868

= Chariesterini =

Tribe of true bugs

Chariesterini is a tribe of leaf-footed bugs in the family Coreidae. There are at least 4 genera and more than 20 described species in Chariesterini.

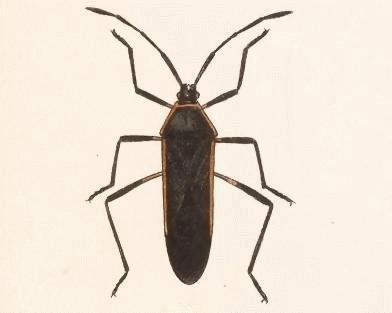
Staluptus marginalis

== Genera ==
These four genera belong to the tribe Chariesterini:

- Chariesterus Laporte, 1833
- Plapigus Stål, 1860
- Ruckesius Yonke, 1972
- Staluptus Stål, 1860
