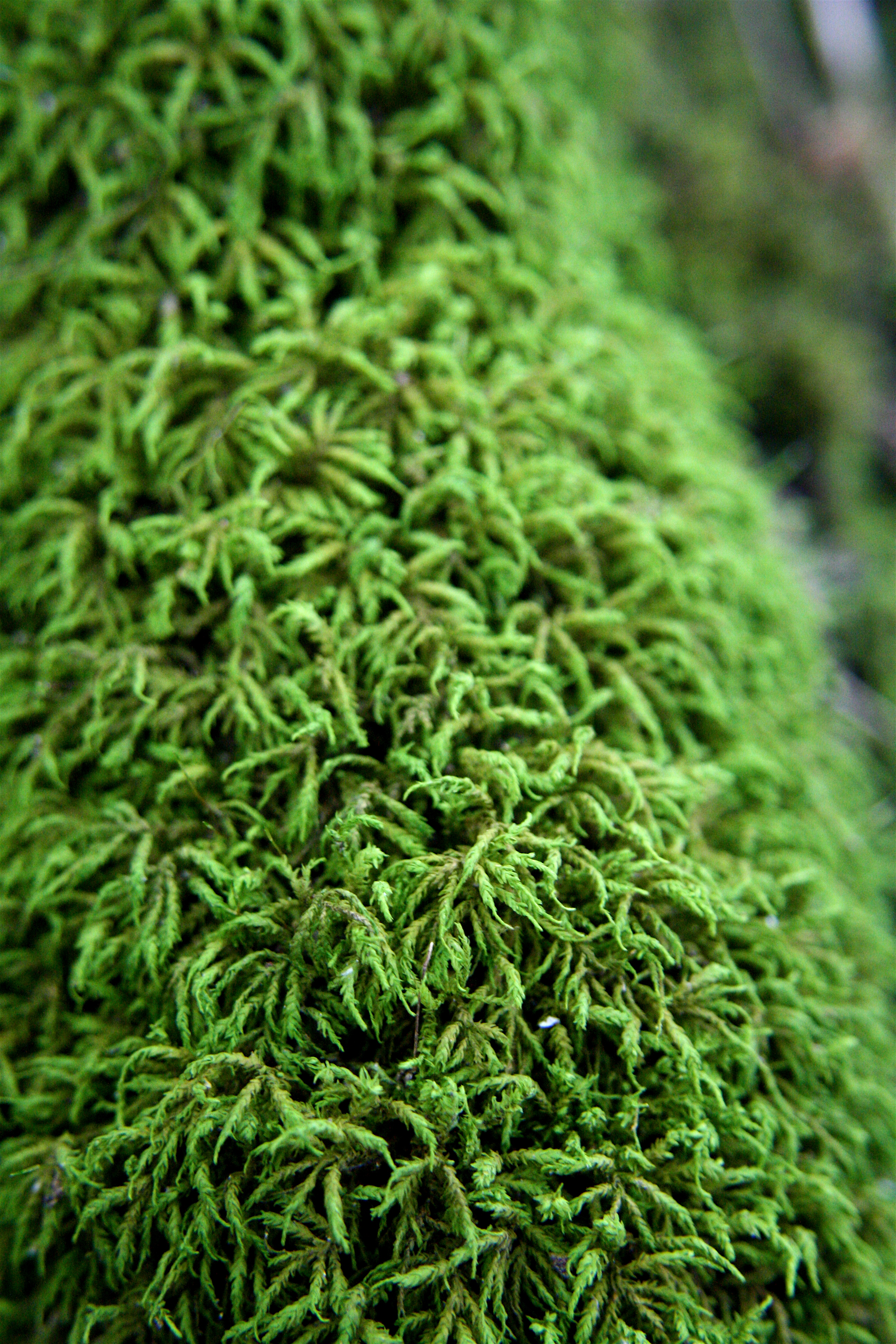

Conservation status
- Secure (NatureServe)

Scientific classification
- Kingdom: Plantae
- Division: Bryophyta
- Class: Bryopsida
- Subclass: Bryidae
- Order: Hypnales
- Family: Entodontaceae
- Genus: Entodon
- Species: E. seductrix

Binomial name
- Entodon seductrix (Hedw.) Müll. Hal.

Synonyms
- Neckera seductrix

= Entodon seductrix =

Species of moss

Entodon seductrix, known as the seductive entodon moss or round-stem silk moss, is a species of Entodontaceae.

Entodon seductrix is one of several moss species previously described and named as one species, Neckera seductrix by Johann Hedwig. He was a German botanist who made many contributions to the study of mosses and is sometimes called the “father of bryology”. His description and naming of Neckera seductrix was published in Species Muscorum Frondosorum posthumously in 1801.

German bryologist Carl Müller described it further and gave it its current scientific name in Linnaea published in 1846.
