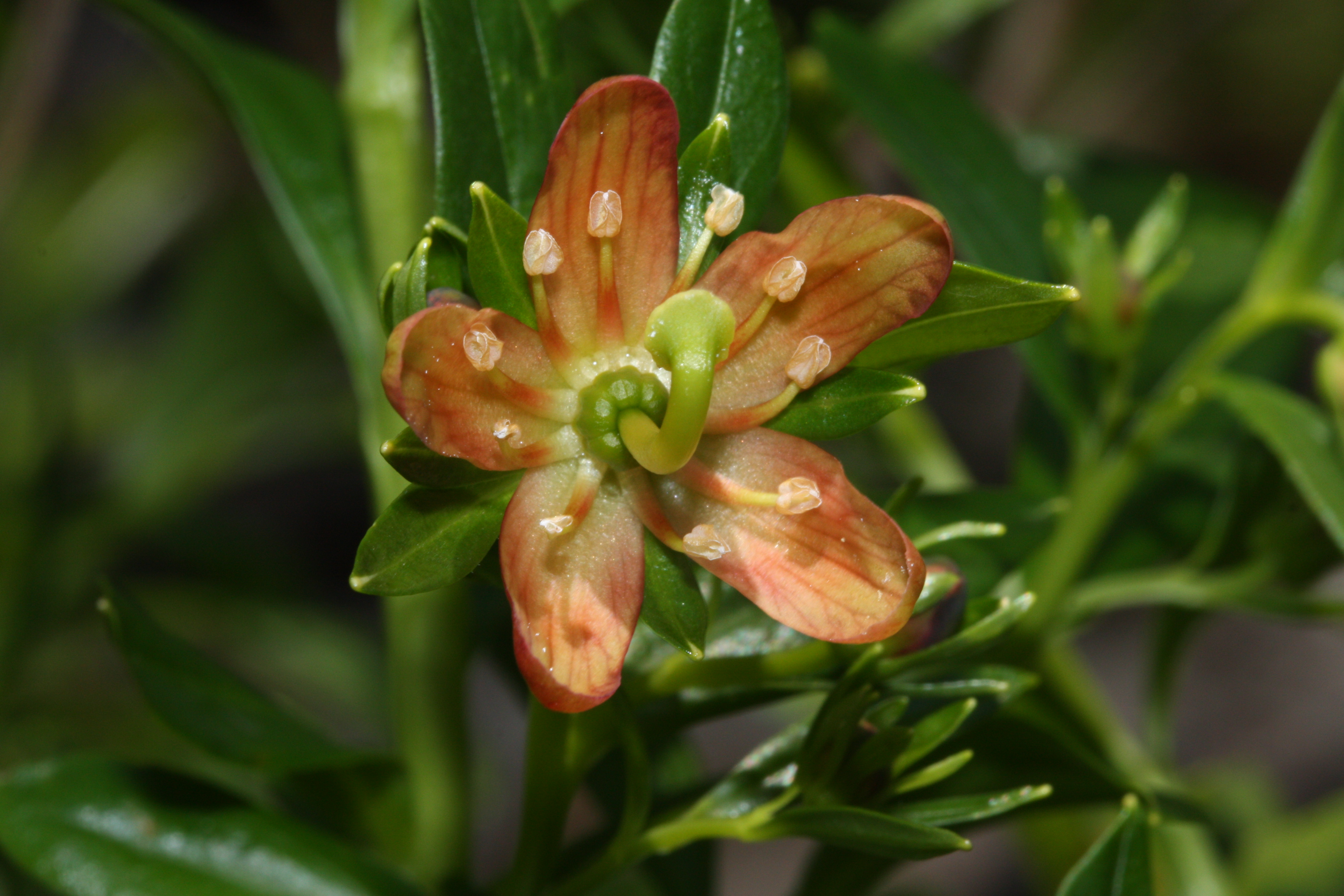

Conservation status
- Secure (NatureServe)

Scientific classification
- Kingdom: Plantae
- Clade: Tracheophytes
- Clade: Angiosperms
- Clade: Eudicots
- Clade: Asterids
- Order: Ericales
- Family: Ericaceae
- Genus: Elliottia
- Species: E. pyroliflora

Binomial name
- Elliottia pyroliflora (Bong.) S.W.Brim & P.F.Stevens

= Elliottia pyroliflora =

Species of flowering plant

Elliottia pyroliflora, the copperbush, is a plant in the family Ericaceae native to North America. It is a perennial shrub. Its leaves are alternate in arrangement with flat margins.

== Distribution and habitat ==
The plant is found in the Northwestern United States in Oregon, Washington, and Alaska, and in Western Canada in British Columbia. Its habitats include mountainous regions, stream banks, and forest edges.
