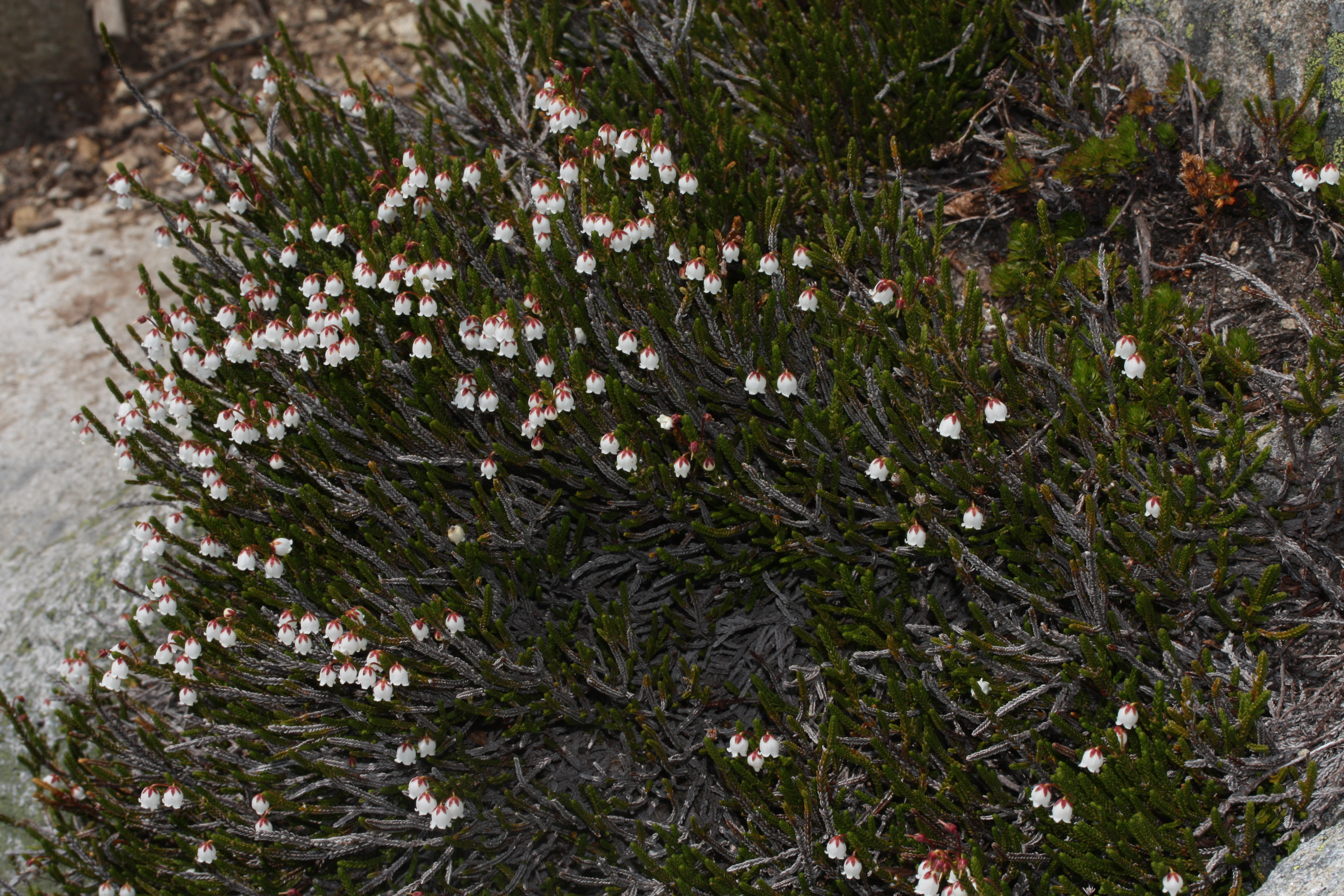

Scientific classification
- Kingdom: Plantae
- Clade: Tracheophytes
- Clade: Angiosperms
- Clade: Eudicots
- Clade: Asterids
- Order: Ericales
- Family: Ericaceae
- Genus: Cassiope
- Species: C. mertensiana

Binomial name
- Cassiope mertensiana (Bong.) G. Don

= Cassiope mertensiana =

Species of flowering plant

Cassiope mertensiana is a species of flowering plant known by the common names western moss heather and white mountain heather.

This heather is native to subalpine areas of western North America, from Alaska to the mountains of California. It is a small, branching shrub which forms patches along the ground and in rocky crevices.

== Description ==
Cassiope mertensiana has short, erect, snakelike stems that are covered in tiny leathery scalelike leaves only a few millimeters long. From between the layers of scale leaves emerge reddish pedicels each bearing a petite, hanging, down-facing, bell-shaped flower. The bractlets are red and the contrasting flower is white.

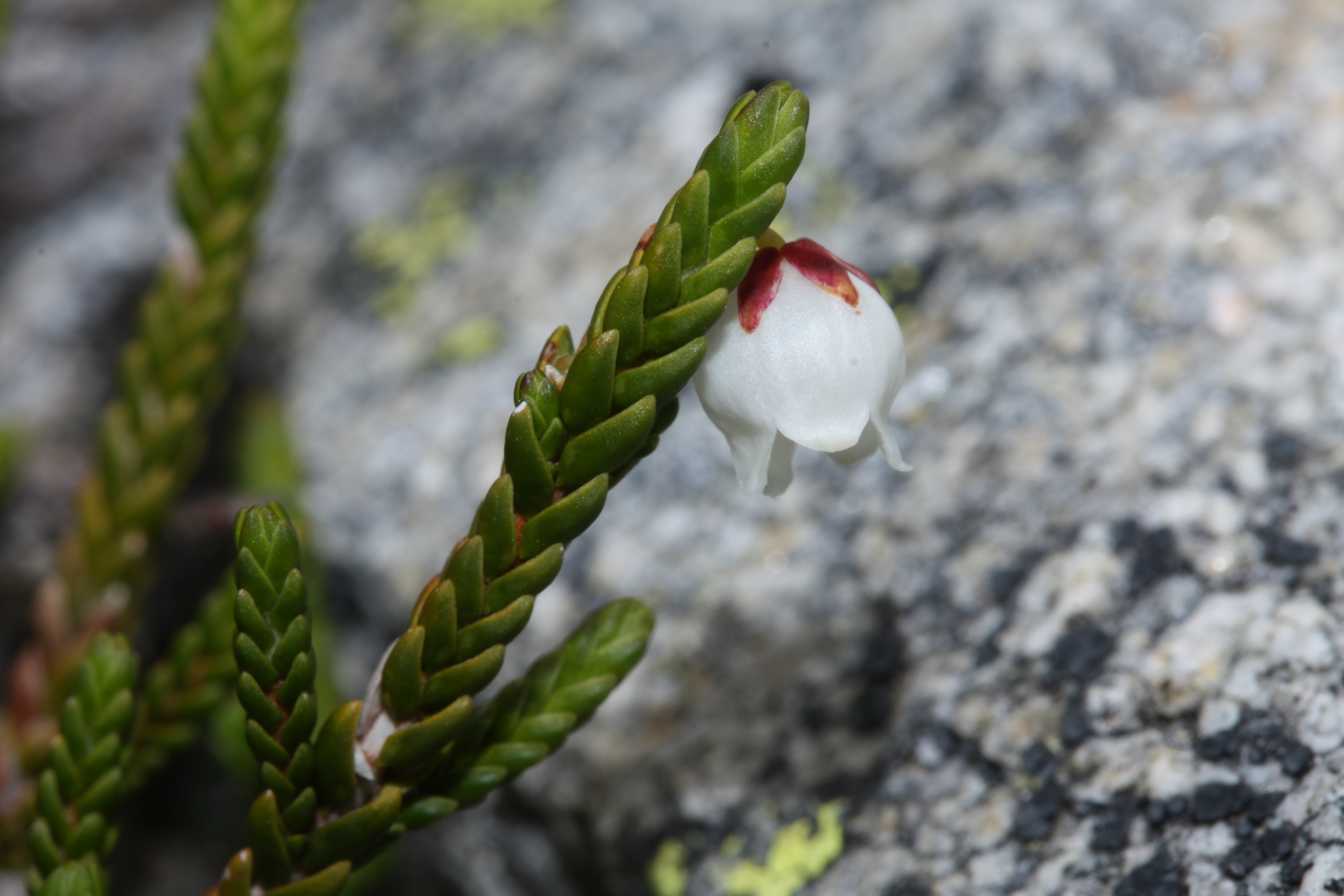
The white flower contrasts with the red bractlets.

Although the shrub tends to grow in areas where there is a lot of accumulation of snow, adequate rain precipitation is needed for the continued growth of Cassiope Mertensiana. The shrub must be exposed to enough sunlight and warmer conditions for proper growth during the growing season.
