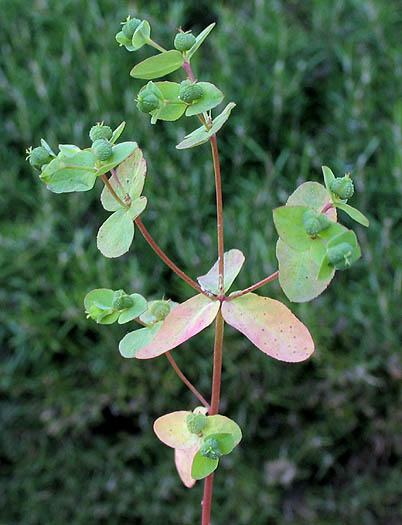

Conservation status
- Secure (NatureServe)

Scientific classification
- Kingdom: Plantae
- Clade: Tracheophytes
- Clade: Angiosperms
- Clade: Eudicots
- Clade: Rosids
- Order: Malpighiales
- Family: Euphorbiaceae
- Genus: Euphorbia
- Species: E. spathulata

Binomial name
- Euphorbia spathulata Lam.

Synonyms
- Euphorbia alta Euphorbia arkansana Euphorbia dictyosperma Euphorbia obtusata Galarhoeus arkansanus Galarhoeus obtusatus Tithymalus arkansanus Tithymalus missouriensis Tithymalus obtusatus Tithymalus spathulatus

= Euphorbia spathulata =

Species of flowering plant

Euphorbia spathulata is a species of spurge known by the common names warty spurge and roughpod spurge.

It is native to the Americas, where it is widespread in many habitats.

== Description ==
Euphorbia spathulata is an annual herb not exceeding half a meter in height with oval-shaped leaves one to three centimeters long. The upper stem may be bright to dull red and is hairless.

At the tips of the stems are inflorescences of tiny glandular flowers.

The fruit is a rounded green capsule a few millimeters wide with obvious bumps on the surface. It contains light brown netted seeds.
