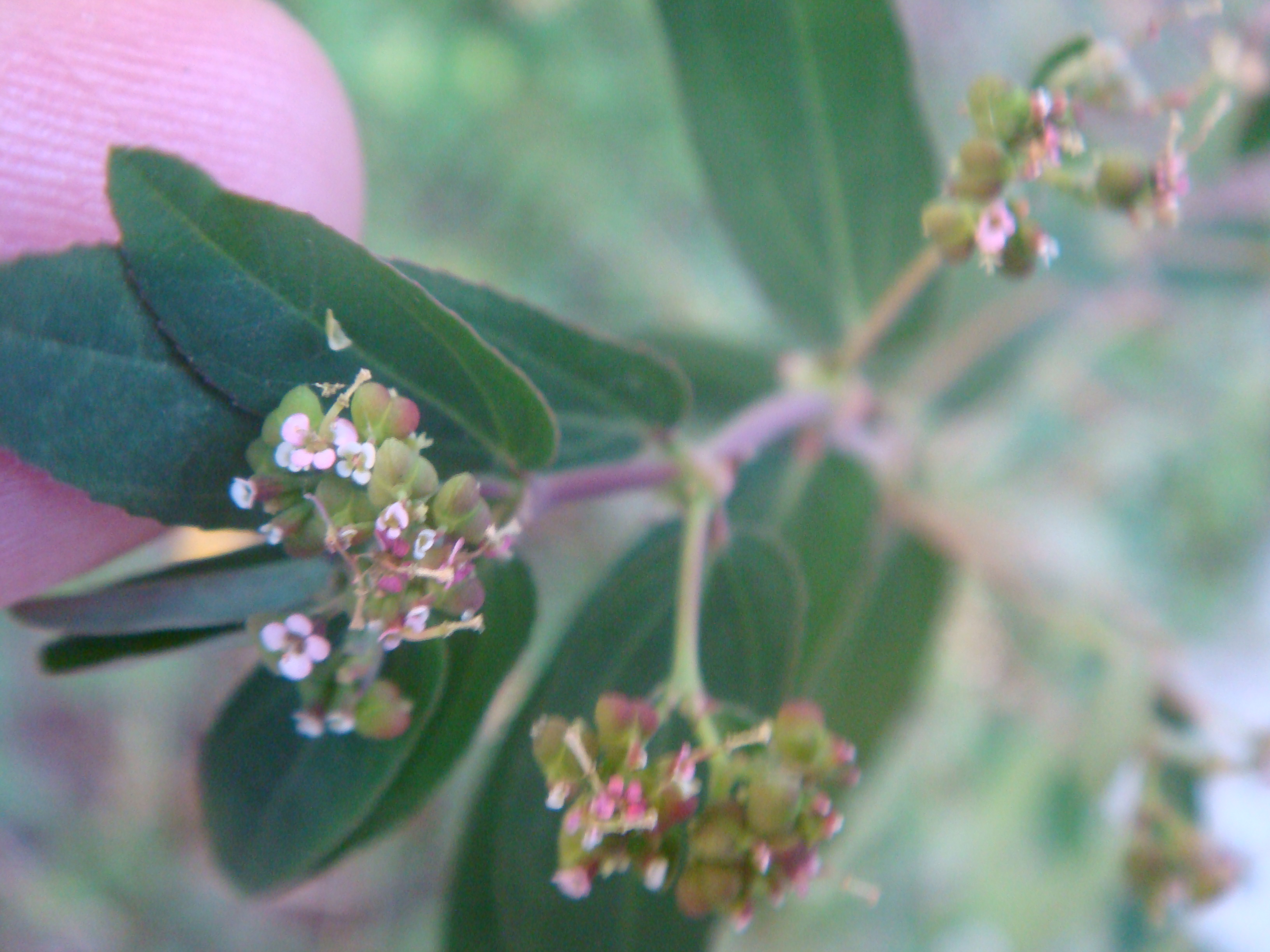

Conservation status
- Least Concern (IUCN 3.1)

Scientific classification
- Kingdom: Plantae
- Clade: Tracheophytes
- Clade: Angiosperms
- Clade: Eudicots
- Clade: Rosids
- Order: Malpighiales
- Family: Euphorbiaceae
- Genus: Euphorbia
- Species: E. nutans

Binomial name
- Euphorbia nutans Lag.

Synonyms
- Chamaesyce nutans (Lag.) Small; Tithymalus nutans (Lag.) Samp; Euphorbia preslii Guss.; Euphorbia refracta Lowe; Euphorbia trinervis Bertol.; Chamaesyce preslii (Guss.) Arthur; Chamaesyce lansingii Millsp.; Euphorbia gibraltarica Wolley-Dod; Euphorbia pseudonutans Thell.; Euphorbia lansingii (Millsp.) Brühl

= Euphorbia nutans =

Species of flowering plant

Euphorbia nutans is a species of Euphorbia known by the common names eyebane and nodding spurge. It is native to much of the United States, Eastern Canada, Mexico, Central America, the Caribbean, and Venezuela.

It is reportedly naturalized in parts of Europe as well as in the Middle East, Japan, and New Zealand. It has also been introduced to California. It can be a noxious weed in areas where it has been introduced. As a weed it generally occurs on disturbed ground, or in ornamental flower beds.

== Description ==
Euphorbia nutans is an annual herb growing erect with pairs of oblong leaves along its stems. The leaf may be up to 3.5 centimetres (1.4 in) long, hairy or hairless, and finely toothed.

The inflorescence may be solitary or borne in clusters. Each inflorescence is a cyathium, with flat white or red appendages surrounding the actual flowers. At the center of the array of appendages are several staminate flowers surrounding one pistillate flower. The latter develops into a fruit, which is a capsule about 2 millimetres (0.079 in) wide.
