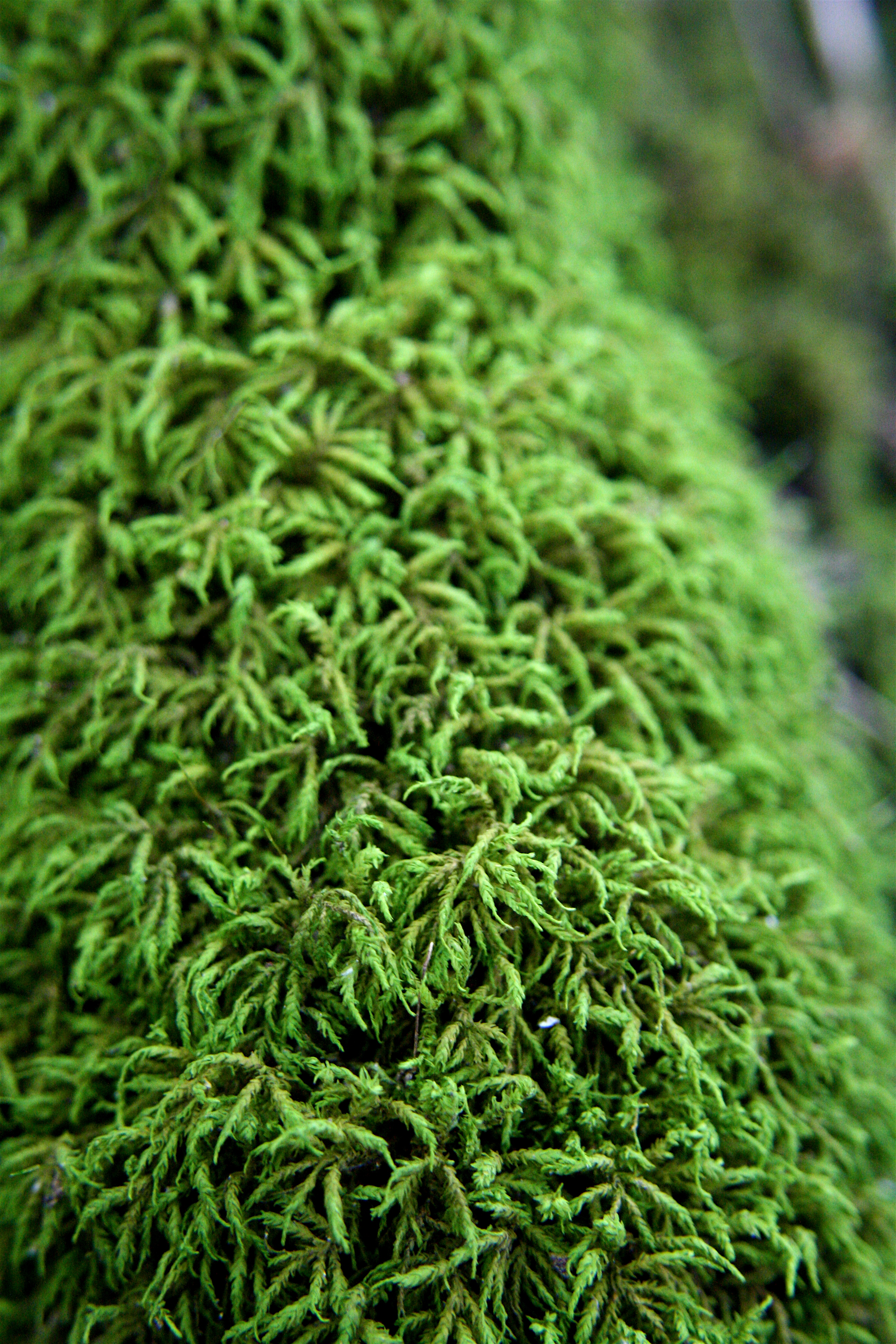
- Entodon seductrix

Scientific classification
- Kingdom: Plantae
- Division: Bryophyta
- Class: Bryopsida
- Subclass: Bryidae
- Order: Hypnales
- Family: Entodontaceae; Kindb.

= Entodontaceae =

Family of plants

Entodontaceae is a family of mosses belonging to the order Hypnales.

== Genera ==
As accepted by GBIF:

- Entodon Müll.Hal. (137)
- Erythrodontium Hampe (12)
- Mesondon Hampe (1)
- Pylaisiobryum Broth. (1)

The figures in parentheses denote how many species in each genus.

=== Formerly included ===
- Cribrodontium – synonym of Entodon
- Cylindrothecium – synonym of Entodon
- Holmgrenia – synonym of Orthothecium
- Nanothecium – genus in Hypnaceae
- Plagiotheciopsis – genus in Hypnaceae
- Pseudoscleropodium – now in Brachytheciaceae
- Retidens – synonym of Entodon
- Rozea – now in Leskeaceae
- Sakuraia – synonym of Entodon
- Trachyphyllum – now in Pylaisiadelphaceae
