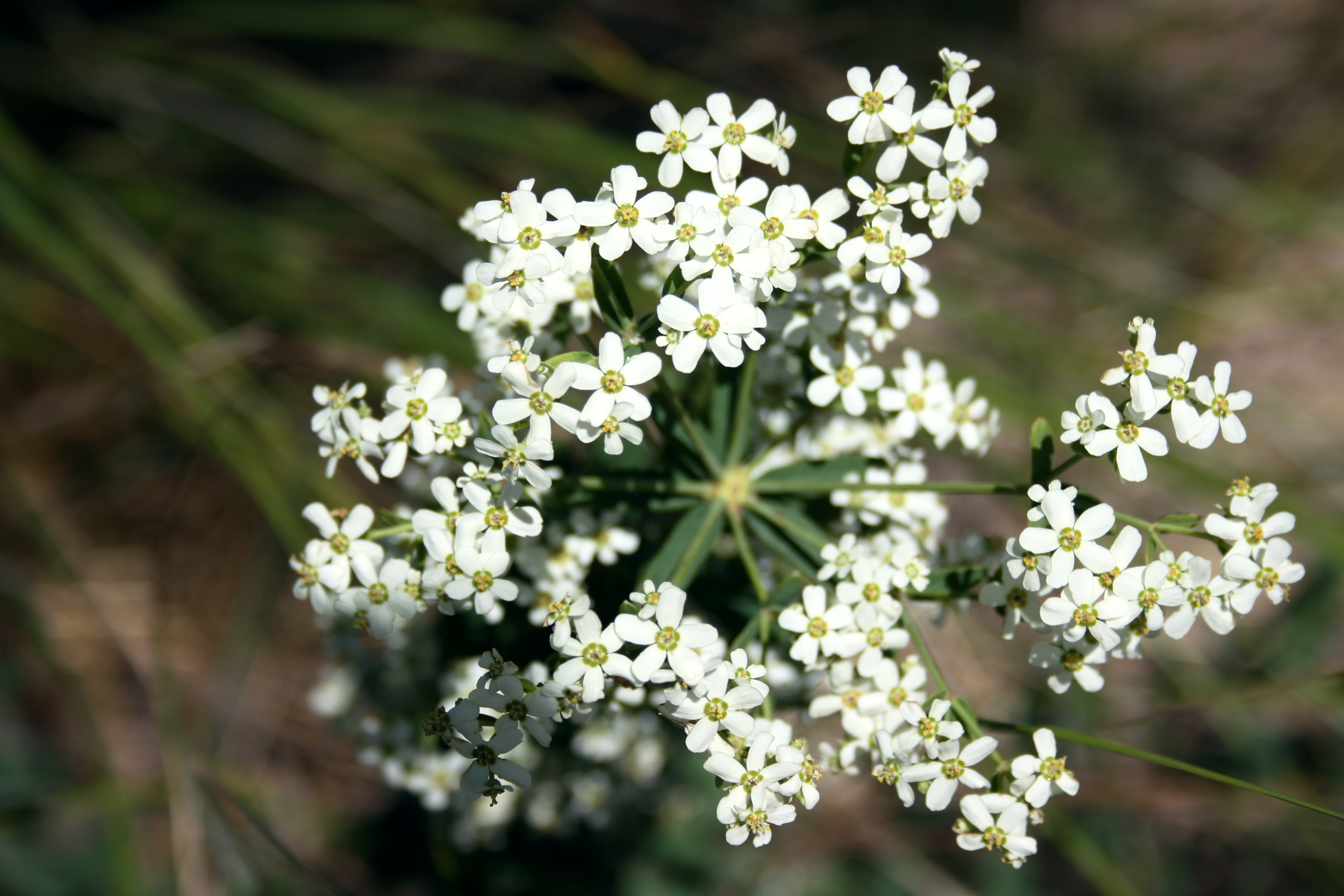
- Euphorbia corollata in Michigan, USA

Conservation status
- Secure (NatureServe)

Scientific classification
- Kingdom: Plantae
- Clade: Tracheophytes
- Clade: Angiosperms
- Clade: Eudicots
- Clade: Rosids
- Order: Malpighiales
- Family: Euphorbiaceae
- Genus: Euphorbia
- Species: E. corollata

Binomial name
- Euphorbia corollata L.

= Euphorbia corollata =

Flowering spurge

Species of flowering plant

Euphorbia corollata is an herbaceous perennial plant in the family Euphorbiaceae that is native to North America. A common name for the species is flowering spurge. It has a milky sap that can cause skin and eye irritation in some people. It grows up to 1 m (3 ft) tall, with smooth stems and light green leaves arranged alternately or in whorls. Leaves are about 10 mm (1/2 in) wide and 75 mm (3 in) long. Each stem terminates in a panicle 20 to 25 mm (3/4 to 1 in) across. Flowers are about 6 mm (1/4 in) across and consist of one pistillate and several staminate flowers surrounded by five white bracts - not petals but formed from the involucre at the base of the flowers. Flowering spurge blooms from June to September.

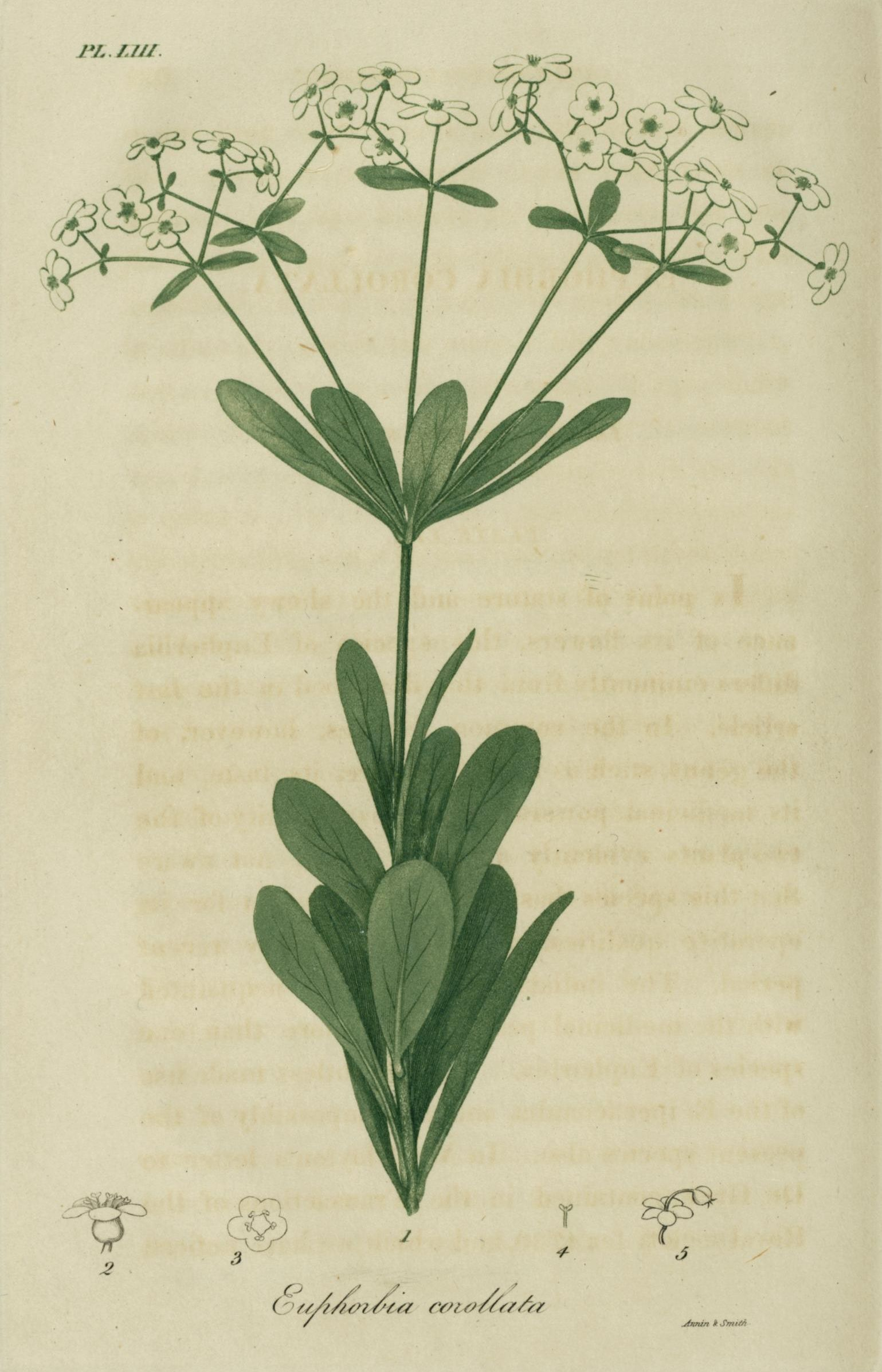
1. Euphorbia corollata, the top of a plant rather below the common size; 2. Barren flower; 3. Calyx not fully expanded; 4. Stamen; 5. Fertile flower

== Range and habitat ==
Flowering spurge grows in most soil types as long as they are well-drained. It is usually found in prairies, pastures, glades, and along roads and train tracks. It has excellent drought tolerance and develops a deep taproot. It is difficult to transplant once established.

Flowering spurge is native from Texas north to South Dakota and east to the Atlantic coast.

== Faunal associations ==
The flowers are pollinated by a variety of insects including bees, wasps, flies, and butterflies. Other insects feed on foliage, stems, and other parts of the plant, although mammals avoid it because of its toxic sap. Seeds are fed on by wild turkey, greater prairie-chicken, bobwhite quail, mourning dove, and horned lark.

== Uses ==
The plant can be used as a laxative, but is poisonous if eaten in quantity.
