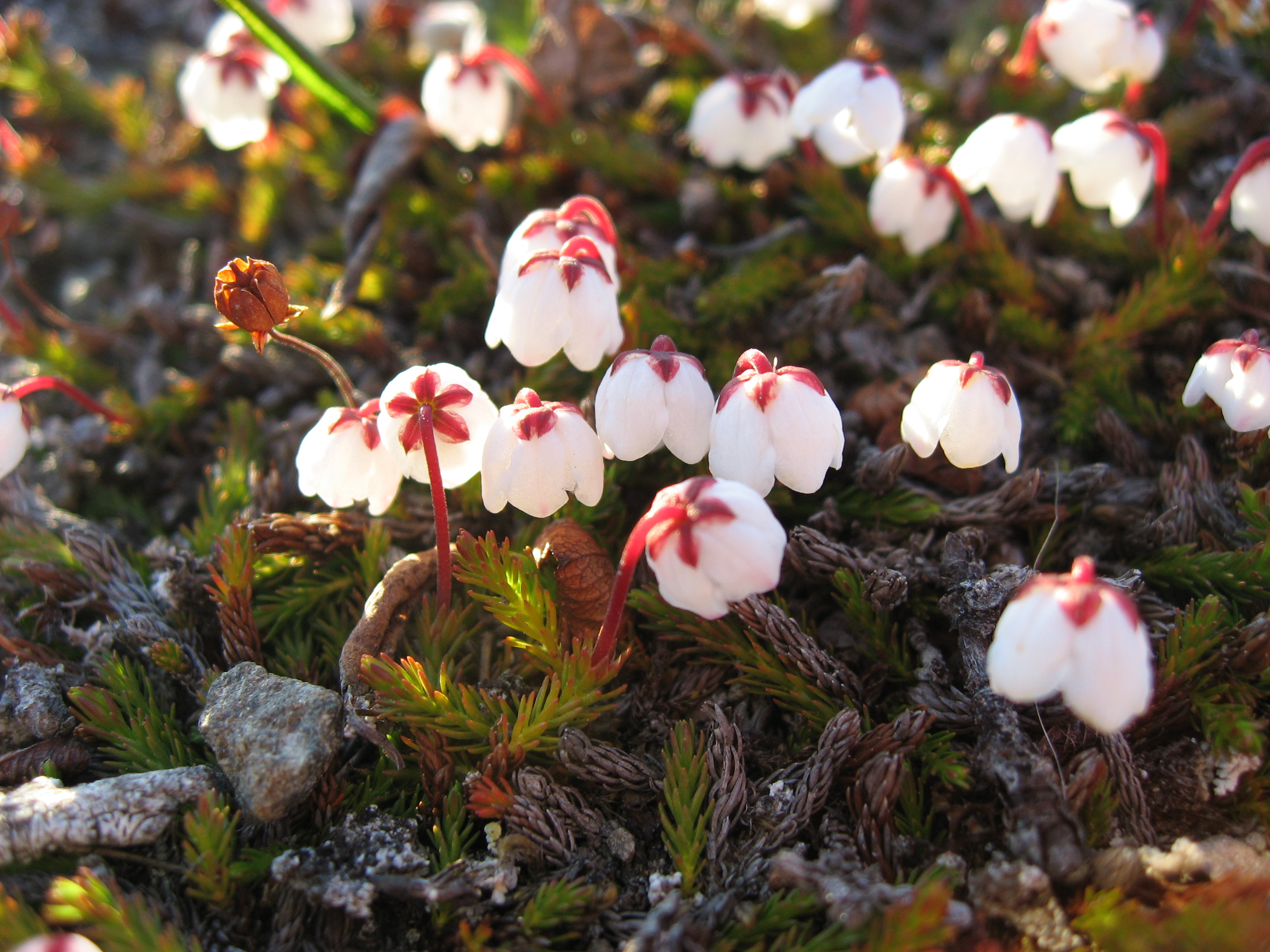

Scientific classification
- Kingdom: Plantae
- Clade: Tracheophytes
- Clade: Angiosperms
- Clade: Eudicots
- Clade: Asterids
- Order: Ericales
- Family: Ericaceae
- Subfamily: Harrimanelloideae; Kron & Judd
- Genus: Harrimanella; Coville
- Species: H. hypnoides

Binomial name
- Harrimanella hypnoides (L.) Coville

Synonyms
- Cassiope hypnoides L.; Andromeda hypnoides L.

= Harrimanella =

Genus of flowering plants in the heather family

Harrimanella is a genus of flowering plant in the heath family Ericaceae, with a single species, Harrimanella hypnoides, also known as moss bell heather or moss heather.

H. hypnoides is a cold hardy dicot perennial that produces moss-like cushions, about 5 centimetres (2 inches) high, often of prostrate stems with ascending shoot tips. The leaves are scale-like, looking like those of a moss. Borne singly on short reddish pedicels, the bell-shaped flowers are conspicuous and white with five fused petals and five sepals. The fruit is an erect capsule.

It was originally named Cassiope hypnoides by Carl Linnaeus in his Flora Lapponica (1737), but Harrimanella hypnoides is now the accepted name at Integrated Taxonomic Information System. The specific epithet hypnoides means 'like Hypnum', a genus of mosses.

It can be found growing on rock crevices in the Canadian arctic, Quebec, the Northeastern United States, Greenland, Iceland, the mountains of Norway, Sweden and Finland, Svalbard and arctic Russia, including the Ural Mountains.
