= Mount Yake =

Active volcano on the island of Honshu, Japan

- 焼岳
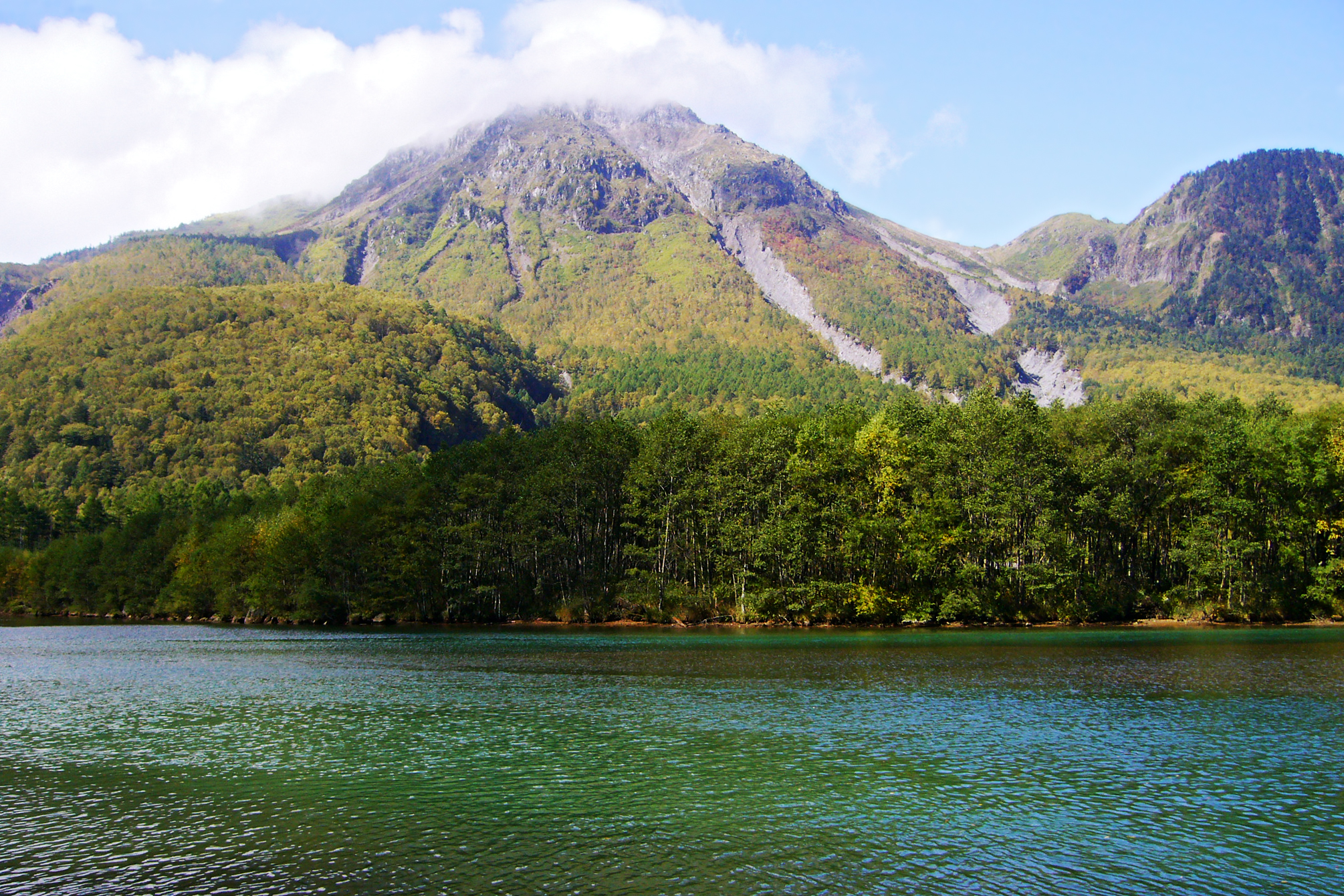
- Mount Yake behind Lake Taishō

Highest point
- Elevation: 2,455 m (8,054 ft)
- Listing: Mountains in Japan; Volcanoes in Japan
- Coordinates: 36°13′37″N 137°35′13″E

Naming
- English translation: Burnt mountain
- Language of name: Japanese

Geography
- Location within Japan
- Country: Japan
- Prefectures: Gifu and Nagano
- Protected area: Chūbu-Sangaku National Park
- Cities: Takayama and Matsumoto
- Parent range: Hida Mountains

Geology
- Rock age: 20,000 years Late Pleistocene
- Mountain type: Active stratovolcano
- Rock type(s): Andesite, Dacite
- Last eruption: February 11, 1995

Climbing
- Easiest route: Hike

Mount Yake (焼岳, Yake-dake) literally, "Burning mountain" is an active volcano in the Hida Mountains, lying between Matsumoto, Nagano Prefecture, and Takayama, Gifu Prefecture, Japan. It is one of the 100 Famous Japanese Mountains, reaching 2,455 m (8,054 ft) at the highest peak.

== Geography ==
Mount Yake is the most active of all the volcanoes in the Hida Mountains. Its two main peaks are the northern and southern peaks, but visitors can only ascend to the northern peak, as the southern peak is currently a restricted area. A crater lake lies between the two peaks.

High viscosity lava flowing from the upper regions of Mount Yake has led to the build up of a lava dome.

The heat from the volcano produces many onsen in the surrounding area.

== Eruptions ==
In 1911, 22 minor eruptions were recorded. In 1915, during the Taishō period, however, there was a major eruption. The flow of the lava blocked the Azusa River, which caused the river to form a lake that was named Lake Taishō. The Azusa River is again flowing today, but the lake still remains.

In 1962, there was an eruption that killed two people staying at a small hut near the mouth of the volcano.

In 1995, a tunnel was being constructed on the Nagano Prefecture side of the mountain, through Mount Akandana, which was thought to be part of Mount Yake. At 2:25pm on February 11, the workers encountered volcanic gases, which were quickly followed by a phreatic eruption on Mount Yake, leading to the death of four people. Later explorations have shown that Mount Akandana is an independent volcano.

There is still an active fumarole near the mountain's peak.

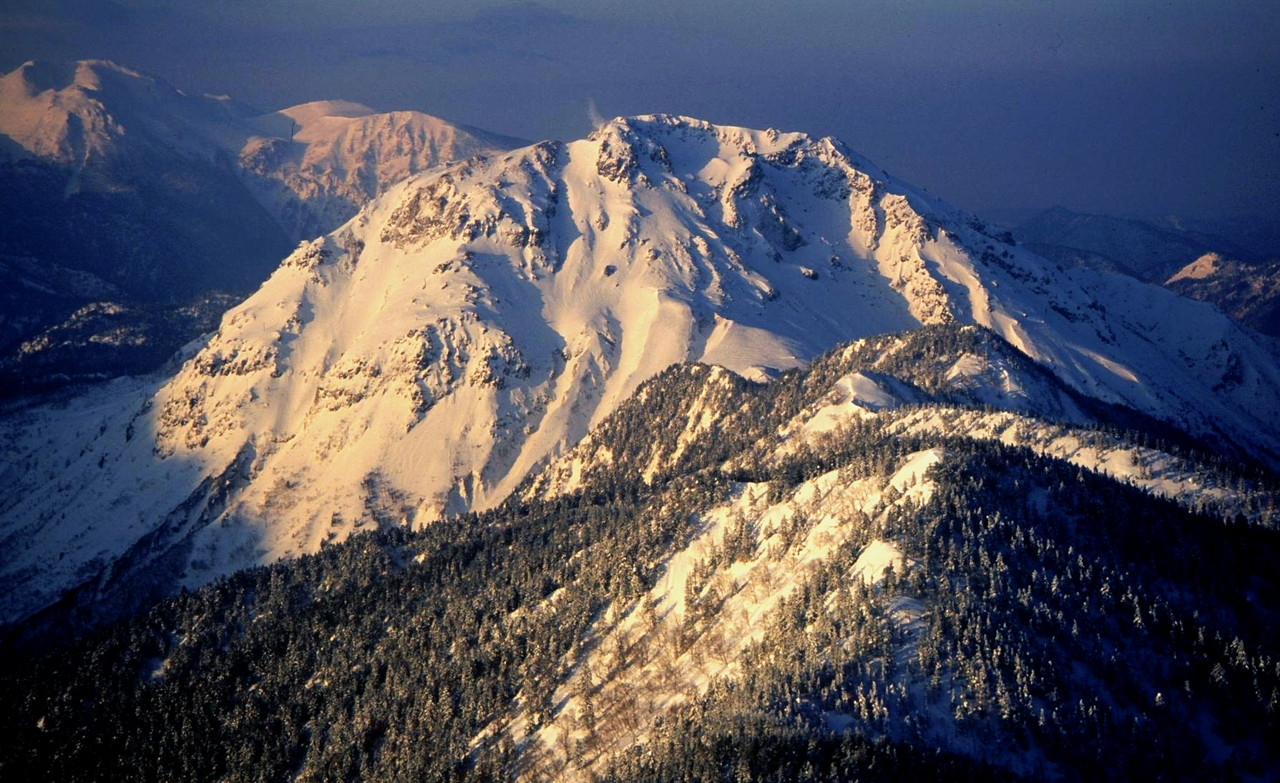
seen from Mount Hotaka

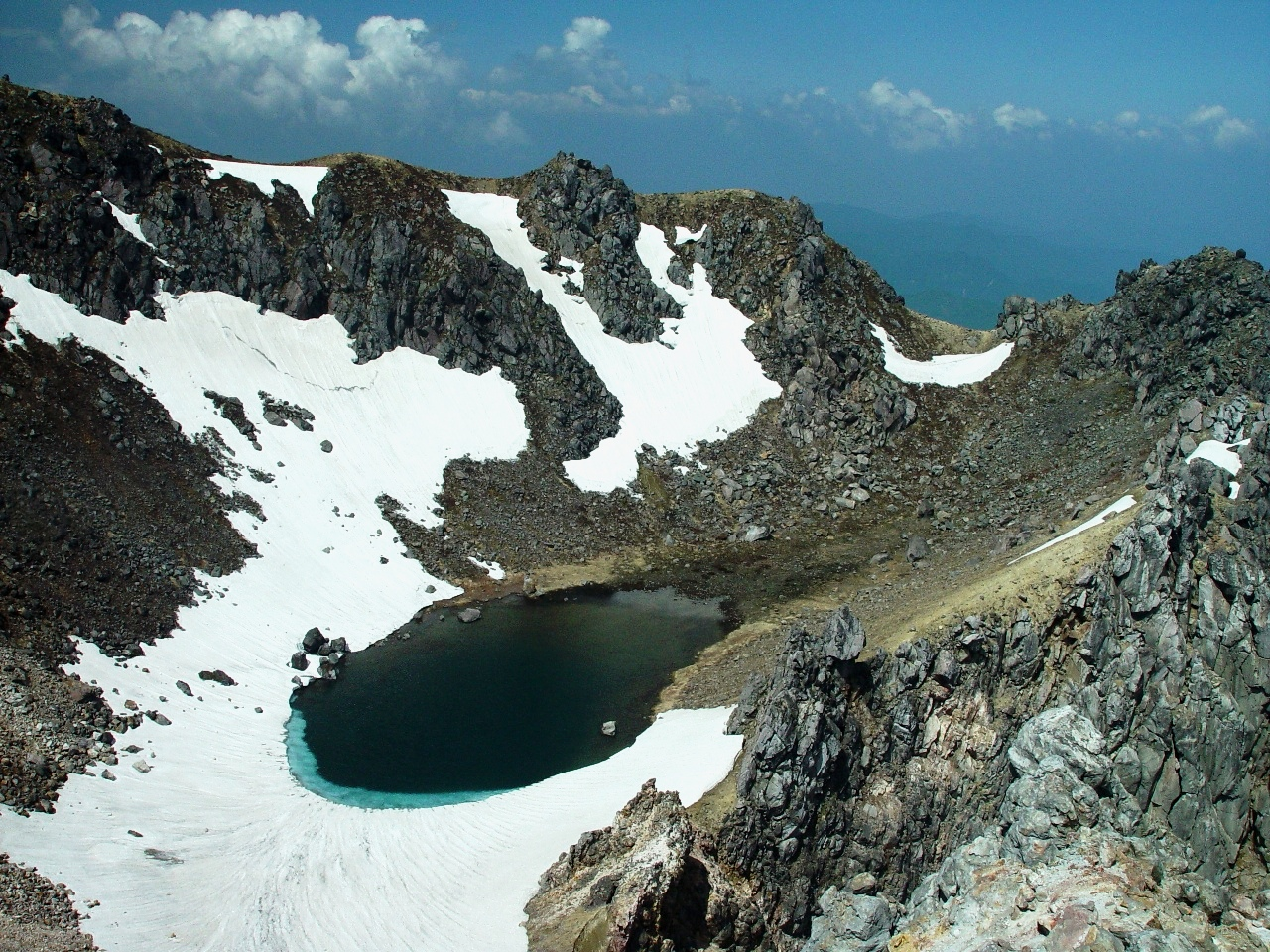
crater lake between the northern and southern peaks

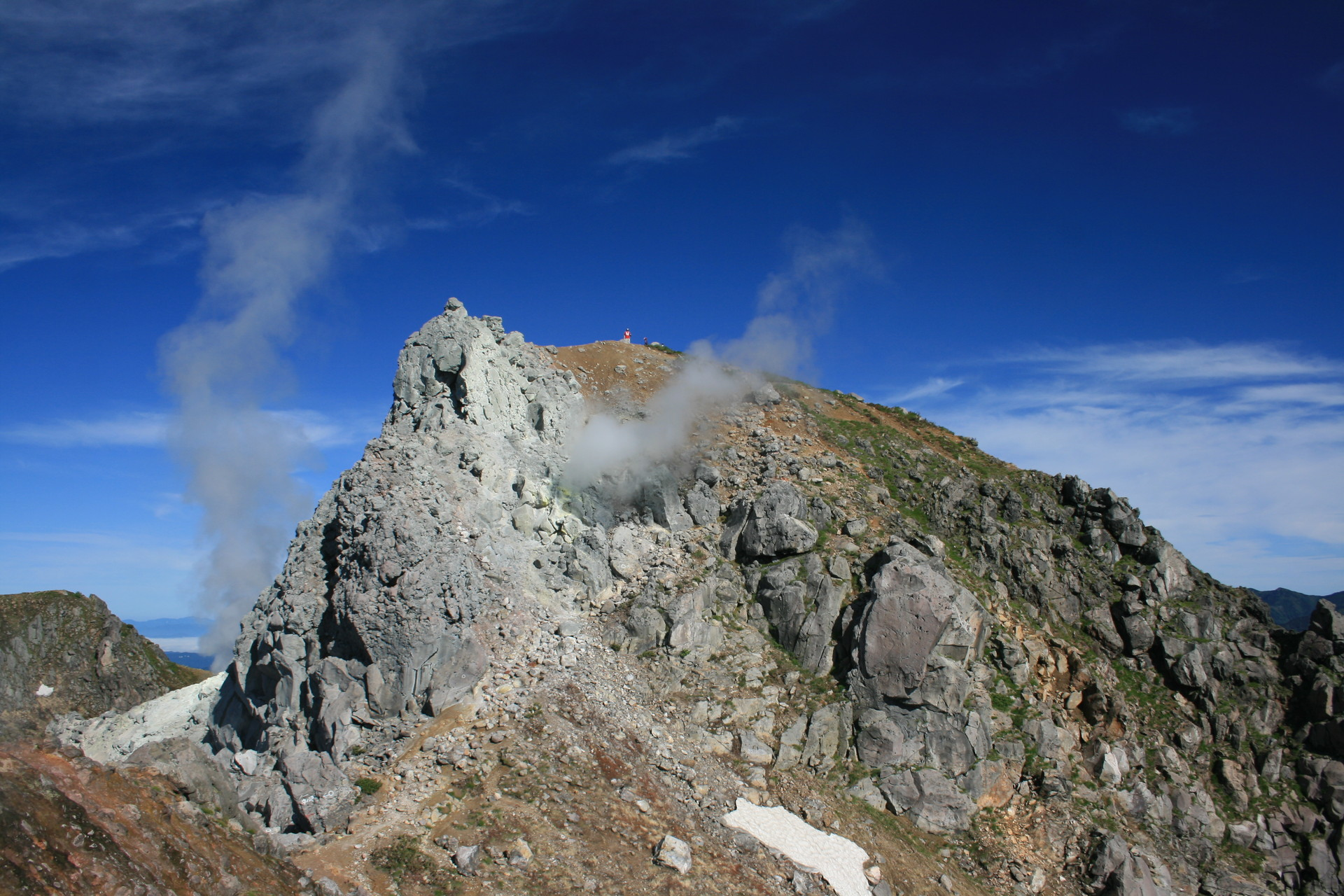
northern peak and volcanic gases

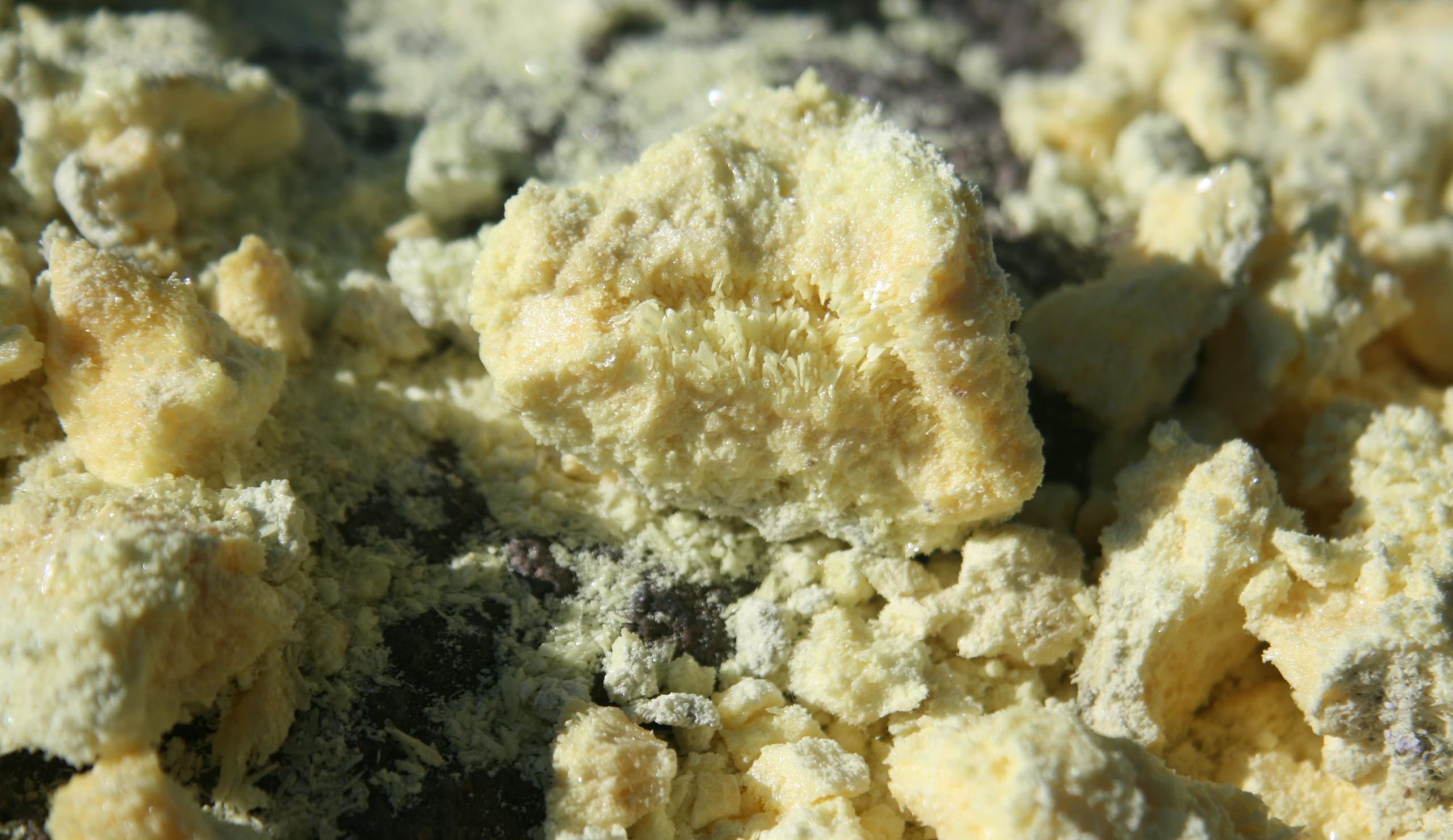
sulfur

== See also ==
- Media related to Mount Yake (Hida Mountains) at Wikimedia Commons
- 100 Famous Japanese Mountains
