= List of Vaccinium species =

The following species in the flowering plant genus Vaccinium, containing the cranberries, blueberries, bilberries (whortleberries), lingonberries (cowberries), and huckleberries, are accepted by Plants of the World Online. This taxon is highly polyphyletic.

- Vaccinium absconditum J.J.Sm.
- Vaccinium acrobracteatum K.Schum.
- Vaccinium acutissimum F.Muell.
- Vaccinium adenochaetum Sleumer
- Vaccinium adenotrichum Sleumer
- Vaccinium agusanense Elmer
- Vaccinium aitapense Sleumer
- Vaccinium alainii Acuña & Roíg
- Vaccinium albicans Sleumer
- Vaccinium albidens H.Lév. & Vaniot
- Vaccinium almedae Wilbur & Luteyn
- Vaccinium altiterrae Veldkamp
- Vaccinium alvarezii Merr.
- Vaccinium amakhangium S.Panda & Sanjappa
- Vaccinium amazonicum Pedraza & Luteyn
- Vaccinium ambivalens Sleumer
- Vaccinium amblyandrum F.Muell.
- Vaccinium amphoterum Sleumer
- Vaccinium amplexicaule J.J.Sm.
- Vaccinium ampullaceum Sleumer
- Vaccinium angiense Kaneh. & Hatus.
- Vaccinium angustifolium Aiton
- Vaccinium apiculatum Sleumer
- Vaccinium apophysatum Sleumer
- Vaccinium appendiculatum Schltr.
- Vaccinium arboreum Marshall
- Vaccinium arbutoides C.B.Clarke
- Vaccinium arctostaphylos L.
- Vaccinium ardisioides Hook.f. ex C.B.Clarke
- Vaccinium aristatum Luteyn & Pedraza
- Vaccinium artum J.J.Sm.
- Vaccinium × atlanticum E.P.Bicknell
- Vaccinium aucupis Sleumer
- Vaccinium auriculifolium Sleumer
- Vaccinium bancanum Miq.
- Vaccinium banksii Merr.
- Vaccinium barandanum S.Vidal
- Vaccinium barbatum J.J.Sm.
- Vaccinium bartlettii Merr.
- Vaccinium beamanianum Wilbur & Luteyn
- Vaccinium benguetense S.Vidal
- Vaccinium besagiense J.J.Sm.
- Vaccinium bissei R.Berazaín
- Vaccinium blepharocalyx Schltr.
- Vaccinium bocatorense Wilbur
- Vaccinium bodenii Wernham
- Vaccinium boninense Nakai
- Vaccinium boreale I.V.Hall & Aalders
- Vaccinium brachyandrum C.Y.Wu & R.C.Fang
- Vaccinium brachybotrys (Franch.) Hand.-Mazz.
- Vaccinium brachycladum Sleumer
- Vaccinium brachygyne J.J.Sm.
- Vaccinium brachytrichum Sleumer
- Vaccinium bracteatum Thunb.
- Vaccinium brassii Sleumer
- Vaccinium breedlovei L.O.Williams
- Vaccinium brevipedicellatum C.Y.Wu
- Vaccinium brevipedunculatum J.J.Sm.
- Vaccinium × brunoense P.W.Fritsch
- Vaccinium bullatum (Dop) Sleumer
- Vaccinium bulleyanum (Diels) Sleumer
- Vaccinium caesariense Mack.
- Vaccinium calycinum Sm.
- Vaccinium camiguinense Merr.
- Vaccinium campanense Wilbur & Luteyn
- Vaccinium candidum Veldkamp
- Vaccinium capillatum Sleumer
- Vaccinium cardiophorum Sleumer
- Vaccinium carlesii Dunn
- Vaccinium carneolum Sleumer
- Vaccinium × carolinianum Ashe
- Vaccinium caudatum Warb.
- Vaccinium cavendishioides Sleumer
- Vaccinium cavinerve C.Y.Wu
- Vaccinium cebuense Salares & Pelser
- Vaccinium centrocelebicum Sleumer
- Vaccinium ceraceum Argent
- Vaccinium ceramense Sleumer
- Vaccinium cercidifolium J.J.Sm.
- Vaccinium cereum (L.f.) G.Forst.
- Vaccinium cespitosum Michx.
- Vaccinium chaetothrix Sleumer
- Vaccinium chamaebuxus C.Y.Wu
- Vaccinium chengiae W.P.Fang
- Vaccinium chihuahuense Wilbur & Luteyn
- Vaccinium chimantense Maguire, Steyerm. & Luteyn
- Vaccinium chlaenophyllum Vuong, V.H.Bui & V.S.Dang
- Vaccinium chunii Merr. ex Sleumer
- Vaccinium ciliatum Thunb.
- Vaccinium claoxylon J.J.Sm.
- Vaccinium clementis Merr.
- Vaccinium coarctatum M.N.Tamayo & Fernando
- Vaccinium coelorum Wernham
- Vaccinium commutatum Mabb. & Sleumer
- Vaccinium conchophyllum Rehder
- Vaccinium confertum Kunth
- Vaccinium consanguineum Klotzsch
- Vaccinium continuum Luteyn & Pedraza
- Vaccinium contractum Sleumer
- Vaccinium convallariiflorum J.J.Sm.
- Vaccinium convexifolium J.J.Sm.
- Vaccinium cordifolium (M.Martens & Galeotti) Hemsl.
- Vaccinium coriaceum Hook.f.
- Vaccinium cornigerum Sleumer
- Vaccinium corymbodendron Dunal
- Vaccinium corymbosum L.
- Vaccinium costaricense Wilbur & Luteyn
- Vaccinium costerifolium Sleumer
- Vaccinium craspedotum Sleumer
- Vaccinium crassiflorum J.J.Sm.
- Vaccinium crassifolium Andrews
- Vaccinium crassistylum Sleumer
- Vaccinium crassivenium Sleumer
- Vaccinium crenatifolium Sleumer
- Vaccinium crenatum (G.Don) Sleumer
- Vaccinium crinigerum Kloet
- Vaccinium cruentum Sleumer
- Vaccinium cubense Griseb.
- Vaccinium culminicola Wernham
- Vaccinium cumingianum S.Vidal
- Vaccinium cuneifolium (Blume) Miq.
- Vaccinium cuspidifolium C.Y.Wu & R.C.Fang
- Vaccinium cyclopense J.J.Sm.
- Vaccinium cylindraceum Sm.
- Vaccinium damingshanense Y.H.Tong & N.H.Xia
- Vaccinium daphniphyllum Schltr.
- Vaccinium darrowii Camp
- Vaccinium debilescens Sleumer
- Vaccinium decumbens J.J.Sm.
- Vaccinium delavayi Franch.
- Vaccinium deliciosum Piper
- Vaccinium dendrocharis Hand.-Mazz.
- Vaccinium densifolium J.J.Sm.
- Vaccinium dentatum Sm.
- Vaccinium dependens (G.Don) Sleumer
- Vaccinium dialypetalum J.J.Sm.
- Vaccinium dictyoneuron Sleumer
- Vaccinium didymanthum Dunal
- Vaccinium distichum Luteyn
- Vaccinium × dobbinii Burnham
- Vaccinium dominans Sleumer
- Vaccinium dubiosum J.J.Sm.
- Vaccinium duclouxii (H.Lév.) Hand.-Mazz.
- Vaccinium dunalianum Wight
- Vaccinium dunnianum Sleumer
- Vaccinium ekmanii R.Berazaín
- Vaccinium elegans Elmer
- Vaccinium elliptifolium Merr.
- Vaccinium elvirae Luteyn
- Vaccinium emarginatum Hayata
- Vaccinium empetrum Aver. & K.S.Nguyen
- Vaccinium endertii J.J.Sm.
- Vaccinium epiphyticum Merr.
- Vaccinium erythrocarpum Michx.
- Vaccinium euryanthum A.C.Sm.
- Vaccinium evanidinervium Sleumer
- Vaccinium exaristatum Kurz
- Vaccinium exiguum M.N.Tamayo, R.Bustam. & P.W.Fritsch
- Vaccinium exul Bolus
- Vaccinium eymae Sleumer
- Vaccinium filipes Schltr.
- Vaccinium fimbribracteatum C.Y.Wu
- Vaccinium fimbricalyx Chun & W.P.Fang
- Vaccinium finisterrae Schltr.
- Vaccinium floccosum (L.O.Williams) Wilbur & Luteyn
- Vaccinium floribundum Kunth
- Vaccinium foetidissiumum H.Lév. & Vaniot
- Vaccinium fragile Franch.
- Vaccinium fraternum Sleumer
- Vaccinium furfuraceum Wilbur & Luteyn
- Vaccinium gaultheriifolium (Griff.) Hook.f. ex C.B.Clarke
- Vaccinium geminiflorum Kunth
- Vaccinium gitingense Elmer
- Vaccinium gjellerupii J.J.Sm.
- Vaccinium glabrescens King & Gamble
- Vaccinium glandellatum Sleumer
- Vaccinium glaucoalbum Hook.f. ex C.B.Clarke
- Vaccinium glaucophyllum C.Y.Wu & R.C.Fang
- Vaccinium globosum J.J.Sm.
- Vaccinium goodenoughii Sleumer
- Vaccinium gracile J.J.Sm.
- Vaccinium gracilipes Sleumer
- Vaccinium gracillimum J.J.Sm.
- Vaccinium grandibracteatum Schltr.
- Vaccinium griffithianum Wight
- Vaccinium guangdongense W.P.Fang & Z.H.Pan
- Vaccinium habbemae Koord.
- Vaccinium haematinum Standl. & Steyerm.
- Vaccinium haematochroum Sleumer
- Vaccinium × hagerupii (Á.Löve & D.Löve) Rothm.
- Vaccinium hainanense Sleumer
- Vaccinium haitangense Sleumer
- Vaccinium halconense Merr.
- Vaccinium hamiguitanense P.W.Fritsch
- Vaccinium hansmeyeri Argent
- Vaccinium hatamense Becc.
- Vaccinium hellwigianum Sleumer
- Vaccinium henryi Hemsl.
- Vaccinium hiepii Kloet
- Vaccinium hirsutum Buckley
- Vaccinium hirtum Thunb.
- Vaccinium hispidulissimum Wernham
- Vaccinium hooglandii Sleumer
- Vaccinium hopei Argent
- Vaccinium horizontale Sleumer
- Vaccinium × hybridum (Avrorin) Czerep.
- Vaccinium igneum J.J.Sm.
- Vaccinium imbricans J.J.Sm.
- Vaccinium impressinerve C.Y.Wu
- Vaccinium inconspicuum J.J.Sm.
- Vaccinium indutum S.Vidal
- Vaccinium insigne (Koord.) J.J.Sm.
- Vaccinium × intermedium Ruthe
- Vaccinium iragaense Merr.
- Vaccinium iteophyllum Hance
- Vaccinium jacobeanum P.F.Stevens
- Vaccinium jagorii Warb.
- Vaccinium japonicum Miq.
- Vaccinium jefense Luteyn & Wilbur
- Vaccinium jevidalianum Smitinand & P.H.Hô
- Vaccinium kachinense Brandis
- Vaccinium kengii C.E.Chang
- Vaccinium kingdon-wardii Sleumer
- Vaccinium kjellhergii J.J.Sm.
- Vaccinium korinchense Ridl.
- Vaccinium korthalsii Miq.
- Vaccinium kostermansii Sleumer
- Vaccinium kunthianum Klotzsch
- Vaccinium lageniforme J.J.Sm.
- Vaccinium lamellatum P.F.Stevens
- Vaccinium lamprophyllum C.Y.Wu & R.C.Fang
- Vaccinium lanigerum Sleumer
- Vaccinium latifolium (Griseb.) Benth. & Hook.f. ex B.D.Jacks.
- Vaccinium latissimum J.J.Sm.
- Vaccinium laurifolium (Blume) Miq.
- Vaccinium leonis Acuña & Roíg
- Vaccinium leptocladum Sleumer
- Vaccinium leptomorphum Sleumer
- Vaccinium leptospermoides J.J.Sm.
- Vaccinium leucanthum Schltdl.
- Vaccinium leucobotrys (Nutt. ex Hook.) G.Nicholson
- Vaccinium ligustrifolium J.J.Sm.
- Vaccinium littoreum Miq.
- Vaccinium longepedicellatum Sleumer
- Vaccinium longicaudatum Chun ex W.P.Fang & Z.H.Pan
- Vaccinium longiporum Schltr.
- Vaccinium longisepalum J.J.Sm.
- Vaccinium loranthifolium Ridl.
- Vaccinium lorentzii Koord.
- Vaccinium lucidum (Blume) Miq.
- Vaccinium lundellianum L.O.Williams
- Vaccinium luteynii Wilbur
- Vaccinium luzoniense S.Vidal
- Vaccinium macgillivrayi Seem.
- Vaccinium macrocarpon Aiton
- Vaccinium madagascariense (Thouars ex Poir.) Sleumer
- Vaccinium malacothrix Sleumer
- Vaccinium mandarinorum Diels
- Vaccinium manipurense (Watt ex Brandis) Sleumer
- Vaccinium × marianum P.Watson
- Vaccinium mathewsii Sleumer
- Vaccinium megalophyes Sleumer
- Vaccinium membranaceum Douglas ex Torr.
- Vaccinium meridionale Sw.
- Vaccinium microcarpum (Turcz. ex Rupr.) Schmalh.
- Vaccinium microphyllum Reinw. ex Blume
- Vaccinium minusculum Sleumer
- Vaccinium minuticalcaratum J.J.Sm.
- Vaccinium miquelii Boerl.
- Vaccinium mjoebergii J.J.Sm.
- Vaccinium modestum W.W.Sm.
- Vaccinium molle J.J.Sm.
- Vaccinium monetarium Sleumer
- Vaccinium monteverdense Wilbur & Luteyn
- Vaccinium montis-ericae Sleumer
- Vaccinium morobense Kloet
- Vaccinium motuoense Y.H.Tong & Y.J.Guo
- Vaccinium moupinense Franch.
- Vaccinium muriculatum J.J.Sm.
- Vaccinium myodianum S.Panda & Sanjappa
- Vaccinium myrsinites Lam.
- Vaccinium myrsinoides Schltr.
- Vaccinium myrtilloides Michx.
- Vaccinium myrtillus L.
- Vaccinium myrtoides (Blume) Miq.
- Vaccinium nagamasu Argent
- Vaccinium napoense Y.H.Tong & N.H.Xia
- Vaccinium neilgherrense Wight
- Vaccinium nhatrangense Dop
- Vaccinium nitens Sleumer
- Vaccinium × nubigenum Fernald
- Vaccinium nummularia Hook.f. & Thomson ex C.B.Clarke
- Vaccinium nuttallii (C.B.Clarke) Sleumer
- Vaccinium obatapaquiniorum Takeuchi
- Vaccinium obedii Veldkamp
- Vaccinium oldhamii Miq.
- Vaccinium omeiense W.P.Fang
- Vaccinium onimense Argent
- Vaccinium oranjense J.J.Sm.
- Vaccinium oreites Sleumer
- Vaccinium oreogenes W.W.Sm.
- Vaccinium oreomyrtus Sleumer
- Vaccinium orosiense Wilbur & Luteyn
- Vaccinium ortizii Luteyn & Pedraza
- Vaccinium oscarlopezianum Co
- Vaccinium otophyllum Sleumer
- Vaccinium ovalifolium Sm.
- Vaccinium ovatum Pursh
- Vaccinium oxycoccos L.
- Vaccinium pachydermum Stapf
- Vaccinium paddywoodsii Argent
- Vaccinium padifolium Sm.
- Vaccinium palawanense Merr.
- Vaccinium pallidum Aiton
- Vaccinium papillatum P.F.Stevens
- Vaccinium papulosum C.Y.Wu & R.C.Fang
- Vaccinium paradisearum Becc.
- Vaccinium parvifolium Sm.
- Vaccinium parvulifolium F.Muell.
- Vaccinium paucicrenatum Sleumer
- Vaccinium perrigidum Elmer
- Vaccinium petelotii Merr.
- Vaccinium philippinense Warb.
- Vaccinium phillippsiae Argent
- Vaccinium phillyreoides Sleumer
- Vaccinium piceifolium Wernham
- Vaccinium piliferum (Hook.f. ex C.B.Clarke) Sleumer
- Vaccinium pilosilobum J.J.Sm.
- Vaccinium pipolyi Luteyn
- Vaccinium platyphyllum Merr.
- Vaccinium poasanum Donn.Sm.
- Vaccinium podocarpoideum W.P.Fang & Z.H.Pan
- Vaccinium praeces P.F.Stevens
- Vaccinium praestans Lamb.
- Vaccinium pratense P.C.Tam ex C.Y.Wu & R.C.Fang
- Vaccinium prostratum Sleumer
- Vaccinium psammogenes Sleumer
- Vaccinium pseudobullatum W.P.Fang & Z.H.Pan
- Vaccinium pseudocaracasanum Sleumer
- Vaccinium pseudocaudatum Sleumer
- Vaccinium pseudodialypetalum Ng
- Vaccinium pseudorobustum Sleumer
- Vaccinium pseudospadiceum Dop
- Vaccinium pseudotonkinense Sleumer
- Vaccinium pterocalyx Luteyn
- Vaccinium puberulum Klotzsch ex Meisn.
- Vaccinium pubicalyx Franch.
- Vaccinium pugionifolium Sleumer
- Vaccinium pullei J.J.Sm.
- Vaccinium pumilum Kurz
- Vaccinium quinquefidum J.J.Sm.
- Vaccinium racemosum (Vahl) Wilbur & Luteyn
- Vaccinium randaiense Hayata
- Vaccinium rapae Skottsb.
- Vaccinium reticulatovenosum Sleumer
- Vaccinium reticulatum Sm.
- Vaccinium retivenium Sleumer
- Vaccinium retusifolium J.J.Sm.
- Vaccinium retusum (Griff.) Hook.f. ex C.B.Clarke
- Vaccinium rigidifolium Sleumer
- Vaccinium roraimense N.E.Br.
- Vaccinium roseiflorum J.J.Sm.
- Vaccinium rubescens R.C.Fang
- Vaccinium rubroviolaceum Sleumer
- Vaccinium sandsii Argent
- Vaccinium sanguineum Schltr.
- Vaccinium santafeense Wilbur & Luteyn
- Vaccinium sarawakense Merr.
- Vaccinium saxatile Luteyn & Pedraza
- Vaccinium saxicola Chun
- Vaccinium scandens Schltr.
- Vaccinium schlechterianum Sleumer
- Vaccinium schoddei Sleumer
- Vaccinium schultzei Schltr.
- Vaccinium sciaphilum C.Y.Wu
- Vaccinium sclerophyllum Sleumer
- Vaccinium scoparium Leiberg ex Coville
- Vaccinium scopulorum W.W.Sm.
- Vaccinium scortechinii King & Gamble
- Vaccinium scyphocalyx Sleumer
- Vaccinium secundum Klotzsch
- Vaccinium selerianum (Loes.) Sleumer
- Vaccinium serrulatum W.P.Fang & Z.H.Pan
- Vaccinium setipes Airy Shaw
- Vaccinium shaferi Acuña & Roíg
- Vaccinium shastense J.K.Nelson & Lindstrand
- Vaccinium shikokianum Nakai
- Vaccinium sieboldii Miq.
- Vaccinium sikkimense C.B.Clarke
- Vaccinium simulans Sleumer
- Vaccinium singularis N.R.Salinas & Betancur
- Vaccinium sinicum Sleumer
- Vaccinium smallii A.Gray
- Vaccinium sororium J.J.Sm.
- Vaccinium spaniotrichum Sleumer
- Vaccinium sparsicapillum Sleumer
- Vaccinium sparsum Sleumer
- Vaccinium sphyrospennoides Sleumer
- Vaccinium spiculatum C.Y.Wu & R.C.Fang
- Vaccinium sprengelii (G.Don) Sleumer ex Rehder
- Vaccinium stamineum L.
- Vaccinium stanleyi Schweinf.
- Vaccinium steinii Sleumer
- Vaccinium stellae-montis Sleumer
- Vaccinium stenanthum Sleumer
- Vaccinium stenolobum Schltr.
- Vaccinium stenophyllum Steud.
- Vaccinium steyermarkii Luteyn
- Vaccinium striicaule Sleumer
- Vaccinium subdissitifolium P.F.Stevens
- Vaccinium subfalcatum Merr. ex Sleumer
- Vaccinium subulisepalum J.J.Sm.
- Vaccinium sumatranum Jack
- Vaccinium summifaucis Sleumer
- Vaccinium supracostatum Hand.-Mazz.
- Vaccinium sylvaticum Elmer
- Vaccinium symplocifolium (D.Don ex G.Don) Alston
- Vaccinium talamancense (Wilbur & Luteyn) Luteyn
- Vaccinium tanjungii Argent
- Vaccinium taxifolium Sleumer
- Vaccinium tectiflorum Danet
- Vaccinium tenellum Aiton
- Vaccinium tentaculatum J.J.Sm.
- Vaccinium tenuiflorum R.C.Fang
- Vaccinium tenuipes Merr.
- Vaccinium thibaudifolium Wernham
- Vaccinium timonioides Wernham
- Vaccinium timorense Fawc.
- Vaccinium tomicipes J.J.Sm.
- Vaccinium tonkinense Dop
- Vaccinium trichocarpum Sleumer
- Vaccinium trichocladum Merr. & F.P.Metcalf
- Vaccinium triflorum Rehder
- Vaccinium truncatocalyx Chun
- Vaccinium tubiflorum J.J.Sm.
- Vaccinium turfosum Sleumer
- Vaccinium uliginosum L.
- Vaccinium urceolatum Hemsl.
- Vaccinium urquiolae Berazaín
- Vaccinium urubambense Luteyn & Pedraza
- Vaccinium utteridgei Argent
- Vaccinium vacciniaceum (Roxb.) Sleumer
- Vaccinium varingiifolium (Blume) Miq.
- Vaccinium venosum Wight
- Vaccinium versteegii Koord.
- Vaccinium vidalii Merr. & Rolfe
- Vaccinium vietnamense Smitinand & P.H.Hô
- Vaccinium villosiflorum J.J.Sm.
- Vaccinium viridiflorum J.J.Sm.
- Vaccinium viscifolium King & Gamble
- Vaccinium vitis-idaea L.
- Vaccinium vonroemeri Koord.
- Vaccinium warburgii Sleumer
- Vaccinium whiteanum Sleumer
- Vaccinium whitfordii Merr.
- Vaccinium whitmeei F.Muell.
- Vaccinium whitmorei Ng
- Vaccinium wilburii Almeda & Breedlove
- Vaccinium wisselianum Sleumer
- Vaccinium wollastonii Wernham
- Vaccinium wondiwoiense J.J.Sm.
- Vaccinium woodianum H.F.Copel.
- Vaccinium wrightii A.Gray
- Vaccinium xerampelinum Sleumer
- Vaccinium yakushimense Makino
- Vaccinium yaoshanicum Sleumer
- Vaccinium yatabei Makino
- Vaccinium youngii Pedraza & Luteyn
