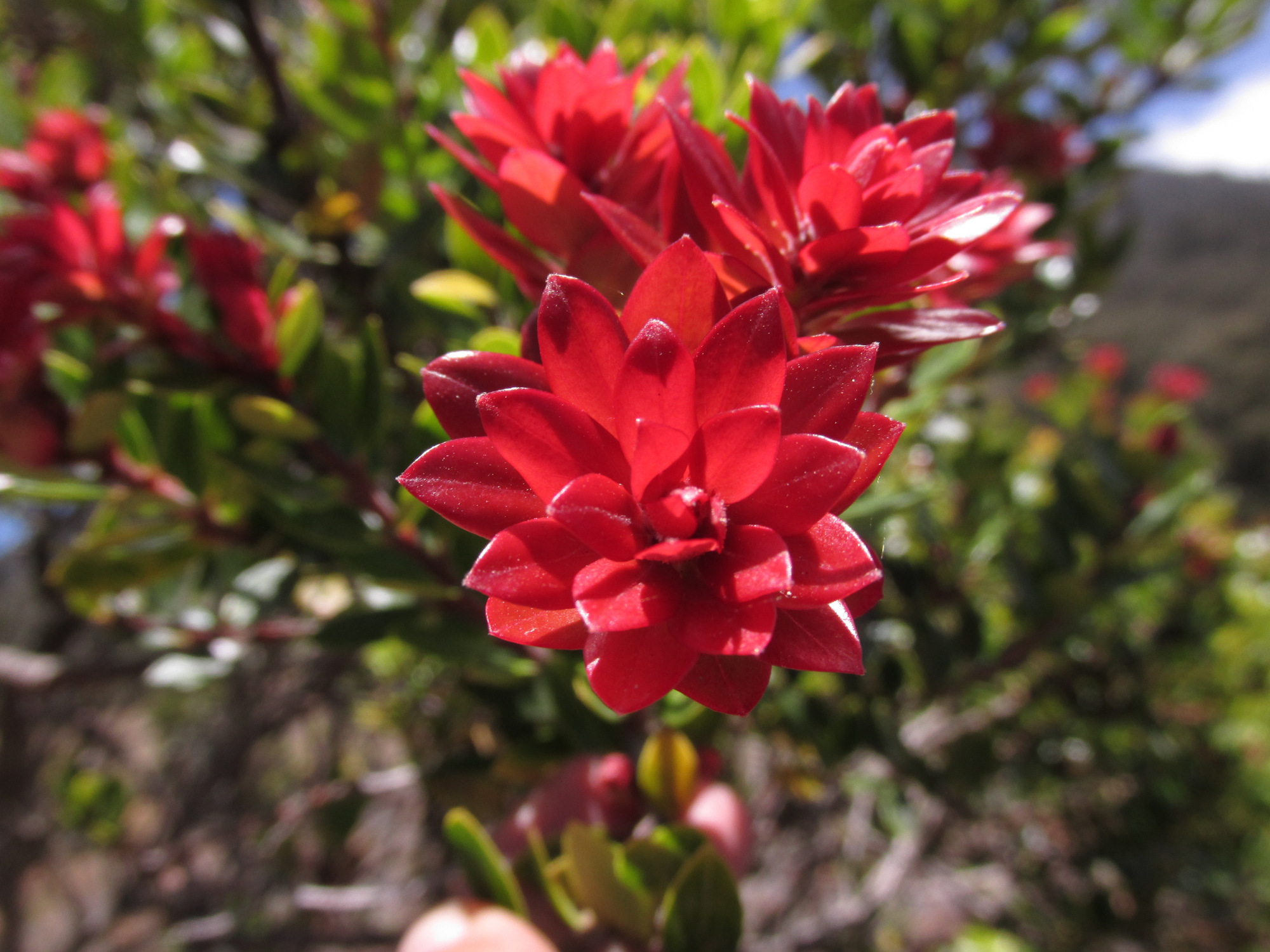

Scientific classification
- Kingdom: Plantae
- Clade: Tracheophytes
- Clade: Angiosperms
- Clade: Eudicots
- Clade: Asterids
- Order: Ericales
- Family: Ericaceae
- Genus: Vaccinium
- Species: V. varingiifolium

Binomial name
- Vaccinium varingiifolium (Blume) Miq.

Synonyms
- Agapetes varingiifolia (Blume) G.Don 1832; Epigynium varingiifolium (Blume) Klotzsch 1852; Thibaudia varingiifolia Blume 1826

= Vaccinium varingifolium =

Species of fruit and plant

Vaccinium varingiifolium is a species of Vaccinium native to Peninsular Malaysia and Indonesia.
