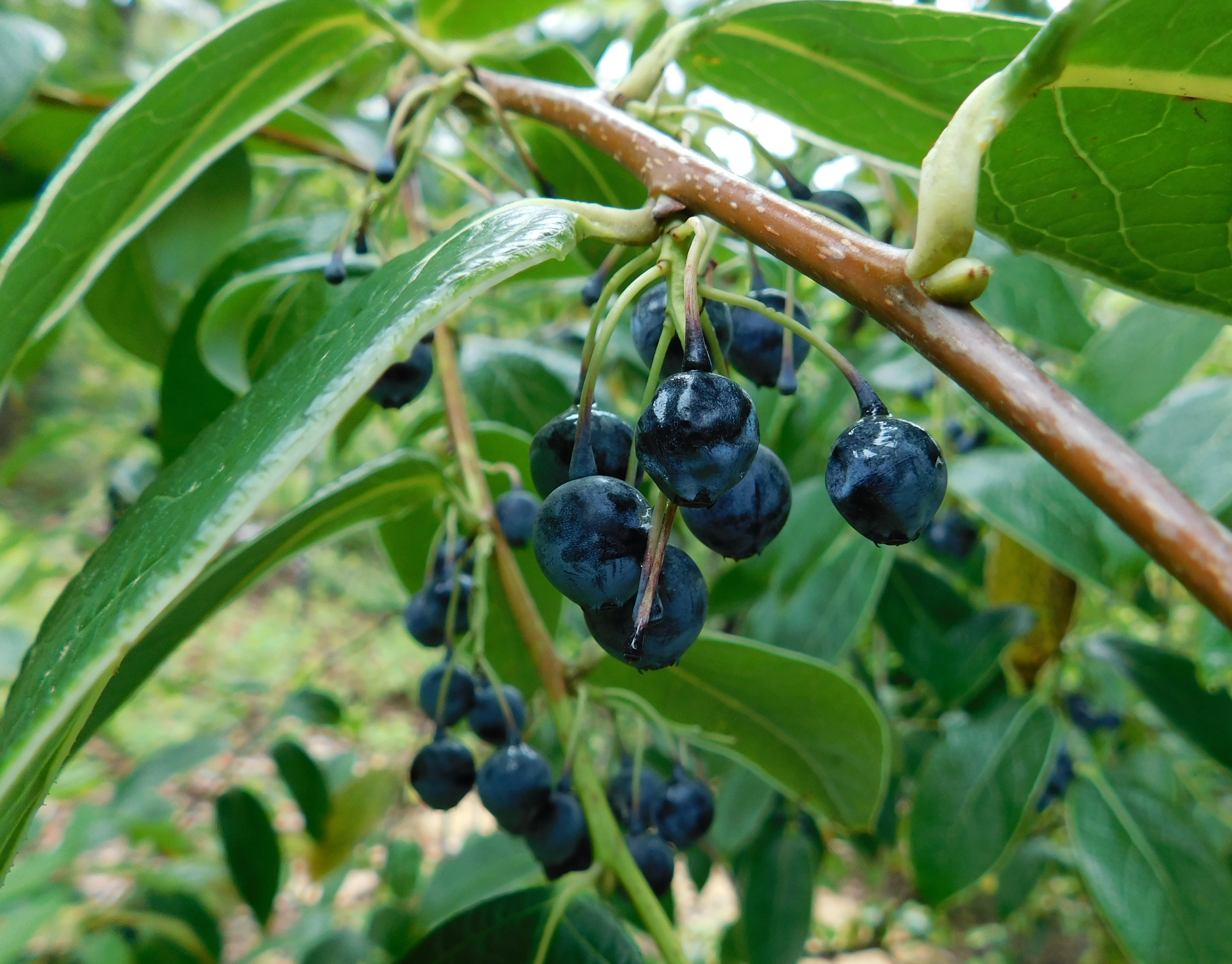

Scientific classification
- Kingdom: Plantae
- Clade: Embryophytes
- Clade: Tracheophytes
- Clade: Spermatophytes
- Clade: Angiosperms
- Clade: Eudicots
- Clade: Asterids
- Order: Ericales
- Family: Ericaceae
- Genus: Vaccinium
- Species: V. gaultheriifolium

Binomial name
- Vaccinium gaultheriifolium (Griff.) Hook.f. ex C.B.Clarke

Synonyms
- Thibaudia gaultheriifolia Griff. 1854; Vaccinium diaphanoloma Hand.-Mazz. 1925

= Vaccinium gaultheriifolium =

Species of fruit and plant

Vaccinium gaultheriifolium is an Asian species of Vaccinium.

== Description ==
Vaccinium gaultheriifolium is an evergreen shrub, reaching 2–4 metres (6 1/2–13 feet) in height and sometimes growing as an epiphyte. Its stems are smooth, bearing scattered elliptic leaves that are leathery and measure 7–13 centimetres (3–5 inches) long and 4–6.5 cm (1 1/2–2 1/2 in) wide, with 5–8 pairs of secondary veins. The petioles are 4–6 millimetres (1/8–1/4 in) long.

The inflorescences are 2–3.5 cm (3/4–1 1/2 in) long and hairless, with 8–13 flowers and deciduous elliptic bracts measuring 1.2 cm. The flower tube is smooth and glaucous, with a calyx limb of 0.7–1 mm that is triangular-toothed almost to the base. The corolla is pink or red, measuring 6–11 mm (1/4–3/8 in). The berries are dark purple and 8–9 mm (5/16–3/8 in) in diameter.

== Distribution and habitat ==
The species is native to China, Nepal, Sikkim, India and Myanmar.
