= Vaccinium adenochaetum =

Scientific classification
- Kingdom: Plantae
- Clade: Tracheophytes
- Clade: Angiosperms
- Clade: Eudicots
- Clade: Asterids
- Order: Ericales
- Family: Ericaceae
- Genus: Vaccinium
- Species: V. adenochaetum

Binomial name
- Vaccinium adenochaetum Sleumer

Species of plant

Vaccinium adenochaetum is a species of plant in the family Ericaceae found in northern Myanmar. A specimen was collected in 1926 by British botanist Frank Kingdon Ward in the valley of the Nam Tamai, and the species was described in 1941 by Hermann Otto Sleumer.
