= Vaccinium whitmorei =

Conservation status
- Endangered (IUCN 2.3)

Scientific classification
- Kingdom: Plantae
- Clade: Tracheophytes
- Clade: Angiosperms
- Clade: Eudicots
- Clade: Asterids
- Order: Ericales
- Family: Ericaceae
- Genus: Vaccinium
- Species: V. whitmorei

Binomial name
- Vaccinium whitmorei Ng

Species of flowering plant

Vaccinium whitmorei is a species of plant in the family Ericaceae. It is endemic to Peninsular Malaysia. It is threatened by habitat loss.
