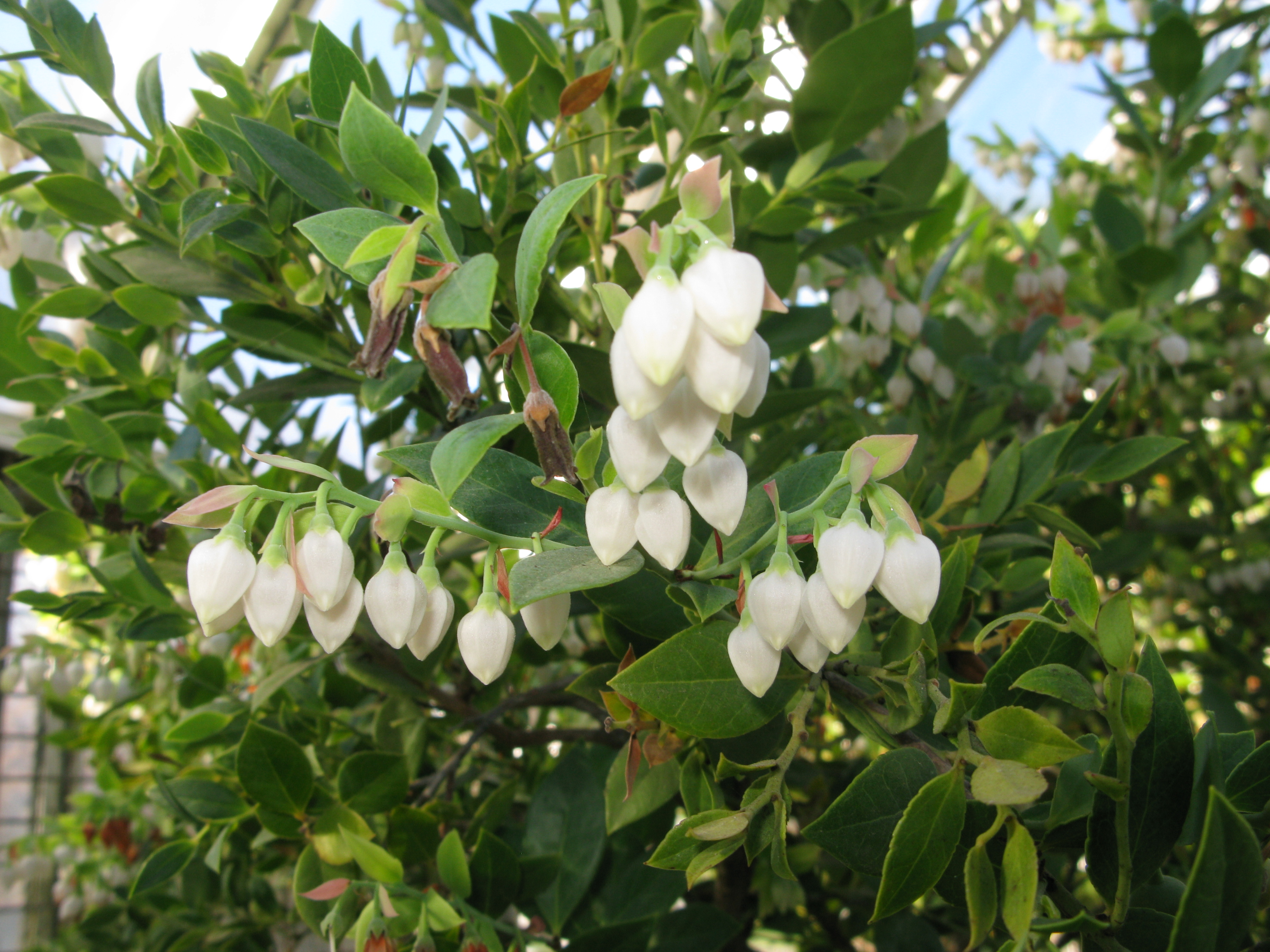

Scientific classification
- Kingdom: Plantae
- Clade: Embryophytes
- Clade: Tracheophytes
- Clade: Spermatophytes
- Clade: Angiosperms
- Clade: Eudicots
- Clade: Asterids
- Order: Ericales
- Family: Ericaceae
- Genus: Vaccinium
- Species: V. boninense

Binomial name
- Vaccinium boninense Nakai

= Vaccinium boninense =

Species of plant

Vaccinium boninense (ムニンシャシャンボ, Munin-shashanbo) is a Japanese species of flowering plant in the family Ericaceae.

== Taxonomy ==
The species was first described by Japanese botanist Takenoshin Nakai in 1926. The specific epithet relates to the type locality in the Bonin (or Munin) Islands.

== Description ==
Vaccinium boninense is an evergreen shrub that grows to a height of approximately 1 metre (3 1/2 feet). After flowering, from January to April, it produces small spherical fruits 6 millimetres (1/4 inch) in diameter that turn black as they ripen.

== Distribution and habitat ==
The species is endemic to the Bonin Islands.

== Conservation ==
Vaccinium boninense is classified as Vulnerable on the Ministry of the Environment Red List.

== See also ==
- Ogasawara subtropical moist forests
- Ogasawara National Park
