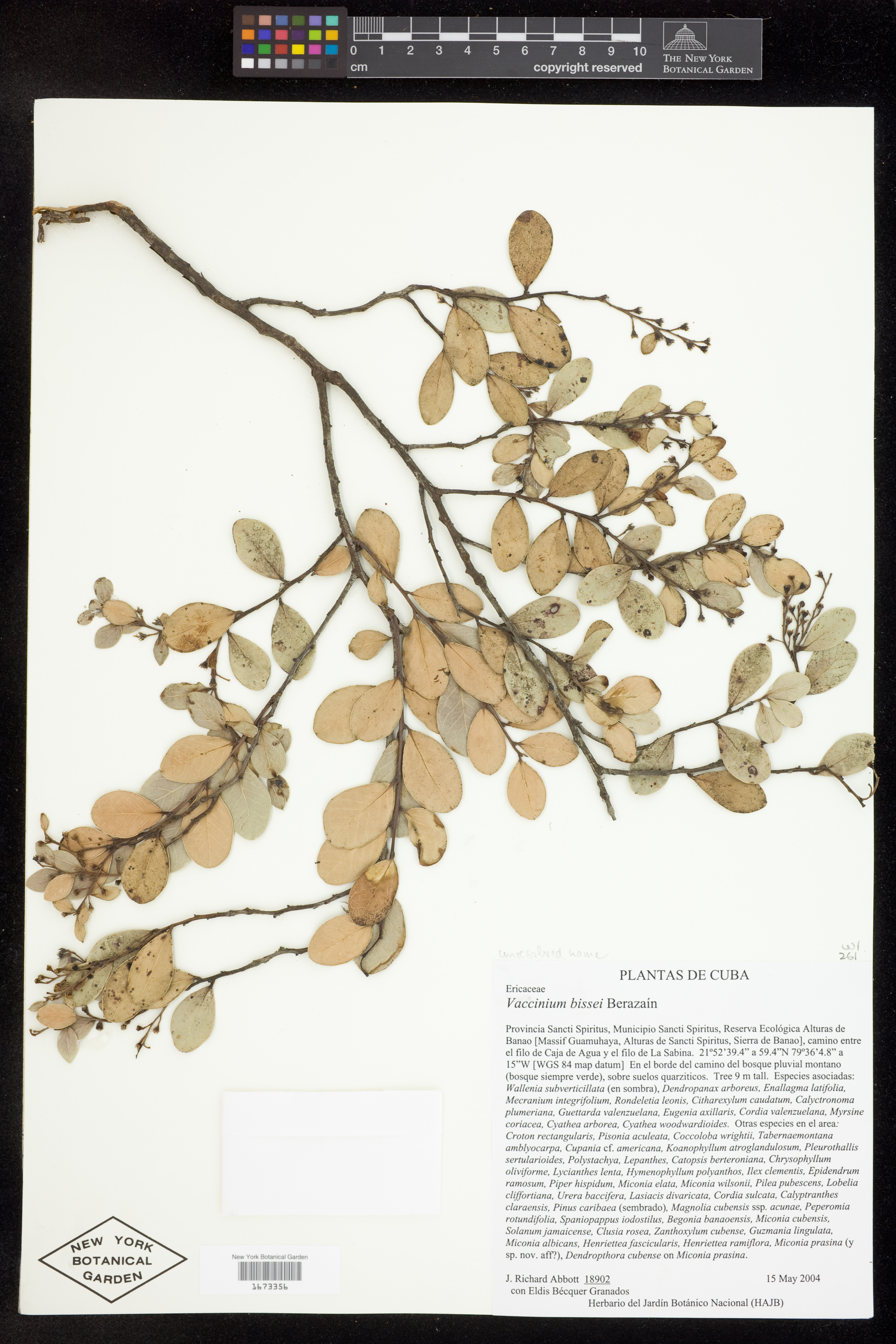

Conservation status
- Vulnerable (IUCN 2.3)

Scientific classification
- Kingdom: Plantae
- Clade: Embryophytes
- Clade: Tracheophytes
- Clade: Spermatophytes
- Clade: Angiosperms
- Clade: Eudicots
- Clade: Asterids
- Order: Ericales
- Family: Ericaceae
- Genus: Vaccinium
- Species: V. bissei

Binomial name
- Vaccinium bissei Berazaín

= Vaccinium bissei =

Species of flowering plant

Vaccinium bissei is a species of plant in the family Ericaceae. It is endemic to Cuba.
