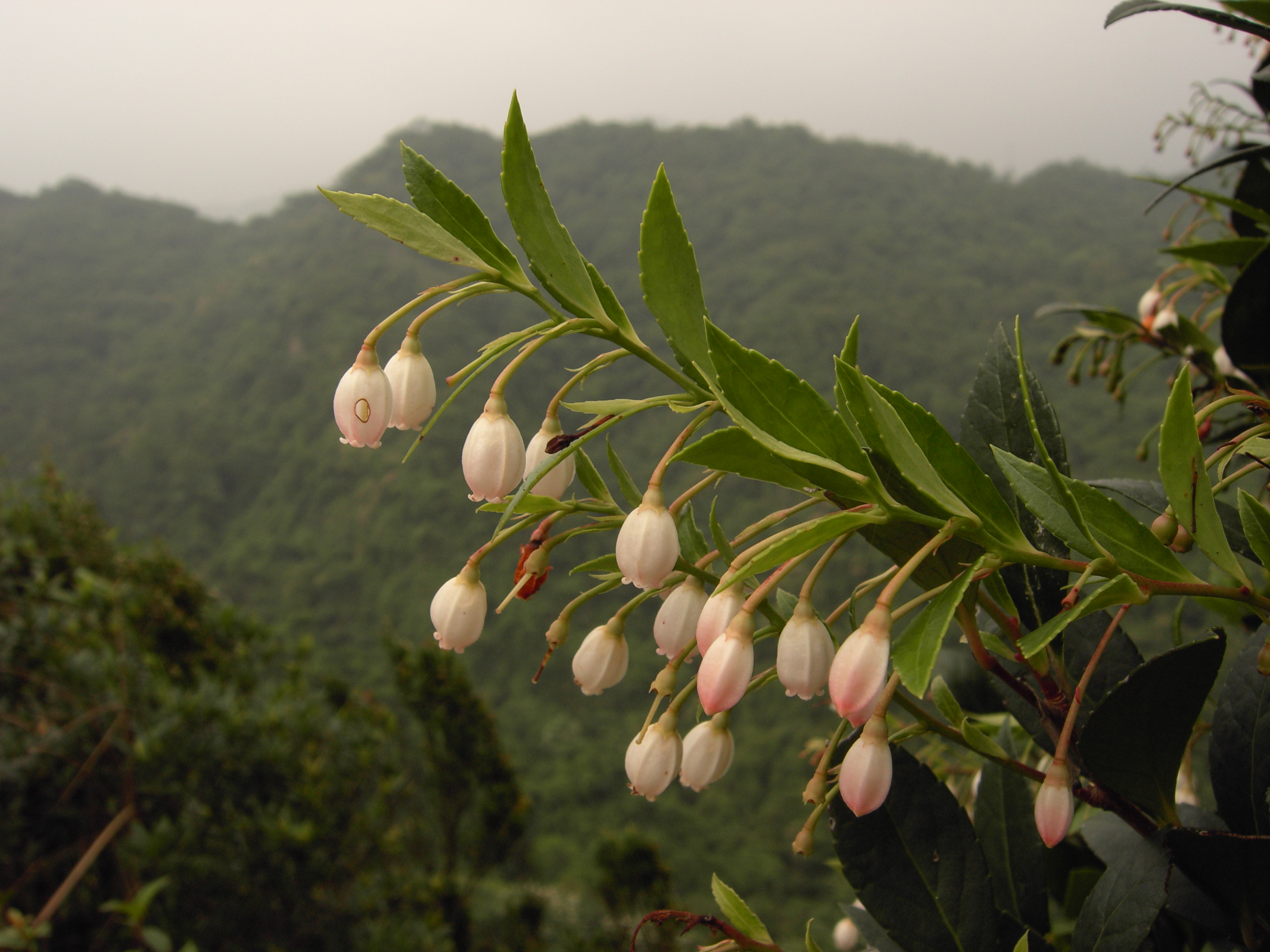

Scientific classification
- Kingdom: Plantae
- Clade: Tracheophytes
- Clade: Angiosperms
- Clade: Eudicots
- Clade: Asterids
- Order: Ericales
- Family: Ericaceae
- Genus: Vaccinium
- Species: V. wrightii

Binomial name
- Vaccinium wrightii Asa Gray, 1858

= Vaccinium wrightii =

Species of plant

Vaccinium wrightii is a species of Vaccinium native to Japan and Taiwan.
