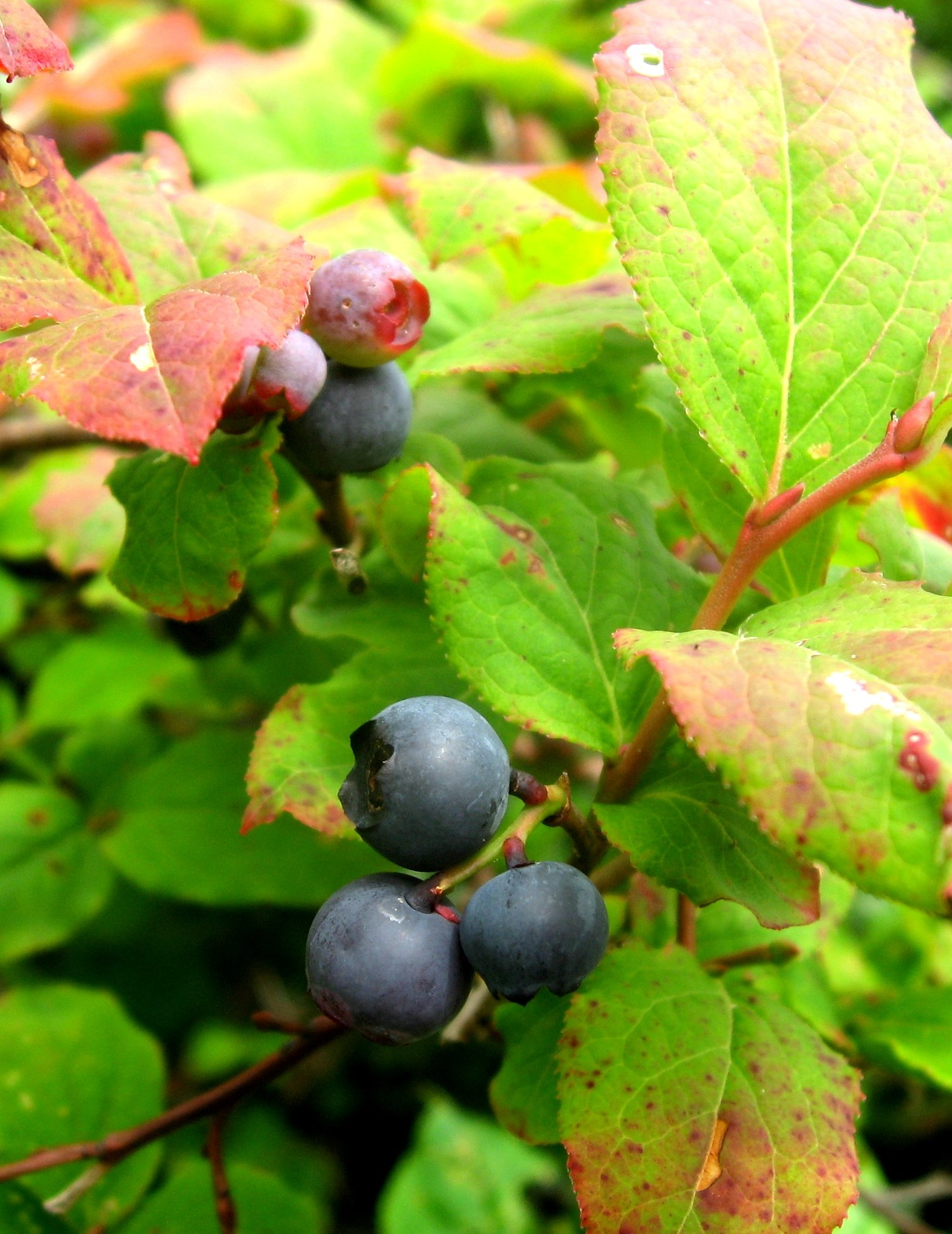

Scientific classification
- Kingdom: Plantae
- Clade: Tracheophytes
- Clade: Angiosperms
- Clade: Eudicots
- Clade: Asterids
- Order: Ericales
- Family: Ericaceae
- Genus: Vaccinium
- Species: V. smallii

Binomial name
- Vaccinium smallii A.Gray

Synonyms
- Vaccinium hirtum var. smallii (A.Gray) Maxim.; Vaccinium hirtum var. glabrum (Koidz.) Nakai; Vaccinium hirtum var. versicolor Koidz.; Vaccinium kansaiense Koidz.; Vaccinium smallii var. glabrescens H.Hara; Vaccinium smallii var. glabrum Koidz.; Vaccinium smallii var. minus Nakai; Vaccinium versicolor (Koidz.) Nakai; Vaccinium versicolor var. minus (Nakai) H.Hara

= Vaccinium smallii =

Species of flowering plant

Vaccinium smallii is a species of flowering plant in the family Ericaceae. It is a shrub native to east Asia, and was described in 1859.

== Taxonomy ==
The species was described by Asa Gray in 1859.

== Distribution ==
Vaccinium smallii is native to the temperate biome of Russia (Sakhalin), the Kuril Islands, and Japan. It grows in sunny places and thickets, and prefers moist, acidic soils.

== Description ==
Vaccinium smallii is a deciduous shrub or subshrub that grows up to 1.5 metres (4.9 ft) high. It is a hermaphrodite. The plant flowers in June. The fruit is around 6 millimetres (0.24 in) wide.

== Ecology ==
Vaccinium smallii is pollinated by insects.

== Uses ==
The fruit can be eaten raw or cooked.

== Nomenclature ==
In Japanese, the species is known as スノキ (sunoki) or ケナシオオバスノキ (kenashioobasunoki). In Russian, it is known as Черника Смолла (Cernika Smolla).
