= Vaccinium poasanum =

Conservation status
- Least Concern (IUCN 3.1)

Scientific classification
- Kingdom: Plantae
- Clade: Embryophytes
- Clade: Tracheophytes
- Clade: Angiosperms
- Clade: Eudicots
- Clade: Asterids
- Order: Ericales
- Family: Ericaceae
- Genus: Vaccinium
- Species: V. poasanum

Binomial name
- Vaccinium poasanum Donn.Sm., 1897

Species of plant

Vaccinium poasanum is a species of hemiepiphytic shrub in the family of Ericaceae native to Central America. It produces small bell-shaped flowers and small berries which are edible and turn dark purple when fully mature.
