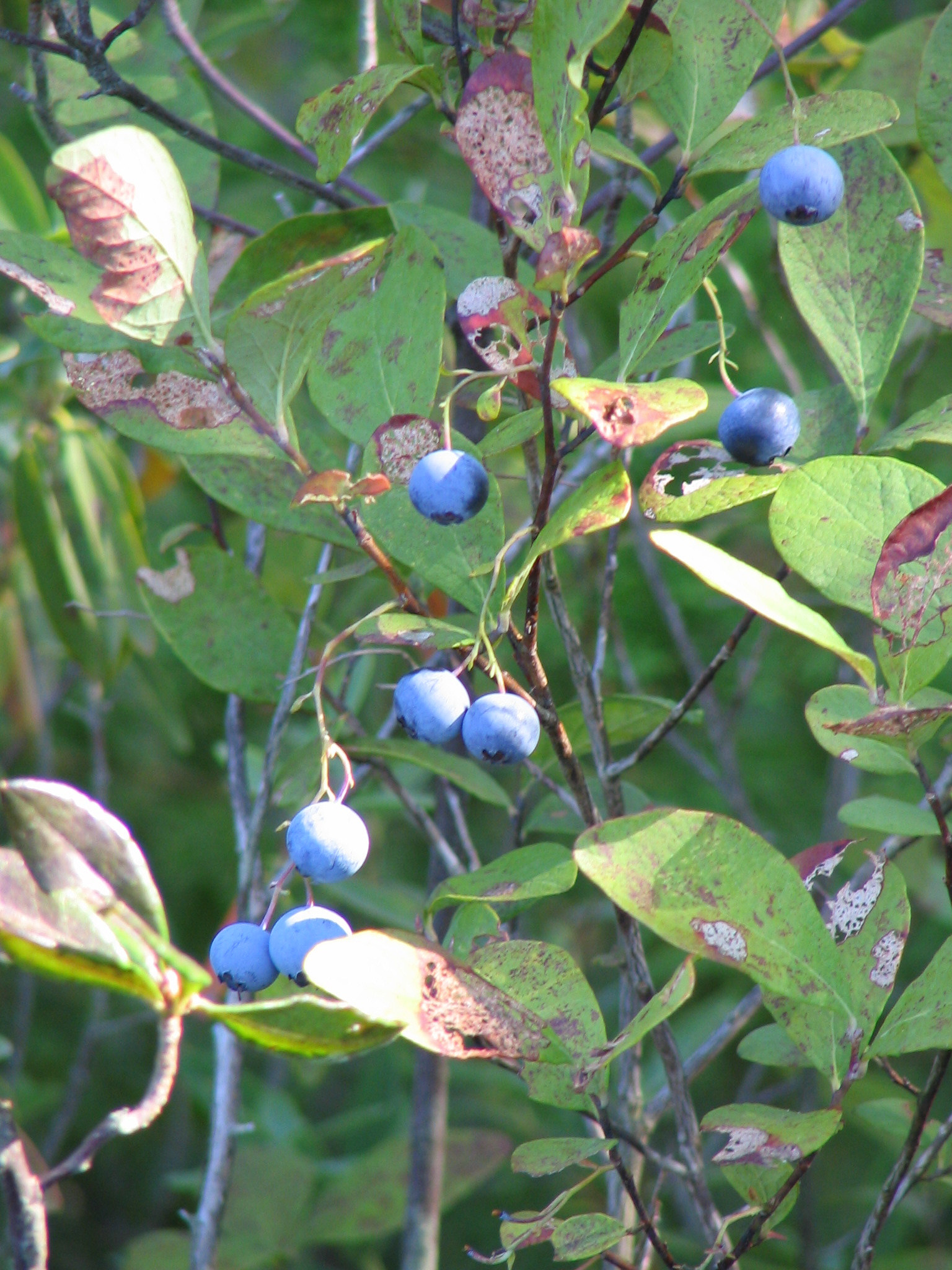

Scientific classification
- Kingdom: Plantae
- Clade: Embryophytes
- Clade: Tracheophytes
- Clade: Spermatophytes
- Clade: Angiosperms
- Clade: Eudicots
- Clade: Asterids
- Order: Ericales
- Family: Ericaceae
- Genus: Vaccinium
- Section: Vaccinium sect. Cyanococcus
- Species: V. caesariense

Binomial name
- Vaccinium caesariense Mack.

= Vaccinium caesariense =

Vaccinium caesariense New Jersey blueberry

Berry and plant

Vaccinium caesariense (New Jersey blueberry) is a Vaccinium species native to the Eastern United States.

== Description ==
Vaccinium caesariense is a perennial plant and a dicot exhibiting a shrub growth habit, meaning it is not likely to grow larger than 5 meters (16 feet) in height, particularly due to its numerous woody stems. During summer, it has simple, small, oval green leaves, which it loses by winter.

== Etymology ==
The species' prominence around New Jersey gives rise to both its common and its scientific name (Nova Caesarea being the usual Latin name of New Jersey).

== Distribution and habitat ==
Vaccinium caesariense is native to the Eastern United States, and is especially prominent in the New Jersey area. It is found in the coastal states from Florida to New Hampshire, almost always in wetlands. Some of its native habitats include pine barrens, upland meadows and woods, ravines, and mountain summits.

== Cultivation and conservation ==
In commercial cultivation of Vaccinium caesariense, they are usually planted at the beginning of fall or the end of winter, with organic fertilizers such as manure compost and vermicompost. As the plants develop woody stems irrigation is only needed during very dry periods. The cultivated plants are grown in soil that is accommodating to acidophilic plants.

New Jersey has developed environmental and agricultural programs to protect and develop the New Jersey blueberry, such as the Blueberry Plant Certification Program and the Phillip E. Marucci Center for Blueberry & Cranberry Research & Extension.

=== New Jersey hybrid ===
Although the species is still found growing in natural habitats, most of New Jersey's cultivated blueberries are a hybrid Highbush type. It was first developed by Elizabeth Coleman White, the daughter of a cranberry farmer, and introduced in Whitesbog, Burlington County, New Jersey. During harvest season, New Jersey farmers set up road-side farm stands and sell the fresh blueberries. The hybrid fruit, when frozen, maintains quality and taste upon thawing.
