= Vaccinium dunalianum =

- Vaccinium dunalianum var. caudatifolium

Conservation status
- Least Concern (IUCN 3.1)

Scientific classification
- Kingdom: Plantae
- Clade: Tracheophytes
- Clade: Angiosperms
- Clade: Eudicots
- Clade: Asterids
- Order: Ericales
- Family: Ericaceae
- Genus: Vaccinium
- Species: V. dunalianum

Binomial name
- Vaccinium dunalianum Wight

Varieties
- Vaccinium dunalianum var. brevifolium Sleumer; Vaccinium dunalianum var. caudatifolium (Hayata) H.L.Li; Vaccinium dunalianum var. dunalianum; Vaccinium dunalianum var. megaphyllum Sleumer; Vaccinium dunalianum var. urophyllum Rehder & E.H.Wilson

Synonyms
- Epigynium dunalianum (Wight) Klotzsch

Species of flowering plant

Vaccinium dunalianum is a species of flowering plant in the family Ericaceae. It is a shrub, climbing plant, or tree with green, purple, or pink flowers, and dark purple fruits. The species is native to Asia.

Vaccinium dunalianum was described in 1847, and is listed as of Least Concern by the IUCN.

== Taxonomy ==
The species was described by Robert Wight in 1847.

Five varieties are recognised:

- Vaccinium dunalianum var. brevifolium Sleumer - native to Arunachal Pradesh and Myanmar
- Vaccinium dunalianum var. caudatifolium (Hayata) H.L.Li - native to Taiwan
- Vaccinium dunalianum var. dunalianum - native to India (Assam), China (south-central and southeast), East Himalaya, Myanmar, Nepal, Tibet, and Vietnam
- Vaccinium dunalianum var. megaphyllum Sleumer - native to China (south-central), East Himalaya, and Myanmar
- Vaccinium dunalianum var. urophyllum Rehder & E.H.Wilson - native to China (south-central), Myanmar, Tibet, and Vietnam

== Distribution ==
Vaccinium dunalianum is native to the temperate biome of India (Assam), China (south-central and southeast), Myanmar, Nepal, Taiwan, Tibet, and Vietnam. It grows in forests and forest edges, thickets, on slopes, and on mountains, at elevations of 1,400–2,700 metres (4,600–8,900 ft).

== Description ==
Vaccinium dunalianum is an evergreen shrub, climbing plant, or tree, that grows 1–17 metres (3.3–55.8 ft) tall. The leaf stem is 5–14 millimetres (0.20–0.55 in) long. The leaves are elliptical, oblong, oblong-lanceolate, or ovate in shape, 4.5–13 centimetres (1.8–5.1 in) long, 2–5.5 centimetres (0.79–2.17 in) wide, and leathery in texture. The leaf edges are smooth.

The inflorescence is a 3–7 centimetres (1.2–2.8 in) long raceme with five to eighteen flowers. The flower stems are 5–8 millimetres (0.20–0.31 in) long. The hypanthium is 1.2–1.5 millimetres (0.047–0.059 in) long. The calyx has triangular or lanceolate lobes, which are 1–2.5 millimetres (0.039–0.098 in) long. The corolla is green, purple, or pink, broadly bell-shaped, and around 6 millimetres (0.24 in) long. The corolla has triangular lobes, which are around 2 millimetres (0.079 in) long. The plant flowers from April to May.

The fruit is a 4–12 millimetres (0.16–0.47 in) wide, dark purple berry. The plant fruits from September to December.

== Conservation ==
In 2018, the IUCN assessed Vaccinium dunalianum as of Least Concern. The population is large, and faces no major threats.

== Nomenclature ==
In Chinese, the species is known as 樟葉越橘 (zhang ye yue ju), 樟叶越桔 (zhang ye yue jie), 尾叶越橘 (wei ye yue ju), or 大透骨草 (da tou gu cao).
