= Vaccinium barandanum =

Scientific classification
- Kingdom: Plantae
- Clade: Tracheophytes
- Clade: Angiosperms
- Clade: Eudicots
- Clade: Asterids
- Order: Ericales
- Family: Ericaceae
- Genus: Vaccinium
- Species: V. barandanum

Binomial name
- Vaccinium barandanum S.Vidal

Species of plant

Vaccinium barandanum is a species of flowering plant in the heather family. This species is an epiphyte. It grows in the Philippines.

Sebastián Vidal y Soler made it known to science in his 1886 publication Revision de Plantas Vasculares Filipinas ("Review of the Vascular Plants of the Philippines"). It is one of a number of plants dedicated by Vidal to Sr. D. José Sainz de Baranda, his colleague in the forestry service of the Philippines.
