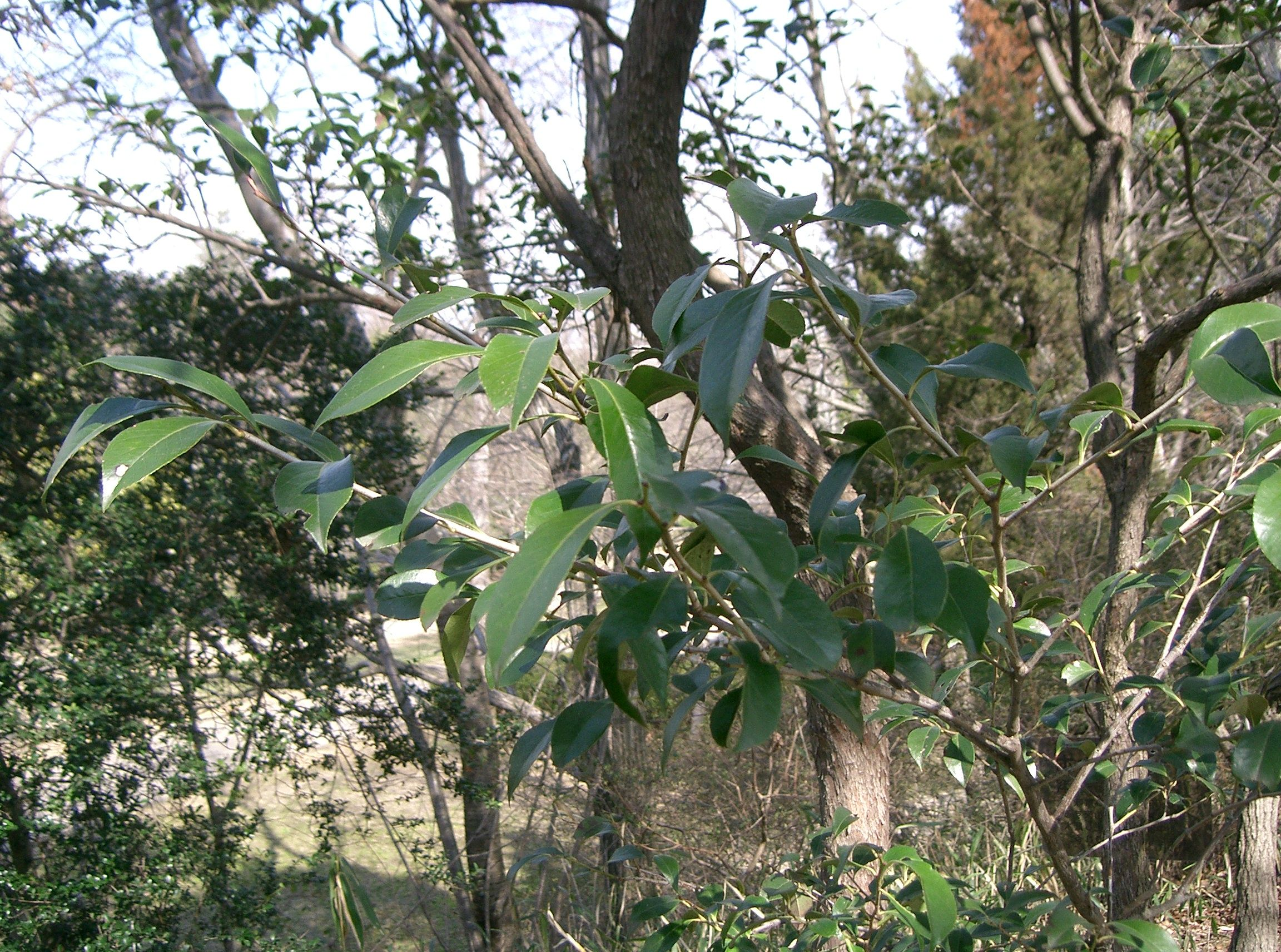
- Foliage

Conservation status
- Least Concern (IUCN 3.1)

Scientific classification
- Kingdom: Plantae
- Clade: Embryophytes
- Clade: Tracheophytes
- Clade: Angiosperms
- Clade: Eudicots
- Clade: Asterids
- Order: Ericales
- Family: Ericaceae
- Genus: Vaccinium
- Species: V. bracteatum

Binomial name
- Vaccinium bracteatum Thunb.

Synonyms
- List: Acosta spicata Lour.; Agapetes acosta Dunal; Agapetes spicata (Lour.) S.Moore; Andromeda sinensis Steud.; Epigynium acosta Klotzsch; Epigynium malaccense (Wight) Klotzsch; Pieris coreana H.Lév.; Pieris divaricata H.Lév.; Pieris fauriei H.Lév.; Pieris lucida H.Lév.; Pieris sinensis Sweet; Vaccinium acosta Raeusch.; Vaccinium buergeri Miq.; Vaccinium cambodianum Dop; Vaccinium donianum Miq.; Vaccinium idsuroei Franch. & Sav.; Vaccinium malaccense Wight; Vaccinium orientale Sw.; Vaccinium pubicarpum Ridl.; Vaccinium siamense H.R.Fletcher; Vaccinium spicatum (Lour.) Poir.

= Vaccinium bracteatum =

Species of flowering plant

Vaccinium bracteatum, the sea bilberry or Asiatic bilberry, is a species of Vaccinium native to Asia.

== Description ==
It is a small tree or large shrub, with dark purple edible fruit.

== Varieties ==
The following varieties are currently accepted:

- Vaccinium bracteatum var. chinense (Champ. ex Benth.) Chun ex Sleumer
- Vaccinium bracteatum var. obovatum C.Y.Wu & R.C.Fang
- Vaccinium bracteatum var. rubellum P.S.Hsu, J.X.Qiu, S.F.Huang & Y.Zhang
- Vaccinium bracteatum var. thysanocalyx (Dop) Smitinand & P.H.Hô

== Distribution and habitat ==
It is native to Japan, the Ryukyu Islands, Korea, southeast and south-central China, Hainan, Taiwan, mainland Southeast Asia, Java, and Sumatra.

== Uses ==
It is in semi-cultivation in China. Local people collect and consume the fruit. Additionally, a bluish-violet dye is extracted from the leaves, being used as a hair dye, for coloring vinegar, and in cooking. The dye turns black when cooked with rice, providing culinary interest.
