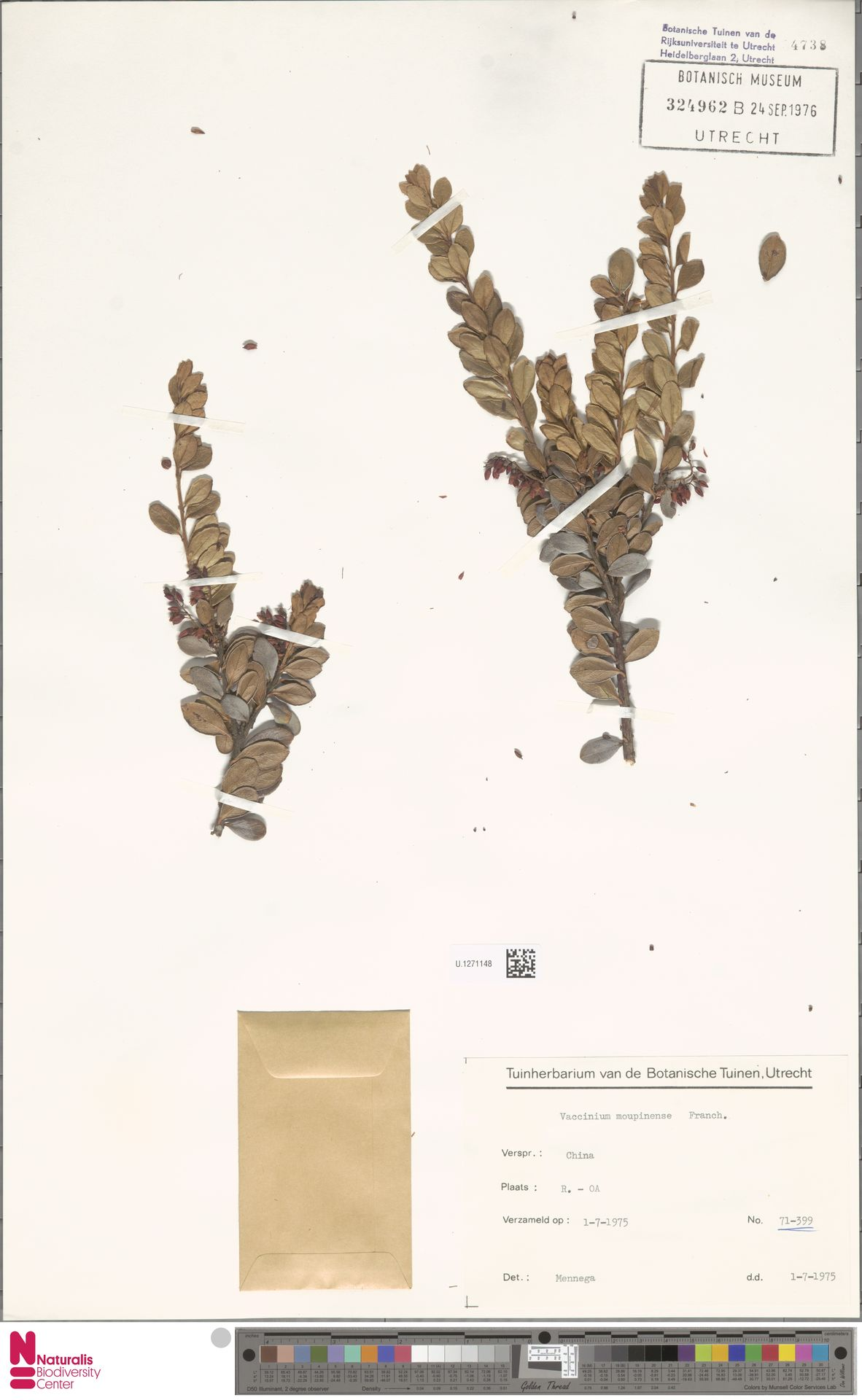

Scientific classification
- Kingdom: Plantae
- Clade: Tracheophytes
- Clade: Angiosperms
- Clade: Eudicots
- Clade: Asterids
- Order: Ericales
- Family: Ericaceae
- Genus: Vaccinium
- Species: V. moupinense

Binomial name
- Vaccinium moupinense Franch.

= Vaccinium moupinense =

Species of shrub

Vaccinium moupinense, also known as the Himalayan blueberry, is a species of perennial shrub in the genus Vaccinium. The shrub is native to the Chinese Himalayas, particularly to Western Sichuan Province. It flowers in late spring and early summer.
