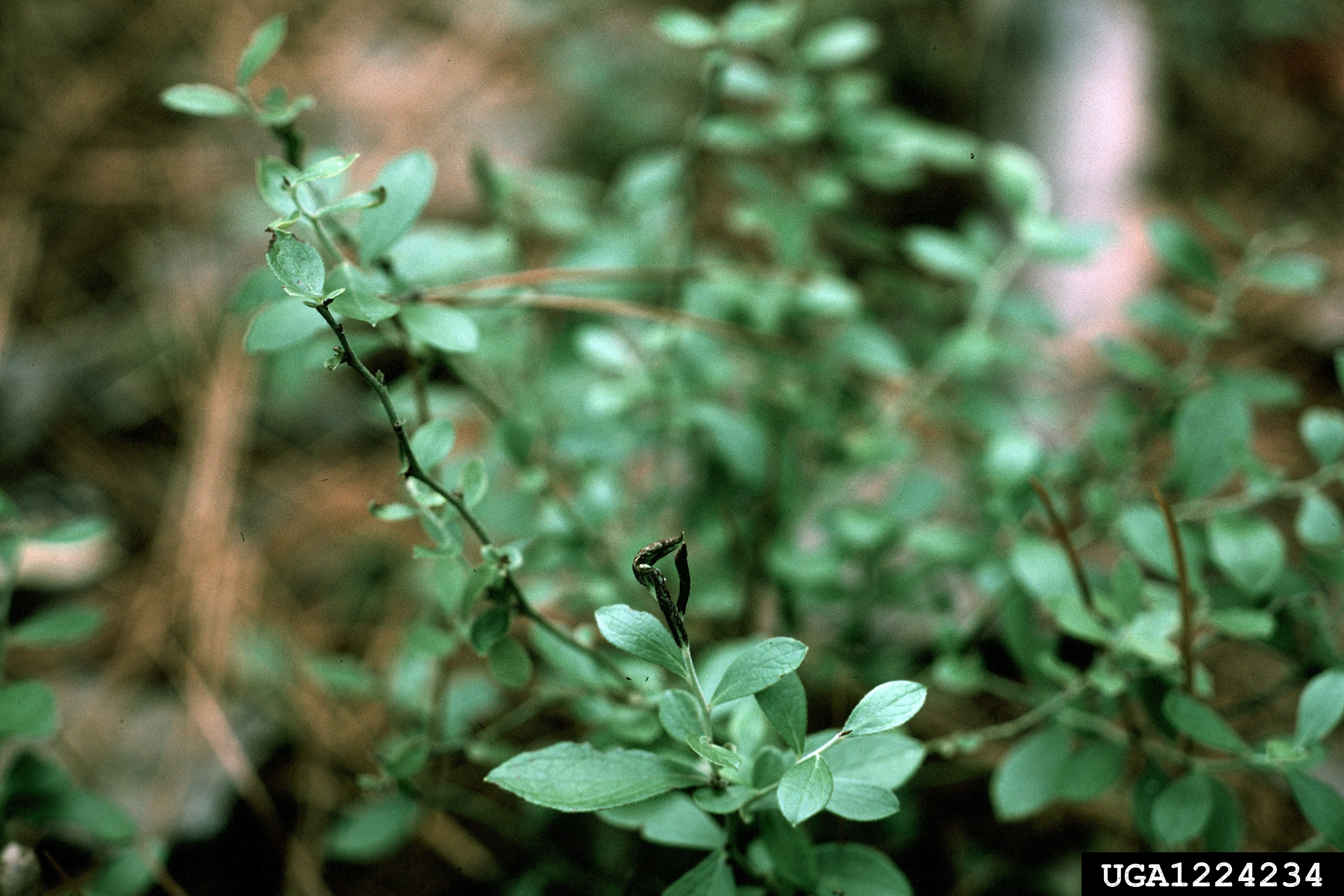

Conservation status
- Secure (NatureServe)

Scientific classification
- Kingdom: Plantae
- Clade: Embryophytes
- Clade: Tracheophytes
- Clade: Spermatophytes
- Clade: Angiosperms
- Clade: Eudicots
- Clade: Asterids
- Order: Ericales
- Family: Ericaceae
- Genus: Vaccinium
- Section: Vaccinium sect. Cyanococcus
- Species: V. tenellum

Binomial name
- Vaccinium tenellum Aiton

Synonyms
- Cyanococcus tenellus (Aiton) Small

= Vaccinium tenellum =

Small black blueberry

Berry and plant

Vaccinium tenellum, also known as the small black blueberry or southern blueberry, is a North American plant species.

== Description ==
Vaccinium tenellum is a deciduous shrub up to 80 centimeters (31 inches) tall, often forming large colonies. The leaves are elliptic and up to 4 cm (1 1/2 in) long.

The flowers are white or pale pink, cylindrical, up to 10 millimeters (3/8 in) long. The fruits are very dark blue, almost black, and about 7 mm (1/4 in) across. The species is diploid, with 24 total chromosomes.

== Distribution and habitat ==
It is native to the southeastern United States from southeastern Mississippi to northern Florida to southern Virginia. It grows in forests and in shrubby areas at elevations up to 200 m (660 ft).
