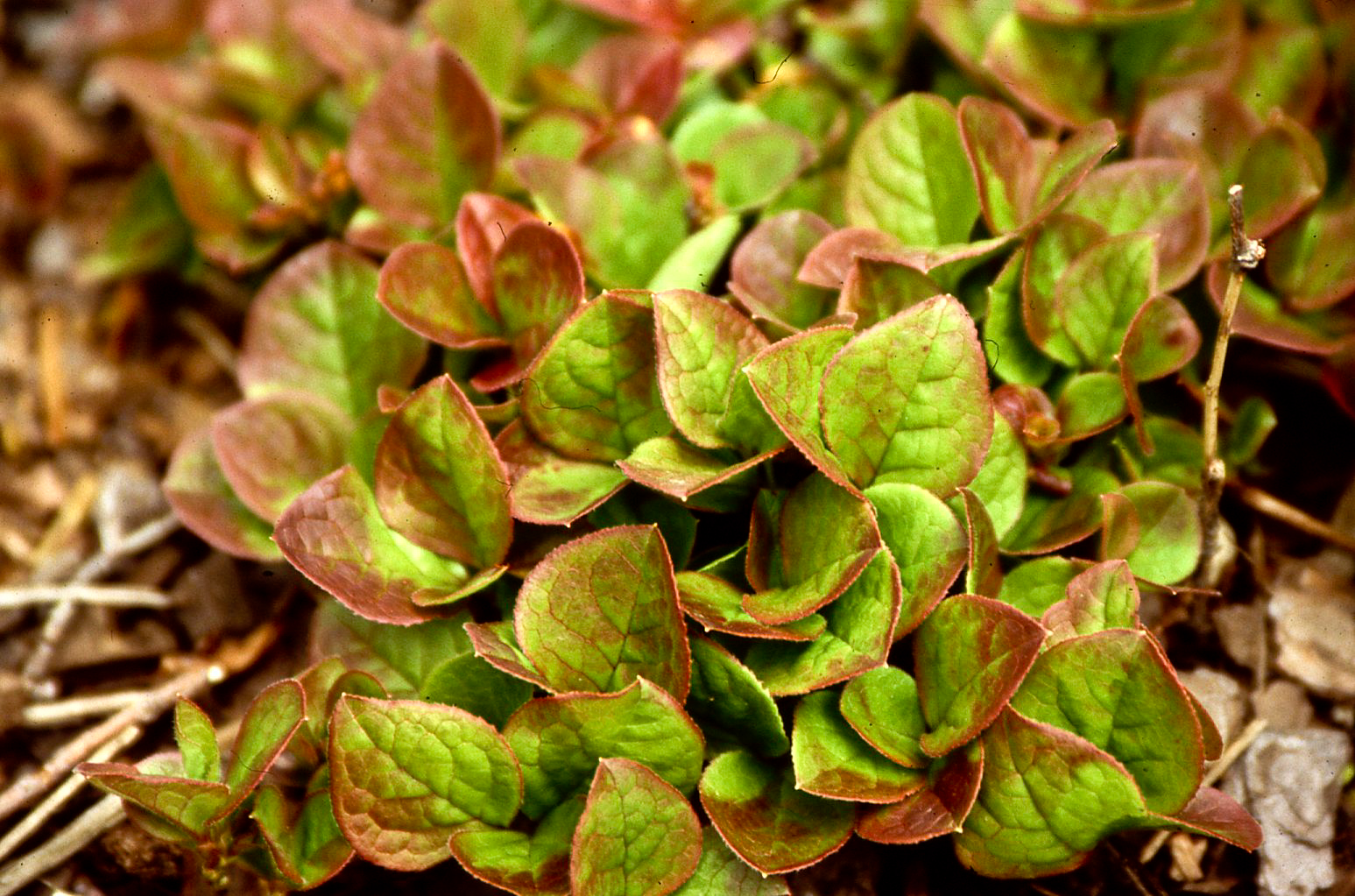

Scientific classification
- Kingdom: Plantae
- Clade: Embryophytes
- Clade: Tracheophytes
- Clade: Spermatophytes
- Clade: Angiosperms
- Clade: Eudicots
- Clade: Asterids
- Order: Ericales
- Family: Ericaceae
- Genus: Vaccinium
- Species: V. praestans

Binomial name
- Vaccinium praestans Lamb.

= Vaccinium praestans =

Species of shrub

Vaccinium praestans, the Kamchatka bilberry, is a perennial shrub in the family Ericaceae. In Russia it is known as the Klopovka, or stink-bug berry, due to its distinct, potent scent, resembling that of the bug.

The plant is native to Eastern Russia, but can be found in North America and East Asia. Mostly growing in the wild, it is also enjoyed as an ornamental plant, most commonly in Japan, where it is used to decorate home gardens.

== Description ==
Vaccinium praestans is a herbaceous, slow growing perennial shrub, that can grow up to 20 centimetres (8 inches) tall in an average growing season. The bark of the stem is a yellowish, gray color and grows almost horizontal with the ground. It has small leafy branches, approximately 6–10 cm (2 1/4–4 in) in length, that extend out, away from its stem. Its leaves are shaped either obovate or orbicular around the head and then taper to a narrower base. These leaves are fairly thin but stiff, usually 2–6 cm long and serrulate around the edge. The leaves are known to change color several times a season, from bright green to a purple-red color.

Blooming in June–July, the flowers range from pinkish-white to pink in color with yellowish corollas, and are 5–6 mm (3/16–1/4 in) in length. Later in summer It will fruit a juicy, bright red berry that can grow up to 8–12 mm (1/4–1/2 in) in diameter. It is referred to as "the stinkbug berry" due to its characteristic, very pronounced odor that resembles that of a secretion produced by Heteroptera bugs.

The berry contains ascorbic (70–100 mg%) and benzoic acids, rich in flavonoids and other P-active compounds, as well as tannins and various microelements. Under- and overripe berries have significantly lower percentage of useful chemical components.

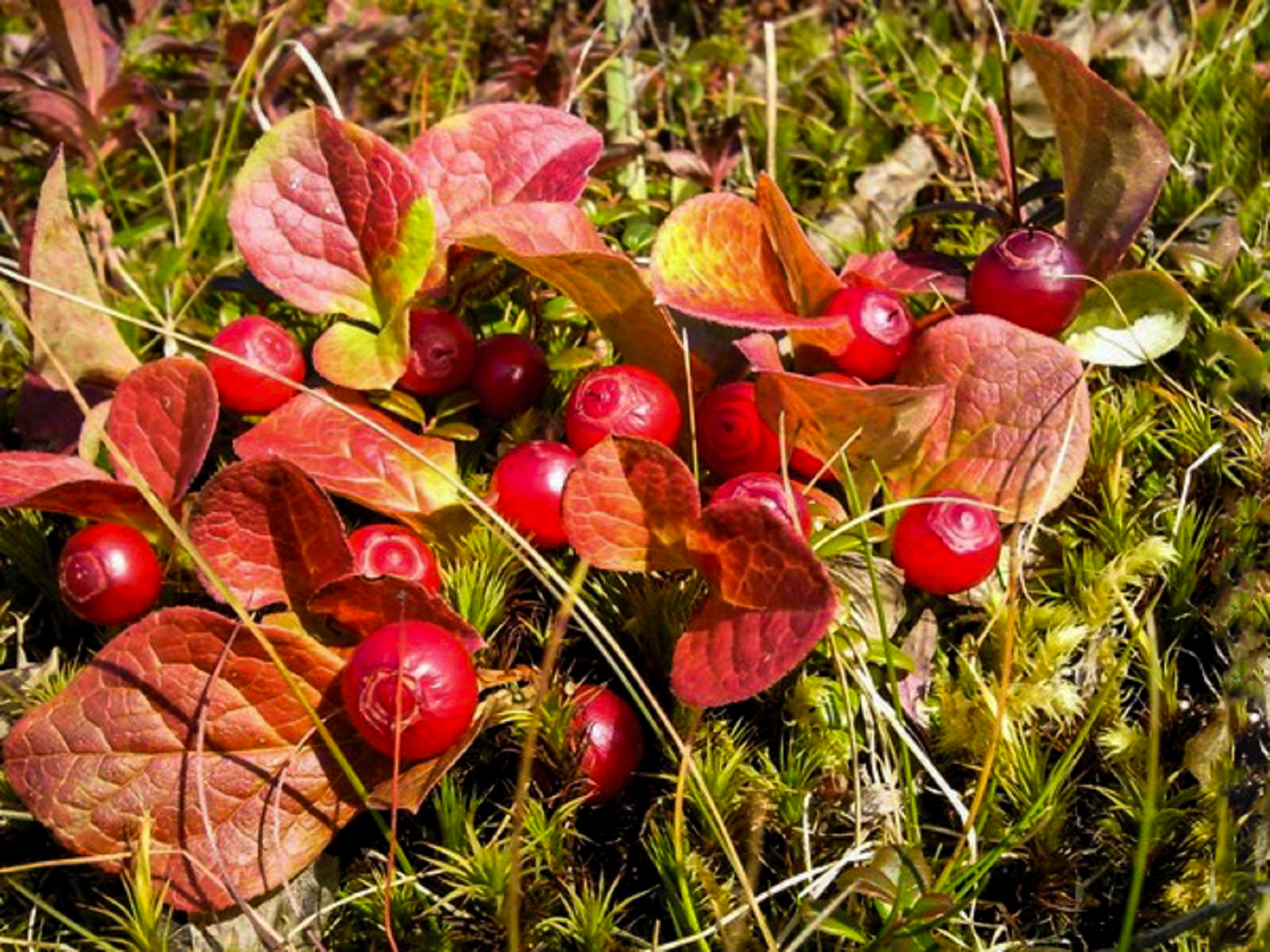
Vaccinium praestans berries

== Taxonomy ==
Vaccinium praestans is a part of the family Ericaceae, which includes species like cranberries, blueberries, and huckleberries. Ericaceae is a family of flowering plants known to be a part of the heath or heather family, usually found growing in acidic and considered infertile soil conditions. The word Vaccinium means 'huckleberry' in Latin and the word praestans means 'excellent' or 'outstanding'.

== Distribution and habitat ==
The plant is native to Kamchatka, Eastern Russia but can be found in Northern America and East Asia in spruce, fir and deciduous forests. It is found in higher elevations and slopes, growing in mossy bogs, marshes and swampy woods, often off of rotting fallen tree trunks. It is endemic to the Mountain Taiga region of Primorye, Kamchatka, Khabarovsk Region, Sakhalin, the Kuril Islands (Kunashir, Shikotan, Etorofu Simushir, Uruppu Keta), Honshu, and Hokkaido.

== Ecology ==
Vaccinium praestans is a hardy plant that can grow in harsh cold climates. However, it requires shelter from strong winds and needs insulation from snow and leafs to protect its roots in freezing temperatures. It is best suited for slightly sandy, loamy soils. It also prefers moderately moist, mesic soils with a high acidity, ranging in PH from 4.5 to 6. It can quickly become chlorotic if lime is present in the soil, which means it won't produce enough chlorophyll and its green leaves will become a pale yellow to yellow-white color. It also does not like root disturbances or stagnant water at the roots, preferring moist, yet well-drained soils but can not tolerate drought. The plant can grow in semi-shady conditions, but fruits best when in full sunlight.

=== Reproduction ===
The hermaphroditic flowers are pollinated by bees. Otherwise new plants can be raised from seed.

==== Cultivation ====
This plant is commonly grown in home gardens as an ornamental plant, especially for decorative ground cover, which also fruits a delicious berry as a bonus. In order to grow it from a seed, it is advised to plant the seeds in late winter in a pot, and just barely cover them in dirt. Seeds may require three months of cold to stratify. They are known to germinate very slowly, taking up to a year to sprout. Once seedlings are 3 cm (1.2 in) tall, the pot should be placed in a greenhouse in a lightly shaded area for its first winter. After that, it should be ready to be planted in a permanent location, usually in late spring or early summer, after last expected frost. In climates with cold winters roots must be protected from freezing, and it is commonly done by covering the plant under a pile of leaves before the coming of cold season.

== Toxicity ==
The berries can cause severe allergic reactions not only though ingestion but also through smell alone.

== Uses ==
The berries this plant fruits are known for their ambiguous flavor, which however dissipates when the berries are boiled. The berries can be eaten raw, and exhibit peculiar gustatory characteristics: they are first sweet and then sour, then fade to a bitter, but salty aftertaste. In the confectionery industry, these berries are used in making jellies and jams, preparations of marmalade, soft drinks, and pastries.

The berry juice improves digestion and possesses tonic properties. It also helps alleviate common cold and flu. The plant and its berries find use in folk medicine, believed to help with prostate hypertrophy, fever, paralysis, edema, gout, and is used to treat hypertension, due to its effectiveness in reducing blood pressure.
