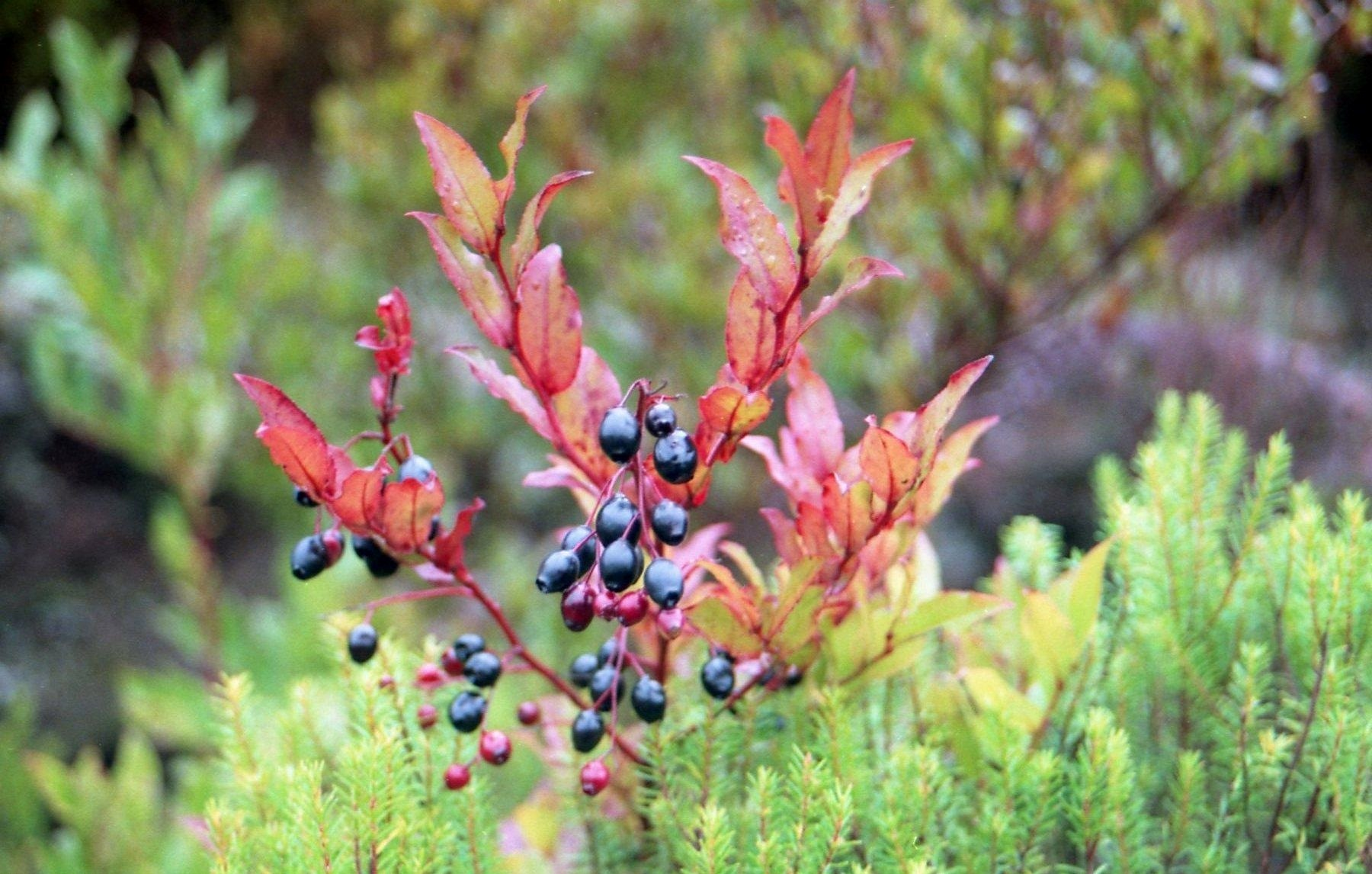

Conservation status
- Least Concern (IUCN 3.1)

Scientific classification
- Kingdom: Plantae
- Clade: Embryophytes
- Clade: Tracheophytes
- Clade: Spermatophytes
- Clade: Angiosperms
- Clade: Eudicots
- Clade: Asterids
- Order: Ericales
- Family: Ericaceae
- Genus: Vaccinium
- Species: V. padifolium

Binomial name
- Vaccinium padifolium J.E. Sm. ex A.Rees

= Vaccinium padifolium =

Species of flowering plant

Vaccinium padifolium, commonly known as Madeira blueberry or Uva-de-serra, is a Portuguese species of flowering plant.

== Description ==
It is a semi-evergreen scrub to small tree 1.5–6 metres (5–19 1/2 ft) tall. New branches are generally reddish and pubescent. The leaves are 2.5–7 centimetres (1–3 in) long and 1–2.5 cm wide, oblong to elliptic, acute to acuminate, and often flushed dark red in autumn. The petiole is short and pubescent.

The flowers are borne on curved pedicels in erect, axillary, bracteate racemes. The calyx is 3–4 millimetres (1/8–3/16 in), with five short, broad lobes up to 1.5 mm. The corolla is 7–10 mm (1/4–3/8 in), globose to campanulate, the lobes very short. There are often five broad rose stripes on the white corolla. The berries are up to 12 mm × 10 mm (1/2 in × 3/8 in), ripening blue-black.

The blue color of the berries is due to anthocyanins.

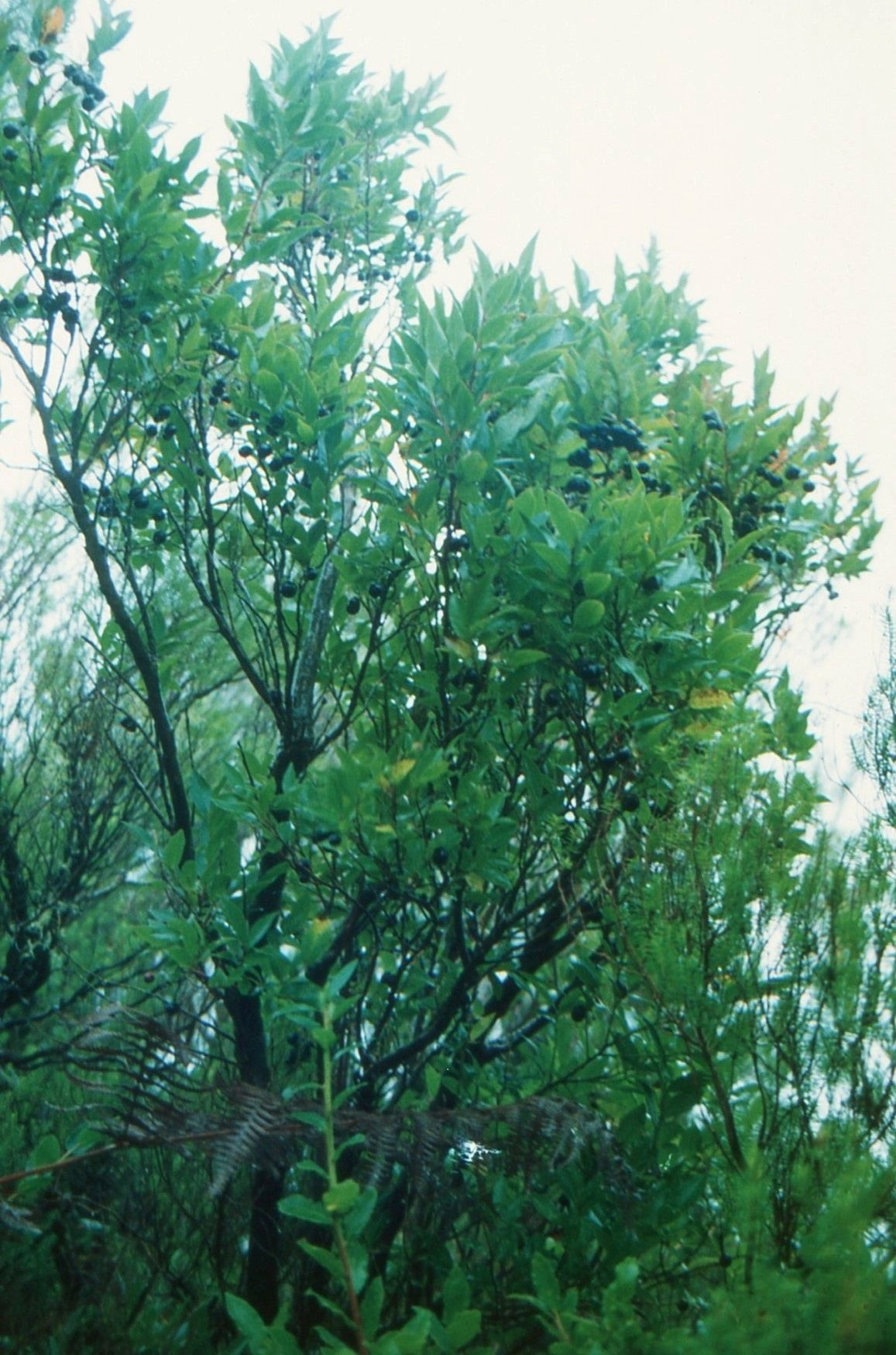
A shrub over 2 m (6 1/2 ft) tall

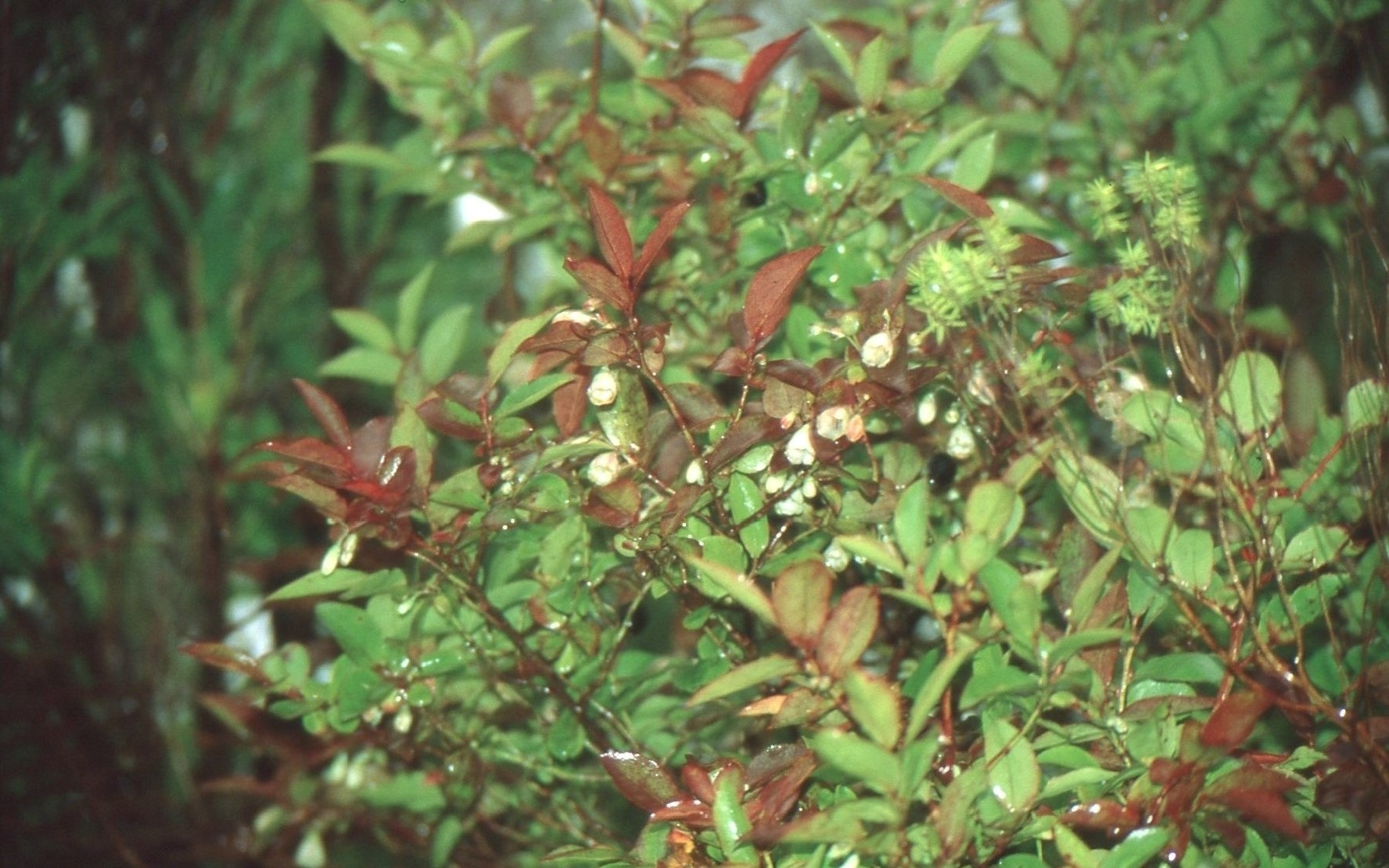
Leaves

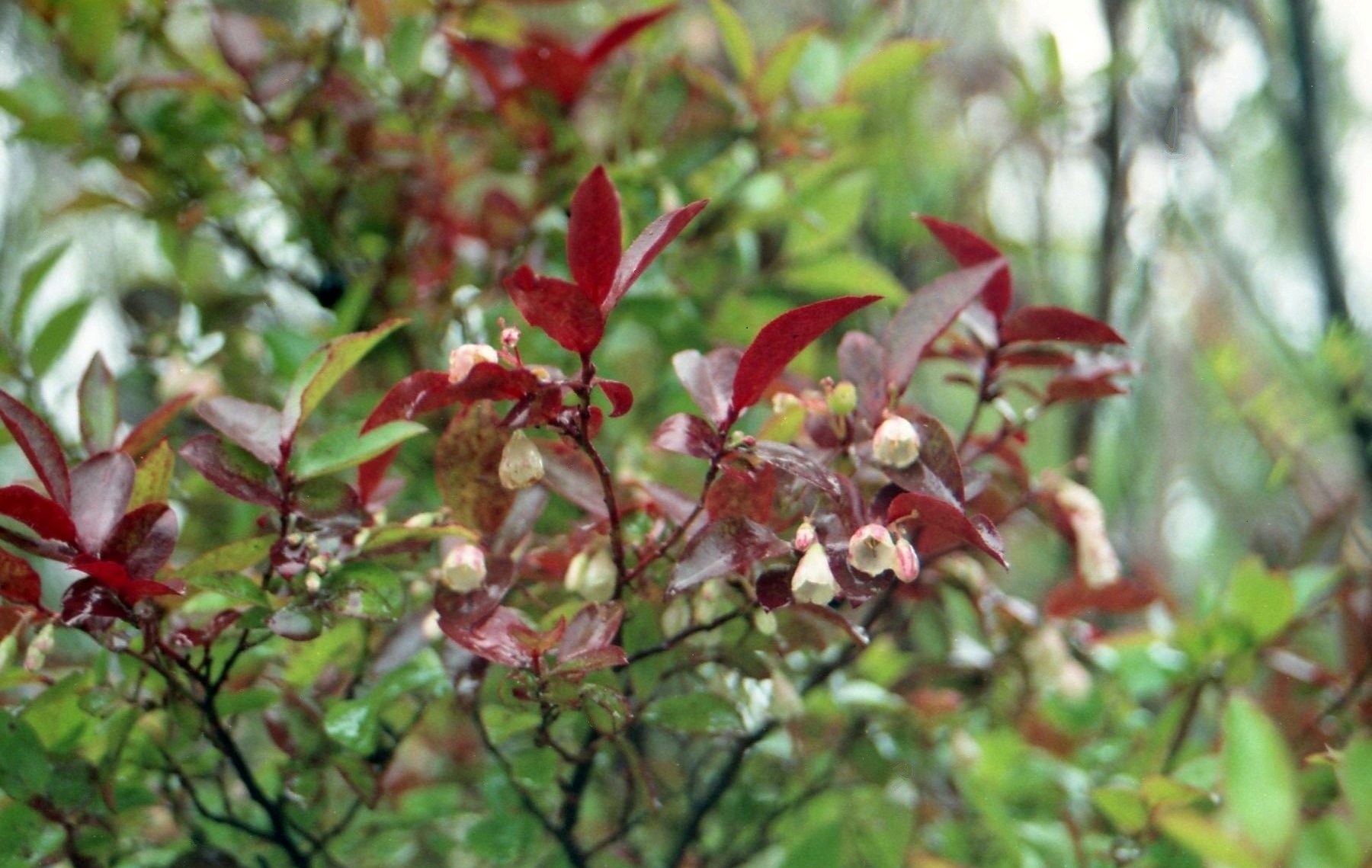
Red leaves and flowers

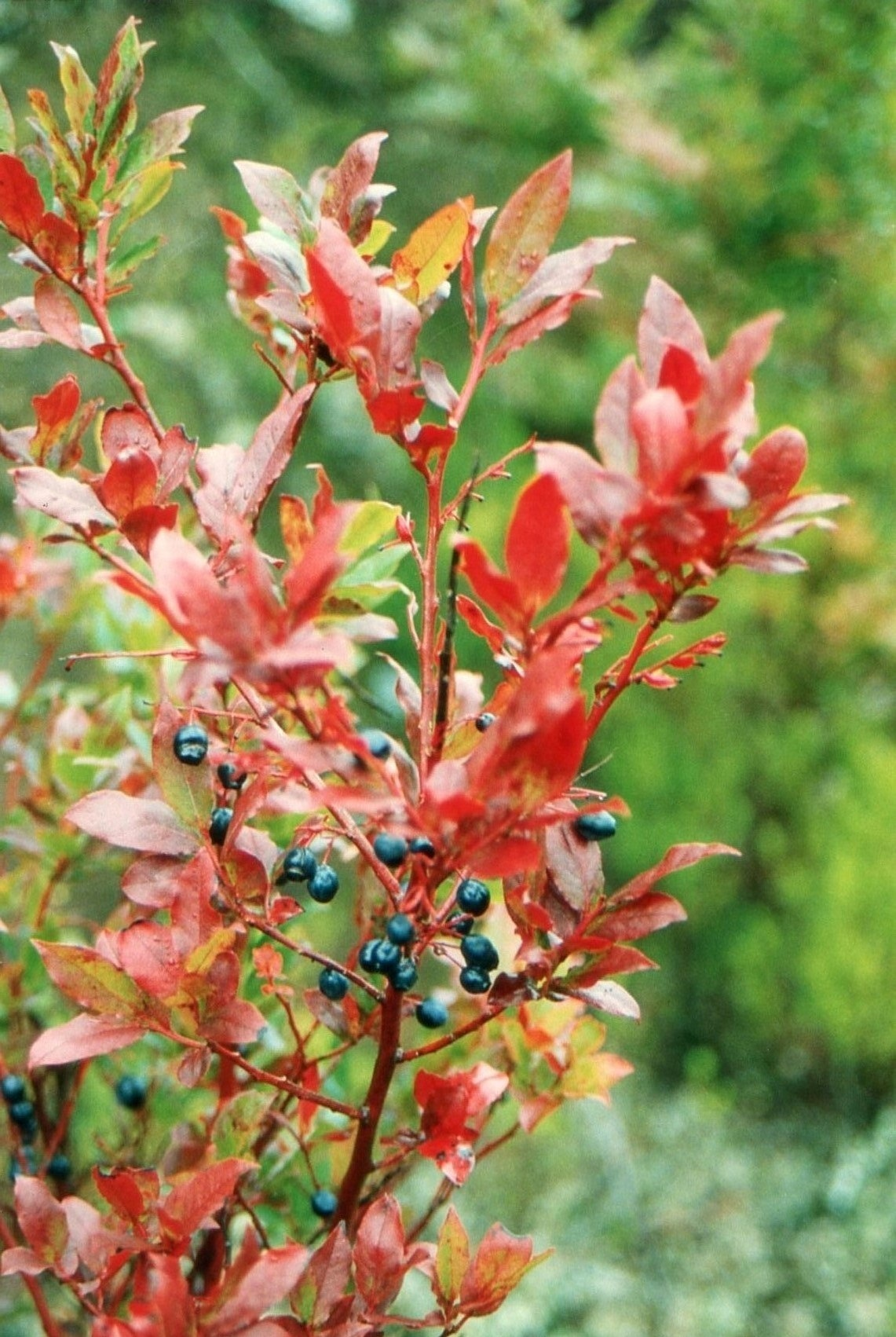
Autumn leaves and berries

== Distribution and habitat ==
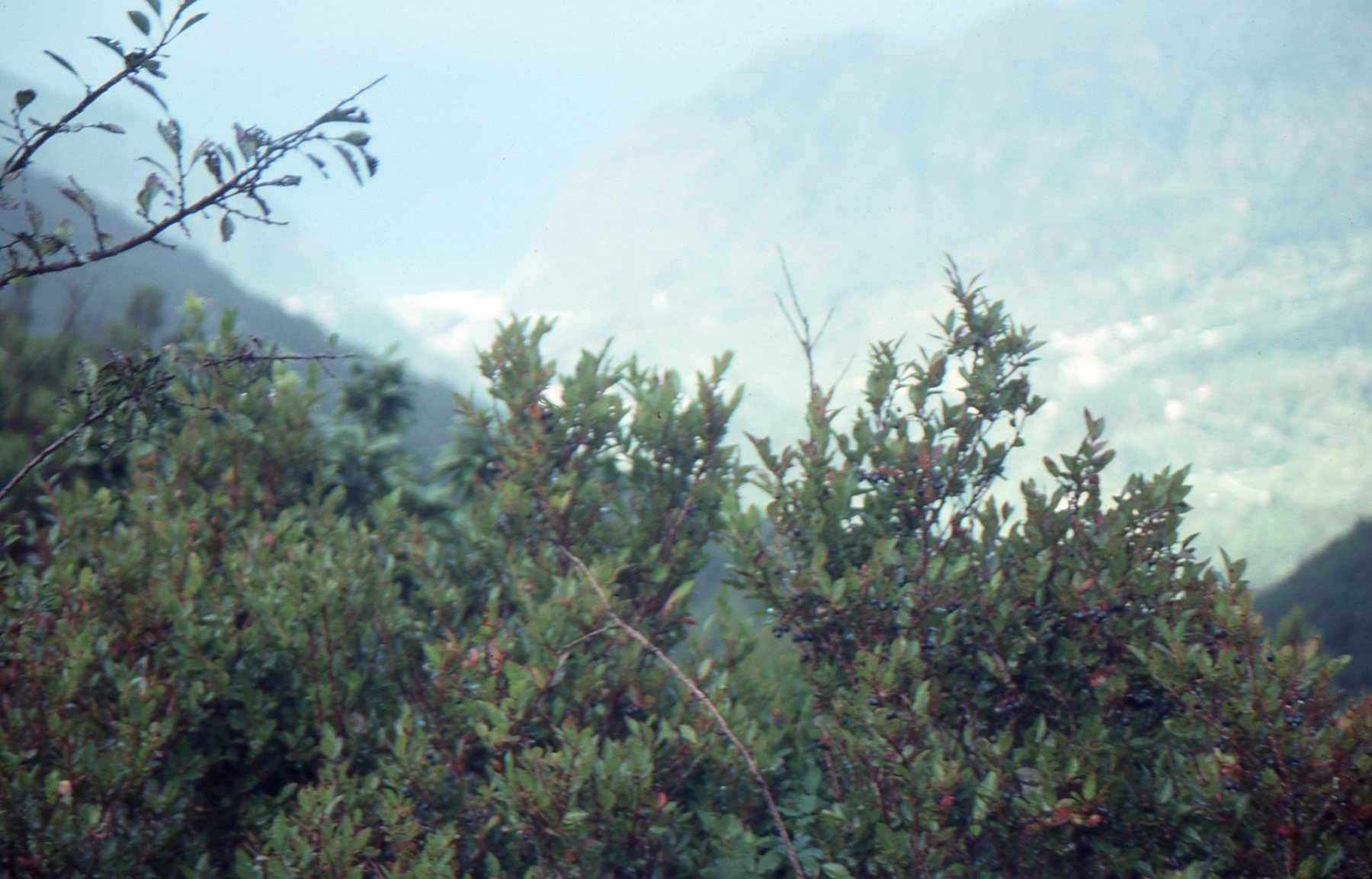
Shrubs in Madeira, Portugal

The species is endemic to the islands of Madeira and Porto Santo, Portugal. It grows mainly in crevices and exposed slopes and mountain plains. It is very common at elevations between 800 and 1,700 m (2,600 and 5,600 ft).

== Uses ==
The fruits are used in preserves.
