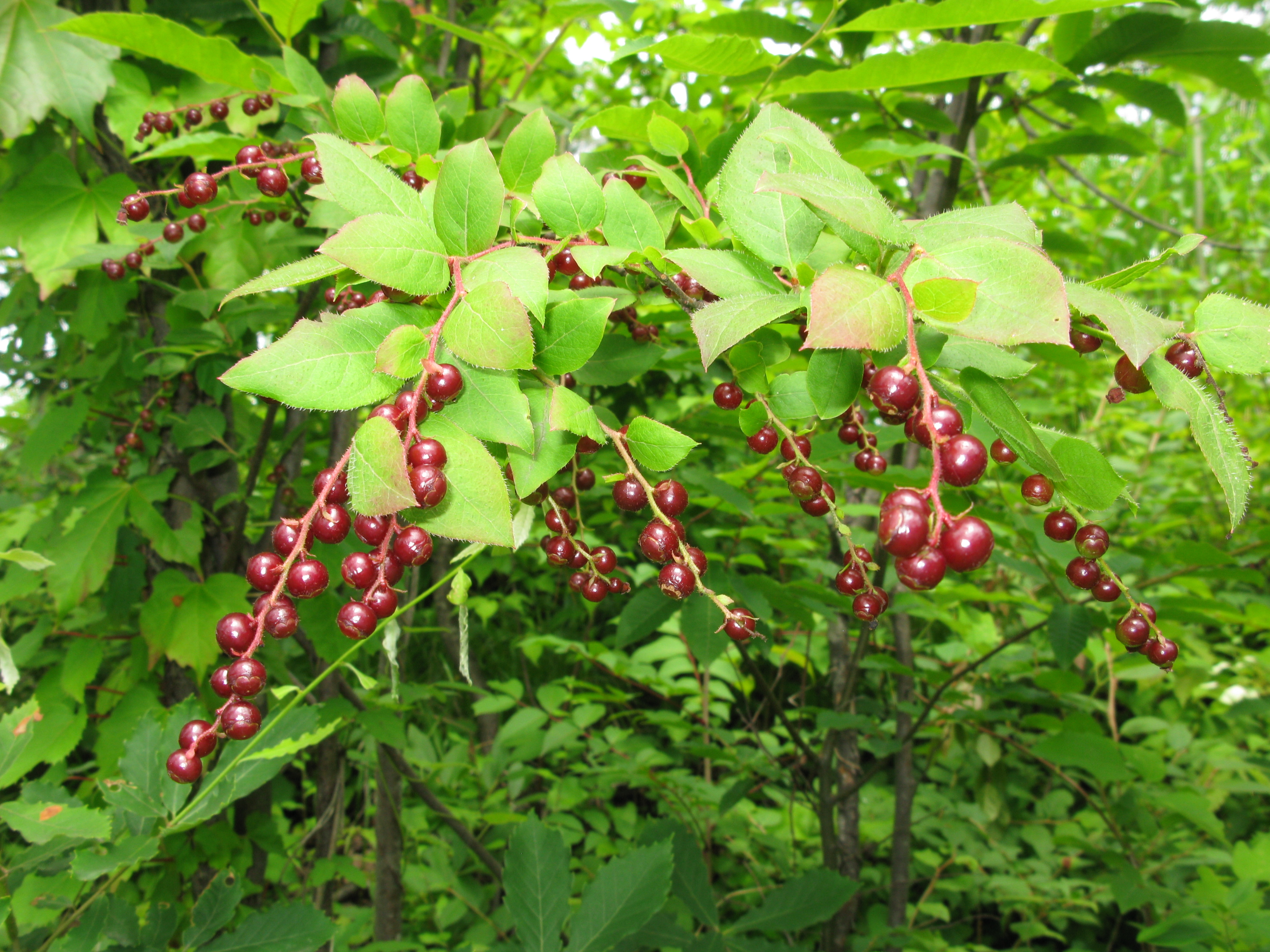

Scientific classification
- Kingdom: Plantae
- Clade: Tracheophytes
- Clade: Angiosperms
- Clade: Eudicots
- Clade: Asterids
- Order: Ericales
- Family: Ericaceae
- Genus: Vaccinium
- Species: V. oldhamii

Binomial name
- Vaccinium oldhamii Miq.

= Vaccinium oldhamii =

Species of fruit and plant

Vaccinium oldhamii is a species of Vaccinium native to China, South Korea, and Japan.
