= Vaccinium boreale =

Scientific classification
- Kingdom: Plantae
- Clade: Embryophytes
- Clade: Tracheophytes
- Clade: Spermatophytes
- Clade: Angiosperms
- Clade: Eudicots
- Clade: Asterids
- Order: Ericales
- Family: Ericaceae
- Genus: Vaccinium
- Section: Vaccinium sect. Cyanococcus
- Species: V. boreale

Binomial name
- Vaccinium boreale I.V.Hall & Aalders, 1961

Berry and plant

Vaccinium boreale, common name northern blueberry, sweet hurts, or bleuet boréal (in French), is a plant species native to North America.

== Description ==
Vaccinium boreale is a lowbush blueberry, forming a small shrub up to 9 centimetres (3 1/2 in) tall, in dense colonies of many individuals. The twigs are green, angled, with lines of hairs. The leaves are deciduous, narrowly elliptic, and up to 21 millimetres (7/8 in) long, with teeth along the margins.

The flowers are white, up to 4 mm (3/16 in) long. The berries are blue, up to 5 mm across. The cytology is 2n = 24.

== Distribution and habitat ==
The species is native to the northeastern United States and eastern Canada. It has been found in Québec, New Brunswick, Nova Scotia, Newfoundland and Labrador, Maine, New Hampshire, Vermont, and New York State. It grows in tundra (arctic or alpine), rocky uplands, and in open conifer forests at elevations up to 2,000 metres (6,600 ft).

== Cultivation ==
Lowbush blueberries, sometimes called "wild blueberries", are generally not planted by farmers, but rather are cultivated and picked wild on berry fields called "barrens".
