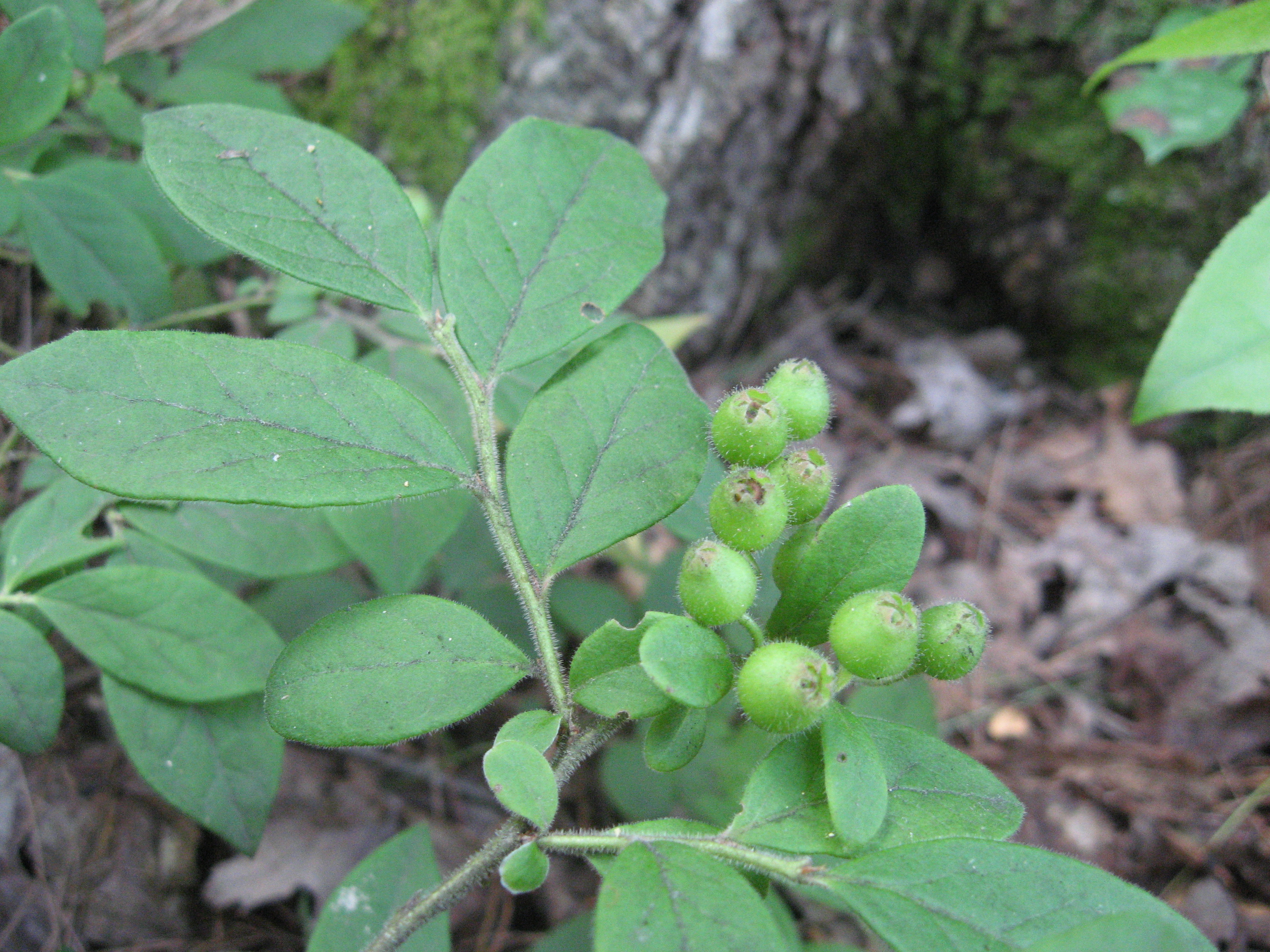

Conservation status
- Vulnerable (NatureServe)

Scientific classification
- Kingdom: Plantae
- Clade: Embryophytes
- Clade: Tracheophytes
- Clade: Spermatophytes
- Clade: Angiosperms
- Clade: Eudicots
- Clade: Asterids
- Order: Ericales
- Family: Ericaceae
- Genus: Vaccinium
- Section: Vaccinium sect. Cyanococcus
- Species: V. hirsutum

Binomial name
- Vaccinium hirsutum Buckley 1843

Synonyms
- Cyanococcus hirsutus (Buckley) Small

= Vaccinium hirsutum =

Berry and plant

Vaccinium hirsutum is a North American species of flowering plant in the heath family known by the common name hairy blueberry.

== Description ==
The species forms a shrub up to 75 centimetres (30 inches) tall, forming large colonies. The leaves are thick, elliptical, densely hairy, and up to 6.2 cm (2 1/2 in) long.

White, cylindrical flowers appear in late spring, followed by hairy, black berries in the summer.

== Distribution and habitat ==
This species is endemic to a small area in the southern Appalachian Mountains, where it is only known from a few counties in eastern Tennessee, northern Georgia, and the Carolinas.

It is native to dry oak-pine ridges, where it can be locally abundant.
