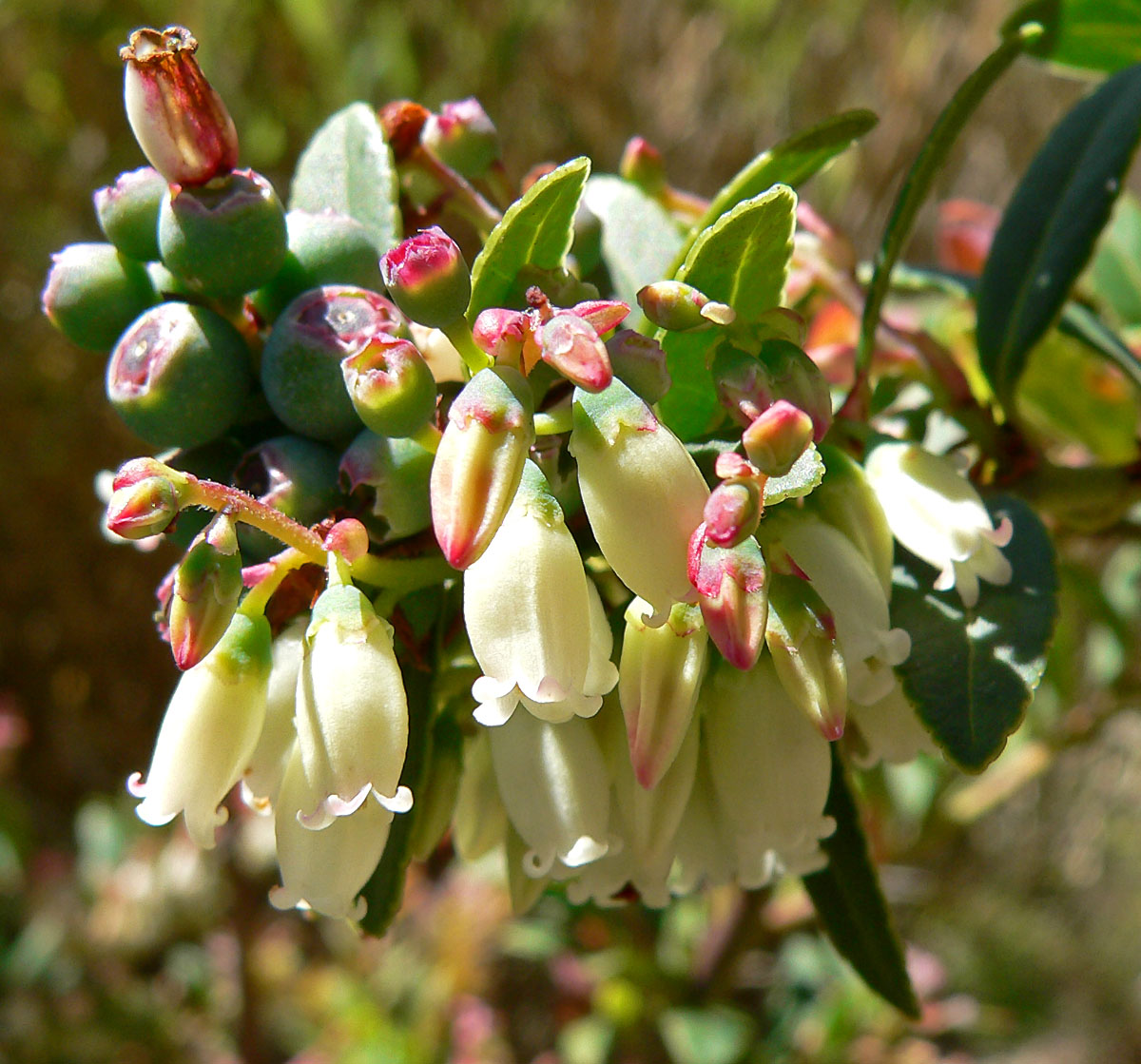

Conservation status
- Least Concern (IUCN 2.3)

Scientific classification
- Kingdom: Plantae
- Clade: Embryophytes
- Clade: Tracheophytes
- Clade: Spermatophytes
- Clade: Angiosperms
- Clade: Eudicots
- Clade: Asterids
- Order: Ericales
- Family: Ericaceae
- Genus: Vaccinium
- Section: Vaccinium sect. Pyxothamnus
- Species: V. consanguineum

Binomial name
- Vaccinium consanguineum Klotzsch 1851

Synonyms
- Vaccinium consanguineum var. irazuense (Sleumer) Sleumer 1936; Vaccinium irazuense Sleumer 1934

= Vaccinium consanguineum =

Species of flowering plant

Vaccinium consanguineum or Costa Rican blueberry is a Mesoamerican species of Vaccinium.

== Description ==
Vaccinium consanguineum is an arborescent shrub growing 0.5–10 metres (1 1/2–33 feet) tall, usually between 1 and 3 m (3 1/2 and 10 ft). Its very woody stems first appear puberulent and become glabrous with age.

The leaves are narrow or broadly elliptic, occasionally oblong, 1–4.6 centimetres (1/2–1 3/4 inches) long and 0.5–1.2 cm (1/4–1/2 in) wide, acute basally, gradually acute at apex, serrulate to crenate-serrate marginally, and glabrous. They are puberulent along the midrib below and pinnately veined. The petiole is 1.5 to 3 millimetres (1/16 to 1/8 in) long.

Blooming between August and April, the inflorescence is a raceme with several flowers. The rachis is 1 to 4 cm long, while the pedicel is 1 to 2 mm and articulated with the calyx. The hypanthium is 1 to 1.6 mm, glabrous, with lobes of 0.8 to 1.5 mm, and apically ciliate or glabrous. The corolla is cylindrical and 5 to 7.5 mm, glabrous on the outside and white, sometimes with pink or reddish tints. The thecae has two apical spurs, the tubules 1.2 to 1.8 mm.

The fruit is spherical, 5 to 6 mm in diameter, glabrous, and reddish to purple-black when ripe. It contains numerous small seeds and a small amount of pulp.

The cytology is 2n = 48. The plant reproduces from its rhizome, which is used as a dispersal method in nature, similarly to species of the Rubus genus.

=== Similar species ===
The fruit can be confused with that of the very similar looking Pernettya coriacea, which possesses a toxic compound tentatively named pernettine.

== Distribution and habitat ==
The species is found in the montane forests of southern Mexico, Honduras, Costa Rica, and Panama at altitudes of 2,100–3,100 m (6,900–10,200 ft) above mean sea level. In Costa Rica, it is found in the Talamanca mountain range and the Central Volcanic mountain range.

The plant takes advantage of disturbed areas and edges of the oak forest or páramo for its development, where it is common to find it. As its flowering coincides with the wet season and its fruiting with the beginning of the dry season, the fruits can commonly be found in December and February and even until April.

== Uses ==
Although it can be confused with a toxic species, the fruit can be consumed directly. It is also used for the manufacture of juice and jelly, resembling the flavor of those produced with other more common Vaccinium species while acquiring consistencies very similar to those produced with blackberries.
