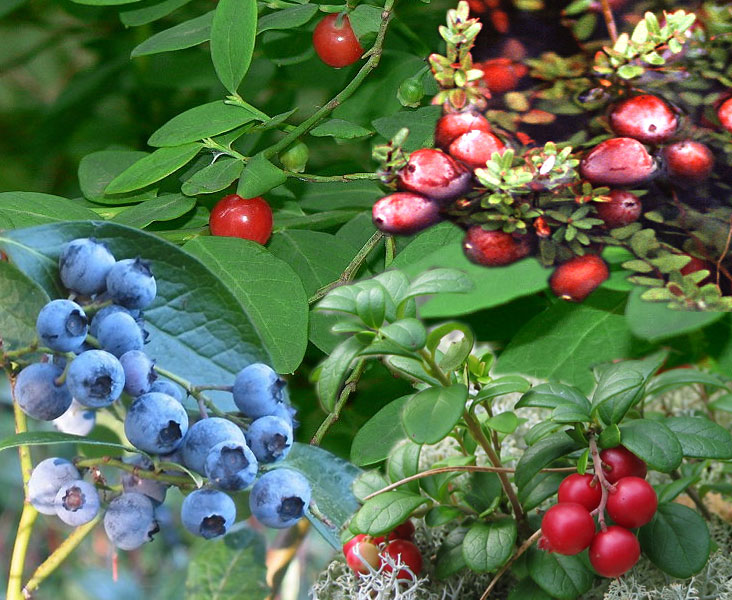
- Vaccinium berries (clockwise from top left): Red huckleberries, cranberries, lingonberries and blueberries

Scientific classification
- Kingdom: Plantae
- Clade: Tracheophytes
- Clade: Angiosperms
- Clade: Eudicots
- Clade: Asterids
- Order: Ericales
- Family: Ericaceae
- Subfamily: Vaccinioideae
- Tribe: Vaccinieae
- Genus: Vaccinium; L.

Type species
- Vaccinium uliginosum

Synonyms
- List: Andreusia Dunal; Batodendron Nutt.; Cavinium Thouars; Cyanococcus Rydb.; Disiphon Schltr.; Epigynium Klotzsch; Herpothamnus Small; Hornemannia Vahl, nom. illeg.; Hugeria Small; Malea Lundell; Metagonia Nutt.; Myrtillus Gilib., opus utique oppr.; Neojunghuhnia Koord.; Oxycoca Raf.; Oxycoccoides (Benth. & Hook.f.) Nakai, nom. superfl.; Oxycoccus Hill; Peyrusa Rich. ex Dunal, pro syn.; Picrococcus Nutt.; Polycodium Raf.; × Rhodocinium Avrorin; Rhodococcum (Rupr.) Avrorin; Schollera Roth, nom. superfl.; Symphysia C.Presl; Tauschia Preissler, nom. rej.; Vitis-idaea Ség.

= Vaccinium =

Genus of berry-producing shrubs in the heath family

Vaccinium (/vækˈsɪniəm/ vak-SIN-ee-əm) is a common and widespread genus of shrubs or dwarf shrubs in the heath family (Ericaceae). The fruits of many species are eaten by humans and some are of commercial importance, including the cranberry, blueberry, bilberry (whortleberry), lingonberry (cowberry), and huckleberry. Like many other heath plants, they are restricted to acidic soils.

== Description ==
The plant structure varies between species: some trail along the ground, some are dwarf shrubs, and some are larger shrubs perhaps 1 to 2 metres (3 to 7 feet) tall. Some tropical species are epiphytic. Stems are usually woody. Species found in tropical bioregions like Malesia are evergreen.

Flowers are epigynous with fused petals and have long styles that protrude from their bell-shaped corollas. Inflorescences can be axillary or terminal. Stamens have anthers with extended tube-like structures called "awns" through which pollen is released when mature.

The fruit develops from an inferior ovary and is a four- or five-parted berry; it is usually brightly coloured, often red or bluish with purple juice. Its seeds are small and smooth on the surface. Roots are commonly mycorrhizal, which likely help the plants to access nutrients such as nitrogen and phosphorus in the acidic, nutrient-poor soils they inhabit.

== Taxonomy ==
The genus was first described scientifically by Carl Linnaeus in 1753. The name Vaccinium was used in classical Latin for a plant, possibly the bilberry or a hyacinth, and may be derived from the Latin bacca, meaning berry, although its ultimate derivation is obscure. It is not the same word as vaccinum, which means "of or pertaining to cows".

The taxonomy of the genus is complex and still under investigation. Genetic analyses indicate that the genus Vaccinium is not monophyletic. A number of the Asian species are more closely related to Agapetes than to other Vaccinium species. A second group includes most of Orthaea and Notopora, at least some of Gaylussacia (huckleberry), and a number of species from Vaccinium, such as V. crassifolium. Other parts of Vaccinium form other groups, sometimes together with species of other genera. The taxonomy of Vaccinium can either be resolved by enlarging the genus to include the entirety of the tribe Vaccinieae or by breaking the genus up into several genera.

Two fossil seeds of V. minutulum have been extracted from borehole samples of the Middle Miocene freshwater deposits in Nowy Sacz Basin, West Carpathians, Poland.

=== Subgenera ===
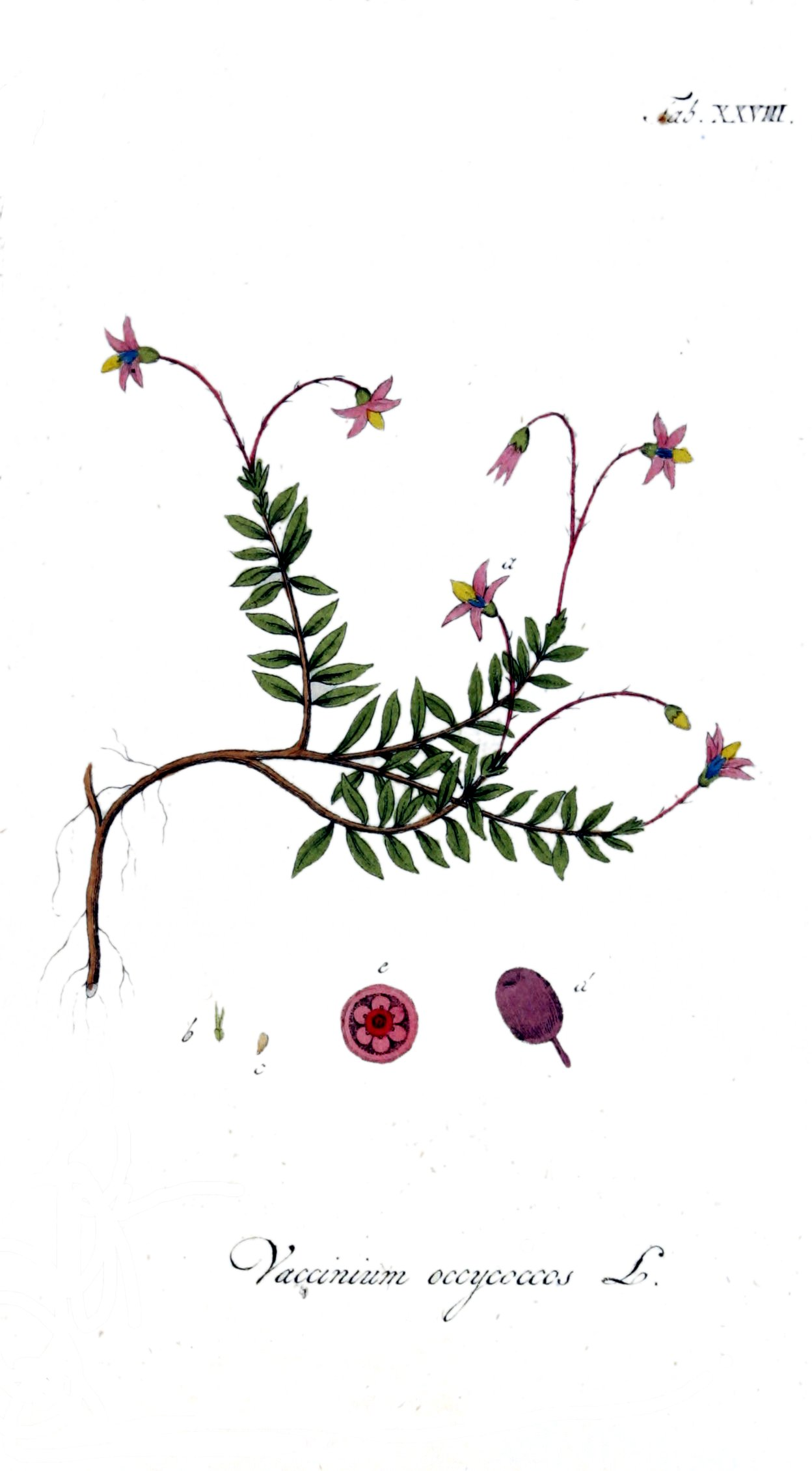
Vaccinium oxycoccos, the common cranberry, one kind of cranberry

A classification predating molecular phylogeny divides Vaccinium into subgenera and several sections:

Subgenus Oxycoccus
The cranberries, with slender, trailing, wiry non-woody shoots and strongly reflexed flower petals. Some botanists treat Oxycoccus as a distinct genus.

- Sect. Oxycoccus
  - Vaccinium macrocarpon – American cranberry
  - Vaccinium oxycoccos – common cranberry
  - Vaccinium microcarpum – small bog cranberry
- Sect. Oxycoccoides
  - Vaccinium erythrocarpum – southern mountain cranberry
  - Vaccinium japonicum – mountain blueberry

Subgenus Vaccinium
All the other species, with thicker, upright woody shoots and bell-shaped flowers.

- Sect. Batodendron
  - Vaccinium arboreum – sparkleberry
  - Vaccinium crassifolium – creeping blueberry
- Sect. Brachyceratium
  - Vaccinium dependens
- Sect. Bracteata
  - Vaccinium acrobracteatum
  - Vaccinium barandanum
  - Vaccinium bracteatum
  - Vaccinium coriaceum
  - Vaccinium cornigerum
  - Vaccinium cruentum
  - Vaccinium hooglandii
  - Vaccinium horizontale
  - Vaccinium laurifolium
  - Vaccinium lucidum
  - Vaccinium myrtoides
  - Vaccinium phillyreoides
  - Vaccinium reticulatovenosum
  - Vaccinium sparsum
  - Vaccinium varingifolium
- Sect. Ciliata
  - Vaccinium ciliatum
  - Vaccinium oldhamii - Japanese blueberry
- Sect. Cinctosandra
  - Vaccinium exul
- Sect. Conchophyllum
  - Vaccinium corymbodendron
  - Vaccinium delavayi
  - Vaccinium emarginatum
  - Vaccinium griffithianum
  - Vaccinium moupinense – Himalayan blueberry
  - Vaccinium neilgherrense
  - Vaccinium nummularia
  - Vaccinium retusum
- Sect. Cyanococcus – typical North American blueberries
  - Vaccinium angustifolium – lowbush blueberry - also known as Vaccinium stenophyllum
  - Vaccinium boreale – northern blueberry
  - Vaccinium caesariense – New Jersey blueberry
  - Vaccinium corymbosum – highbush blueberry
  - Vaccinium darrowii – evergreen blueberry
  - Vaccinium elliottii – Elliott's blueberry
  - Vaccinium formosum
  - Vaccinium fuscatum – black highbush blueberry; syn. V. atrococcum
  - Vaccinium hirsutum
  - Vaccinium myrsinites – evergreen blueberry
  - Vaccinium myrtilloides – Canadian blueberry
  - Vaccinium pallidum Ait. – dryland blueberry; syn. V. vacillans Torr.
  - Vaccinium simulatum
  - Vaccinium tenellum
  - Vaccinium virgatum – rabbiteye blueberry; syn. V. ashei
- Sect. Eococcus
  - Vaccinium fragile
- Sect. Epigynium
  - Vaccinium vacciniaceum
- Sect. Galeopetalum
  - Vaccinium chunii
  - Vaccinium dunalianum
  - Vaccinium glaucoalbum
  - Vaccinium sikkimense (may not be treated as a separate species from V. glaucoalbum)
  - Vaccinium urceolatum
- Sect. Hemimyrtillus
  - Vaccinium arctostaphylos
  - Vaccinium cylindraceum
  - Vaccinium hirtum
  - Vaccinium padifolium – Madeira blueberry
  - Vaccinium smallii
- Sect. Koreanum
  - Vaccinium koreanum – Korean blueberry
- Sect. Myrtillus (including sect. Macropelma) – bilberries and relatives. Monophyly of this section has been confirmed by matK and nuclear ribosomal ITS sequence data.
  - Vaccinium calycinum Sm. – ʻōhelo kau laʻau (Hawaiʻi)
  - Vaccinium cereum (L.f.) Forst.f. – east Polynesian blueberry, Pacific blueberry
  - Vaccinium cespitosum – dwarf bilberry
  - Vaccinium deliciosum – Cascade bilberry, Cascade blueberry, blueleaf huckleberry
  - Vaccinium dentatum Sm. – ʻōhelo (Hawaiʻi)
  - Vaccinium membranaceum – square-twig blueberry, thinleaf huckleberry, tall huckleberry, big huckleberry, mountain huckleberry, "black huckleberry"
  - Vaccinium myrtillus – common bilberry, blue whortleberry, blaeberry, fraughan, hurtleberry
  - Vaccinium ovalifolium – Alaska blueberry, early blueberry, oval-leaf blueberry
  - Vaccinium parvifolium – red huckleberry
  - Vaccinium praestans – krasnika (Russian: красника), Kamchatka bilberry
  - Vaccinium reticulatum – ʻōhelo ʻai (Hawaiʻi)
  - Vaccinium scoparium – grouse whortleberry, grouseberry, littleleaf huckleberry
  - Vaccinium shastense - Shasta huckleberry
- Sect. Neurodesia
  - Vaccinium crenatum
- Sect. Oarianthe
  - Vaccinium amblyandrum
  - Vaccinium cyclopense
- Sect. Oreades
  - Vaccinium poasanum
- Sect. Pachyanthum
  - Vaccinium fissiflorum
- Sect. Polycodium
  - Vaccinium stamineum L. – deerberry; syn. V. caesium (eastern North America)
- Sect. Pyxothamnus
  - Vaccinium chihuahuense
  - Vaccinium confertum
  - Vaccinium consanguineum
  - Vaccinium corymbodendron
  - Vaccinium floribundum
  - Vaccinium meridionale
  - Vaccinium ovatum Pursh – California huckleberry (or evergreen huckleberry) (coastal western North America).
- Sect. Vaccinium
  - Vaccinium uliginosum L. – northern (or bog) bilberry (or blueberry); syn. V. occidentale (northern North America and Eurasia)
- Sect. Vitis-idaea
  - Vaccinium vitis-idaea L. – partridgeberry, cowberry, redberry, red whortleberry, or lingonberry (northern North America and Eurasia)

== Distribution and habitat ==
The genus contains about 450 species, which are found mostly in the cooler areas of the Northern Hemisphere. However, there are tropical species from areas as widely separated as Madagascar and Hawaii. The genus is distributed worldwide except for Australia and Antarctica, but areas of great Vaccinium diversity include the montane regions of North and South America, as well as Southeast Asia. Species are still being discovered in the Andes.

Plants of this group typically require acidic soils, and as wild plants, they live in habitats such as heath, bog and acidic woodland (for example, blueberries under oaks or pines). Blueberry plants are commonly found in oak-heath forests in eastern North America. Vaccinium is found in both successional and stable sites, and it is fire-adapted in many regions, withstanding low-intensity burns, and re-sprouting from rhizomes when above-ground tissues are burned off.

== Ecology ==
The specialized structure of the anthers enables bees employing buzz pollination to remove pollen from the flowers and affect fruit set.

Vaccinium species are used as food plants by the larvae of a number of Lepidoptera (butterfly and moth) species. Berries of North American species nourish a variety of mammals and birds, notably including the grizzly bear.

== Cultivation ==
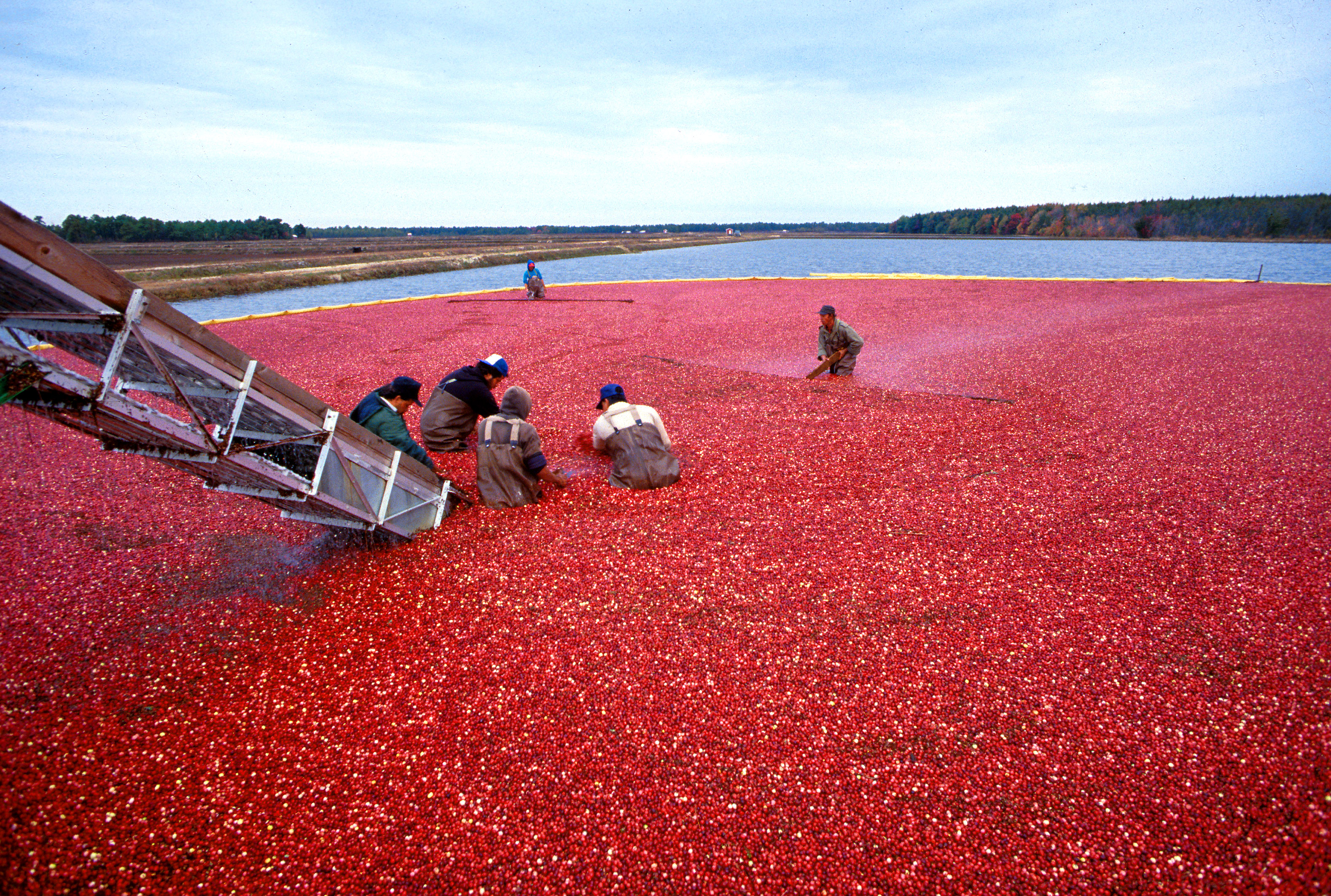
Harvesting cranberries, New Jersey, U.S.

Blueberries (sect. Cyanococcus) and cranberries (sect. Oxycoccus) are relatively newly cultivated plants and are largely unchanged from their wild relatives. Genetic breeding of blueberries began around the turn of the 20th century. It was spearheaded by Frederick Coville, who performed many cross-breeding trials and produced dozens of new blueberry cultivars. He often tested new cultivars for their flavor, claiming after a long day of tasting that "all blueberries taste the same, and all taste sour."

== See also ==
- Malea pilosa
- Gaylussacia
