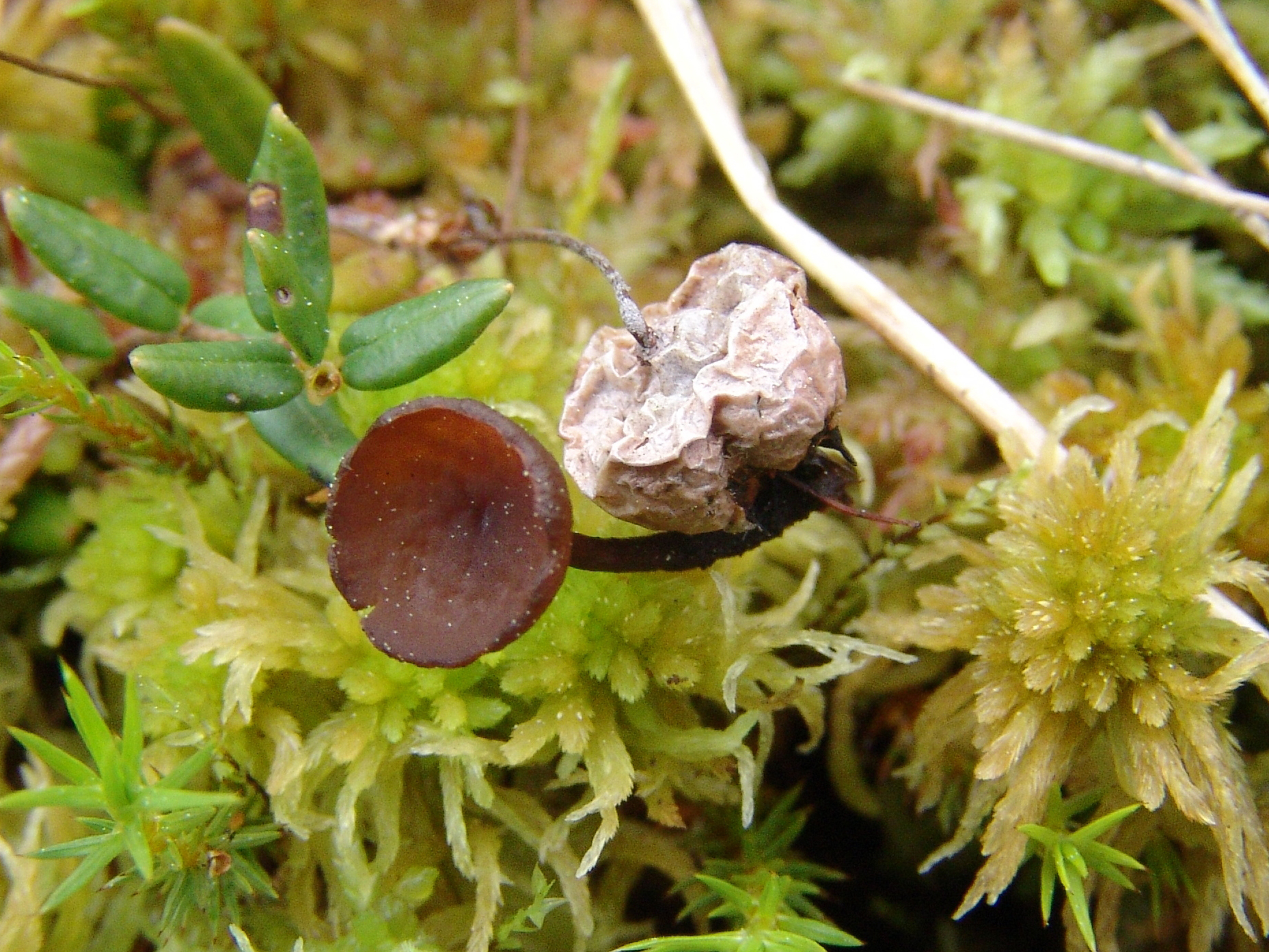

Scientific classification
- Kingdom: Fungi
- Division: Ascomycota
- Class: Leotiomycetes
- Order: Helotiales
- Family: Sclerotiniaceae
- Genus: Monilinia
- Species: M. oxycocci

Binomial name
- Monilinia oxycocci Honey

= Monilinia oxycocci =

Species of fungus

Monilinia oxycocci (Woronin) Honey, (synonym Sclerotinia oxycocci), common names cranberry cottonball, cranberry hard rot, tip blight, is a fungal infection of large cranberry (Vaccinium macrocarpon) and small cranberry (Vaccinium oxycoccos). The tips of young flowering shoots wilt before they flower. Fruit that forms on the plant can then be infected by the asexual spores traveling through the plant, causing the berries to harden, turn cottony on the inside, and dry out instead of maturing. The berries are filled with a cotton-like fungus and are generally yellowish with tan stripes or blotches at maturity, making them unmarketable. It results in important economic impacts on many cranberry marshes, particularly in Wisconsin.

== Distribution ==
Cottonball occurs on cranberry marshes in the Pacific Northwest and southeastern Canada, but is more common in Wisconsin. The disease has become much more problematic in Wisconsin since the 1970s "for reasons that are not known." Cottonball is considered the most important field rot in Wisconsin; other field rots such as early rot are rarely encountered. Typically 2 to 10% of fruit in diseased beds is infected; if left unchecked the amount can exceed 40%. Cottonball has been observed on all of the popular cranberry varieties in Wisconsin.

== Signs and symptoms ==
When young cranberry shoots become infected, they show "tip blight" symptoms: shoot tips shrivel and a tan discoloration spreads from the tip of the shoot down the stem and into leaves. Cottonball tip blight differs from other shoot diebacks, in that tan V- or U-shaped lesions can be observed centered on the leaf midvein. Also, white, powdery conidia (asexual spores) appear on diseased shoots just before and during bloom. Tip blight of cottonball is often inconspicuous and is easily overlooked.

Immature diseased berries show no external symptoms, but are filled with white, cotton-like fungus. While healthy berries turn red as they mature, diseased berries may acquire a red blush but are generally yellowish with tan stripes or blotches. Diseased fruit are unfit for fresh or processing markets.

Dried-up remains of diseased fruit contain sclerotia and are commonly called "mummies". The "mummies" are roughly spherical and about 1/2 inch in diameter. In the spring, tan or brown mushroom-like structures (apothecia) about 1–2 inches tall grow from the mummies. These "'[m]ummies' and apothecia are difficult to spot."

== Disease cycle ==
Monilinia species attack various Ericaceae hosts. M. oxycocci on cranberry exhibits a disease cycle similar to other species and is characterized by two distinct phases: infection of shoots (tip blight), and secondary infection of flowers (leading to fruit rot). Fruit rot only results from the infection of flowers during bloom.

About the time of budbreak in the spring, apothecia develop from overwintered pseudosclerotia—the hardened, dried-out "mummified" remains of previously diseased fruit. Mummies are typically spherical and approximately 0.5 inches in diameter. Apothecia are generally 1 to 2 inches tall. These apothecia discharge ascospores over 10–14 days. Ascospores infect succulent young developing shoots (0.5 – 1.5 inches long), causing tip blight. This is the primary infection. Come bloom (about 3–4 weeks after primary infection), conidia are produced on the infected shoots and are dispersed to infect open flowers. Conidia borne either by wind or insect deposition may land on the flower stigma, germinate, grow down the style, and colonize the ovary. This is the secondary infection.

Within the ovary, fungal mycelia form a white cottony mass in each of the four locules, or fruit seed cavities, and grow into the fleshy fruit tissue. The infected berry itself remains firm, categorizing this type of rot as a hard rot (a soft rot is characterized by total tissue maceration and seepage). Affected berries remain yellowish-tan and in some cases turning brown, instead of coloring normally. Eventually, the fungus consumes the fruit pericarp and a hard black pseudosclerotium (mummy) develops from 25–50% of the diseased fruit. Mature pseudosclerotia often float and may be dispersed by harvest or cold protection floods. The fungus will overwinter in these mummies—which can be difficult to detect—at or near the soil surface. Pseudosclerotia remain viable for several years. Wet conditions in the spring stimulate apothecia growth and the cycle moves forward. Berries without pseudosclerotia decompose by the next spring.

A study in 2007 observed that conidia germinate on anthers, nectaries, petals, and stigmata, but not styles. The stigma was the only flower part penetrated by the fungus, but no specialized infection structures were noted, concluding that the stigma is the sole floral infection court for conidia of M. oxycocci.

== Environment ==
Fruit rot fungi thrive in extended wet conditions. It has been suggested that incidence of disease is greatest when there are prolonged wet periods during the maturing apothecia phase, rainy spells during bloom, and an abundance of mummified berries. Ditches where dense moss is growing and areas where recently applied sand is saturated for an extended time are ideal sites for more severe cases of tip blight.

Further studies have shown that the temperature of the duff and upper canopy within the bed, in addition to relative humidity, correlate best with the constant presence of airborne ascospores during peak dispersal time. These variables (temperature and moisture) along with wind speed are factors in the constant presence of airborne conidia during peak dispersal time. The intensity of conidia showers directly relates to the percentage of bloom and shoots with primary infection symptoms. However, no clear pattern of environmental events has been noted to account for the initiation of peak spore dispersal periods.

== Management ==
Many cottonball-infected fruit and mummies are removed during harvest. Because they float, some growers have found that reflooding beds after harvest is a good way to remove cottonball mummies and other pests. Good drainage is another important tool for limiting the spread of the disease by limiting the ability of spores to travel in water on the soil surface.

Fungicides have been used since the 1990s to control cottonball. Orbit (propiconazole) is the most effective fungicide available. Spray recommendations depend on the previous year's disease pressure. "If disease pressure was low to moderate (fewer than 15% of berries infected), two fungicide applications are recommended: one at 10 – 20% bloom and again 7 – 10 days later. If disease pressure was high in the previous year (greater than 15% of berries infected), two additional fungicide applications are recommended: one when about half the shoots have started to elongate and the second 7 – 10 days later." Experiments have shown that bloom sprays are especially important, and unless disease pressure is high, spraying during shoot elongation appears to be unnecessary. No negative impacts on bees, yield, berry size, or berry color have been observed when Orbit was applied during bloom. Control of cottonball is the main reason for fungicide use in cranberry production. There are other fungicides that have been used in the management of the disease but some can be extremely toxic to fish, which is important to note specially due to the amount of runoff and drainage water that the harvest requires.

== Economic impact ==
Typically 2–10% of fruit in diseased beds is infected and becomes unmarketable. Wisconsin is the largest producer of cranberries in the United States (it is Wisconsin's state fruit). In 2010, Wisconsin produced 3.96 million barrels of cranberries, representing nearly 60% of the nation's crop. Cranberries contribute nearly $300 million annually in Wisconsin, and support approximately 3,400 jobs in the state. Even relatively small amounts of cottonball infections can have a dramatic effect on producers' incomes.
