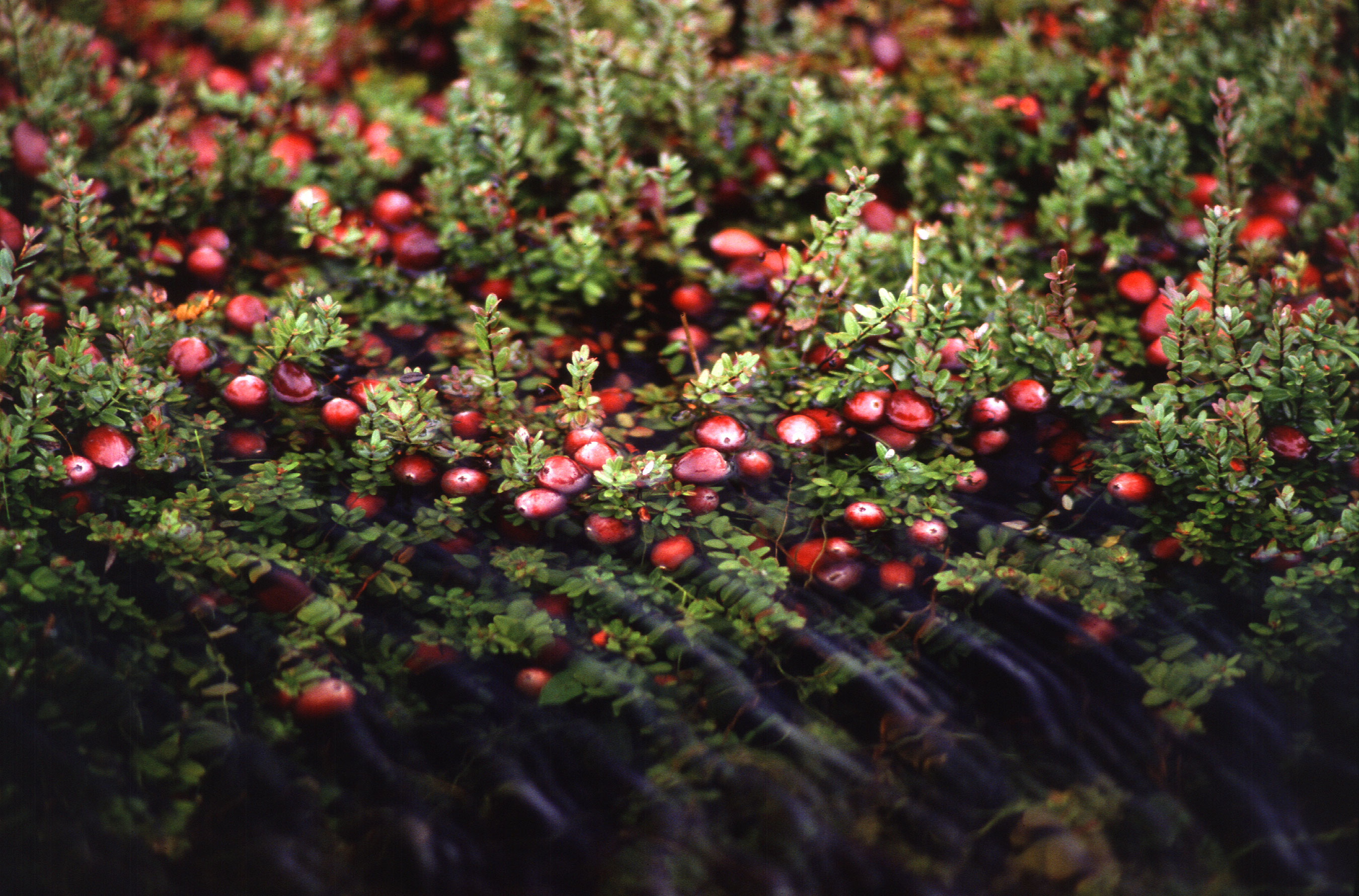
- Cranberry bush with fruit partially submerged in bog

Scientific classification
- Kingdom: Plantae
- Clade: Tracheophytes
- Clade: Angiosperms
- Clade: Eudicots
- Clade: Asterids
- Order: Ericales
- Family: Ericaceae
- Genus: Vaccinium
- Subgenus: Vaccinium subg. Oxycoccus (Hill) A.Gray

Species
- Vaccinium erythrocarpum Vaccinium japonicum Vaccinium macrocarpon Vaccinium microcarpum Vaccinium oxycoccos

= Cranberry =

Cranberries

Group of plant species bearing edible fruit

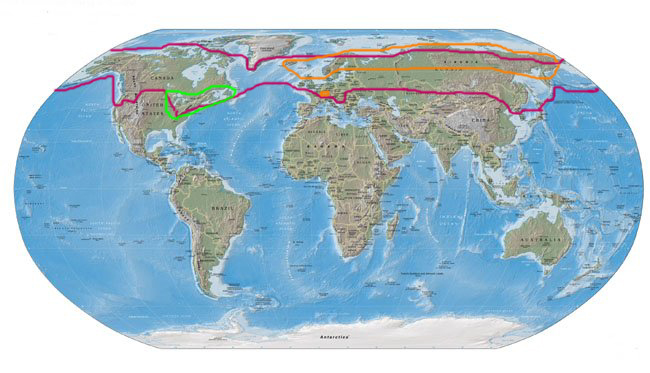
Approximate ranges of the cranberries in sect. Oxycoccus: Red: common cranberry. Orange: small cranberry. Green: American cranberry.

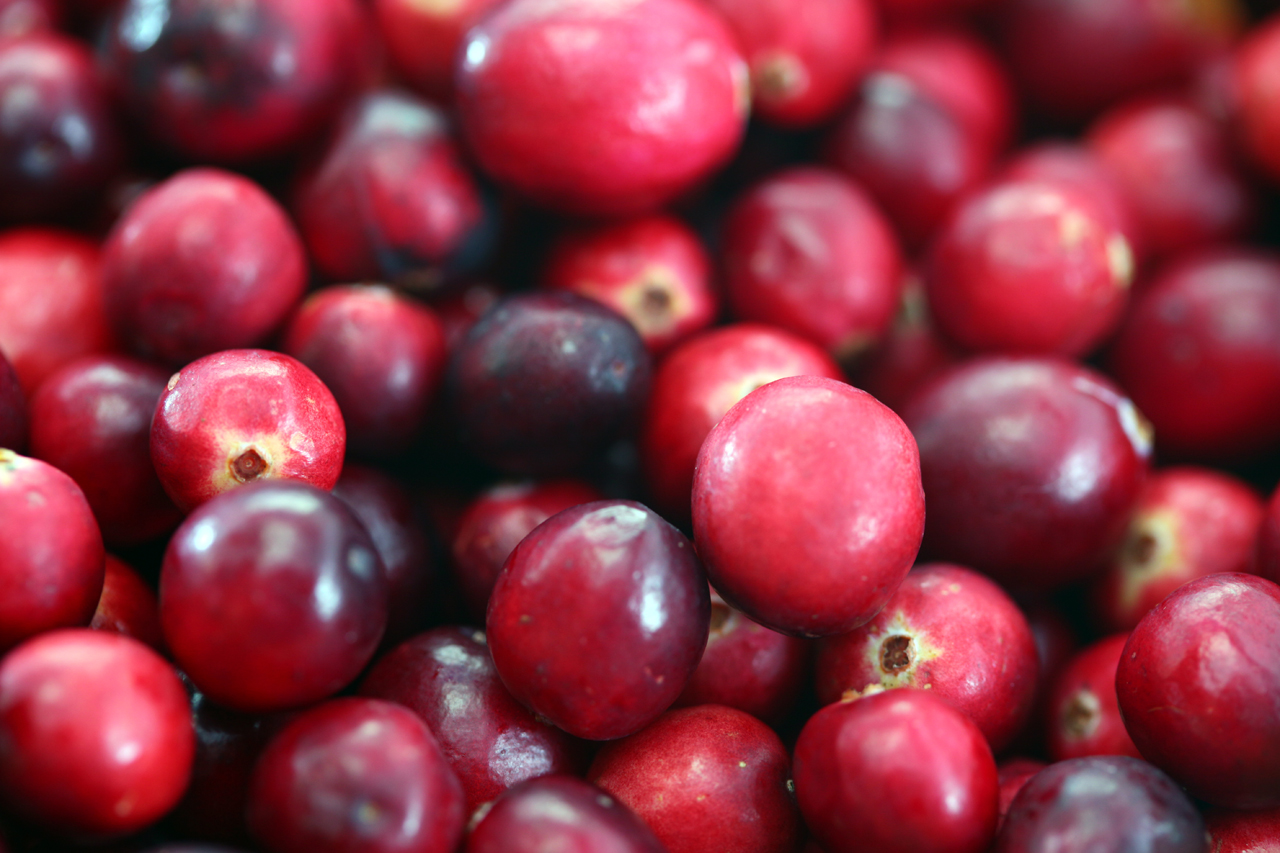
Raw cranberries

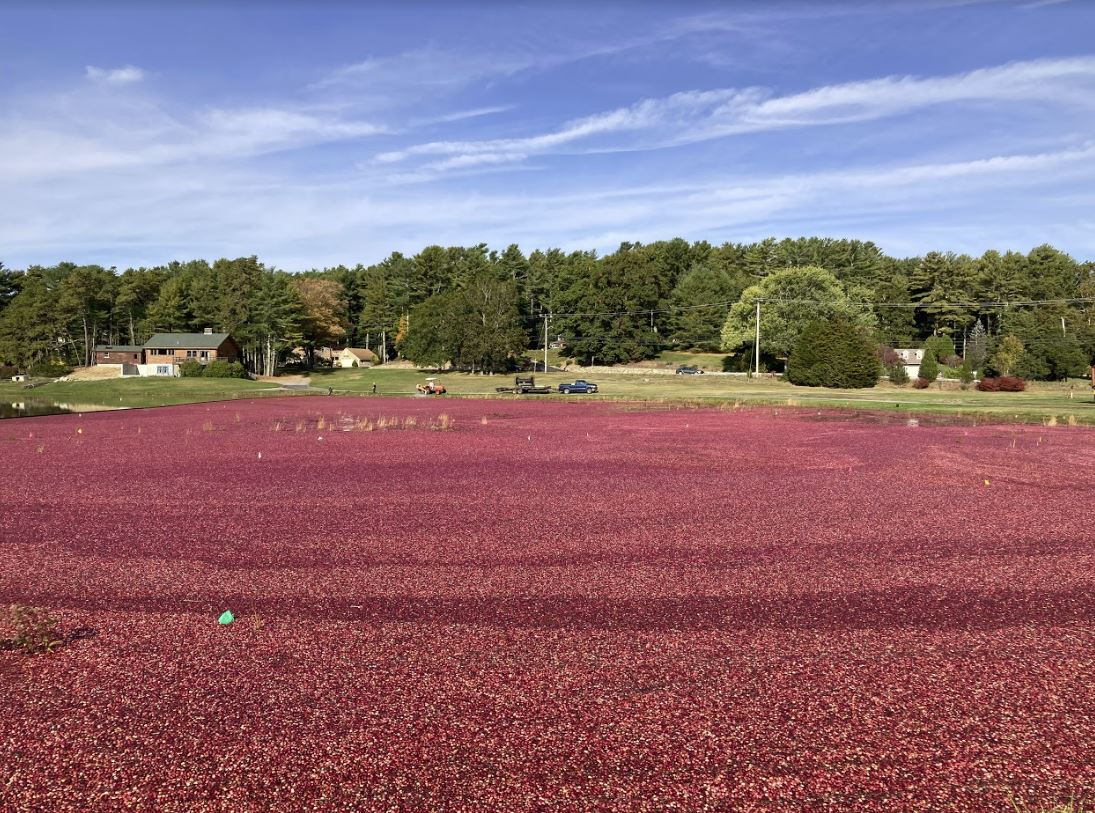
Cranberry harvest

Cranberries are a group of evergreen dwarf shrubs or trailing vines in the subgenus Oxycoccus of the genus Vaccinium. Cranberries are low, creeping shrubs or vines up to 2 meters (7 ft) long and 5 to 20 centimeters (2 to 8 in) in height; they have slender stems that are not thickly woody and have small evergreen leaves. The flowers are dark pink. The fruit is a berry that is larger than the leaves of the plant; it is initially light green, turning red when ripe. The raw berry is edible and has a tart taste due to the low sugar content and high acidity.

In Britain, cranberry may refer to the native species Vaccinium oxycoccos, while in North America, it may refer to V. macrocarpon. The former is cultivated in central and northern Europe, while the latter is cultivated throughout the northern United States, Canada, and Chile. In 2020, the U.S., Canada, and Chile accounted for 97% of the world production of cranberries. Most cranberries are processed into products such as juice, sauce, jam, and sweetened dried cranberries, with the remainder sold fresh to consumers. Cranberry sauce is a traditional accompaniment to turkey at Christmas and Thanksgiving dinners in the U.S. and Canada, and at Christmas dinners in the United Kingdom.

== Description ==
Cranberries are low, creeping shrubs or vines up to 2 meters (7 ft) long and 5 to 20 centimeters (2 to 8 in) in height; they have slender, wiry stems that are not thickly woody and have small evergreen leaves. The flowers are dark pink, with very distinct reflexed petals, leaving the style and stamens fully exposed and pointing forward. They are pollinated by bees. The fruit is a berry that is larger than the leaves of the plant; it is initially light green, turning red when ripe. It has an acidic taste which usually overwhelms its sweetness.

=== Similar species ===
Cranberries are related to bilberries, blueberries, and huckleberries, all in Vaccinium subgenus Vaccinium. These differ in having bell-shaped flowers, petals that are not reflexed, and woodier stems, forming taller shrubs.

== Taxonomy ==
In some methods of classification, Oxycoccus is regarded as a genus in its own right.

=== Species ===
There are 4–5 species of cranberry, classified by subgenus:

==== Subgenus Oxycoccus ====
Image	Name	Description	Distribution
	Vaccinium oxycoccos or Oxycoccus palustris (common cranberry, northern cranberry or cranberry)	It has small 5–10 mm (1/4–3/8 in) leaves, with an inrolled margin. The flowers are dark pink, with a purple central spike, produced on finely hairy stalks. The fruit is a small pale pink to red berry, with a refreshing sharp acidic flavor.	Widespread throughout the cool temperate Northern Hemisphere, including northern Europe, northern Asia, and northern North America.
	Vaccinium microcarpum or Oxycoccus microcarpus (small cranberry)	It is highly similar to V. oxycoccos, differing in the leaves being more triangular, and the flower stems hairless; additionally, their stems can also be smaller and produce a smaller number of flowers than V. ocycoccos. They also differ in the fact that their leaves can be smaller in size, even though the main difference is their triangular shape. Some botanists include it within V. oxycoccos.	Occurs in northern North America, northern Europe and northern Asia.
	Vaccinium macrocarpon or Oxycoccus macrocarpus (large cranberry, American cranberry, bearberry)	It differs from V. oxycoccos in the leaves being larger, 10–20 mm (3/8–3/4 in) long, and flat, and in the slightly apple-like taste of the berries.	Native to northern North America across Canada, and eastern United States, south to North Carolina at high altitudes).

==== Subgenus Oxycoccus, sect. Oxycoccoides ====
Image	Name	Description	Distribution
	Vaccinium erythrocarpum or Oxycarpus erythrocarpus (southern mountain cranberry, bearberry)	This species differs significantly from sect. oxycoccus cranberries particularly in growth habit. A deciduous shrub, their flowers are borne in June of a tubular shape with reflexed petals consistent with the rest of the subgenera. They produce edible scarlet berries described as being seemingly translucent.	Native to southeastern United States at high altitudes in the southern Appalachian Mountains
	Vaccinium japonicum	They are typically found in forests and thickets within alpine areas between 1,000–2,600 metres (3,300–8,500 ft).	Native to Southern China, Taiwan, the Japanese archipelago, and the Korean Peninsula

=== Etymology ===
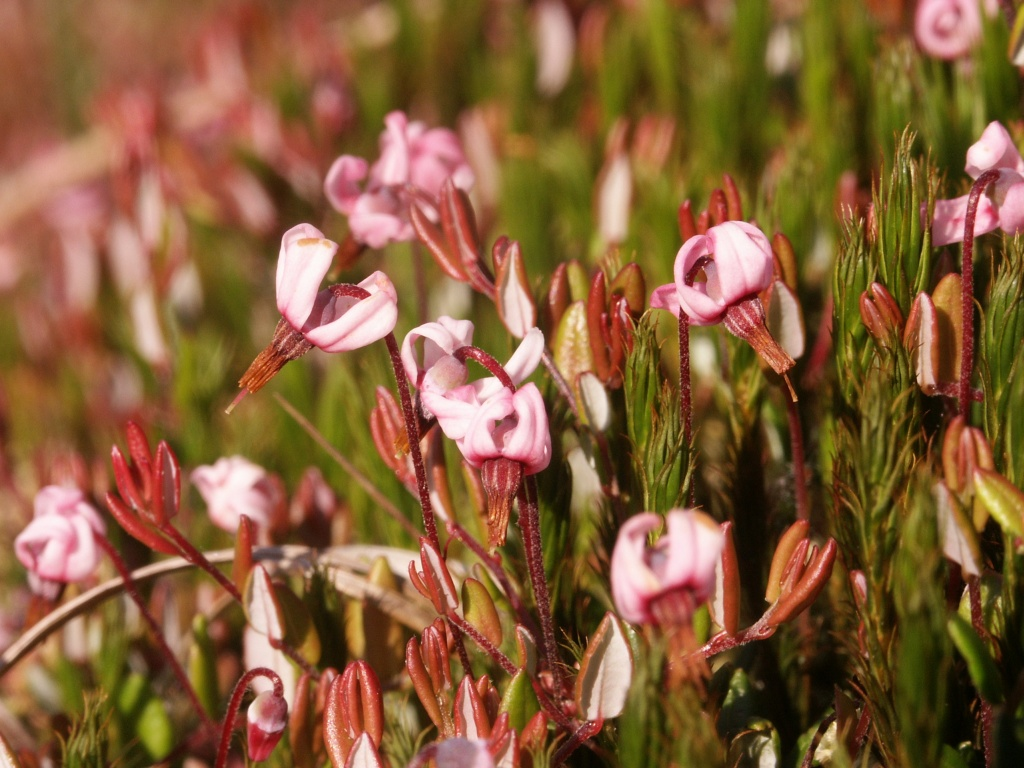
Vaccinium oxycoccos flowers

The name cranberry derives from the Middle Low German kraanbere (English translation, craneberry), first named as cranberry in English by the missionary John Eliot in 1647. Around 1694, German and Dutch colonists in New England used the word, cranberry, to represent the expanding flower, stem, calyx, and petals resembling the neck, head, and bill of a crane. The traditional English name for the plant more common in Europe, Vaccinium oxycoccos, fenberry, originated from plants with small red berries found growing in fen (marsh) lands of England.

== Distribution and habitat ==
Cranberries can be found in acidic bogs throughout the cooler regions of the Northern Hemisphere.

== Cultivation ==
Cranberry gathering near Cape Cod, Massachusetts

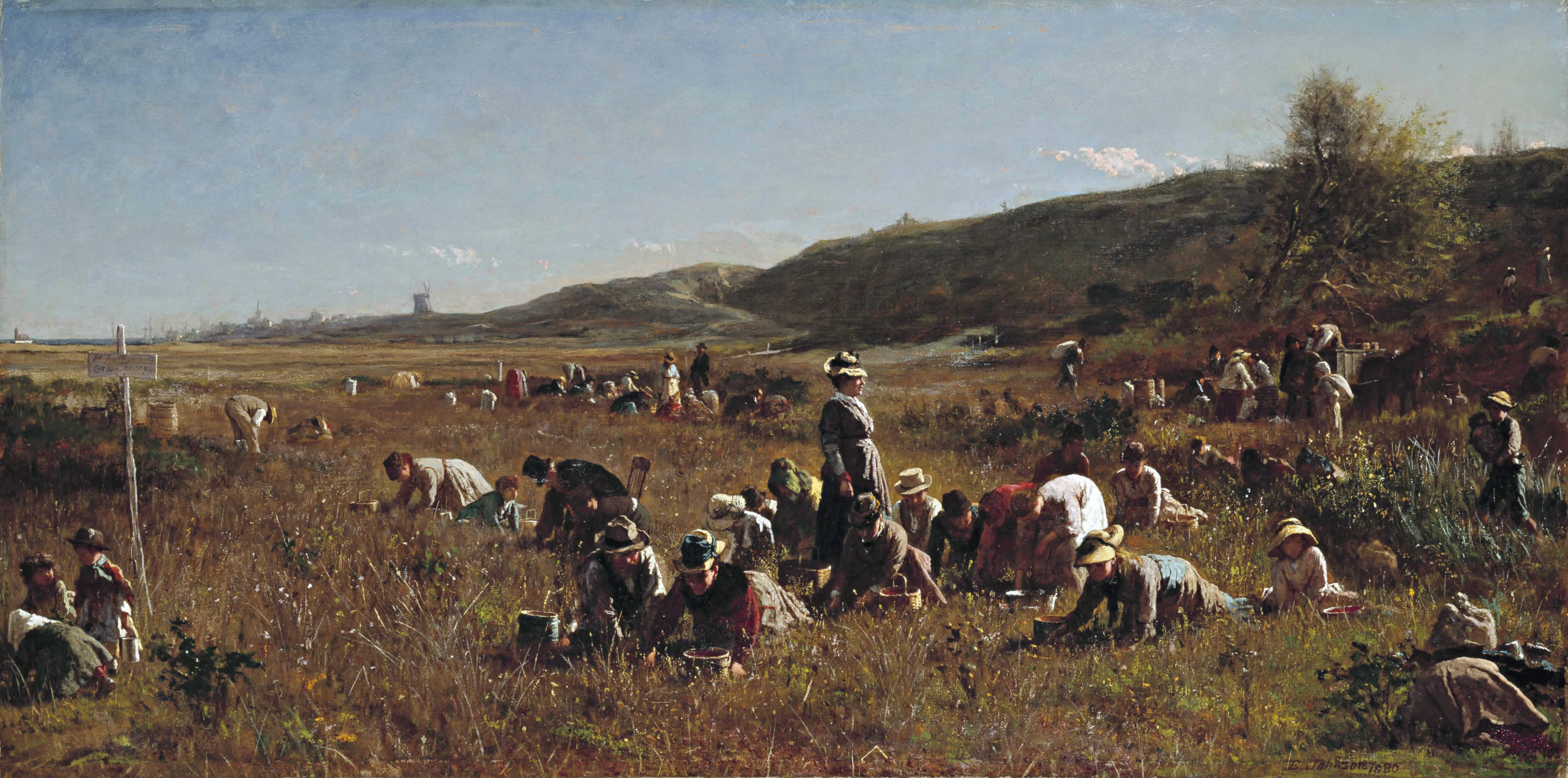
1880 in Nantucket, by Eastman Johnson

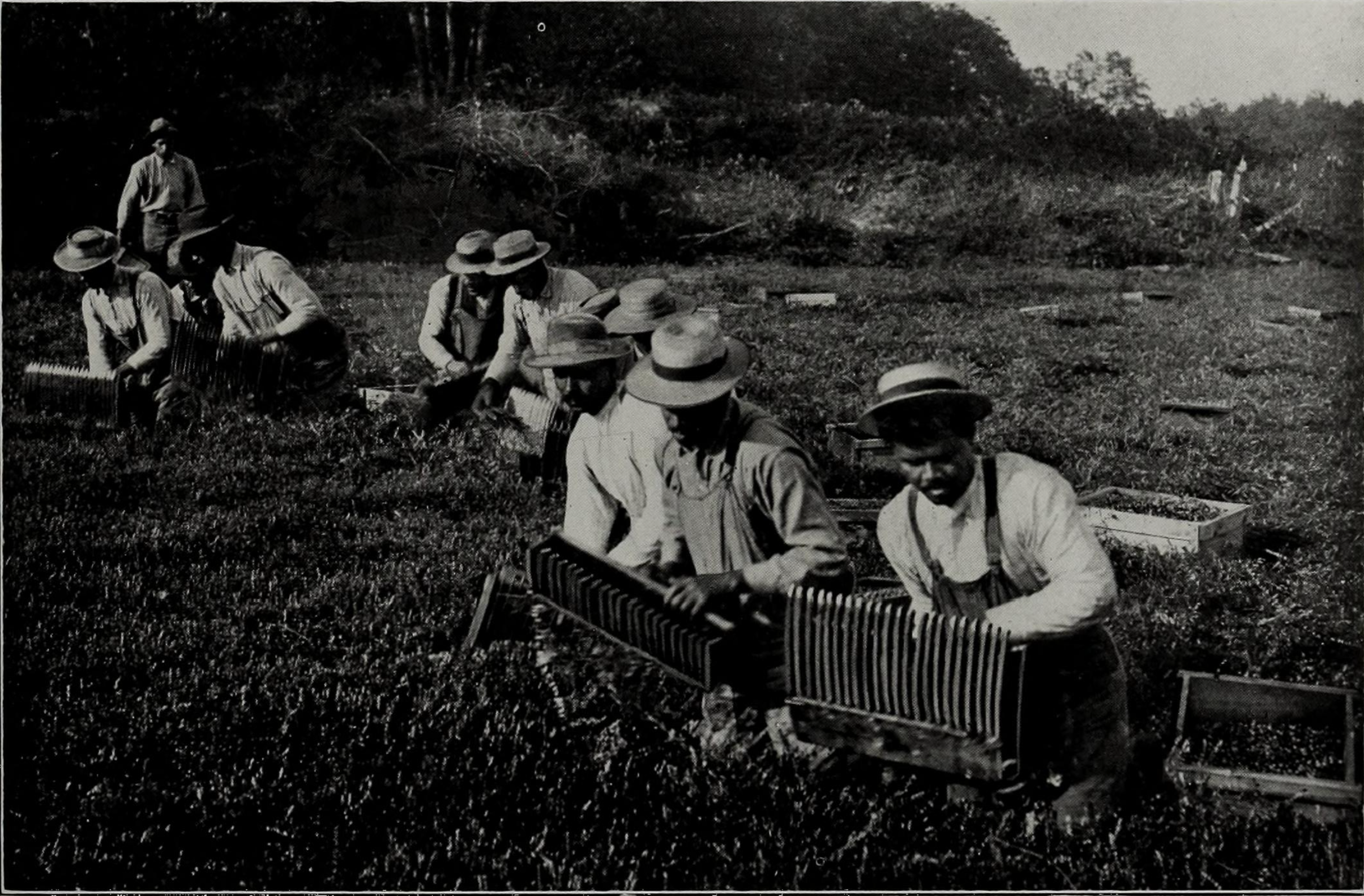
Early 20th century

American Revolutionary War veteran Henry Hall first cultivated cranberries in the Cape Cod town of Dennis around 1816. In the 1820s, Hall was shipping cranberries to New York City and Boston from which shipments were also sent to Europe. In 1843, Eli Howes planted his own crop of cranberries on Cape Cod, using the "Howes" variety. In 1847, Cyrus Cahoon planted a crop of "Early Black" variety near Pleasant Lake, Harwich, Massachusetts.

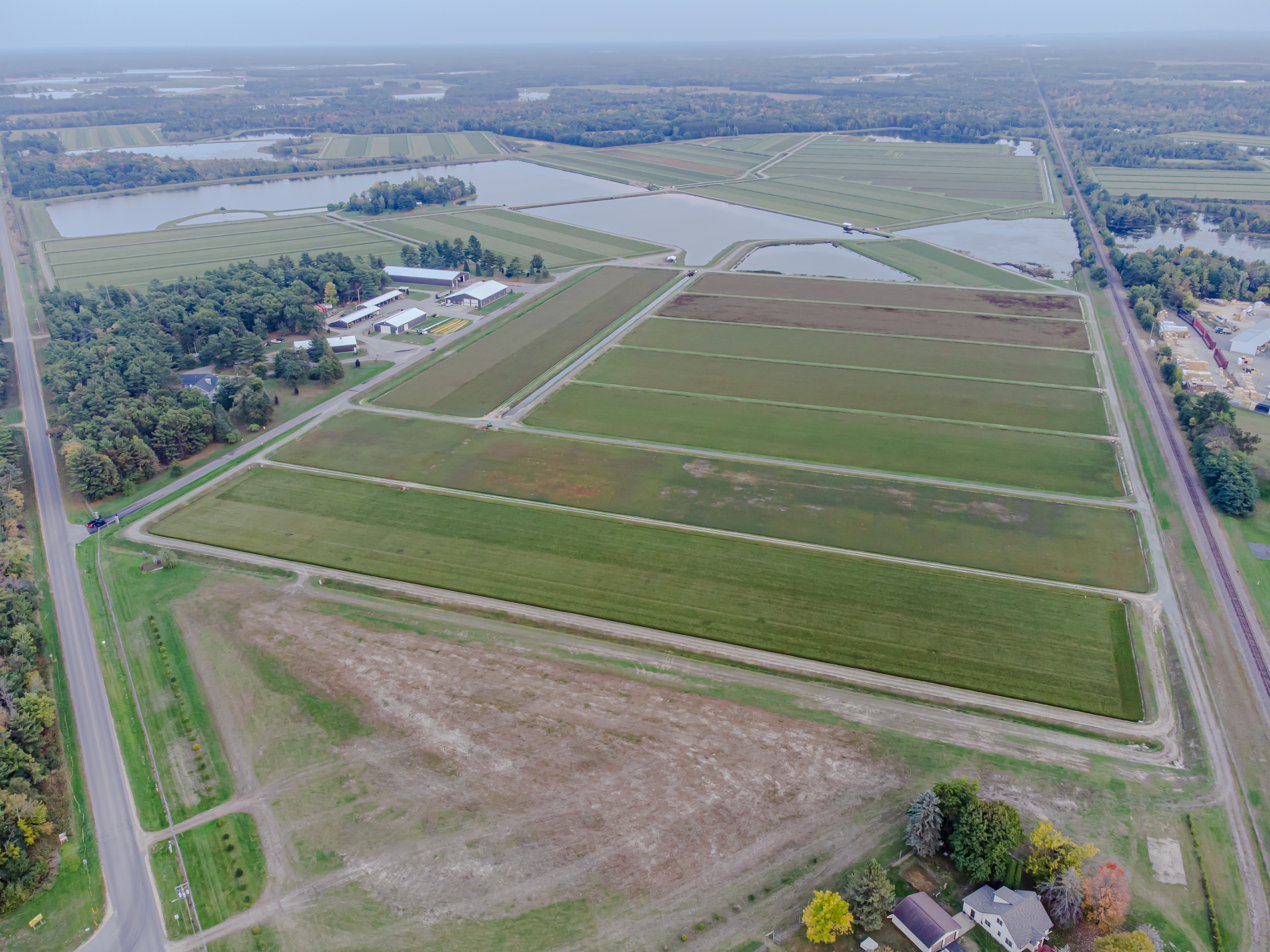
Cranberry farm

By 1900, 8,700 hectares (21,500 acres) were under cultivation in the New England region. In 2021, the total output of cranberries harvested in the United States was 360,000 metric tons (790 million pounds), with Wisconsin as the largest state producer (59% of total), followed by Massachusetts, New Jersey, and Oregon. Cranberries have had two major breeding events. The first occurred in the 1920s, with aims to create a crop that was more insect-resistant, specifically to blunt-nosed leafhopper (Limotettix vaccinii), the vector of a phytoplasma that causes cranberry false blossom disease. This resulted in cultivars such as "Stevens" and "Franklin". As such, cultivars like "Howes" tend to be more susceptible to insects than "Stevens". However, with the introduction of many broad-spectrum pesticides in the 1940s and 1950s, breeders eventually stopped breeding for pest resistance. Instead, beginning in the 1980s, cranberries were bred for high-yielding varieties, leading to cultivars such as "Crimson Queen" and "Mullica Queen". Many of these varieties were spearheaded and bred by Dr. Nicholi Vorsa of Rutgers University. In more recent years, there have been heavier restrictions on pesticides due to environmental safety concerns, leading to a greater emphasis on high yield, high resistance varieties.

=== Geography and bog method ===
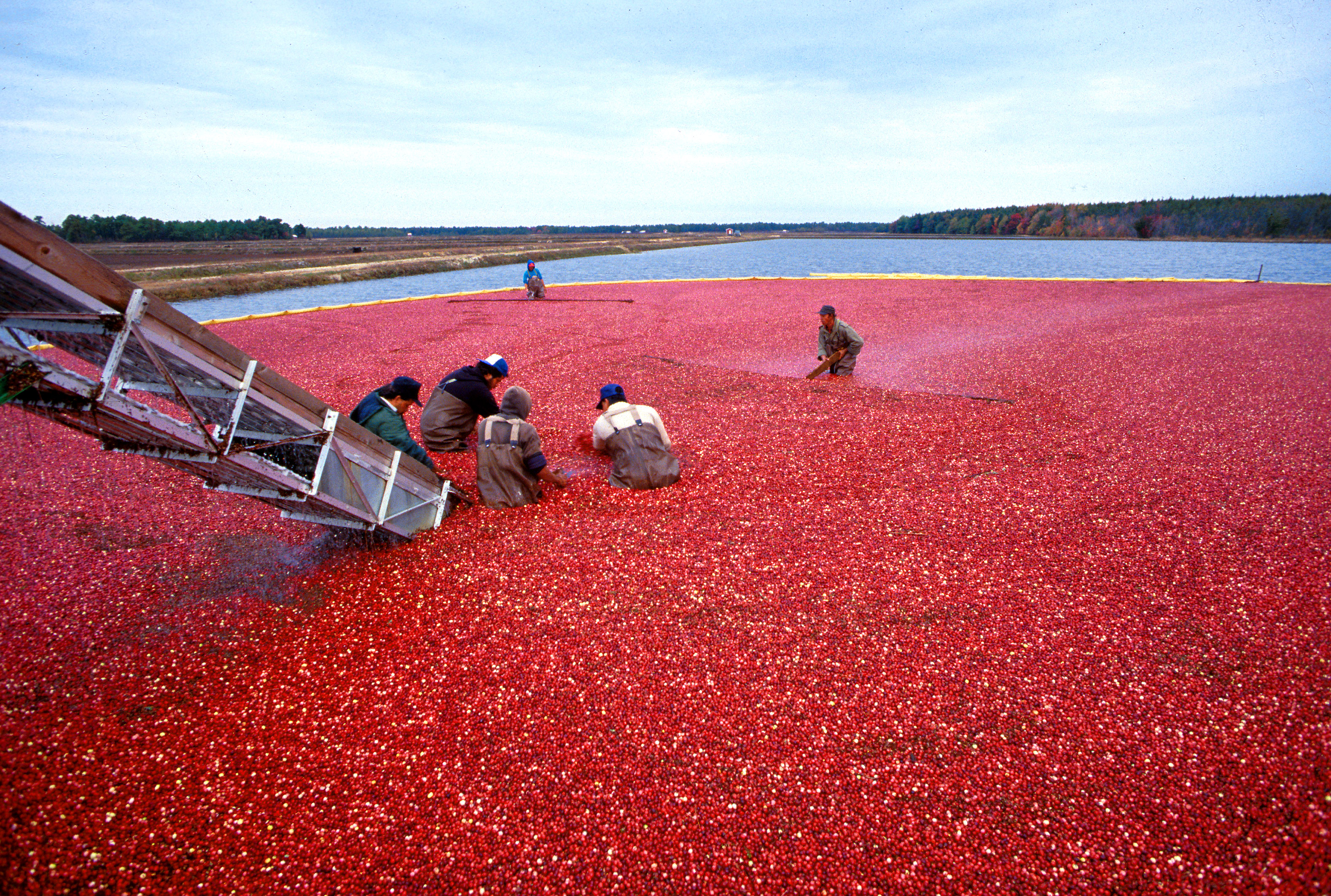
Cranberry harvest

Historically, cranberry beds were constructed in wetlands. Today's cranberry beds are constructed in upland areas with a shallow water table. The topsoil is scraped off to form dykes around the bed perimeter. Clean sand is hauled in and spread to a depth of 10 to 20 centimeters (4 to 8 in). The surface is laser leveled flat to provide even drainage. Beds are frequently drained with socked tile in addition to the perimeter ditch. In addition to making it possible to hold water, the dykes allow equipment to service the beds without driving on the vines. Irrigation equipment is installed in the bed to provide irrigation for vine growth and for spring and autumn frost protection.

A common misconception about cranberry production is that the beds remain flooded throughout the year. During the growing season cranberry beds are not flooded, but are irrigated regularly to maintain soil moisture. Beds are flooded in the autumn to facilitate harvest and again during the winter to protect against low temperatures. In cold climates like Wisconsin, New England, and eastern Canada, the winter flood typically freezes into ice, while in warmer climates the water remains liquid. When ice forms on the beds, trucks can be driven onto the ice to spread a thin layer of sand to control pests and rejuvenate the vines. Sanding is done every three to five years.

=== Propagation ===
Cranberry vines are propagated by moving vines from an established bed. The vines are spread on the surface of the sand of the new bed and pushed into the sand with a blunt disk. The vines are watered frequently during the first few weeks until roots form and new shoots grow. Beds are given frequent, light application of nitrogen fertilizer during the first year. The cost of renovating cranberry beds is estimated to be between $74,000 and $124,000 per hectare ($30,000 and $50,000 per acre).

=== Ripening and harvest ===
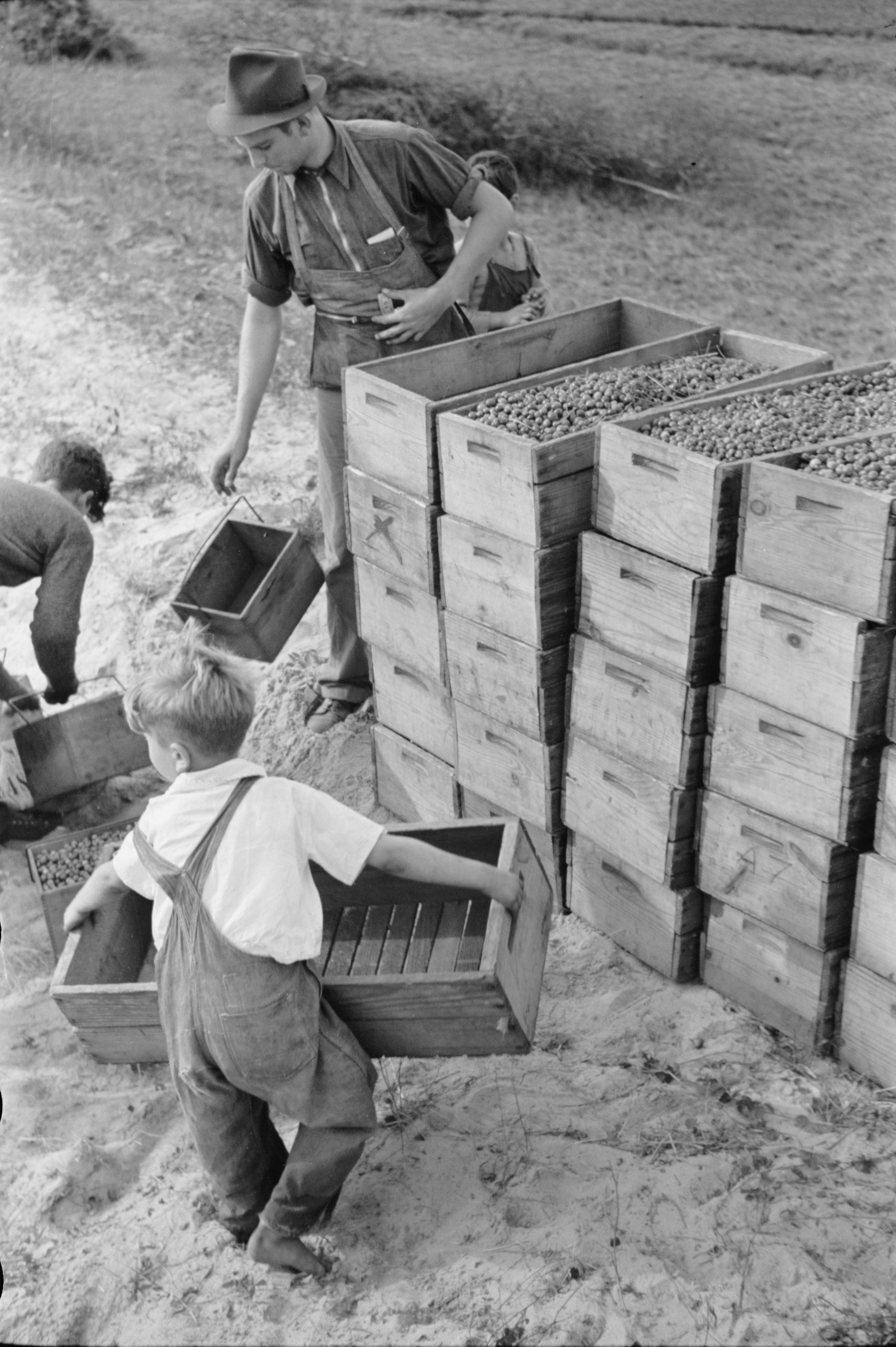
Arthur Rothstein, Child Labor, Cranberry Bog, 1939. Brooklyn Museum

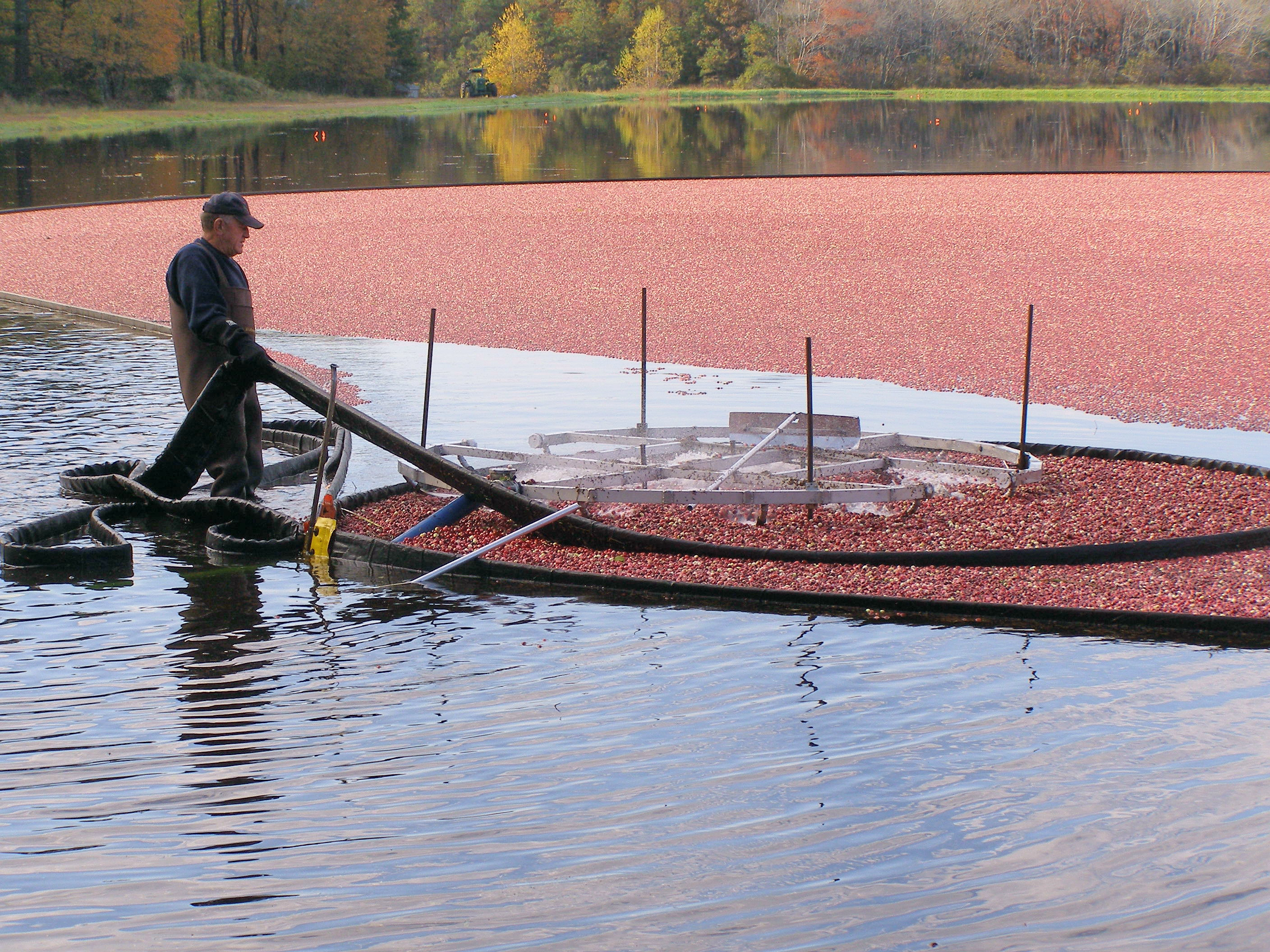
Cranberry harvest (wet-picking)

Cranberries are harvested in the fall when the fruit takes on its distinctive deep red color, and most ideally after the first frost. This is usually in September through the first part of November. Berries that receive sun turn a deep red when fully ripe, while those that do not fully mature are a pale pink or white color. To harvest cranberries, the beds are flooded with 15 to 20 centimeters (6 to 8 in) of water above the vines. A harvester is driven through the beds to remove the fruit from the vines. Since the 1960s, water reel type harvesters have been used. Harvested cranberries float in the water and can be corralled into a corner of the bed and conveyed or pumped from the bed. From the farm, cranberries are taken to receiving stations where they are cleaned, sorted, and stored prior to packaging or processing. While cranberries are harvested when they take on their deep red color, they can also be harvested beforehand when they are still white, which is how white cranberry juice is made. Yields are lower on beds harvested early and the early flooding tends to damage vines, but not severely. Vines can also be trained through dry picking to help avoid damage in subsequent harvests.

Although most cranberries are wet-picked as described above, 5–10% of the US crop is still dry-picked. This entails higher labor costs and lower yield, but dry-picked berries are less bruised and can be sold as fresh fruit instead of having to be immediately frozen or processed. Originally performed with two-handed comb scoops, dry picking is today accomplished by motorized, walk-behind harvesters which must be small enough to traverse beds without damaging the vines.

Cranberries for fresh market are stored in shallow bins or boxes with perforated or slatted bottoms, which deter decay by allowing air to circulate. Because harvest occurs in late autumn, cranberries for fresh markets are frequently stored in thick walled barns without mechanical refrigeration. Temperatures are regulated by opening and closing vents in the barn as needed. Cranberries destined for processing are usually frozen in bulk containers shortly after arriving at a receiving station.

=== Diseases ===
Diseases of cranberry include:

- Cranberry fruit rot
- Cranberry root rot
- Cranberry false blossom disease, caused by a phytoplasma that is vectored by the blunt-nosed leafhopper (Limotettix vaccinii), and prevents the plant from creating fertile flowers and thus berries.

=== Insect pests ===
Probably due to the high phenolics and plant defenses, in addition to the harsh environments that cranberries are grown under (acid, sandy soils that get flooded every year), a majority of insect pests associated with cranberries are native to the cranberry's home range of North America. The top studied insect pests of cranberries include:

- Sparganothis sulfureana (Sparganothis fruitworm), a leafrolling moth
- Acrobasis vaccinii (cranberry fruitworm), a snout moth
- Rhopobota naevana (blackheaded fireworm), a leafrolling moth
- Choristoneura parallela (spotted fireworm), a leafrolling moth

All four of these top studied insect pests are direct pests, eating the berries.

Other well studied cranberry pests include:

- Limotettix vaccinii (blunt-nosed leafhopper), a leafhopper
- Lymantria dispar (spongy moth), an invasive moth
- Dasineura oxycoccana (cranberry tipworm), a gall-forming midge
- Chrysoteuchia topiarius (cranberry girdler), a snout moth
- Anthonomus musculus (cranberry weevil), a weevil
- Systena frontalis (red-headed flea beetle), a flea beetle
- Otiorhynchus sulcatus (black vine weevil), an invasive weevil
- Anomala orientalis (oriental beetle), an invasive scarab beetle
- Phylloscelis rubra (cranberry toadbug), a planthopper

As more and more pesticides become banned due to environmental concern, there are increased resurgences of secondary pests.

=== Production ===
In 2024, world production of cranberry was 621,495 tonnes, with the United States (65%) and Canada (34%) together accounting for 99% of the total. Wisconsin (59% of US production) and Quebec (60% of Canadian production) are the largest producers of cranberries in the two countries, respectively. Cranberries are also a major commercial crop in Massachusetts, New Jersey, Oregon, and Washington, as well as in the Canadian province of British Columbia (33% of Canadian production).

Production of cranberries

Cranberry yield

== Possible safety concerns ==
The anticoagulant effects of warfarin may be increased by consuming cranberry juice, resulting in adverse effects such as increased incidence of bleeding and bruising. Other safety concerns from consuming large quantities of cranberry juice or using cranberry supplements include potential for nausea, and increasing stomach inflammation, sugar intake or kidney stone formation.

== Uses ==
=== Nutrition ===
Cranberries, raw
Nutritional value per 100 g (3.5 oz)
- Energy: 46 kcal (190 kJ)
- Carbohydrates: 12 g
- Sugars: 4.3 g
- Dietary fiber: 3.6 g
- Fat: 0.1 g
- Protein: 0.5 g
Vitamins and minerals
Vitamins	Quantity %DV^{†}
Thiamine (B1)	1% 0.012 mg
Riboflavin (B2)	2% 0.02 mg
Niacin (B3)	1% 0.101 mg
Pantothenic acid (B5)	6% 0.295 mg
Vitamin B6	3% 0.057 mg
Folate (B9)	0% 1 μg
Vitamin C	16% 14 mg
Vitamin E	9% 1.3 mg
Vitamin K	4% 5 μg
Minerals	Quantity %DV^{†}
Calcium	1% 8 mg
Iron	1% 0.2 mg
Magnesium	1% 6 mg
Manganese	16% 0.36 mg
Phosphorus	1% 11 mg
Potassium	3% 80 mg
Sodium	0% 2 mg
Zinc	1% 0.1 mg
- Other constituents: Quantity
- Water: 87 g
- Link to USDA Database entry
- ^{†}Percentages estimated using US recommendations for adults, except for potassium, which is estimated based on expert recommendation from the National Academies.

Raw cranberries are 87% water, 12% carbohydrates, and contain negligible protein and fat (table). In a reference amount of 100 g (3.5 oz), raw cranberries supply 46 calories and moderate levels of vitamin C, dietary fiber, and the dietary mineral manganese (each with 16% of its Daily Value), while other micronutrients are low in content (table).

Dried cranberries are commonly sweetened by adding sucrose with up to 17 times of their natural sugar content. The drying process also eliminates vitamin C content.

=== History ===
In North America, the Narragansett people of the Algonquian nation in the regions of New England appeared to be using cranberries in pemmican for food and for dye. Calling the red berries sasemineash, the Narragansett people may have introduced cranberries to colonists in Massachusetts. In 1550, James White Norwood made reference to Native Americans using cranberries, and it was the first reference to American cranberries up until this point. In James Rosier's book The Land of Virginia there is an account of Europeans coming ashore and being met with Native Americans bearing bark cups full of cranberries. In Plymouth, Massachusetts, there is a 1633 account of the husband of Mary Ring auctioning her cranberry-dyed petticoat for 16 shillings. In 1643, Roger Williams's book A Key into the Language of America described cranberries, referring to them as "bearberries" because bears ate them. In 1648, preacher John Elliott was quoted in Thomas Shepard's book Clear Sunshine of the Gospel with an account of the difficulties the Pilgrims were having in using the Indians to harvest cranberries as they preferred to hunt and fish. In 1663, the Pilgrim cookbook appears with a recipe for cranberry sauce. In 1667, New Englanders sent to King Charles ten barrels of cranberries, three barrels of codfish and some Indian corn as a means of appeasement for his anger over their local coining of the pine tree shilling minted by John Hull. In 1669, Captain Richard Cobb had a banquet in his house (to celebrate both his marriage to Mary Gorham and his election to the Convention of Assistance), serving wild turkey with sauce made from wild cranberries. In the 1672 book New England Rarities Discovered, author John Josselyn described cranberries, writing:

Sauce for the Pilgrims, cranberry or bearberry, is a small trayling [sic] plant that grows in salt marshes that are overgrown with moss. The berries are of a pale yellow color, afterwards red, as big as a cherry, some perfectly round, others oval, all of them hollow with sower [sic] astringent taste; they are ripe in August and September. They are excellent against the Scurvy. They are also good to allay the fervor of hoof diseases. The Indians and English use them mush, boyling [sic] them with sugar for sauce to eat with their meat; and it is a delicate sauce, especially with roasted mutton. Some make tarts with them as with gooseberries.

The Compleat Cook's Guide, published in 1683, made reference to cranberry juice. In 1703, cranberries were served at the Harvard University commencement dinner. In 1787, James Madison wrote Thomas Jefferson in France for background information on constitutional government to use at the Constitutional Convention. Jefferson sent back a number of books on the subject and in return asked for a gift of apples, pecans and cranberries. William Aiton, a Scottish botanist, included an entry for the cranberry in volume II of his 1789 work Hortus Kewensis. He notes that Vaccinium macrocarpon (American cranberry) was cultivated by James Gordon in 1760. In 1796, cranberries were served at the first celebration of the landing of the Pilgrims, and Amelia Simmons (an American orphan) wrote a book entitled American Cookery which contained a recipe for cranberry tarts.

=== Products ===
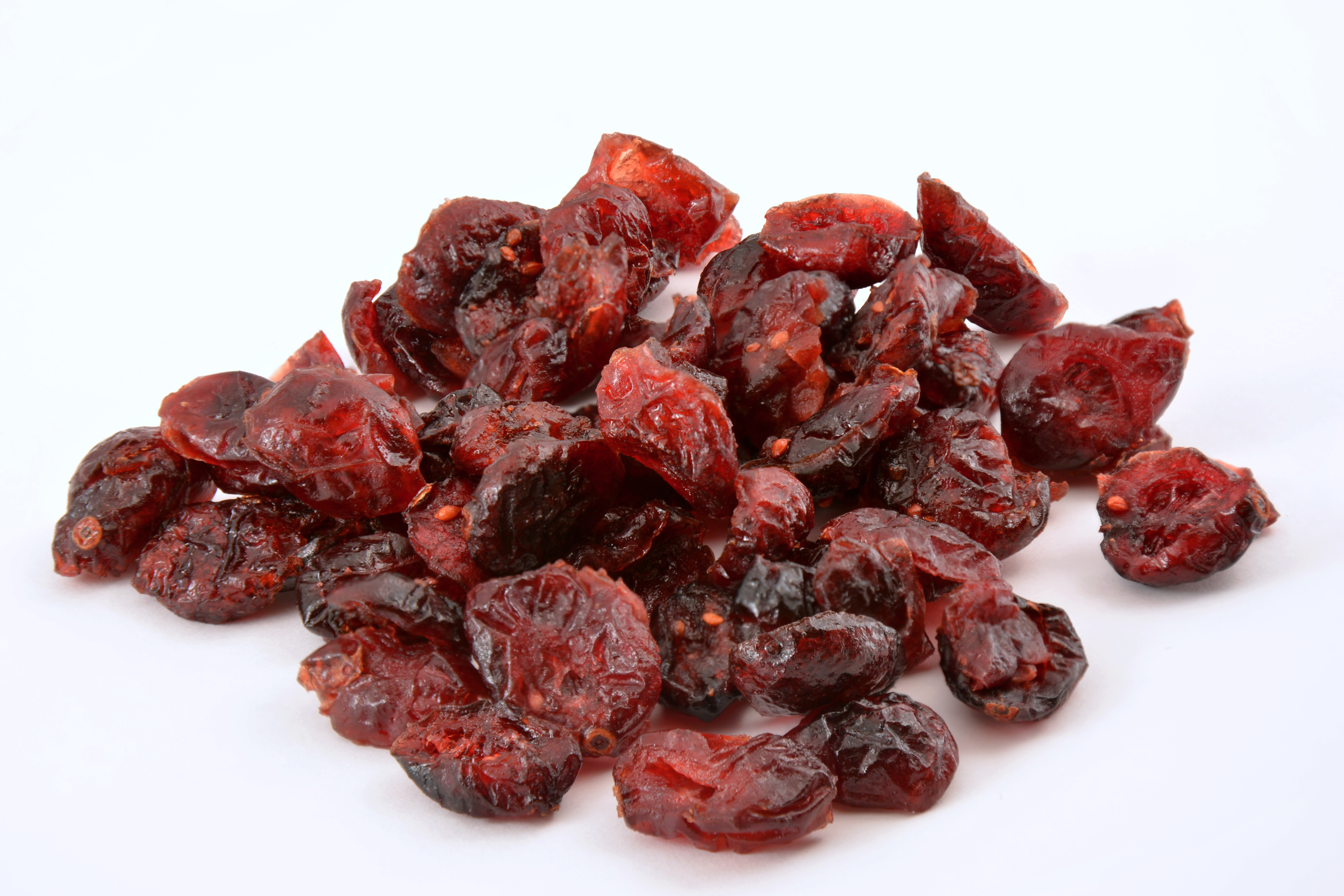
Dried cranberries

As fresh cranberries are hard, sour, and bitter, about 95% of cranberries are processed and used to make cranberry juice and sauce. They are also sold dried and sweetened. Cranberry juice is usually sweetened or blended with other fruit juices to reduce its natural tartness. At four teaspoons of sugar per 100 grams (one teaspoon per ounce), cranberry juice cocktail is more highly sweetened than even soda drinks that have been linked to obesity.

Usually cranberries as fruit are cooked into a compote or jelly, known as cranberry sauce. Such preparations are traditionally served with roast turkey, as a staple of Thanksgiving (both in Canada and in the United States) as well as English dinners. The berry is also used in baking (muffins, scones, cakes and breads). In baking it is often combined with orange or orange zest. Less commonly, cranberries are used to add tartness to savory dishes such as soups and stews.

Fresh cranberries can be frozen at home, and will keep up to nine months; they can be used directly in recipes without thawing.

There are several alcoholic cocktails, including the cosmopolitan, that include cranberry juice.

=== Urinary tract infections ===
A 2023 Cochrane systematic review of 50 studies concluded there is moderate evidence that consuming cranberry products (such as juice or capsules) may reduce the risk of urinary tract infections (UTIs) in women with recurrent UTIs, in children, and in people susceptible to UTIs following clinical interventions; there was little evidence of effect in elderly people, those with urination disorders or pregnant women.

When the quality of meta-analyses on the efficacy of consuming cranberry products for preventing or treating UTIs is examined with the weaker evidence that is available, large variation and uncertainty of effects are seen, resulting from inconsistencies of clinical research design and inadequate numbers of subjects. In 2014, the European Food Safety Authority reviewed the evidence for one brand of cranberry extract and concluded that a cause and effect relationship had not been established between cranberry consumption and reduced risk of UTIs.

A 2022 review of international urology guidelines on UTI found that most clinical organizations felt the evidence for use of cranberry products to inhibit UTIs was conflicting, unconvincing or weak.

== Research ==
=== Phytochemicals ===
Raw cranberries, cranberry juice and cranberry extracts are a source of polyphenols – including proanthocyanidins, flavonols and quercetin. These phytochemical compounds are being studied in vivo and in vitro for possible effects on the cardiovascular system, immune system and cancer. However, there is no confirmation from human studies that consuming cranberry polyphenols provides anti-cancer, immune, or cardiovascular benefits. Potential is limited by poor absorption and rapid excretion.

Cranberry juice contains a high molecular weight non-dializable material that is under research for its potential to affect formation of plaque by Streptococcus mutans pathogens that cause tooth decay. Cranberry juice components are also being studied for possible effects on kidney stone formation.

=== Extract quality ===
Problems may arise with the lack of validation for quantifying of A-type proanthocyanidins (PAC) extracted from cranberries. For instance, PAC extract quality and content can be performed using different methods including the European Pharmacopoeia method, liquid chromatography–mass spectrometry, or a modified 4-dimethylaminocinnamaldehyde colorimetric method. Variations in extract analysis can lead to difficulties in assessing the quality of PAC extracts from different cranberry starting material, such as by regional origin, ripeness at time of harvest and post-harvest processing. Assessments show that quality varies greatly from one commercial PAC extract product to another.

== Marketing and economics ==
=== United States ===
Cranberry sales in the United States have traditionally been associated with holidays of Thanksgiving and Christmas.

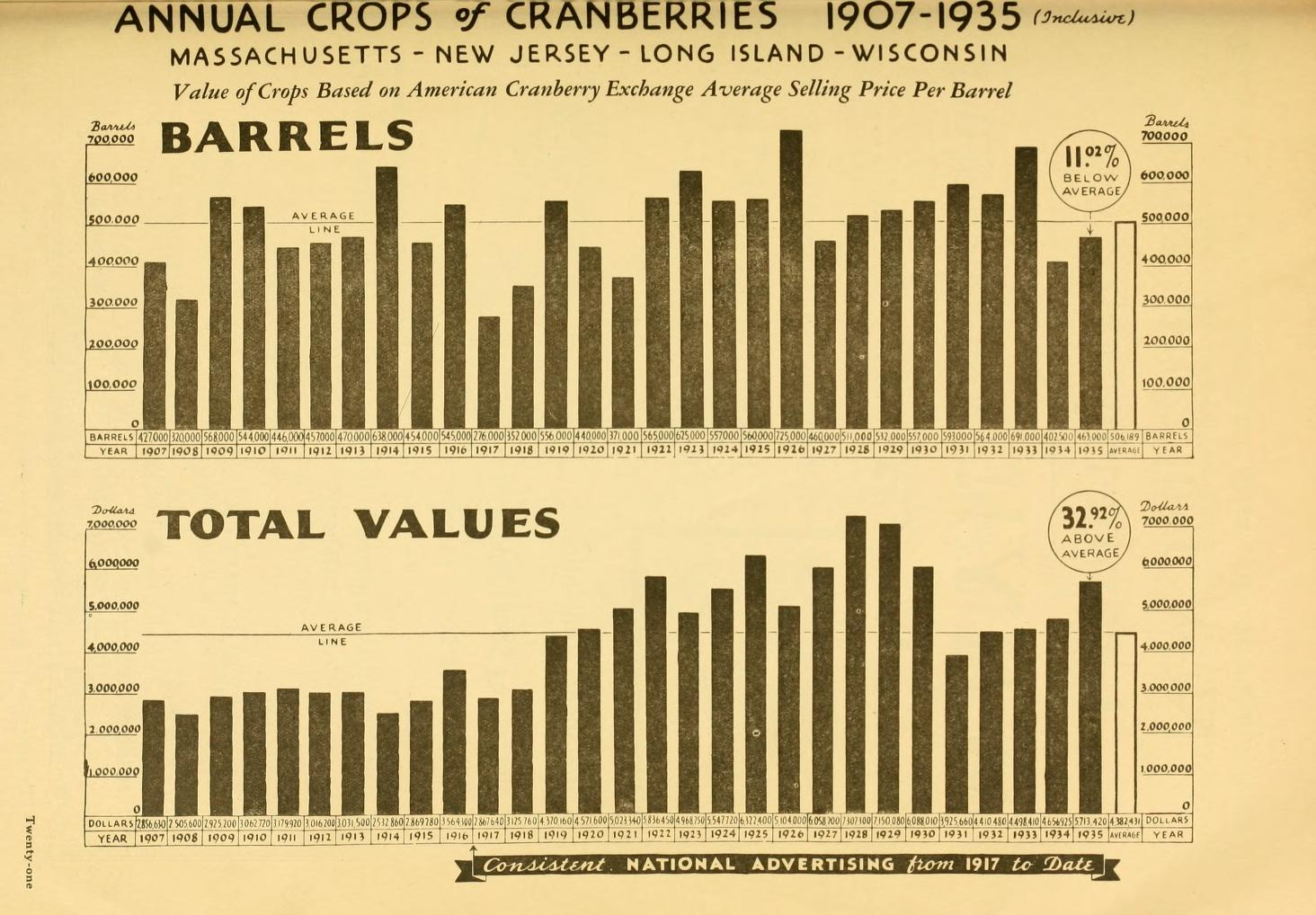
Annual U.S. crops of cranberries, 1907 to 1935

In the U.S., large-scale cranberry cultivation has been developed as opposed to other countries. American cranberry growers have a long history of cooperative marketing. As early as 1904, John Gaynor, a Wisconsin grower, and A.U. Chaney, a fruit broker from Des Moines, Iowa, organized Wisconsin growers into a cooperative called the Wisconsin Cranberry Sales Company to receive a uniform price from buyers. Growers in New Jersey and Massachusetts were also organized into cooperatives, creating the National Fruit Exchange that marketed fruit under the Eatmor brand. The success of cooperative marketing almost led to its failure. With consistent and high prices, area and production doubled between 1903 and 1917 and prices fell.

With surplus cranberries and changing American households some enterprising growers began canning cranberries that were below-grade for fresh market. Competition between canners was fierce because profits were thin. The Ocean Spray cooperative was established in 1930 through a merger of three primary processing companies: Ocean Spray Preserving company, Makepeace Preserving Co, and Cranberry Products Co. The new company was called Cranberry Canners, Inc. and used the Ocean Spray label on their products. Since the new company represented over 90% of the market, it would have been illegal under American antitrust laws had attorney John Quarles not found an exemption for agricultural cooperatives. As of 2006, about 65% of the North American industry belongs to the Ocean Spray cooperative.

In 1958, Morris April Brothers—who produced Eatmor brand cranberry sauce in Tuckahoe, New Jersey—brought an action against Ocean Spray for violation of the Sherman Antitrust Act and won $200,000 in real damages plus triple damages, just in time for the Great Cranberry Scare: on 9 November 1959, Secretary of the United States Department of Health, Education, and Welfare Arthur S. Flemming announced that some of the 1959 cranberry crop was tainted with traces of the herbicide aminotriazole. The market for cranberries collapsed and growers lost millions of dollars. However, the scare taught the industry that they could not be completely dependent on the holiday market for their products; they had to find year-round markets for their fruit. They also had to be exceedingly careful about their use of pesticides. After the aminotriazole scare, Ocean Spray reorganized and spent substantial sums on product development. New products such as cranberry-apple juice blends were introduced, followed by other juice blends.

Cranberry handlers (processors) include Ocean Spray, Cliffstar Corporation, Northland Cranberries Inc. (Sun Northland LLC), Clement Pappas & Co., and Decas Cranberry Products as well as a number of small handlers and processors.

==== Cranberry Marketing Committee ====
The Cranberry Marketing Committee is an organization that was established in 1962 as a Federal Marketing Order to ensure a stable, orderly supply of good quality product. The order has been renewed and modified slightly over the years. The market order has been invoked during six crop years: 1962 (12%), 1963 (5%), 1970 (10%), 1971 (12%), 2000 (15%), and 2001 (35%). Even though supply still exceeds demand, there is little will to invoke the Federal Marketing Order out of the realization that any pullback in supply by U.S. growers would easily be filled by Canadian production.

The Cranberry Marketing Committee, based in Wareham, Massachusetts, represents more than 1,100 cranberry growers and 60 cranberry handlers across Massachusetts, Rhode Island, Connecticut, New Jersey, Wisconsin, Michigan, Minnesota, Oregon, Washington and New York (Long Island). The authority for the actions taken by the Cranberry Marketing Committee is provided in Chapter IX, Title 7, Code of Federal Regulations which is called the Federal Cranberry Marketing Order. The Order is part of the Agricultural Marketing Agreement Act of 1937, identifying cranberries as a commodity good that can be regulated by Congress. The Federal Cranberry Marketing Order has been altered over the years to expand the Cranberry Marketing Committee's ability to develop projects in the United States and around the world. The Cranberry Marketing Committee currently runs promotional programs in the United States, China, India, Mexico, Pan-Europe, and South Korea.

=== International trade ===
As of 2016, the European Union was the largest importer of American cranberries, followed individually by Canada, China, Mexico, and South Korea. From 2013 to 2017, U.S. cranberry exports to China grew exponentially, making China the second largest country importer, reaching $36 million in cranberry products. The China–United States trade war resulted in many Chinese businesses cutting off ties with their U.S. cranberry suppliers.
