= Limotettix vaccinii =

- Adult form

Scientific classification
- Kingdom: Animalia
- Phylum: Arthropoda
- Clade: Pancrustacea
- Class: Insecta
- Order: Hemiptera
- Suborder: Auchenorrhyncha
- Family: Cicadellidae
- Genus: Limotettix
- Species: L. vaccinii

Binomial name
- Limotettix vaccinii Van Duzee, 1890

Synonyms
- Synonymy: Athysanus vaccinii Van Duzee; Euscelis vaccinii Van Duzee; Ophiola vaccinii Van Duzee; Scleroracus vaccinii Van Duzee

Species of leafhopper

Limotettix vaccinii, the blunt-nosed leafhopper, is a leafhopper species found around North America that mainly feeds on cranberries, with potential to feed on other ericaceous plants notably leatherleaf. Limotettix vaccinii is predominant vector of cranberry false blossom disease, which is currently one of the most major threats to the cranberry industry.

== History ==
Cranberry false blossom disease was first described in 1908, and was a major concern for the cranberry industry. In 1928, Limotettix vaccinii was identified as the vector of this disease, which was followed by a major cranberry breeding program to develop leafhopper/false blossom resistant varieties in the 1930s-1960s. Not long after the breeding program was initiated, insecticides began to develop and popularize. At this point, insecticides were a cheap and easy way to manage blunt-nosed leafhoppers to prevent the spread of cranberry false blossom disease, so in the 1980s-1990s a second breeding program for cranberries was undertook that aimed for high-quality high-yielding varieties, which did not inherently keep the resistant traits. However, this coincided with the passing of the Food Quality Protection Act of 1996 by the United States Environmental Protection Agency, which began the regulation and restriction of pesticides that had health and/or environmental risks. Therefore, this had led to the re-emergence of the blunt-nosed leafhopper and continued spread of cranberry false blossom disease.

== Description ==
This leafhopper species is univoltine, having only one generation per year. Eggs are translucent white, cylindrical (~1mm length and 0.25mm width), and are laid lengthwise beneath the bark of young, tender stems. There are five instars of nymphs, which are found mid May throughout June while adults are found starting mid-June until end of July, although there have been reports of individuals found in mid August and even until October. Nymphs range from 0.7 mm to 4 mm depending on the instar, go from being lighter greenish-yellow in color to ranging from green to brown to gray. Adults are around 4-4.5 mm, and have wings with striations going longways and stripes going across the head. These leafhoppers feed and reproduce mostly on cranberry and probably leatherleaf, and presumably are phloem feeders that prefer newer growth.

== Range ==
Limotettix vaccinii can be found northeastern North America overlapping with the native cranberry range, being most prevalent in New Jersey, but is also found in Massachusetts, Wisconsin, and Québec.

== Damage ==
The blunt-nosed leafhopper feeding itself does relatively minimal damage; the main concern of this pest is its ability to transmit cranberry false blossom disease. Cranberry false blossom disease is caused by the phytoplasma Candidatus Phytoplasma pruni subgroup 16SrIII-Y, within the 16SrIII [X-disease] group, which is a wall-less, phloem-limited bacterium. Symptoms of this systemic and persistent disease include stunting, witches' broom, phyllody, and most importantly sterile, erect flowers. This results in no fruit production in infected plants, and consequent yield losses.
