= Mountain cranberry =

Mountain cranberry is a common name for several plants and may refer to:

- Another name for bearberries, three species of dwarf shrubs in the genus Arctostaphylos
- Vaccinium vitis-idaea, a small evergreen shrub widely distributed in the Northern Hemisphere
- Vaccinium vitis-idaea subsp. minus, a subspecies
- Vaccinium erythrocarpum, a deciduous shrub native to the southeastern United States
