= Dasineura oxycoccana =

Scientific classification
- Kingdom: Animalia
- Phylum: Arthropoda
- Clade: Pancrustacea
- Class: Insecta
- Order: Diptera
- Family: Cecidomyiidae
- Genus: Dasineura
- Species: D. oxycoccana

Binomial name
- Dasineura oxycoccana Johnson, 1899

Species of gall midge

Dasineura oxycoccana, also known as blueberry gall midge or cranberry tipworm, is a species of gall midge in the family Cecidomyiidae, forming galls on Vaccinium species, notably blueberries and cranberries. It is found all across North America, being reported from Florida up throughout Maine, and west to Oregon. It has also invaded European countries including Italy, Latvia, Lithuania, Netherlands, Poland, Romania, and the UK and also recently invaded Japan and Korea. It can be a serious pest of blueberries, especially in southern states like Georgia and Florida, where it attacks floral buds and vegetative shoots. They can also attack and cause economic harm cranberries, although current research suggests that the blueberry-attacking and cranberry-attacking Dasineura oxycoccana are not truly the same species.

== Description ==
Later instar blueberry gall midge larvae inside northern highbush blueberry leaf terminal

Mid instar blueberry gall midge on northern highbush blueberry leaf terminal

Adult Dasineura oxycoccana are small flies, around 2-3 mm long, with an orange abdomen. Larvae are legless maggots that can be found inside flower buds or leaf terminals. Early instar larvae are a translucent white, becoming more opaque white, and eventually maturing reddish in color.

Current research suggests Dasineura oxycoccana to be a cryptic species complex in which those that attack blueberries and those that attack cranberries have unique pheromones, genomes, and phenology, showing possible sympatric speciation. While there is potential for gene flow, blueberry gall midge and cranberry tipworm do not share reproductive behaviors.

== Range ==
Dasineura oxycoccana has been reported all across North America, including British Columbia, Florida, Georgia, Maine, Massachusetts, Michigan, Mississippi, New Jersey, Oregon, Wisconsin, and Washington. It has also since invaded into Europe and Asia, and is found in countries such as Japan, Korea, Italy, Latvia, Lithuania, Netherlands, Poland, Romania, and the UK.

== Damage ==
Blueberry gall midge larvae on leaf terminal of northern highbush blueberry

Blueberry gall midge damage on northern highbush blueberry leaf terminal

Dasineura oxycoccana is known to attack plants in the genus Vaccinium, with reports on Vaccinium corymbosum (northern highbush blueberry), Vaccinium X darrowii (southern highbush blueberry), Vaccinium angustifolium (lowbush blueberry), Vaccinium virgatum (rabbiteye blueberry), and Vaccinium macrocarpon (large cranberry). In southern regions like Georgia and Florida, it damages flower and vegetative buds, which can lead up to 100% losses. In more northern regions, its phenology does not always align with flowering, and thus often attacks vegetative leaf tips. This leads to curling and distortion of leaf tips and excessive branching. This insect often prefers new growth of the terminals.

== Etymology ==
The epithet oxycoccana derives from the subgenus Oxycoccus within Vaccinium, referring to small cranberry species Vaccinium oxycoccos, with oxys meaning sharp or acidic, and kokkos meaning berry or seed, thus describing the sour taste of cranberries.

Blueberry gall midge is the common name of the insect when present in blueberry systems. In cranberries, Dasineura oxycoccana often does not directly attack flowers, instead going for the tender new tips, thus it being called cranberry tipworm in cranberry systems.
