= Cranberry root rot =

Plant disease

Cranberry Root Rot (CRR) is a disease in cranberries that can cause a decline in yield.

== Hosts and symptoms ==
It is categorized by a decline in vine density, and more severe cases can result in dieback of vines over larger areas. A reduction in root mass can also cause secondary symptoms associated with nutrient deficiency. Symptoms can also mirror drought stress, such as chlorosis and wilting. The disease infects the root tissue, limiting its ability to take up water and nutrients, causing these secondary symptoms.

== Disease cycle ==
CRR is usually caused by Phytophthora cinnamomi, but other Phytophthora pathogens may be responsible as well. Phytophthora pathogens are a oomycetes, which indicates that water plays an important role in their lifecycle. The root tissue is infected by the zoospores, the motile life stage of the pathogen, which possess two flagella. The pathogen will eventually produce sporangia, if conditions are favorable, which will produce additional zoospores. Under unfavorable conditions, the pathogen will produce asexual chlamydospores which are more resistant to desiccation and cold conditions than the mycelium of the pathogen. Once the conditions become favorable once more, the chlamydospore will produce a sporangium. The sporangia will release zoospores, continuing the lifecycle of the pathogen

== Management ==
The most important aspect of CRR management is proper drainage. Proper drainage will decrease survivability of the pathogen enough that it will not likely progress to disease. The spread of the pathogen relies on the mobility of the zoospores, which swim using flagella, so limiting soil moisture decreases the ability of zoospores to swim through the soil water. Presence of the inoculum alone is generally not enough to induce disease symptoms, as Phytophthora inoculum is commonly present in irrigation water. Environmental controls, like transitioning from drip irrigation to sprinklers and care to not overwater has been shown to help in other Vaccinium species
