= Henry Hall (American revolution) =

American soldier (American revolution)

- Rank: Captain
- Conflicts: American Revolutionary War

Captain Henry Hall was an American from Dennis, Massachusetts who fought in the American Revolutionary War, who later was the first to successfully cultivate cranberries.
