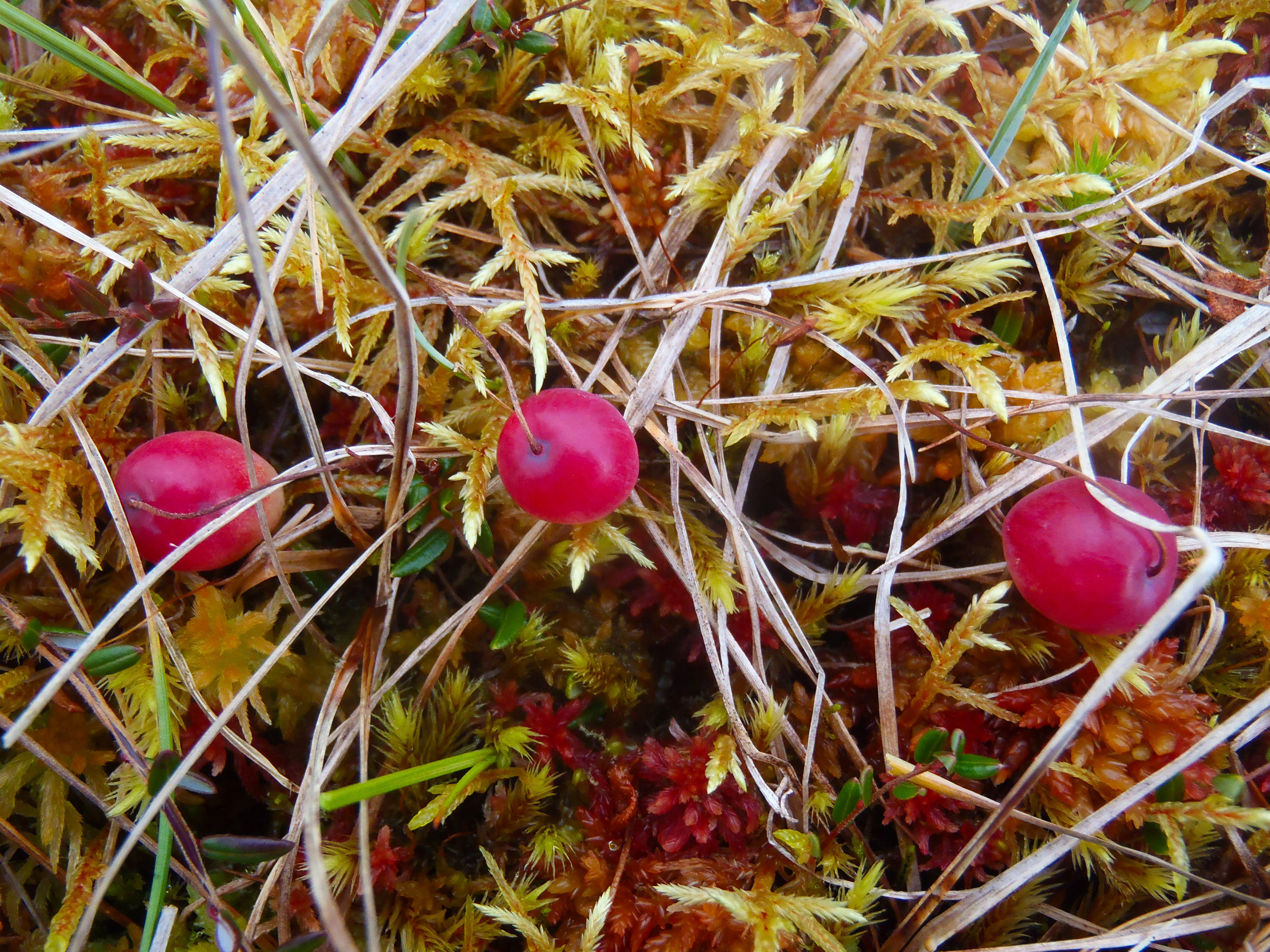

Scientific classification
- Kingdom: Plantae
- Clade: Embryophytes
- Clade: Tracheophytes
- Clade: Spermatophytes
- Clade: Angiosperms
- Clade: Eudicots
- Clade: Asterids
- Order: Ericales
- Family: Ericaceae
- Genus: Vaccinium
- Subgenus: Vaccinium subg. Oxycoccus
- Species: V. microcarpum

Binomial name
- Vaccinium microcarpum (Turcz. ex Rupr.) Schmalh.

= Vaccinium microcarpum =

Species of flowering plant

Vaccinium microcarpum is a species of flowering plant belonging to the family Ericaceae.

Its native range is subarctic to temperate Northern Hemisphere.
