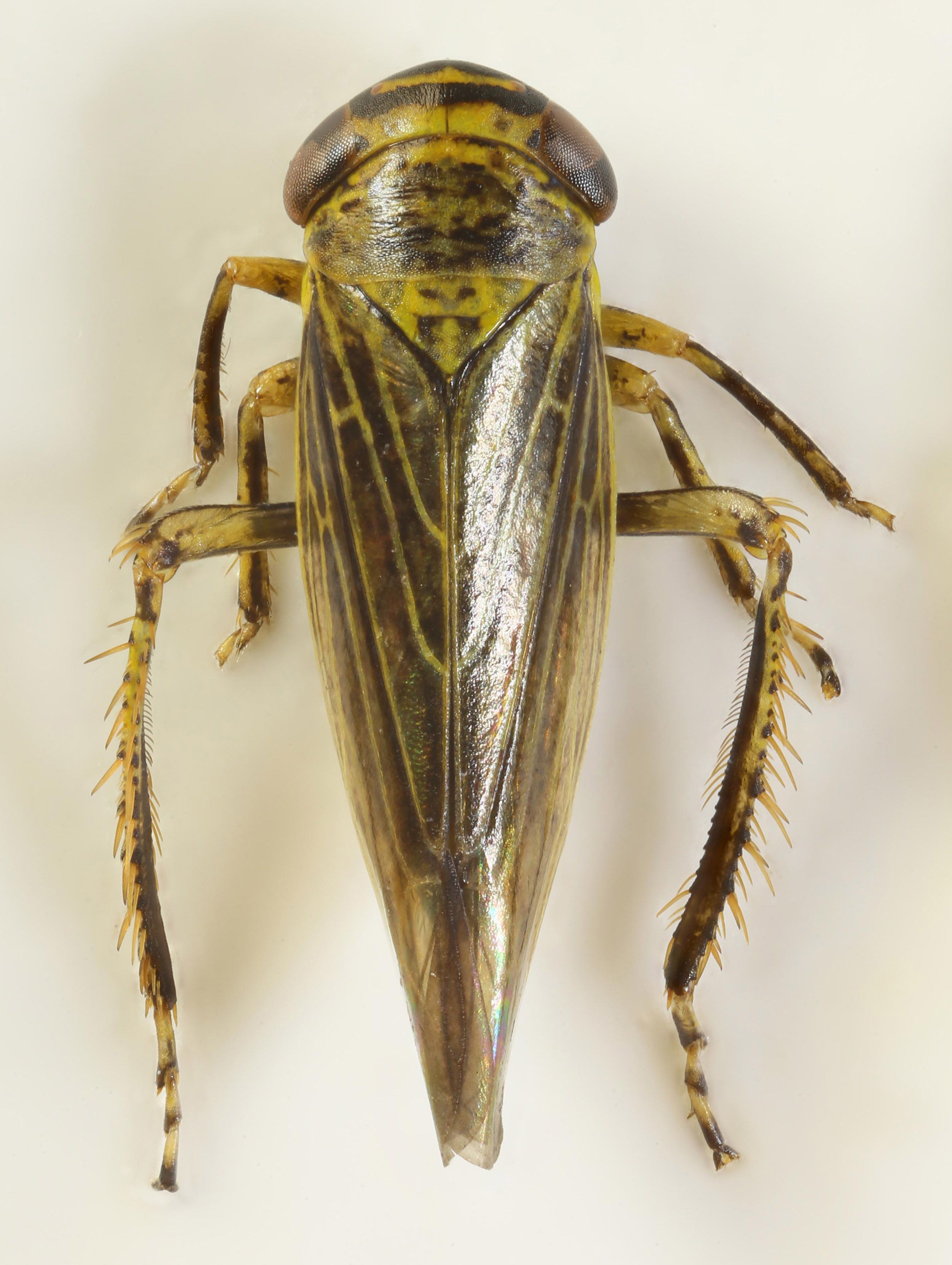

Scientific classification
- Domain: Eukaryota
- Kingdom: Animalia
- Phylum: Arthropoda
- Class: Insecta
- Order: Hemiptera
- Suborder: Auchenorrhyncha
- Family: Cicadellidae
- Subfamily: Deltocephalinae
- Tribe: Limotettigini; Baker, 1915
- Genus: Limotettix; Sahlberg, 1871

Synonyms
- Frigartus

= Limotettix =

Genus of leafhoppers

Limotettix is a genus of leafhoppers in the family Cicadellidae. There are at least 70 described species in Limotettix. Limotettix is the only genus in the tribe Limotettigini of the subfamily Deltocephalinae. A previously included genus, Frigartus, is now considered to be a junior synonym of Limotettix.

== Species ==
These 76 species belong to the genus Limotettix:

- Limotettix adipatus Emeljanov 1966^{c g}
- Limotettix ainoicus Matsumura 1902^{c g}
- Limotettix angustatus Osborn 1915^{c g}
- Limotettix anthracinus Van Duzee, 1894^{c g b}
- Limotettix arctostaphyli (Ball, 1899)^{c g b}
- Limotettix atricapilla Boheman 1845^{c g}
- Limotettix aviger Emeljanov, 1966^{g}
- Limotettix awae Myers 1924^{c g}
- Limotettix balli Medler 1958^{c g}
- Limotettix beameri Medler 1958^{c g}
- Limotettix bisoni Knull 1952^{c g}
- Limotettix brooksi Hamilton 1994^{c g}
- Limotettix bullata Ball 1902^{c g}
- Limotettix cacheola Ball 1928^{c g}
- Limotettix chadchalicus Dlabola 1967^{c g}
- Limotettix comptoniana Ball 1928^{c g}
- Limotettix conservatus Hamilton 1994^{c g}
- Limotettix cuneatus Sanders & DeLong 1920^{c g}
- Limotettix danmai Kuoh 1981^{c g}
- Limotettix dasidus Medler 1955^{c g}
- Limotettix divaricatus Sanders & DeLong 1923^{c g}
- Limotettix elegans Hamilton 1994^{c g}
- Limotettix emeljanovi Hamilton 1994^{c g}
- Limotettix ferganensis Dubovsky, 1966^{c g b}
- Limotettix finitimus Van Duzee 1925^{c g}
- Limotettix flavopicta Ishihara 1953^{c g}
- Limotettix frigidus Ball 1899^{c g}
- Limotettix glomerosa Ball 1910^{c g}
- Limotettix harrisi Knight 1975^{c g}
- Limotettix humidus Osborn 1915^{c g}
- Limotettix identicus Tishechkin 2003^{c g}
- Limotettix incerta Evans 1966^{c g}
- Limotettix instabilis Van Duzee 1893^{c g}
- Limotettix kryptus (Medler, 1955)^{c g b}
- Limotettix kuwayamai Ishihara 1966^{c g}
- Limotettix luteola Sleesman 1929^{c g}
- Limotettix medleri Hamilton 1994^{c g}
- Limotettix melastigmus Medler 1955^{c g}
- Limotettix minuendus Hamilton 1994^{c g}
- Limotettix myralis Medler 1958^{c g}
- Limotettix nigrax Medler, 1943^{c g b}
- Limotettix nigristriatus Hamilton 1994^{c g}
- Limotettix obesura Hamilton, 1994^{c g b}
- Limotettix ochrifrons Vilbaste 1973^{c g}
- Limotettix omani Medler 1955^{c g}
- Limotettix onukii Matsumura 1902^{c g}
- Limotettix osborni Ball, 1928^{c g b}
- Limotettix pallidus Knight 1975^{c g}
- Limotettix parallelus (Van Duzee, 1891)^{c g b}
- Limotettix plutonius (Uhler, 1877)^{c g b}
- Limotettix pseudosphagneticus Hamilton 1994^{c g}
- Limotettix pseudostriola Vilbaste 1965^{c g}
- Limotettix pullatus Evans 1941^{c g}
- Limotettix salinus Emeljanov 1966^{c g}
- Limotettix schedia Hamilton^{c g}
- Limotettix scudderi Hamilton 1994^{c g}
- Limotettix shasta Ball 1916^{c g}
- Limotettix sphagneticus Emeljanov, 1964^{g}
- Limotettix strictus Hamilton 1994^{c g}
- Limotettix striola Fallén 1806^{c g}
- Limotettix symphoricarpae Ball 1901^{c g}
- Limotettix tachyporias Kirkaldy 1907^{c g}
- Limotettix taramus Medler 1958^{c g}
- Limotettix transversa Fallén 1826^{c}
- Limotettix transversus^{c g}
- Limotettix truncatus Sleesman 1929^{c g}
- Limotettix tuvensis Vilbaste 1980^{c g}
- Limotettix typhae Vilbaste 1968^{c g}
- Limotettix uhleri Ball 1911^{c g}
- Limotettix uneolus Ball 1929^{c g}
- Limotettix urnura Hamilton 1994^{c g}
- Limotettix vaccinii Van Duzee 1890^{c g}
- Limotettix varus Ball, 1901^{c g b}
- Limotettix vilbasticus Dlabola 1967^{c g}
- Limotettix xanthus Hamilton 1994^{c g}
- Limotettix zacki Hamilton 1994^{c g}

Data sources: i = ITIS, c = Catalogue of Life, g = GBIF, b = Bugguide.net
