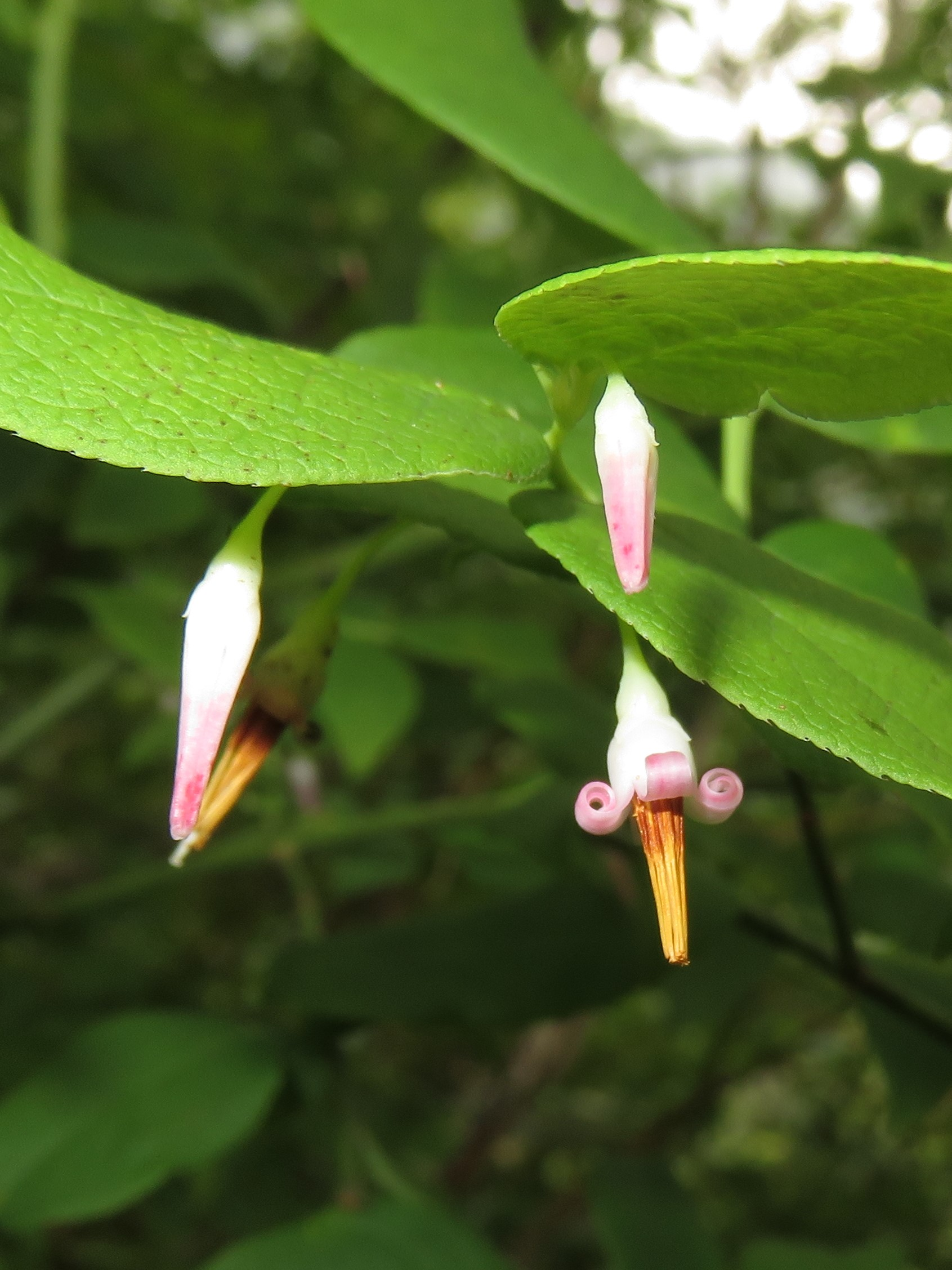

Scientific classification
- Kingdom: Plantae
- Clade: Embryophytes
- Clade: Tracheophytes
- Clade: Spermatophytes
- Clade: Angiosperms
- Clade: Eudicots
- Clade: Asterids
- Order: Ericales
- Family: Ericaceae
- Genus: Vaccinium
- Subgenus: Vaccinium subg. Oxycoccus
- Species: V. japonicum

Binomial name
- Vaccinium japonicum Miq.

Subspecies
- See text

Synonyms
- Hugeria japonica (Miq.) Nakai; Oxycoccoides japonicus (Miq.) Nakai; Oxycoccus japonicus (Miq.) Makino; Vaccinium erythrocarpum subsp. japonicum (Miq.) Kloet

= Vaccinium japonicum =

Species of plant

Vaccinium japonicum is an Asian species of deciduous flowering shrub.

== Taxonomy ==
This species was once considered a subspecies of the North American species, Vaccinium erythrocarpum, but it has since been split to a full species.

Vaccinium japonicum has the following accepted subspecies:

- Vaccinium japonicum var. japonicum – south Korea, Japan
- Vaccinium japonicum var. lasiostemon Hayata – Taiwan
- Vaccinium japonicum var. sinicum (Nakai) Rehder – central and southern mainland China

== Distribution and habitat ==
The species is native to Japan, Taiwan, Korea, and parts of China.

It is specifically found in the Chinese provinces of Anhui, Fujian, Gansu, Guangdong, Guangxi, Guizhou, Hubei, Hunan, Jiangxi, Sichuan, Yunnan, and Zhejiang. They are typically found in forests and thickets within alpine areas at altitudes of 1,000–2,600 metres (3,300–8,500 feet).
