= Cranberry fruit rot =

Plant disease

Cranberry fruit rot (CFR) is a disease complex of multiple fungal agents affecting the American cranberry (Vaccinium macrocarpon). Cranberry fruit rot can be categorized into field rot (occurring while growing and before harvest) and storage rot (occurring any time after harvest). The importance of field and fruit rot depends on how the cranberries will be processed after harvest. If cranberries are immediately processed after harvest, growers focus on preventing field rot, while growers seek to prevent storage rot with fresh market cranberries. There are 10–15 fungal pathogens known to cause cranberry fruit rot diseases, some active in only field rot, storage rot, or both. The majority of these fungal pathogens are ascomycetes, with the rest being deuteromycetes. No known bacterial pathogen plays a role in CFR or any major disease of cranberries, potentially due to the low pH conditions of the cranberry fruit.

== Host and symptoms ==
In cranberries, the fruit rot pathogens can infect before or after harvest. The symptoms of rot are related to a general softening and deterioration of the cranberry, which occur both in the field and storage. Each specific rot disease that makes up the CFR disease complex is caused by specific pathogens (Table 1). An example is the field rot cotton ball caused by Monilinia oxycocci, common in Wisconsin, while bitter rot caused by Glomerella cingulate generally occurs in Massachusetts. However, these pathogens have been shown not to be entirely specific to their areas. These symptoms often resemble other forms of fruit deterioration, such as sunscald, hail damage, and temporal physiological breakdown.

Table 1. Adapted from McManus 2001.
Disease	Fungus	Field Rot	Storage Rot
bitter rot	Colletotrichum acutatum Colletotrichum gloeosporioides	X	
cottonball rot	Monilinia oxycocci	X	
early rot	Phyllosticta vaccinii	X	
berry speckle	Phyllosticta elongata	X	X
blotch rot	Physalospora vaccinii	X	X
end rot	Fusicoccum putrefaciens	X	X
ripe rot	Coleophoma empetr	X	X
viscid rot	Phomopsis vaccinii	X	X
yellow rot	Botrytis sp.	X	X
black rot	Allantophomopsis lycopodina Allantophomopsis cytisporea Strasseria geniculata		X

== Disease cycles ==
Due to the complexity and number of fungal pathogens involved in CFR, the specific disease cycles have yet to be fully studied. Researchers believe almost every fruit rot pathogen completes a disease cycle every 1–3 years. Researchers, however, have hypothesized 3 potential disease cycles taken by the pathogens. These 3 disease cycles rely heavily on leaves or stems, either debris or living, mainly because all berries are harvested.

- Type 1. Fungal inoculum overwinters in plant debris on the soil surface. In the spring, the fungi produce fruiting bodies and infect developing plants. The main infection occurs when flowers bloom and during the early parts of fruit development.
- Type 2. Fungi persist in living leaves and then infect as the plant develops fruit, while leaves drop.
- Type 3. Fungal inoculum overwinters in plant debris and infects during cranberry harvest. When the floodwater is released during harvest, spores are dispersed and infect through potential wounds from equipment.

== Management ==
The management of CFR can be complicated and varies due to the number of pathogens and the temporal aspect of fruit rot. Fungicides applied during the projected times of infection and on potential areas, such as flowers and after fruit set, are effective at deterring fruit rot. Due to the number of pathogens, general fungicides such as chlorothalonil are more effective than specific-targeting fungicides. However, fungicides can sometimes reduce fruit quality and set; thus, their use is often limited. Harvest can also play a role in reducing the risk of pathogens. Wet harvest using floodwater, although quicker and easier, can spread pathogens, which would increase the chances of storage rot. Dry harvests can cause more damage to vines and take longer, but can reduce disease spread and decrease the potential of storage rot. Depending on the final use of cranberries, each harvest type can be beneficial. Sanding, a process where sand is laid on the field to stimulate root growth from the harvested cranberries, could actually cover up inoculum with plant debris, which may decrease the chances of field and storage rot. Resistance and biological controls have proved difficult to validate due to the disease complex comprising different fungal pathogens.
