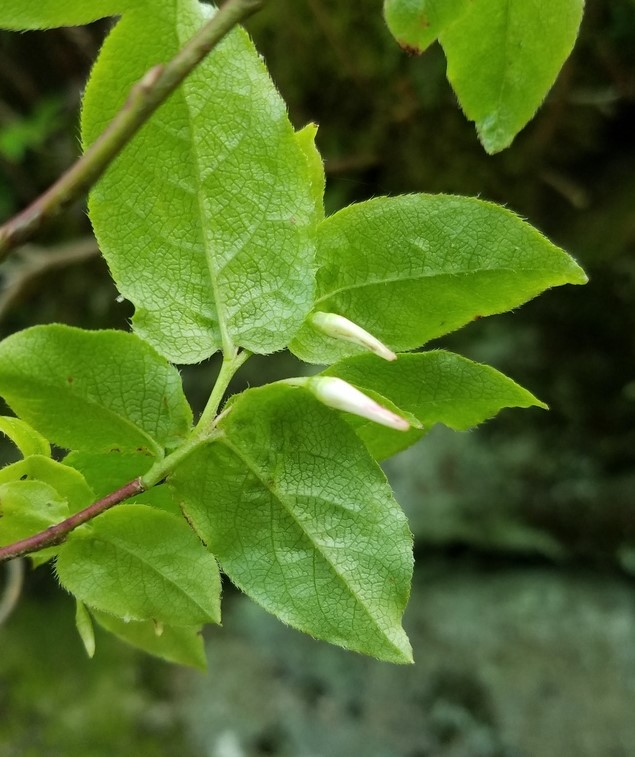
- In Blood Mountain, Georgia

Conservation status
- Secure (NatureServe)

Scientific classification
- Kingdom: Plantae
- Clade: Embryophytes
- Clade: Tracheophytes
- Clade: Spermatophytes
- Clade: Angiosperms
- Clade: Eudicots
- Clade: Asterids
- Order: Ericales
- Family: Ericaceae
- Genus: Vaccinium
- Subgenus: Vaccinium subg. Oxycoccus
- Species: V. erythrocarpum

Binomial name
- Vaccinium erythrocarpum Michx. 1803

Synonyms
- Hugeria erythrocarpa

= Vaccinium erythrocarpum =

Species of cranberry

Vaccinium erythrocarpum, commonly known as southern mountain cranberry or bearberry, more rarely as mountain blueberry or dingleberry, is a deciduous flowering shrub native to the Southeastern United States.

== Description ==
Vaccinium erythrocarpum flowers bloom in June. They are hermaphroditic, of a tubular shape with reflexed petals, and they have long tassel-like stamens that drape below the corolla. They produce somewhat translucent scarlet berries that set in late summer or early autumn. The fruits taste quite similar to other cranberries.

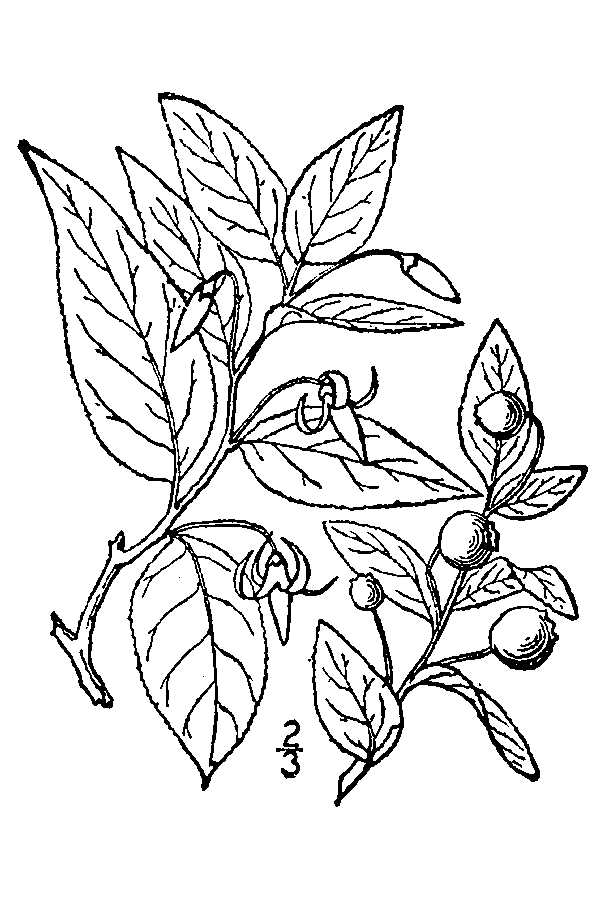
1913 illustration

== Taxonomy ==
Vaccinium erythrocarpum was long considered synonymous with V. japonicum, found in East Asia, however the two have since been split into separate species. Both species are now considered members of the cranberry subgenus Oxycoccus, both also placed into the section Oxycoccoides. These species within sect. Oxycoccoides differ from the rest of the subgenus as they are deciduous shrubs while sect. Oxycoccus consists of trailing evergreen vines.

== Distribution and habitat ==
This species is found in the Southern and Central Appalachians at high elevations, often at prominences within the landscape (especially at the southern end of their range). They can be found in the states of North Carolina, Virginia. and West Virginia. They can be found more rarely listed in Kentucky and Georgia.

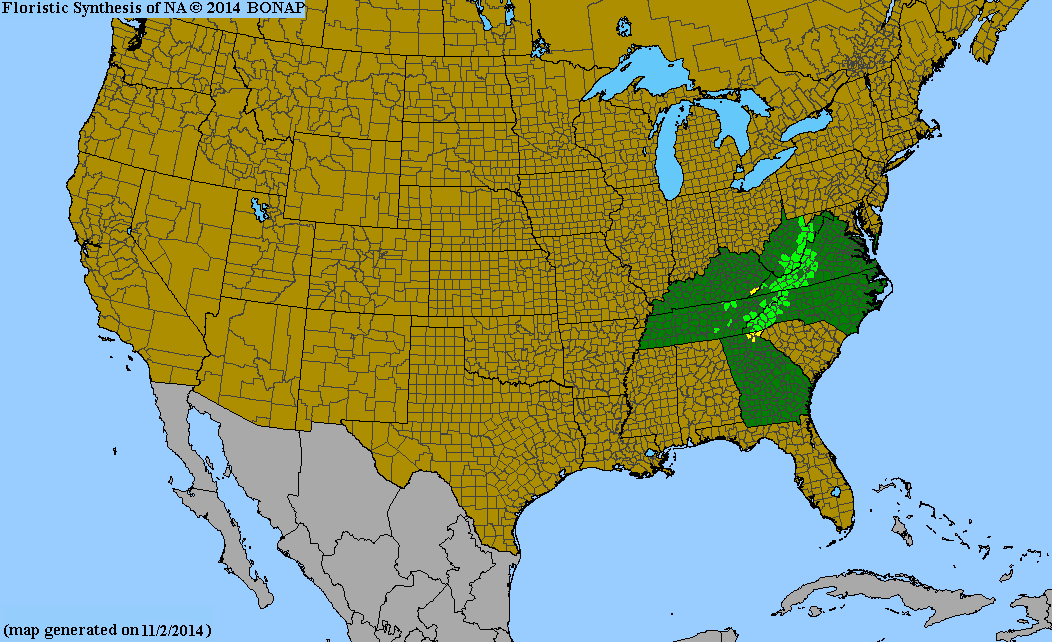
County-level distribution map

== Ecology ==
The flowers are pollinated by insects (primarily large bees). Their berries are edible, and are consumed readily by wildlife. The plant generally grows in woodlands and areas of dappled shade, primarily in mixed oak-heath forests. This species is commonly found on Southern Appalachian heath balds, where it is often a prominent member of the shrub layer.

== Uses ==
The berries are edible. The rarity of the plants and the small quantity of fruits they produce restrict commercial production.
