= Woronin =

Woronin is a surname. Notable people with the surname include:

- Marian Woronin (born 1956), Polish athlete
- Mikhail Stepanovich Woronin (1838–1903), Russian biologist
