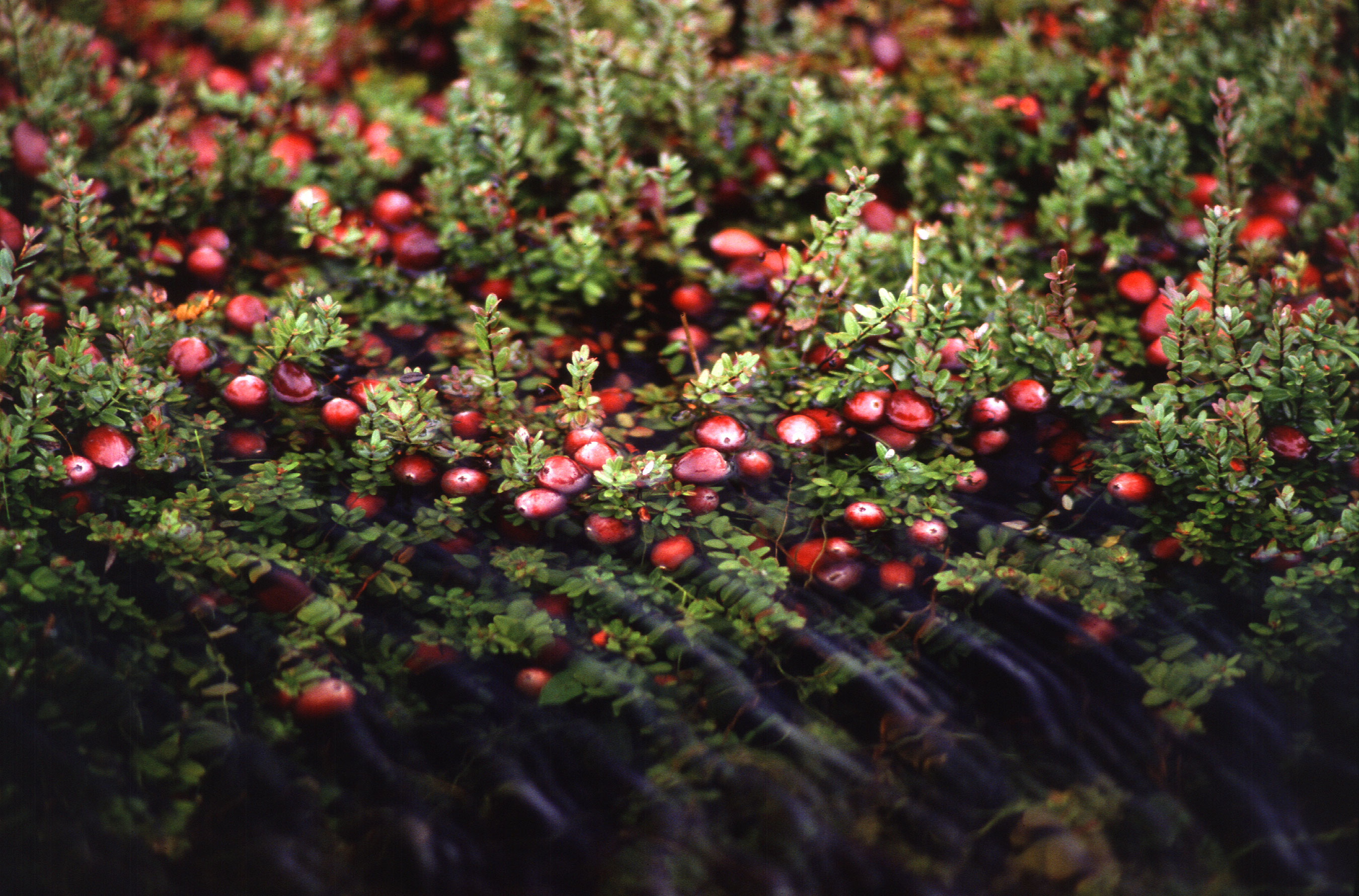
- Floating in a bog

Conservation status
- Least Concern (IUCN 3.1)

Scientific classification
- Kingdom: Plantae
- Clade: Embryophytes
- Clade: Tracheophytes
- Clade: Spermatophytes
- Clade: Angiosperms
- Clade: Eudicots
- Clade: Asterids
- Order: Ericales
- Family: Ericaceae
- Genus: Vaccinium
- Subgenus: Vaccinium subg. Oxycoccus
- Species: V. macrocarpon

Binomial name
- Vaccinium macrocarpon Aiton 1789

Synonyms
- Synonymy: Vaccinium oxycoccos var. oblongifolium Michx.; Schollera macrocarpos (Aiton) Britton; Oxycoca macrocarpa (Aiton) Raf.; Oxycoccus macrocarpos (Aiton) Pers.; Oxycoccus macrocarpus (Aiton) Pers.; Oxycoccus palustris var. macrocarpos (Aiton) Pers.; Schollera macrocarpa (Aiton) Steud.; Vaccinium propinquum Salisb.

= Vaccinium macrocarpon =

Species of aquatic plant

Vaccinium macrocarpon, also called large cranberry, American cranberry and bearberry, is a North American species of cranberry.

== Description ==
Vaccinium macrocarpon is a perennial shrub, often ascending (trailing along the surface of the ground for some distance but then curving upwards). The leaf blades are abaxially glaucous and green adaxially. The leaf blades are 1–2 centimetres (1/2–3/4 in) long, narrowly elliptic to elliptic, and in rare cases oblong.

The pedicels are nodding and slender, measuring 2 to 3 cm (3/4 to 1 1/4 in). It produces white or pink flowers with four petals, followed by sour-tasting red or pink berries 9–14 millimetres (3/8–1/2 in) across.

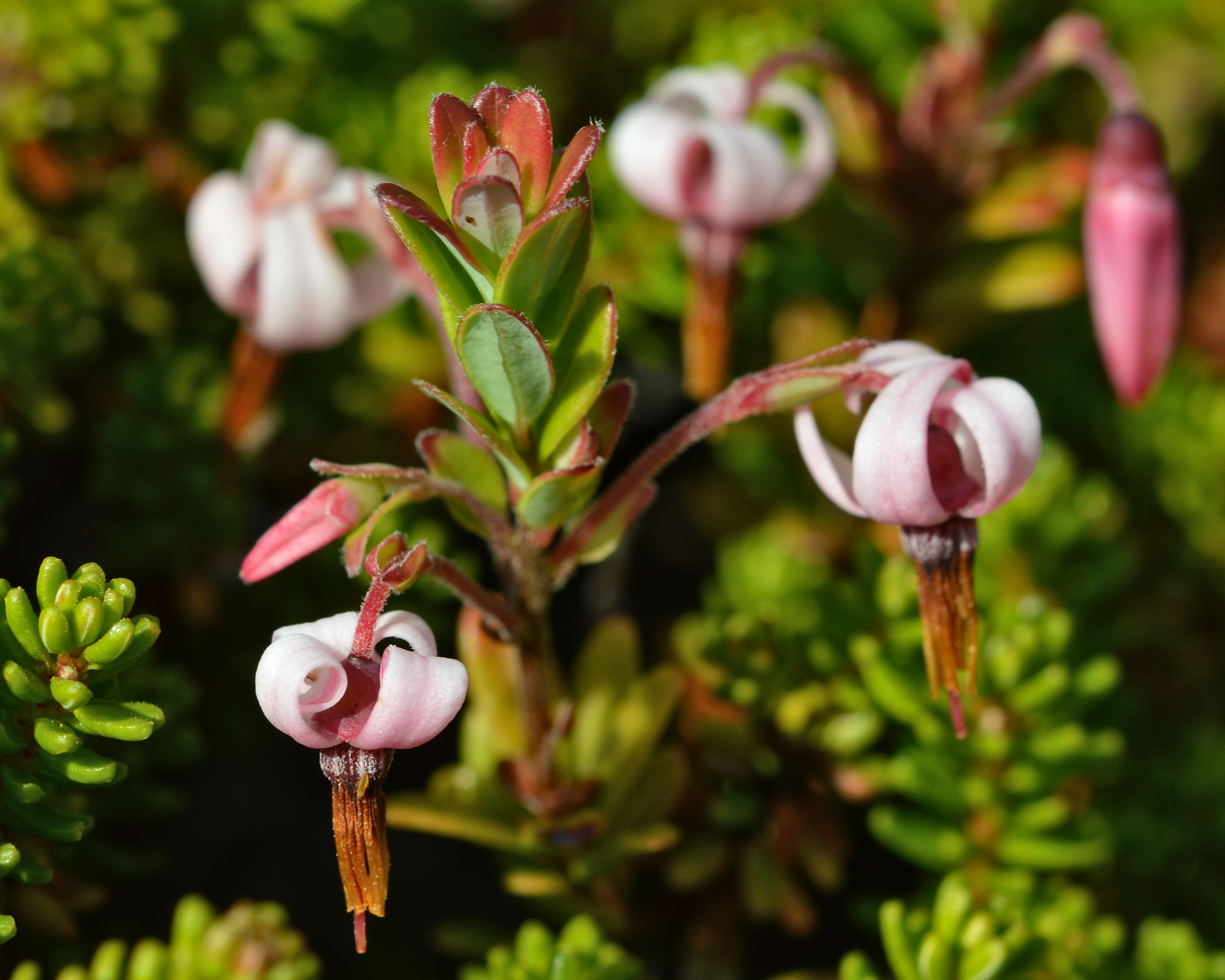
Flowers close-up

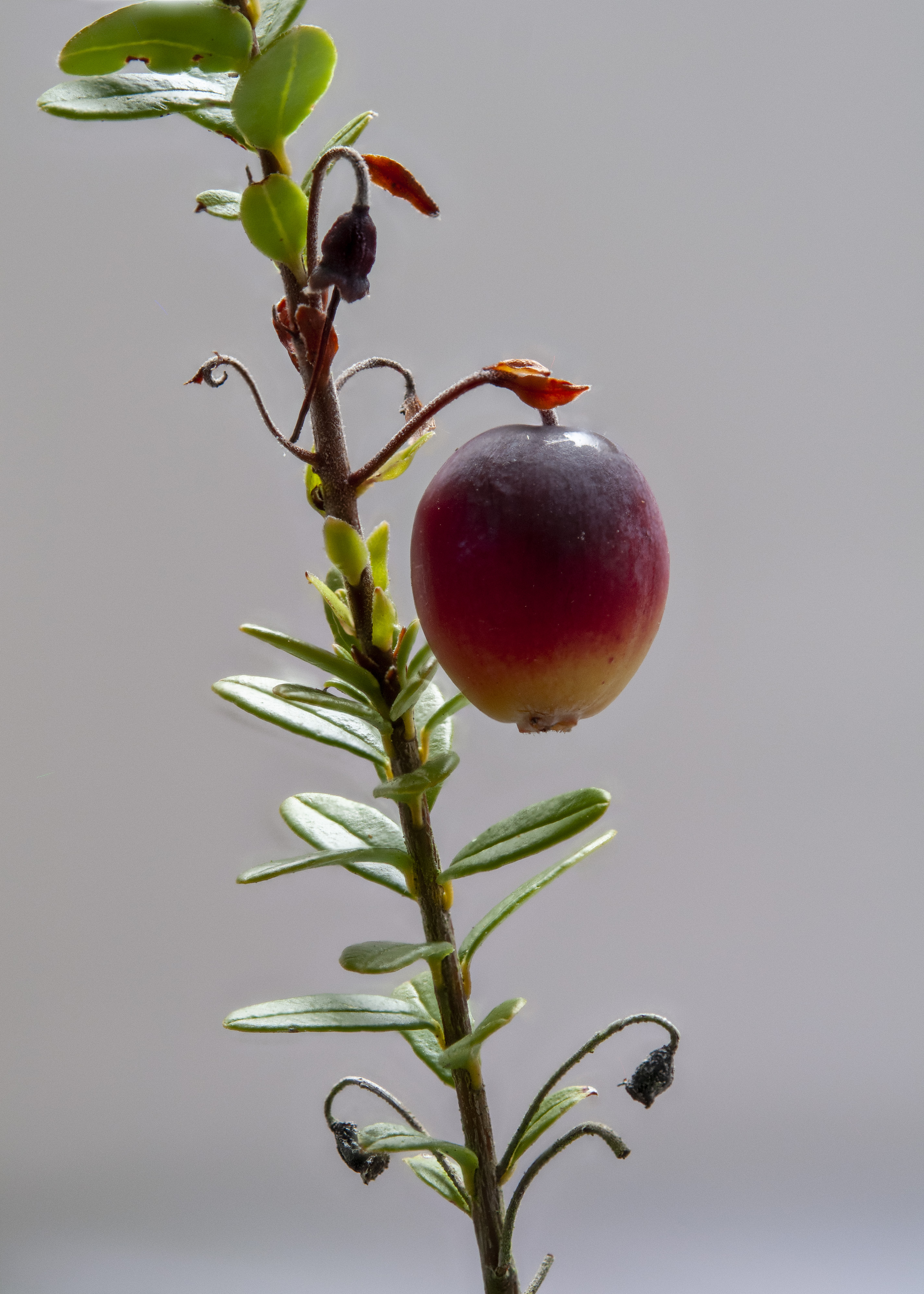
Individual fruit

== Taxonomy ==
The species is in the subgenus Oxycoccus.

=== Etymology ===
The name cranberry comes from the shape of the flower stamen, which looks like a crane's beak.

== Distribution ==
Vaccinium macrocarpon is native to central and eastern Canada (Ontario to Newfoundland) and the northeastern and north-central United States (Northeast, Great Lakes Region, and Appalachians as far south as North Carolina and Tennessee). It is also naturalized in parts of Europe and scattered locations in North America along western Canada (British Columbia) and the western U.S. (West Coast).

== Uses ==
The berries are edible, for which the species is grown commercially as a cash crop. Many cranberries are grown in wetland soils consisting of alternating layers of organic matter and sand; modern harvesting techniques include temporarily flooding fields, shaking berries loose, and gathering the floating berries.

Common uses of the berries includes sauce, jelly, juice, and dried fruit. There is some evidence suggesting that the berries or their juice could be useful in treating or preventing certain urinary tract infections, but this is not certain yet and thus is not substitute for medical management. Some research suggests cranberries may suppress asymptomatic Helicobacter pylori colonization, but they seem to be an inferior treatment compared to antibiotic therapy in symptomatic patients.

== See also ==
- Cranberry fruit rot, which affects V. macrocarpon
