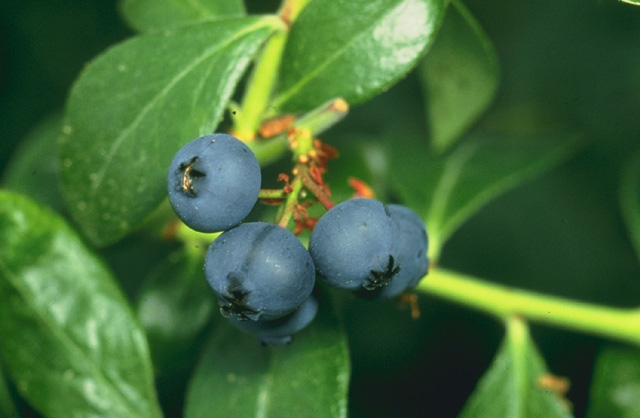
- Vaccinium caesariense

Scientific classification
- Kingdom: Plantae
- Clade: Tracheophytes
- Clade: Angiosperms
- Clade: Eudicots
- Clade: Asterids
- Order: Ericales
- Family: Ericaceae
- Genus: Vaccinium
- Section: Vaccinium sect. Cyanococcus; Rydb.

Species
- See text

= Blueberry =

Perennial plant with blue berries

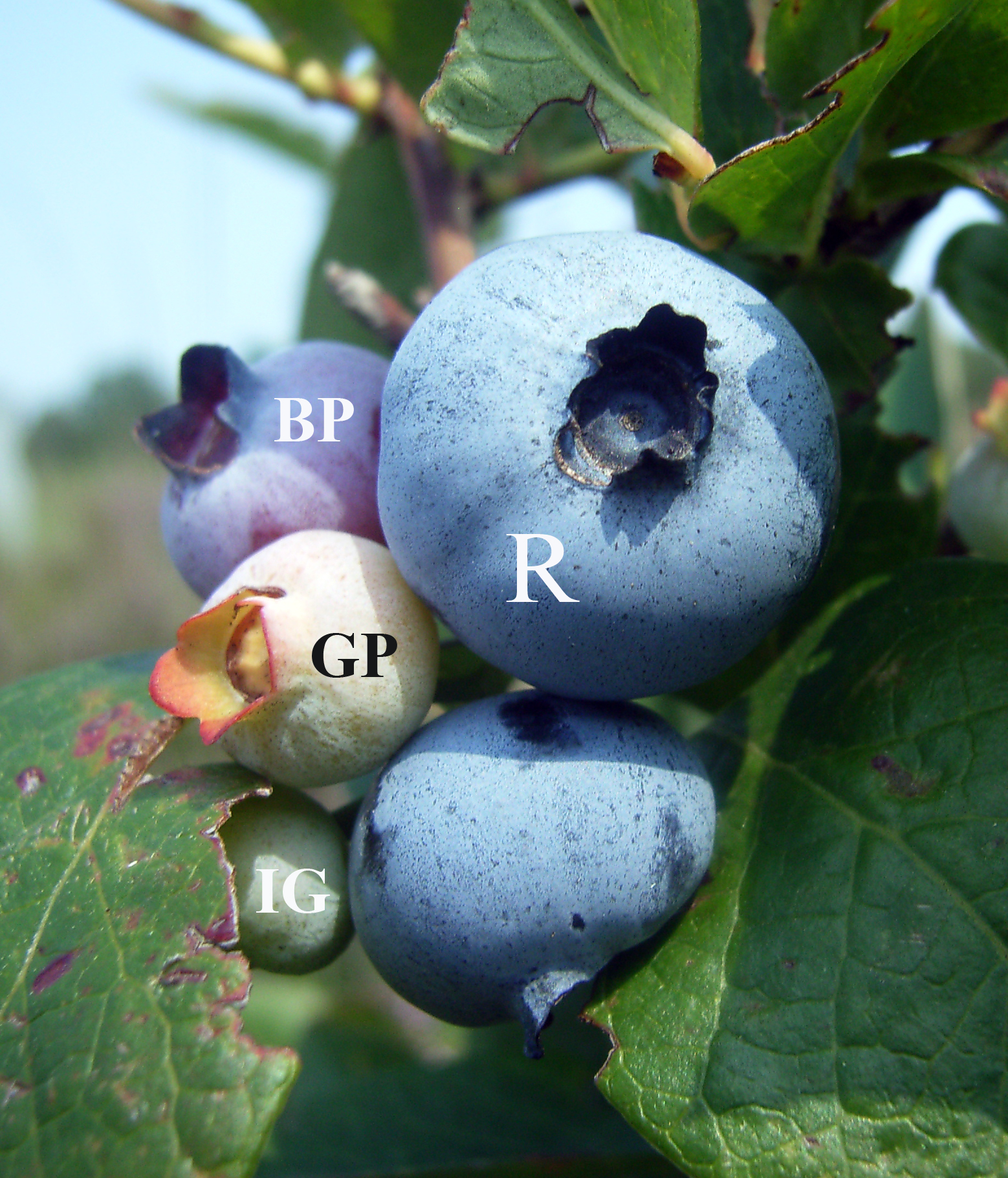
Blueberries showing various stages of maturation. IG = Immature Green, GP = Green Pink, BP = Blue Pink, and R = Ripe.

Blueberries are a widely distributed and widespread group of perennial flowering plants with blue or purple berries. They are classified in the section Cyanococcus within the genus Vaccinium. Commercial blueberries—both wild (lowbush) and cultivated (highbush)—are all native to North America. The highbush varieties were introduced into Europe during the 1930s.

Blueberries are usually prostrate shrubs that can vary in size from 10 centimeters (4 inches) to 4 meters (13 feet) in height. In the commercial production of blueberries, the species with small, pea-size berries growing on low-level bushes are known as "lowbush blueberries" (synonymous with "wild"), while the species with larger berries growing on taller, cultivated bushes are known as "highbush blueberries". In 2025, Canada was the leading producer of lowbush blueberries, while the China produced 35% of the world's supply of highbush blueberries.

== Description ==
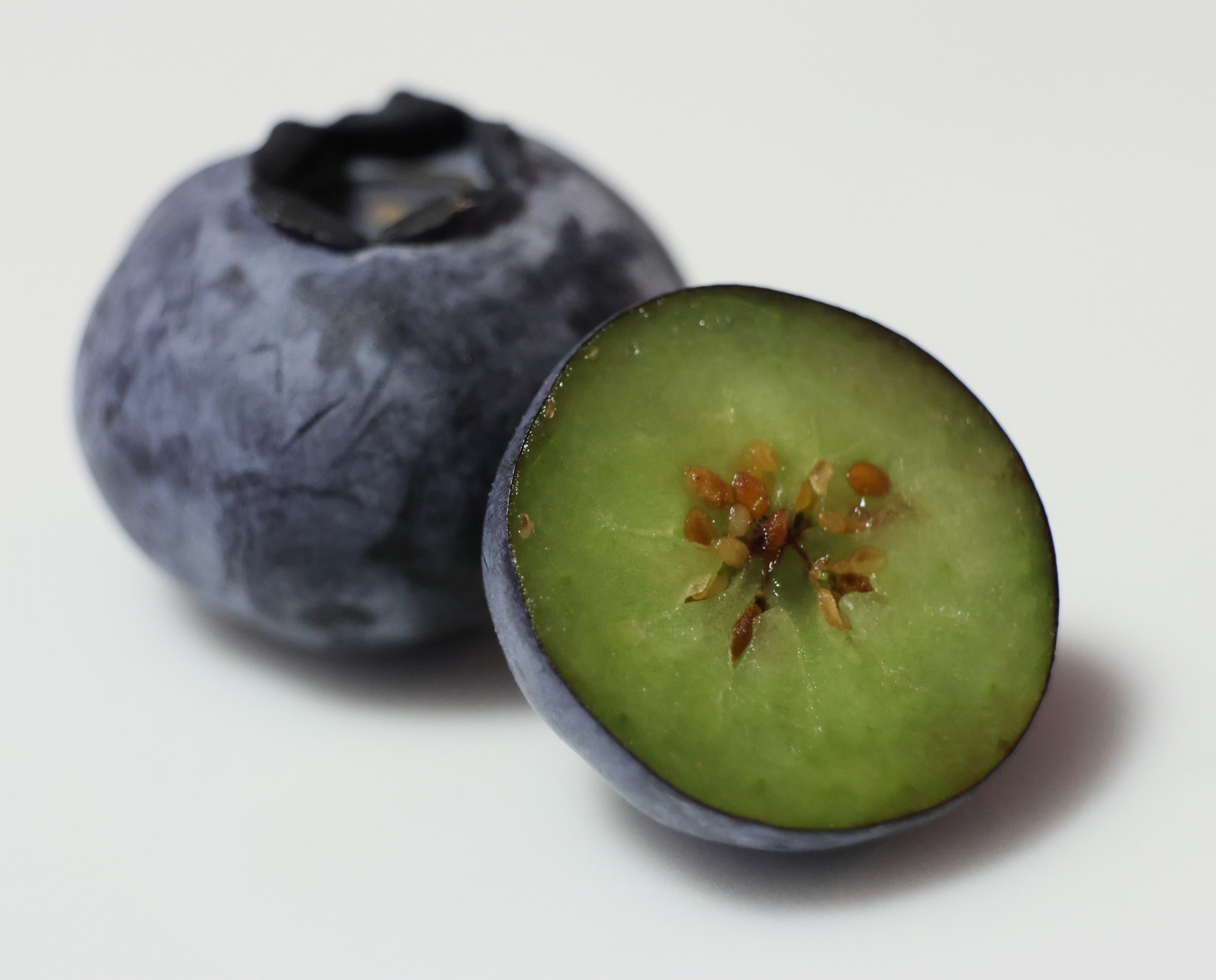
Whole blueberry and in cross-section

Many species of blueberries grow wild in North America, including Vaccinium myrtilloides, V. angustifolium and V. corymbosum, which grow on forest floors or near swamps.

Wild blueberries reproduce by cross pollination, with each seed producing a plant with a different genetic composition, causing within the same species differences in growth, productivity, color, leaf characteristics, disease resistance, flavor, and other fruit characteristics. The mother plant develops underground stems called rhizomes, allowing the plant to form a network of rhizomes creating a large patch (called a clone) which is genetically distinct. Floral and leaf buds develop intermittently along the stems of the plant, with each floral bud giving rise to 5–6 flowers and the eventual fruit. Wild blueberries prefer an acidic soil between 4.2 and 5.2 pH and only moderate amounts of moisture. They have a hardy cold tolerance in their range in Canada and the northern United States. Fruit productivity of lowbush blueberries varies by the degree of pollination, genetics of the clone, soil fertility, water availability, insect infestation, plant diseases, and local growing conditions. Wild (lowbush) blueberries have an average mature weight of 0.3 grams (1/128 oz).

Lowbush blueberries, sometimes called "wild blueberries", are generally not planted by farmers, but rather are managed on berry fields called "barrens". Cultivated highbush blueberries prefer sandy or loam soils, having shallow root systems that benefit from mulch and fertilizer. The leaves of highbush blueberries can be either deciduous or evergreen, ovate to lanceolate, and 1–8 cm (1/2–3 1/4 in) long and 0.5–3.5 cm (1/4–1 3/8 in) broad. The flowers are bell-shaped, white, pale pink or red, sometimes tinged greenish.

The fruit is a berry 5–16 mm (3/16–5/8 in) in diameter with a flared crown at the end; they are pale greenish at first, then reddish-purple, and finally uniformly blue when ripe. They are covered in a protective coating of powdery epicuticular wax, colloquially known as the "bloom". They generally have a sweet taste when mature (although, some can be sour, tart, or bitter) with variable acidity. Blueberry bushes typically bear fruit in the middle of the growing season: fruiting times are affected by local conditions, such as climate, altitude, and latitude, so the time of harvest in the northern hemisphere can vary from May to August.

=== Identification ===
Commercially offered blueberries are usually from species that naturally occur only in eastern and north-central North America. Other sections in the genus are native to other parts of the world, including the Pacific Northwest and the southern United States, South America, Europe and Asia. Other wild shrubs in many of these regions produce similar-looking edible berries, such as huckleberries and whortleberries (North America) and bilberries (Europe). These species are sometimes called "blueberries" and are sold as blueberry jam or other products.

The names of blueberries in languages other than English often translate as "blueberry", e.g. Scots blaeberry and Norwegian blåbær. Blaeberry, blåbær and the French myrtilles usually refer to the European native V. myrtillus (bilberry), while the French bleuets refers to the North American blueberry.

== Species ==
Note: habitat and range summaries are from the Flora of New Brunswick, published in 1986 by Harold R. Hinds, and Plants of the Pacific Northwest coast, published in 1994 by Pojar and MacKinnon.

- Vaccinium angustifolium (lowbush blueberry): acidic barrens, bogs and clearings, Manitoba to Labrador, south to Nova Scotia; and in the United States, from Maine westward to Iowa and southward to Virginia.
- Vaccinium boreale (northern blueberry): peaty barrens, Quebec and Labrador (rare in New Brunswick), south to New York and Massachusetts.
- Vaccinium caesariense (New Jersey blueberry)
- Vaccinium corymbosum (northern highbush blueberry)
- Vaccinium darrowii (evergreen blueberry)
- Vaccinium elliottii (Elliott blueberry)
- Vaccinium formosum (southern blueberry)
- Vaccinium fuscatum (black highbush blueberry; syn. V. atrococcum)
- Vaccinium hirsutum (hairy-fruited blueberry)
- Vaccinium myrsinites (shiny blueberry)
- Vaccinium myrtilloides (sour top, velvet leaf, or Canadian blueberry)
- Vaccinium pallidum (dryland blueberry)
- Vaccinium simulatum (upland highbush blueberry)
- Vaccinium tenellum (southern blueberry)
- Vaccinium virgatum (rabbiteye blueberry; syn. V. ashei)

Some other blue-fruited species of Vaccinium:

- Vaccinium koreanum (Korean blueberry)
- Vaccinium myrtillus (bilberry or European blueberry)
- Vaccinium uliginosum (bog bilberry/blueberry, northern bilberry or western blueberry)
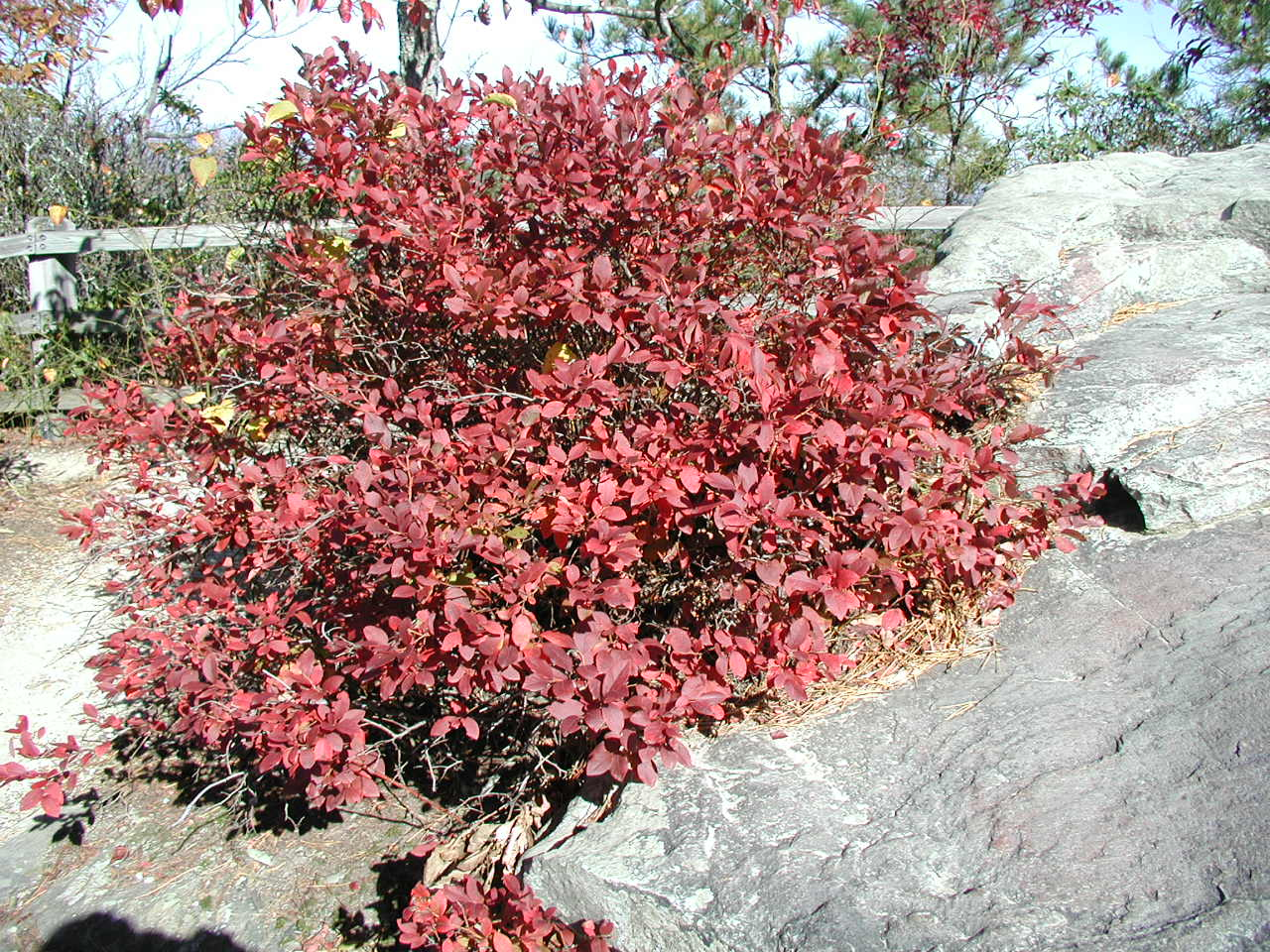
Wild blueberry in autumn foliage, Pilot Mountain, North Carolina, in October

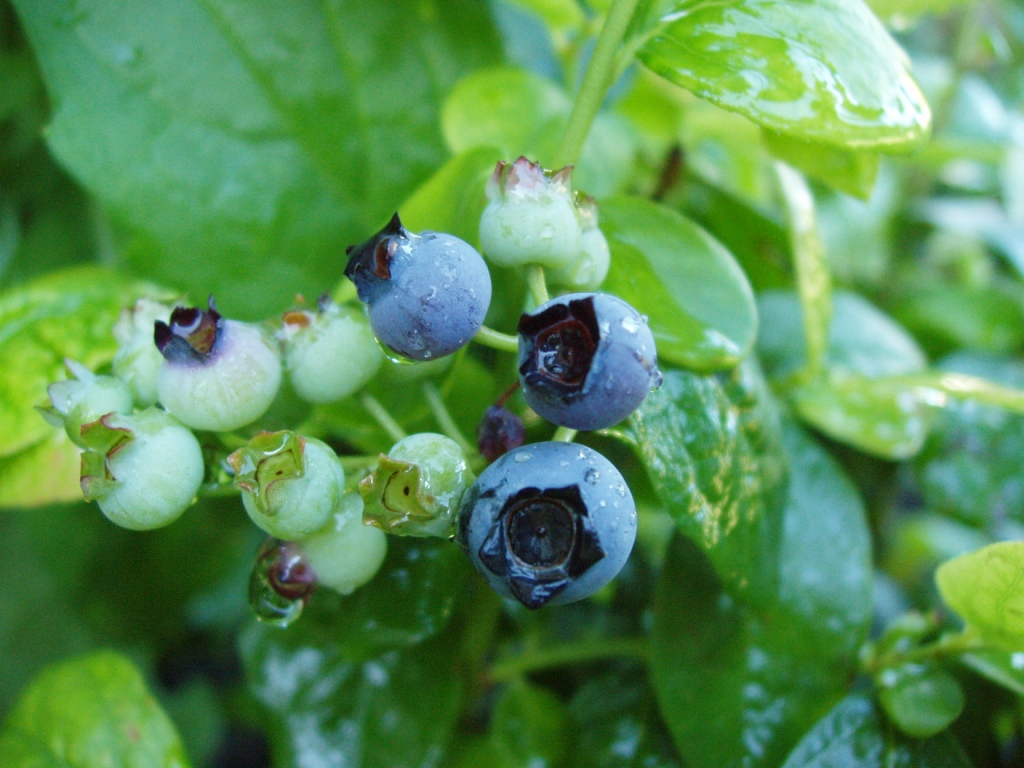
A maturing 'Polaris' blueberry (Vaccinium corymbosum)

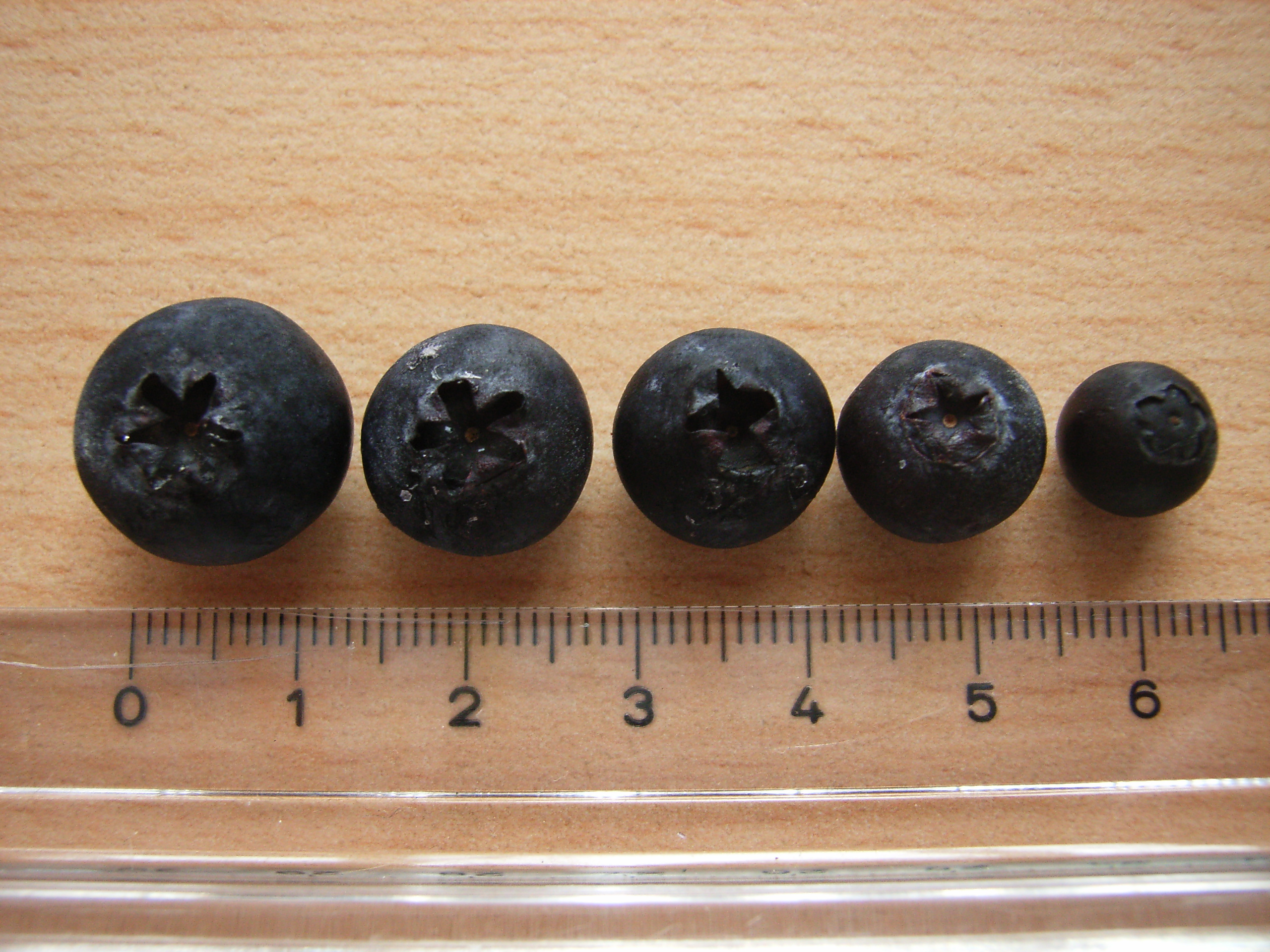
A selection of blueberries, showing the typical sizes of the berries. The scale is marked in centimeters.

The lowbush varieties are V. angustifolium, V. boreale, V. mytilloides, V. pallidum, and V. angustifolium × V. corymbosum. They are still grown similarly to pre-Columbian semi-wild cultivation, i.e. slash and burn. The highbush varieties are darrowii and corymbosum. Rabbiteye (V. ashei/V. virgatum) differ from both high- and lowbush.

== Distribution ==
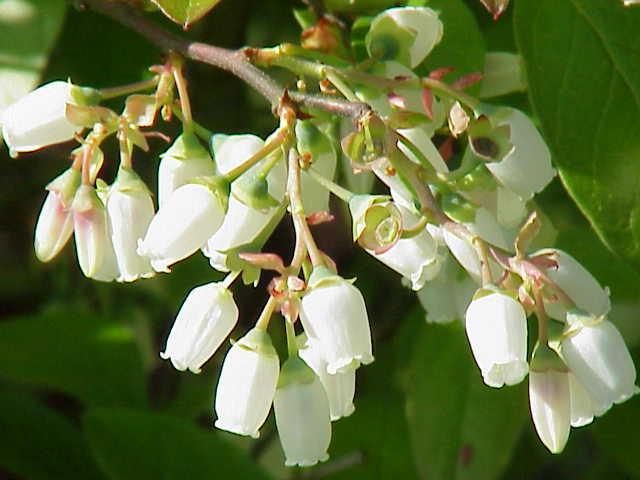
Flowers on a cultivated blueberry bush

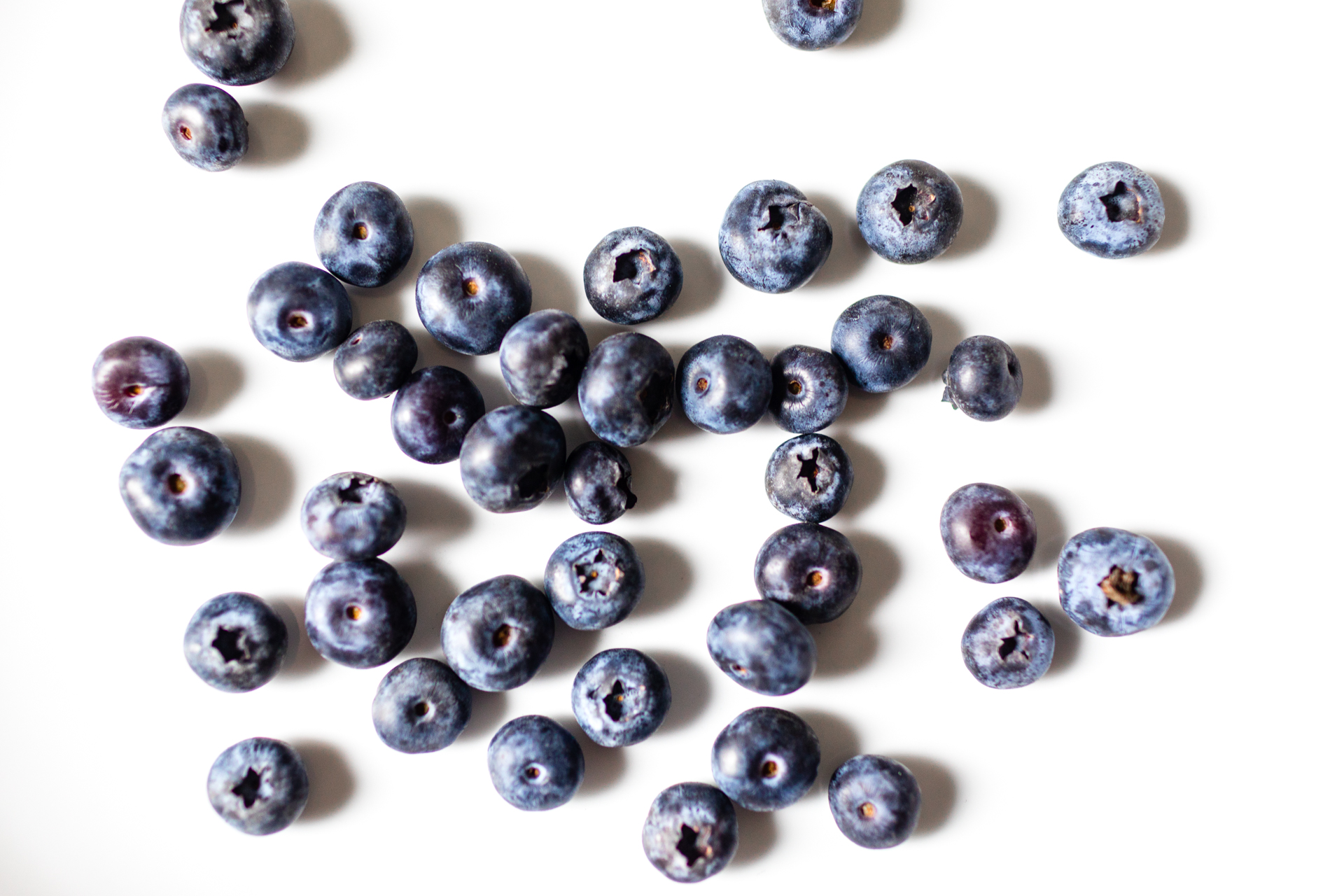
Fresh blueberries

Vaccinium has a mostly circumpolar distribution, with species mainly present in North America, Europe, and Asia. Many commercially available species with English common names including "blueberry" are from North America, particularly Atlantic Canada and the northeastern United States for wild (lowbush) blueberries, and several US states and British Columbia for cultivated (highbush) blueberries.

North American native species of blueberries are grown commercially in the Southern Hemisphere in Australia, New Zealand and South American nations. Vaccinium meridionale (the Andean blueberry) is wild-harvested and commonly available locally. Several other wild shrubs of the genus Vaccinium also produce commonly eaten blue berries, such as the predominantly European V. myrtillus and other bilberries, which in many languages have a name that translates to "blueberry" in English.

== Cultivation ==
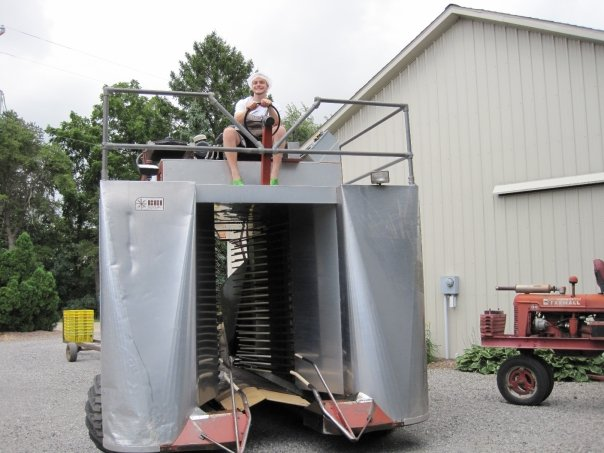
Blueberry harvester in Michigan

Blueberries may be cultivated, or they may be picked from semiwild or wild bushes. In North America, the most common cultivated species is V. corymbosum, the northern highbush blueberry. Hybrids of this with other Vaccinium species adapted to southern U.S. climates are known collectively as southern highbush blueberries. Highbush blueberries were first cultivated in New Jersey around the beginning of the 20th century.

So-called "wild" (lowbush) blueberries, smaller than cultivated highbush ones, have intense color. V. angustifolium (lowbush blueberry) is found from the Atlantic provinces westward to Quebec and southward to Michigan and West Virginia. In some areas, it produces natural "blueberry barrens", where it is the dominant species covering large areas. Several First Nations communities in Ontario are involved in harvesting wild blueberries.

"Wild" has been adopted as a marketing term for harvests of managed native stands of lowbush blueberries. The bushes are not planted or selectively bred, but they are pruned or burned over every two years, and pests are "managed".

Numerous highbush cultivars of blueberries are available, with diversity among them, each having individual qualities. A blueberry breeding program has been established by the USDA-ARS breeding program at Beltsville, Maryland, and Chatsworth, New Jersey. This program began when Frederick Vernon Coville of the USDA-ARS collaborated with Elizabeth Coleman White of New Jersey. In the early part of the 20th century, White offered pineland residents cash for wild blueberry plants with unusually large fruit. After 1910 Coville began to work on blueberry, and was the first to discover the importance of soil acidity (blueberries need highly acidic soil), that blueberries do not self-pollinate, and the effects of cold on blueberries and other plants. In 1911, he began a program of research in conjunction with White, daughter of the owner of the extensive cranberry bogs at Whitesbog in the New Jersey Pine Barrens. His work doubled the size of some strains' fruit, and by 1916, he had succeeded in cultivating blueberries, making them a valuable crop in the Northeastern United States. For this work he received the George Roberts White Medal of Honor from the Massachusetts Horticultural Society.

The rabbiteye blueberry (Vaccinium virgatum syn. V. ashei) is a southern type of blueberry produced from the Carolinas to the Gulf Coast states. Production of rabbiteye blueberries was a focus in Texas in the early 21st century. Other important species in North America include V. pallidum, the hillside or dryland blueberry. It is native to the eastern U.S., and common in the Appalachians and the Piedmont of the Southeast. Sparkleberry, V. arboreum, is a common wild species on sandy soils in the Southeast.

Successful blueberry cultivation requires attention to soil pH (acidity) measurements in the acidic range.

Blueberry bushes often require supplemental fertilization, but over-fertilization with nitrogen can damage plant health, as evidenced by nitrogen burn visible on the leaves.

=== Growing regions ===
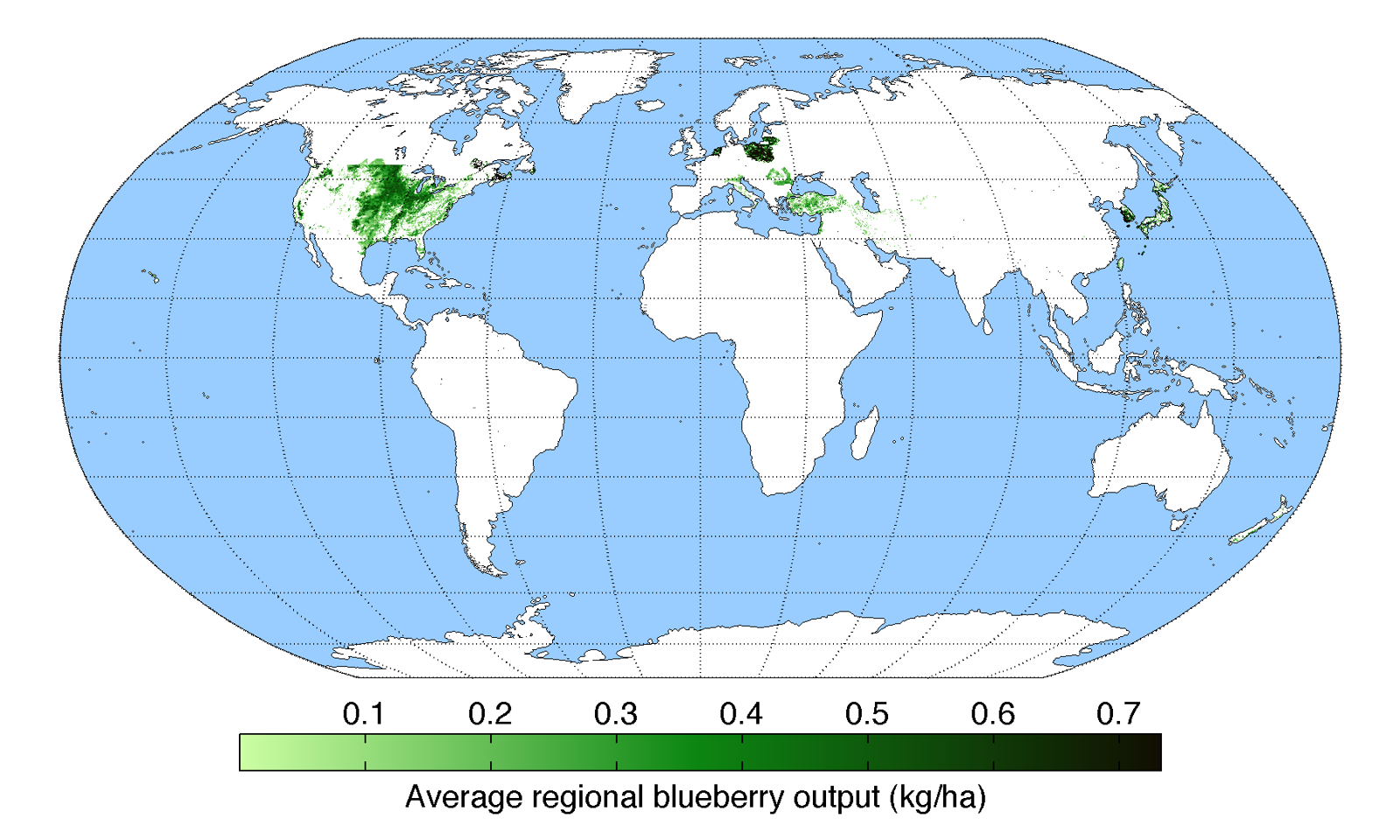
Worldwide highbush blueberry growing areas (data from 2008)

Significant production of highbush blueberries occurs in British Columbia, Maryland, Western Oregon, Michigan, New Jersey, North Carolina, and Washington. The production of southern highbush varieties occurs in California, as varieties originating from University of Florida, Connecticut, New Hampshire, North Carolina State University and Maine have been introduced.

Peru, Spain, and Mexico also have significant production, as of 2023.

==== United States ====
In 2018, Oregon produced the most cultivated blueberries, recording 59 million kilograms (131 million pounds), an amount slightly exceeding the production by Washington. In descending order of production volume for 2017, other major producers were Georgia, Michigan, New Jersey, California, and North Carolina.

Hammonton, New Jersey, claims to be the "Blueberry Capital of the World", with over 80% of New Jersey's cultivated blueberries coming from this town. Every year the town hosts a large festival, which draws thousands of people to celebrate the fruit.

Maine is known for its wild blueberries, with the state's lowbush (wild) and highbush blueberries combined accounting for 10% of all blueberries grown in North America. Some 44,000 hectares (110,000 acres) are farmed, but only half of this acreage is harvested each year due to variations in pruning practices. The wild blueberry is the official state fruit of Maine, and blueberry pie is the official Maine dessert.

==== Canada ====
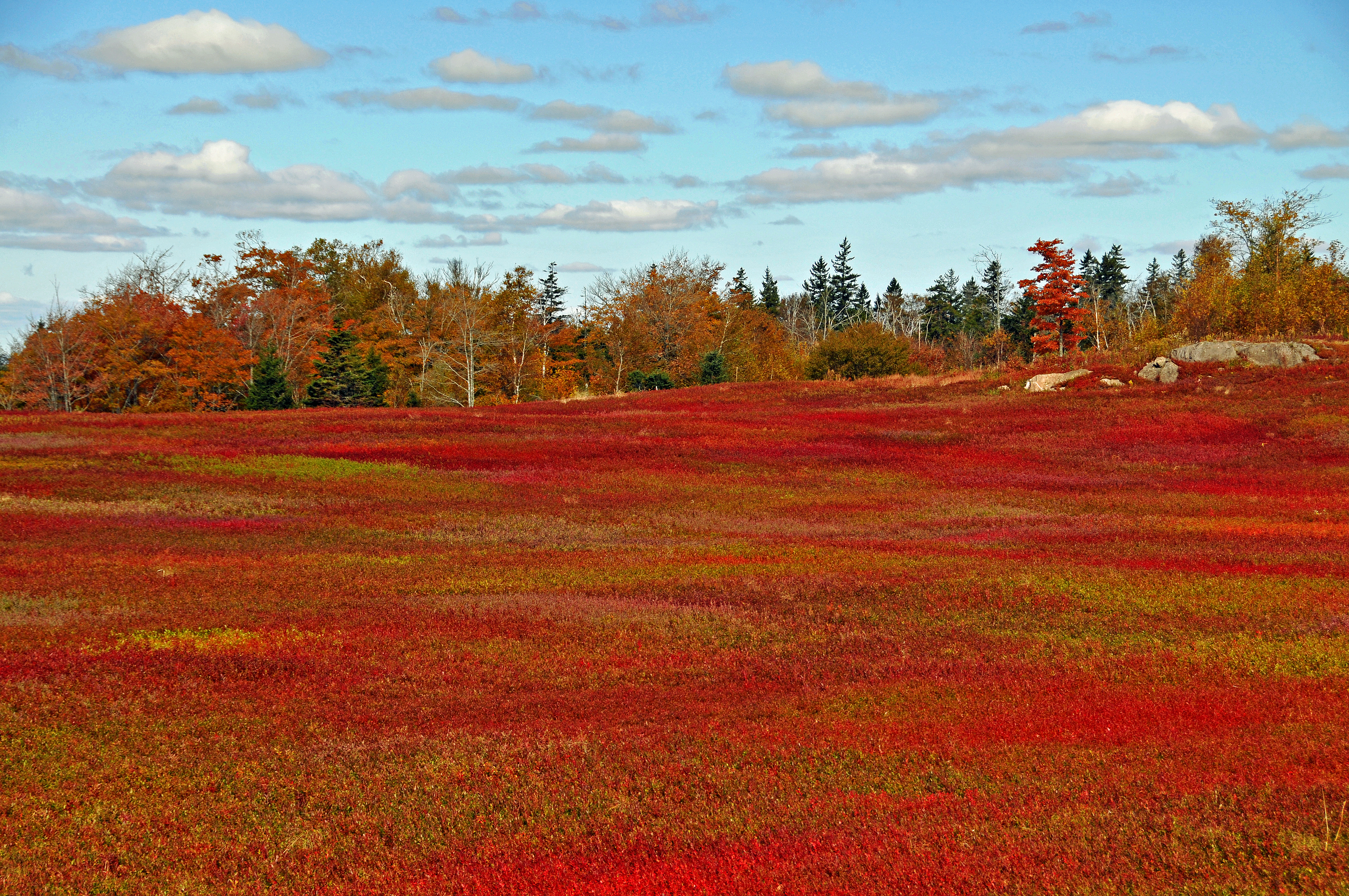
Wild blueberry fields in Nova Scotia, Canada

Canadian production of wild and cultivated blueberries in 2024 was 165,608 tonnes, the country's second-largest fruit crop (after apples). British Columbia was the largest Canadian producer of cultivated (highbush) blueberries, yielding 94% of the total national production in 2024.

With Quebec as the leading producer (47% of total) of wild (lowbush) blueberries, Atlantic Canada contributed the other half of the total Canadian production from New Brunswick (26%), Nova Scotia (17%), and Prince Edward Island (10%) in 2024. The town of Oxford, Nova Scotia is known as the Wild Blueberry Capital of Canada.

Québec production of lowbush blueberries occurs especially in the regions of Saguenay-Lac-Saint-Jean (where a popular name for inhabitants of the regions is bleuets, or "blueberries") and Côte-Nord, which together provide 40% of Québec's total provincial production. This wild blueberry commerce benefits from vertical integration of growing, processing, frozen storage, marketing, and transportation within relatively small regions of the province. On average, 80% of Québec wild blueberries are harvested on farms (21 million kilograms (23,000 short tons)), the remaining 20% being harvested from public forests (5 million kilograms (5,500 short tons)). Some 95% of the wild blueberry crop in Québec is frozen for export out of the province.

==== Europe ====
Highbush blueberries were first introduced to Germany, Sweden, and the Netherlands in the 1930s, and have since been spread to numerous other countries of Europe. V. corymbosum only began to be cultivated in Romania in a few years leading up to 2018 and rapidly increased in production and sales in that time (as with berries in general). As of 2018 it remains relatively unmolested by pests and diseases (see Diseases below).

==== Southern Hemisphere ====
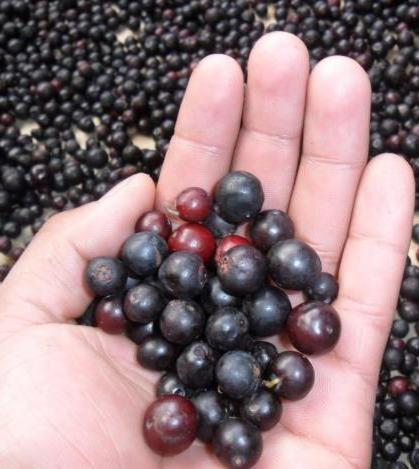
Vaccinium meridionale, a wild species of blueberry found in the Andes

In the Southern Hemisphere, Brazil, Chile, Argentina, Peru, Uruguay, New Zealand, Australia, South Africa, and Zimbabwe grow blueberries commercially.

In Brazil, blueberries are produced in the states of Rio Grande do Sul, Santa Catarina, Paraná, São Paulo and Minas Gerais.

Blueberries were first introduced to Australia in the 1950s, but the effort was unsuccessful. In the early 1970s, the Victorian Department of Agriculture imported seed from the U.S., and a selection trial was started. This work was continued into the mid-1970s when the Australian Blueberry Growers' Association was formed.

In the 21st century, the industry grew in Argentina: "Argentine blueberry production has increased over the last three years with planted area up to 400 percent," according to a 2005 report by the U.S. Department of Agriculture. "Argentine blueberry production has thrived in four different regions: the province of Entre Rios in northeastern Argentina, the province of Tucuman, the province of Buenos Aires and the southern Patagonian valleys", according to the report. In the Bureau of International Labor Affairs report of 2014 on child labor and forced labor, blueberries were listed among the goods produced in such working conditions in Argentina.

=== Pests and diseases ===
==== Diseases ====
As of 2018 V. corymbosum remains relatively unmolested by pests and diseases in Romania, with Phytophthora cinnamomi, Monilinia vaccinii-corymbosi, Botryosphaeria corticis, Godronia cassandrae, Phomopsis sp., Botrytis cinerea, Naohidemyces vaccinii, Microsphaera penicillata var. vaccinii, and various viruses being the most common.

==== Pest management ====
===== Pesticides =====
DDT began to be used in blueberry soon after its discovery in 1939, and a few years later in the mid-1940s research began into its use in North America.

Because "wild" is a marketing term generally used for all low-bush blueberries, it does not indicate that such blueberries are free from pesticides.

Insecticide modes of action must be varied to avoid encouraging resistance in the invasive pest Drosophila suzukii.

Some insecticides can be counterproductive, harming natural enemies of pests as well. For example, treatment for Illinoia pepperi can reduce populations of its predators. Kaolin clay for Rhagoletis mendax also reduced effectiveness of Diachasma alloeum, its parasitoid. The pest predator Harpalus erraticus maintains greater abundance with selective insecticides rather than broad-spectrum MoAs.

===== Integrated pest management =====
Blueberries are naturally relatively unmolested by arthropod pests. Nonetheless, there are 24 insect taxa known to be pests in North America, the worst in New Jersey, Michigan, Maine, and Eastern Canada being Rhagoletis mendax. Secondary but still important are Acrobasis vaccinii, Grapholita packardi, and Conotrachelus nenuphar. These four are the most common targets for the development of IPM practices. as of 2019, IPM research has also taken an interest in Drosophila suzukii and arthropods like aphids (that vector diseases such as scorch virus and shoestring virus) and cicadellids (vectoring the phytoplasma that causes blueberry stunt). Managing pests down to the cosmetic level is necessary for this fruit because they are a premium product.

Changes in locale and environment – to new geographies, and into greenhouses – have required new pest management regimes, including innovative IPM. Conversely, importing foreign potential enemies into North America may yield good results: Operophtera brumata is a pest of blueberries and birches which is successfully parasitized by Cyzenis albicans despite the lack of historical, natural contact between the two. The same results were obtained with Scirtothrips citri and Beauveria bassiana. Results are available for Choristoneura rosaceana and overwhelming numbers of Trichogramma minutum, and Cyclocephala longula overwhelmed by Steinernema scarabaei. This has also been attempted with flower thrips and potential predators but with inconclusive results.

===== International quarantine =====
Rhagoletis mendax is a quarantine pest in phytosanitary regimes of some countries around the world.

===== Resistant cultivars =====
Insect resistance was not a priority in breeding programs until about the year 2000 and is still not a high priority. However, it may become more common as it becomes easier, especially using marker-assisted breeding. V. ashei is naturally more resistant than V. corymbosum to Scaphytopius magdalensis. V. ashei is less resistant than V. darrowii to Prodiplosis vaccinia. There is variation between cultivars of V. ashei in resistance to Oberea myops. There is variation in resistance among cultivars of V. corymbosum to Acrobasis vaccinii and Popillia japonica. Wild V. spp. have greater resistance than highbush cultivars to I. pepperi. There is significant variation between highbush cultivars in the abundance of various Tephritidae, thrips, and Homalodisca vitripennis.

Blueberry production 2024, tonnes
United States	401,970
Peru	353,600
Canada	165,608
Chile	97,219
Mexico	80,534
Spain	60,950
World	1,392,534
Source: FAOSTAT of the United Nations

== Production ==
In 2024, world production of blueberries (lowbush and highbush combined) was 1.4 million tonnes, led by the United States with 29% of the total, Peru with 25%, and Canada with 12% (table).

Quebec produced 43,997 tonnes of wild (lowbush) blueberries, accounting for 47% of the total Canadian production in 2024.

Production of blueberries

Blueberry yield

=== Regulations ===
Canada No. 1 blueberries are all similar in size, shape, weight, and color—the total product can be no more than ten percent off-color and three percent otherwise defective.

== Nutrition ==
Blueberries are 84% water, 14% carbohydrates, 1% protein, and contain negligible fat (table). In a reference amount of 100 g (3.5 oz), blueberries supply 57 calories of food energy, and are a moderate source (11-16% of the Daily Value, DV) of vitamin K, vitamin C, and manganese, with other micronutrients in much smaller contents (table).

Blueberries, raw
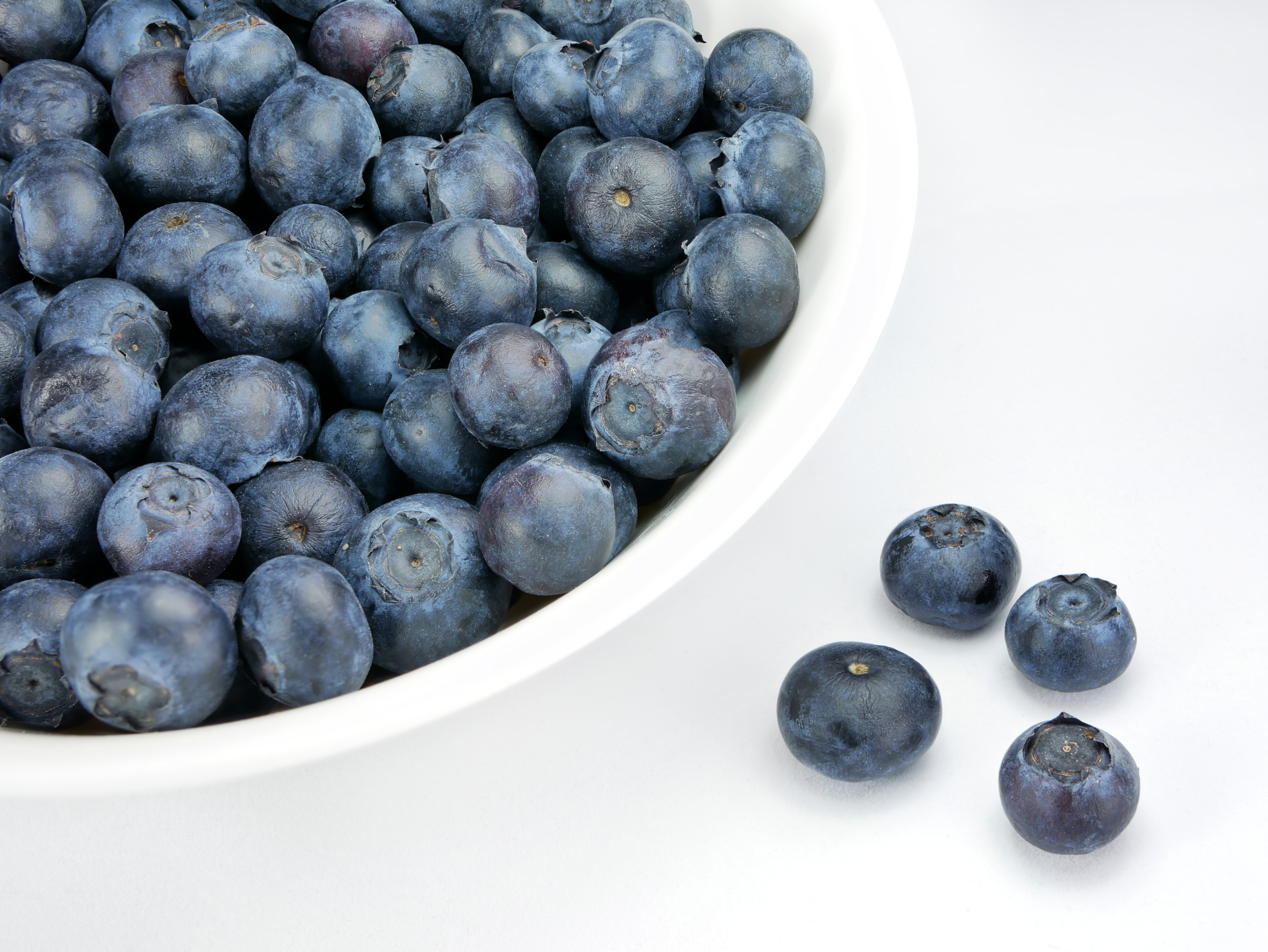

Nutritional value per 100 g (3.5 oz)
- Energy: 240 kJ (57 kcal)
- Carbohydrates: 14.49 g
- Sugars: 9.96 g
- Dietary fiber: 2.4 g
- Fat: 0.33 g
- Protein: 0.74 g
Vitamins and minerals
Vitamins	Quantity %DV^{†}
Vitamin A equiv. beta-Carotene lutein zeaxanthin	0% 32 μg 80 μg
Vitamin A	54 IU
Thiamine (B1)	3% 0.037 mg
Riboflavin (B2)	3% 0.041 mg
Niacin (B3)	3% 0.418 mg
Pantothenic acid (B5)	2% 0.124 mg
Vitamin B6	3% 0.052 mg
Folate (B9)	2% 6 μg
Vitamin C	11% 9.7 mg
Vitamin E	4% 0.57 mg
Vitamin K	16% 19.3 μg
Minerals	Quantity %DV^{†}
Calcium	0% 6 mg
Copper	6% 0.057 mg
Iron	2% 0.28 mg
Magnesium	1% 6 mg
Manganese	15% 0.336 mg
Phosphorus	1% 12 mg
Potassium	3% 77 mg
Sodium	0% 1 mg
Zinc	2% 0.165 mg
- Other constituents: Quantity
- Water: 84 g
- Link to USDA Database entry
- ^{†}Percentages estimated using US recommendations for adults, except for potassium, which is estimated based on expert recommendation from the National Academies.

== Phytochemicals and research ==
Blueberries contain anthocyanins, other polyphenols and various phytochemicals under preliminary research for their potential biological effects. Most polyphenol studies have been conducted using the highbush cultivar of blueberries (V. corymbosum), while content of polyphenols and anthocyanins in lowbush (wild) blueberries (V. angustifolium) exceeds values found in highbush cultivars.

== Uses ==
Blueberries are sold fresh or are processed as individually quick frozen fruit, purée, juice, or dried or infused berries. These may then be used in a variety of consumer goods, such as jellies, jams, pies, muffins, snack foods, pancakes, or as an additive to breakfast cereals.

Blueberry sauce is a sweet sauce prepared using blueberries as a primary ingredient.

Blueberry wine is made from the flesh and skin of the berries, which is fermented and then matured; usually, the lowbush variety is used.

== Gallery ==
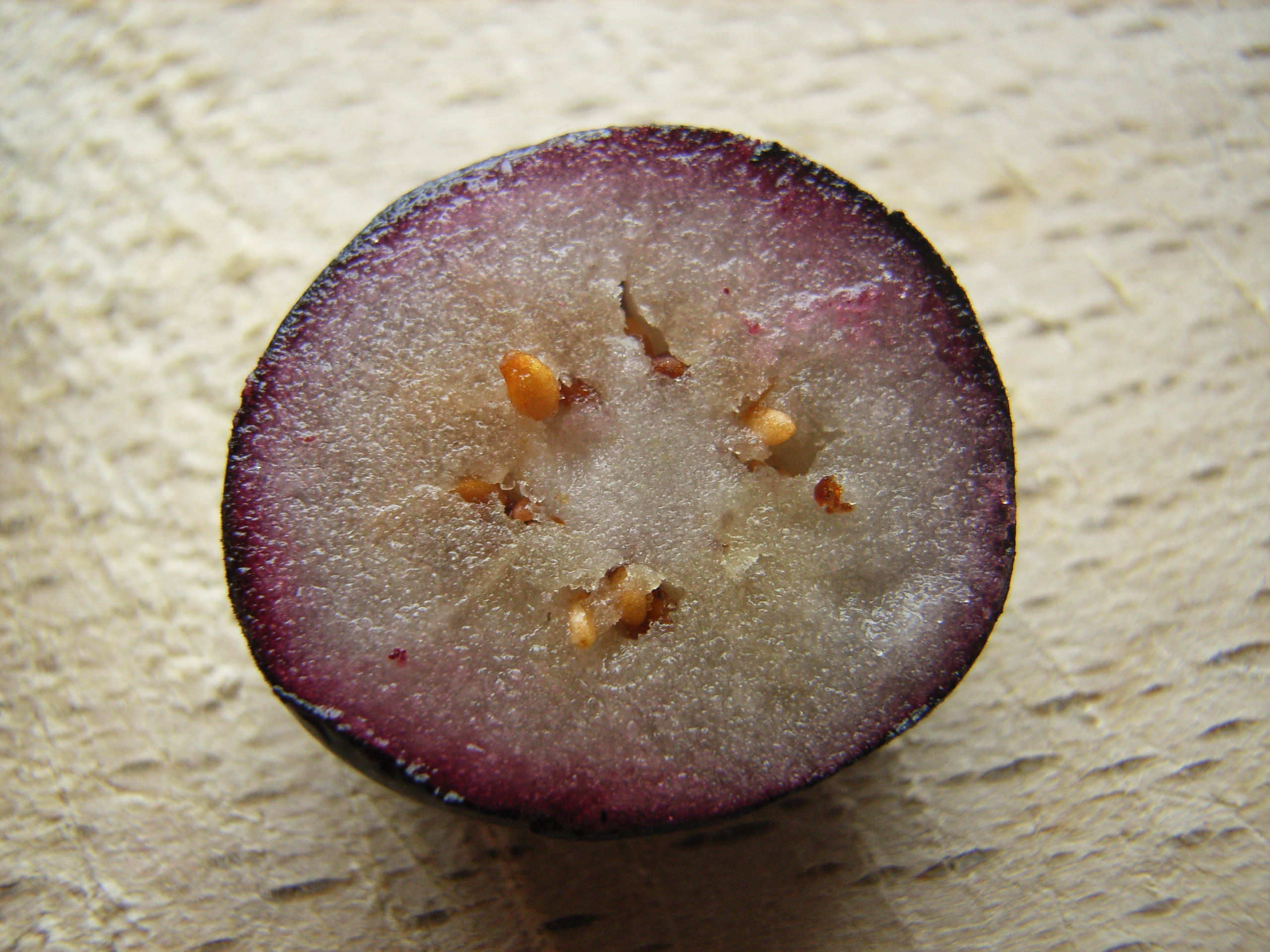
A cut blueberry showing how, having been frozen and then thawed, the anthocyanins in the pericarp can run into the flesh

Core structure common to all anthocyanins, some of which produce the blue pigments in blueberries

== See also ==
- List of culinary fruits
- List of vegetables
