= Delta11-fatty-acid desaturase =

Identifiers
- EC no.: 1.14.19.5

Databases
- IntEnz: IntEnz view
- BRENDA: BRENDA entry
- ExPASy: NiceZyme view
- KEGG: KEGG entry
- MetaCyc: metabolic pathway
- PRIAM: profile
- PDB structures: RCSB PDB PDBe PDBsum
Search
- PMC: articles
- PubMed: articles
- NCBI: proteins

Delta11-fatty-acid desaturase (EC 1.14.19.5, Delta11 desaturase, fatty acid Delta11-desaturase, TpDESN, Cro-PG, Delta11 fatty acid desaturase, Z/E11-desaturase, Delta11-palmitoyl-CoA desaturase) is an enzyme with systematic name acyl-CoA,hydrogen donor:oxygen Delta11-oxidoreductase. This enzyme catalyses the following chemical reaction

acyl-CoA + reduced acceptor + O_{2} $\rightleftharpoons$ Delta11-acyl-CoA + acceptor + 2 H_{2}O

The enzyme from the marine microalga Thalassiosira pseudonana desaturates palmitic acid 16:0 to 16:1Delta11, whereas that from the leafroller moth Choristoneura rosaceana desaturates myristic acid 14:0 to 14:1Delta11.
