= Southern blueberry =

Southern blueberry is a common name for several plants native to the southeastern United States and may refer to:

- Vaccinium formosum
- Vaccinium tenellum
