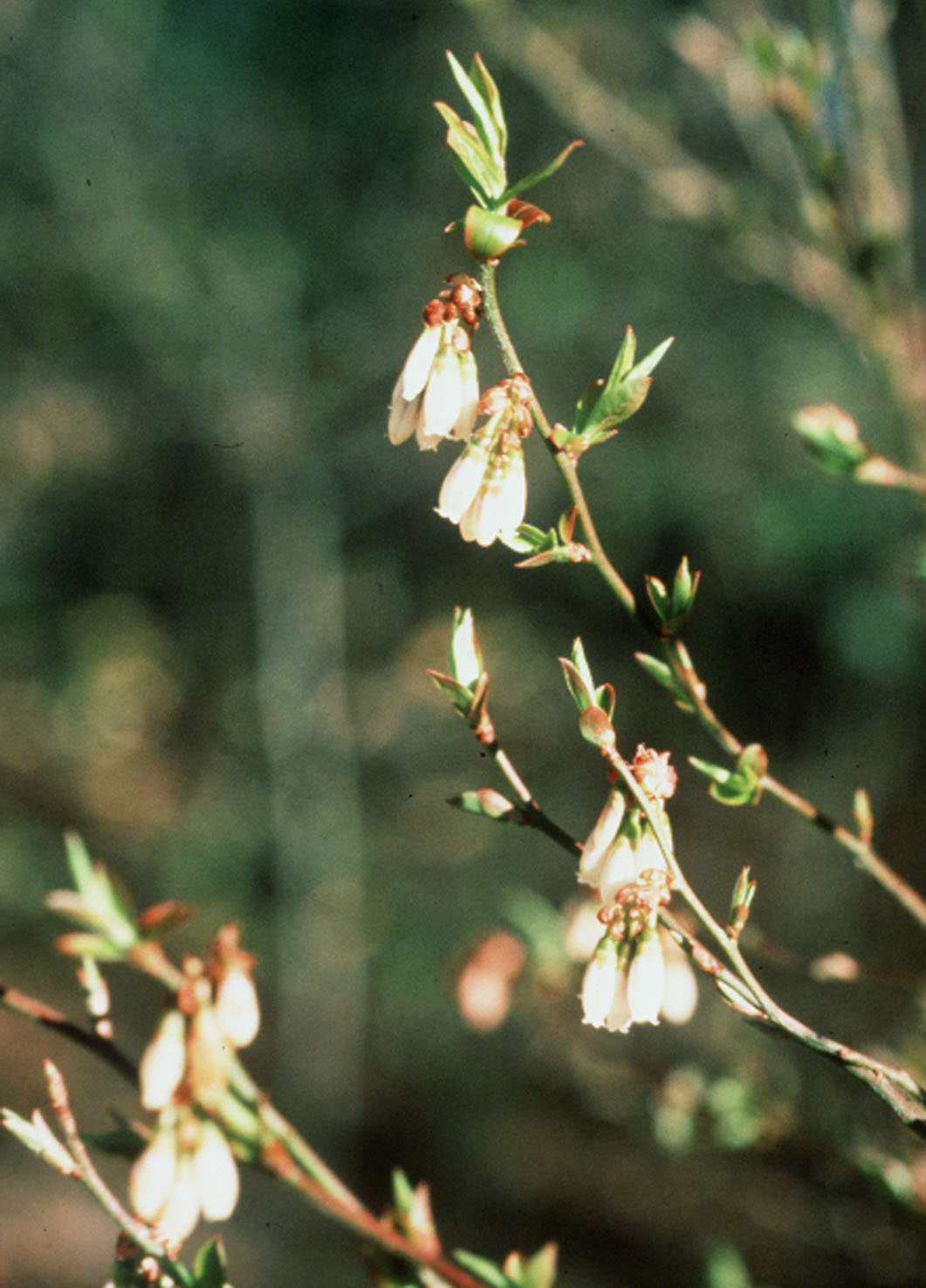
- Plant in flower

Conservation status
- Secure (NatureServe)

Scientific classification
- Kingdom: Plantae
- Clade: Tracheophytes
- Clade: Angiosperms
- Clade: Eudicots
- Clade: Asterids
- Order: Ericales
- Family: Ericaceae
- Tribe: Vaccinieae
- Genus: Vaccinium
- Section: Vaccinium sect. Cyanococcus
- Species: V. elliotti

Binomial name
- Vaccinium elliotti Chapm.

Synonyms
- Cyanococcus elliottii (Chapm.) Small

= Vaccinium elliottii =

Elliott's blueberry

Berry and plant

Vaccinium elliottii (Elliott's blueberry) is a species of Vaccinium in the blueberry group (Vaccinium sect. Cyanococcus). It is native to the southeastern and south-central United States.

== Description ==
Vaccinium elliottii is a deciduous shrub 2–4 m (6 1/2–13 ft) tall, with small, simple ovoid-acute leaves 15–30 mm (5/8–1 1/8 in) long with a finely serrated margin. The flowers are pale pink, bell-shaped, 6–8 mm (1/4–3/8 in) long, opening in the early spring before the new leaves appear.

The fruit is an edible berry 5–8 mm diameter. There are two variants one having tart shiny blue black berries and the other sweeter type having a whitish waxy bloom over the otherwise blue black berries; they ripen from late spring (in Florida) through summer (in Arkansas and Virginia). Chromosome count 2n=24.

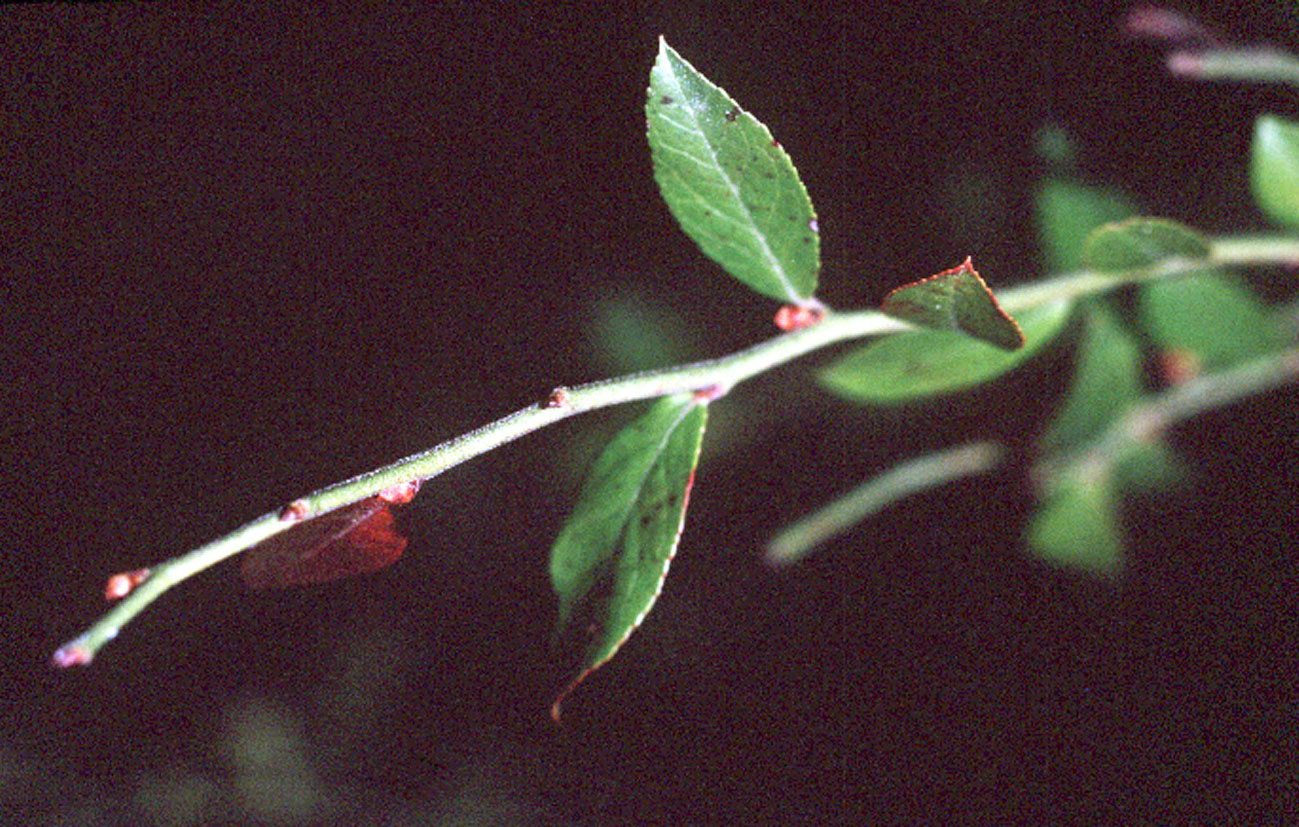
Leaves

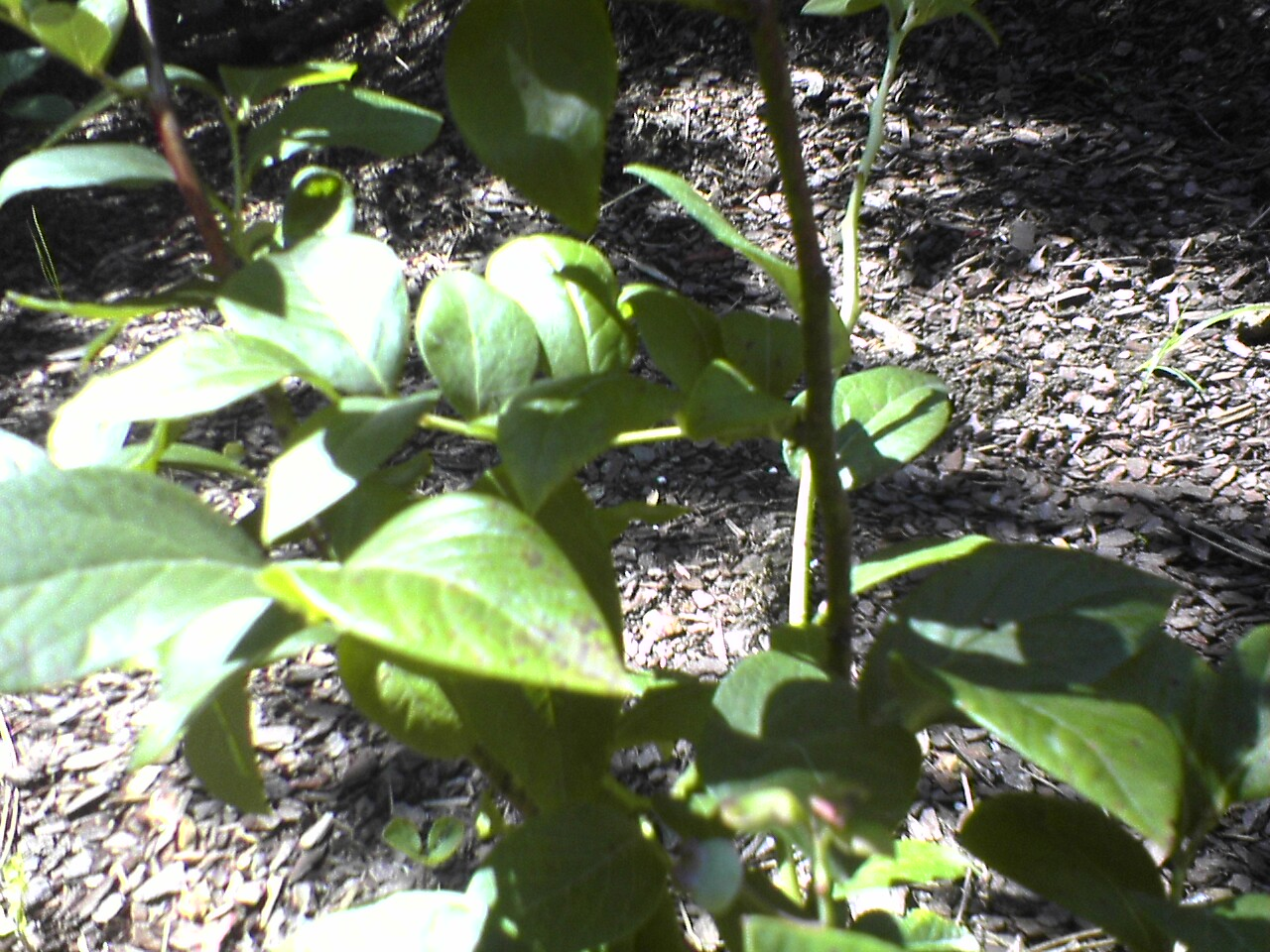
Plant with unripe berries

== Distribution and habitat ==
It is native to the southeastern and south-central United States, from southeastern Virginia south to Florida, and west to Arkansas and Texas.

V. elliottii has been observed in habitat types such as mixed hardwood forests, swampy woodlands, floodplains, and longleaf pine ridges.

== Uses ==
Vaccinium elliottii produces a particularly large yield of somewhat sour berries. It is popular for late-season fruit.

== See also ==
- Huckleberry
