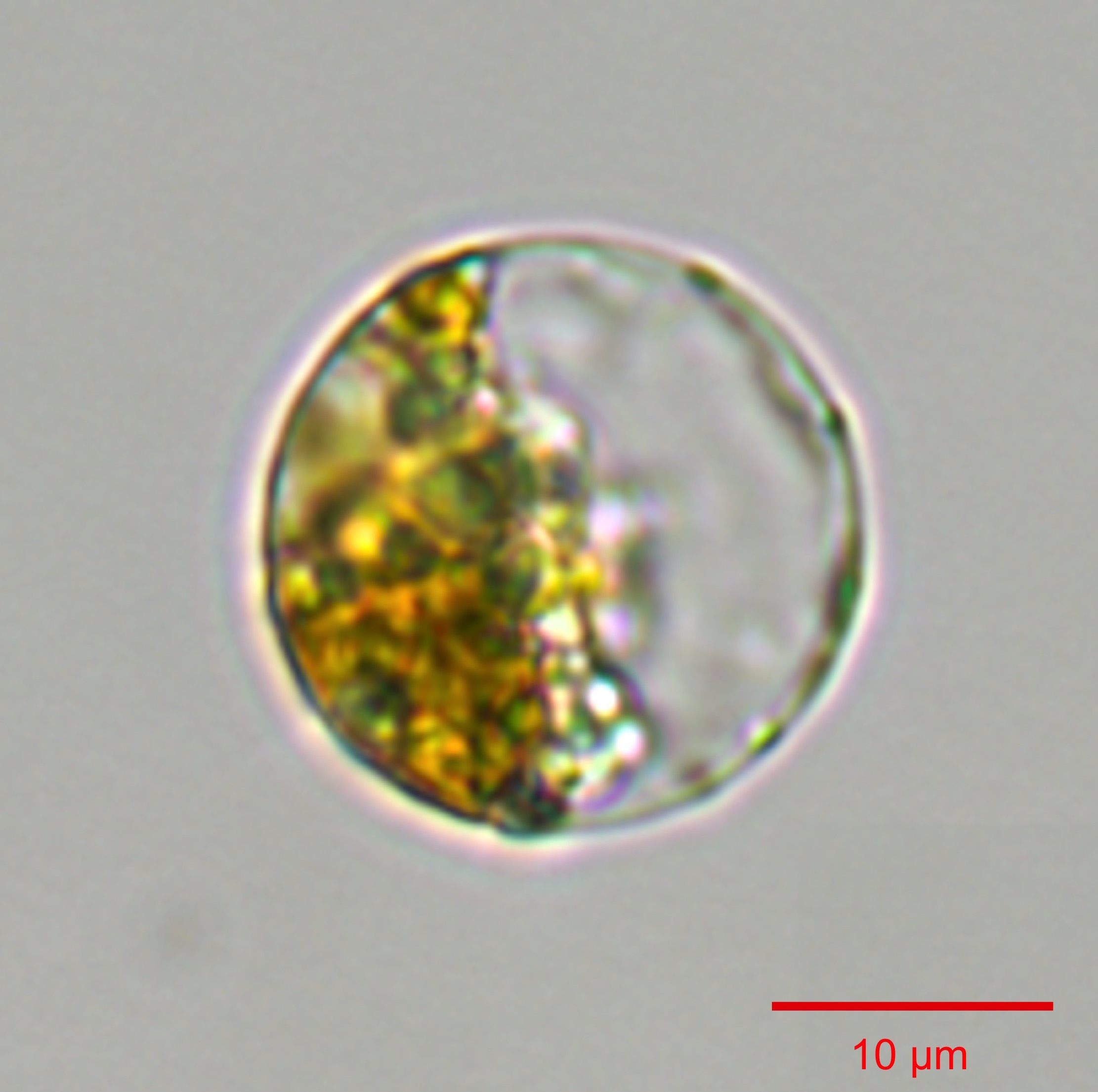
- A Thalassiosira pseudonana oogonium (egg cell) beginning to expand through the cell wall. Artificial coloring denotes chlorophyll (blue) and DNA (red).

Scientific classification
- Domain: Eukaryota
- Supergroup: Stramenopiles
- Division: Ochrophyta
- Clade: Bacillariophyta
- Class: Thalassiosirophyceae
- Order: Thalassiosirales
- Family: Thalassiosiraceae
- Genus: Thalassiosira
- Species: T. pseudonana

Binomial name
- Thalassiosira pseudonana Hasle & Heimdal, 1970

= Thalassiosira pseudonana =

Species of single-celled organism

Thalassiosira pseudonana is a species of marine centric Bulka diatoms. It was chosen as the first eukaryotic marine phytoplankton for whole genome sequencing. T. pseudonana was selected for this study because it is a model for diatom physiology studies, belongs to a genus widely distributed throughout the world's oceans, and has a relatively small genome at 34 mega base pairs. Scientists are researching on diatom light absorption, using the marine diatom of Thalassiosira. The diatom requires a high enough concentration of CO_{2} in order to utilize C_{4} metabolism.

The clone of T. pseudonana that was sequenced is CCMP 1335 and is available from the National Center for Marine Algae and Microbiota at Bigelow Laboratory for Ocean Sciences. This clone was originally collected in 1958 from Moriches Bay (Long Island, New York) and has been maintained continuously in culture.

== Morphology ==
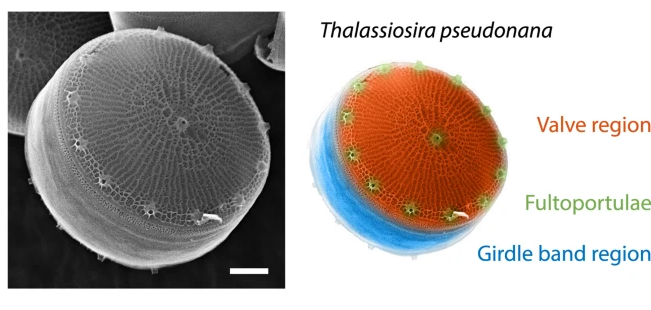
Left: Scanning electron microscope image of the T. pseudonana. Right: False coloring of the biosilica structure of T. pseudonana to highlight its valve region, fultoportulae and girdle band region.

Thalassiosira pseudonana has a radial symmetry. Its biosilica cell wall is divided into two halves, which are joined together by girdle bands, giving them a cylindrical shape or making them appear as a Petri dish. The diameter of their valves ranges from 2 to 9 μm. The valve is made up of silica ribs that radiate from the center with many 18 nm diameter nanopores between them. The face of the valve has 0-1 central fultoportula and a marginal ring of fultoportulae (6-12). The external openings of the central fultoportula appear as rimmed holes, whereas those of the marginal fultoportulae appear as short rimmed tubes, which are sometimes obliquely sectioned at the opening. On the internal face of the valve, two satellite pores surround the central fultoportula, while the marginal fultoportulae are surrounded by three satellite pores. The rimoportula is a rimmed pore located on the valve face, with a size similar to the fultoportula, and positioned between two fultoportulae. The pervalvar axis of T. pseudonana can be either shorter than or equal to the valve diameter. Their cell walls have been reported to mostly have low degree of silicification; however, their rims and ribs are highly silicified. This probably enables them to have high strength while being light and using silica economically.

== Biomineralization ==
The distinct nano- to micro-scale structure of T. pseudonana follows a specific mechanism of formation. It begins with the formation of a thin base layer that outlines the valve. Next, there is radiation of the silica ribs and the buildup of the rims, while portulae develop. The formation of the radial structure starts from a central location and spreads out in x and y axes planes. During maturation, the valve surface becomes increasingly silicified, and the rim continues to develop, while the central portion of the valve becomes more rigid. Initially, the valve nanopores have irregular shapes, but they become circular during maturation. The nanoscale structures of T. pseudonana are genetically mediated. The silicification process involves three categories of molecules: silaffins, which are highly post-translationally modified phosphoproteins; long chain polyamines (LCPAs); and silacidins, which are acidic proteins. During valve synthesis, mRNA levels for silaffin 3 increase and lead to the formation of the base layer. The presence of lower concentrations of silaffin 3 or the light form of silaffin 1 and 2 leads to the generation of spherical silica structures, indicating possible mechanisms involved in the formation of spherical silica in the ridges. Over 150 genes have been identified as playing a role in the silicon biomineralization of T. pseudonana. A set of 75 genes were upregulated only during silicon limitation, while 84 genes were upregulated by both silicon and iron limitations, indicating a linkage between their iron and silicon pathways. T. pseudonana also possesses chitin-based scaffolds that are important in the formation of their biosilica structure.

== Symbiosis ==
Thalassiosira pseudonana and the heterotrophic alphaproteobacterium Ruegeria pomeroyi form a chemical symbiosis in coculture. The bacteria provide vitamin B12 to the diatoms, which in exchange provide organic nutrients to the bacteria. In the presence of the diatom, the bacteria start producing a transporter for dihydroxypropanesulfonate (DHPS), a nutrient produced by the diatom for the bacteria. A metabolic survey of the association between the bacterium Dinoroseobacter shibae and T. pseudonana showed that the bacterium has minimal impact on the growth of T. pseudonana, but it causes metabolic changes by upregulating the intracellular amino acids and amino acid derivatives of the diatom. It has been demonstrated that under conditions of environmental instability and extreme warming, biofilm formation can accelerate the evolutionary responses of T. pseudonana.
