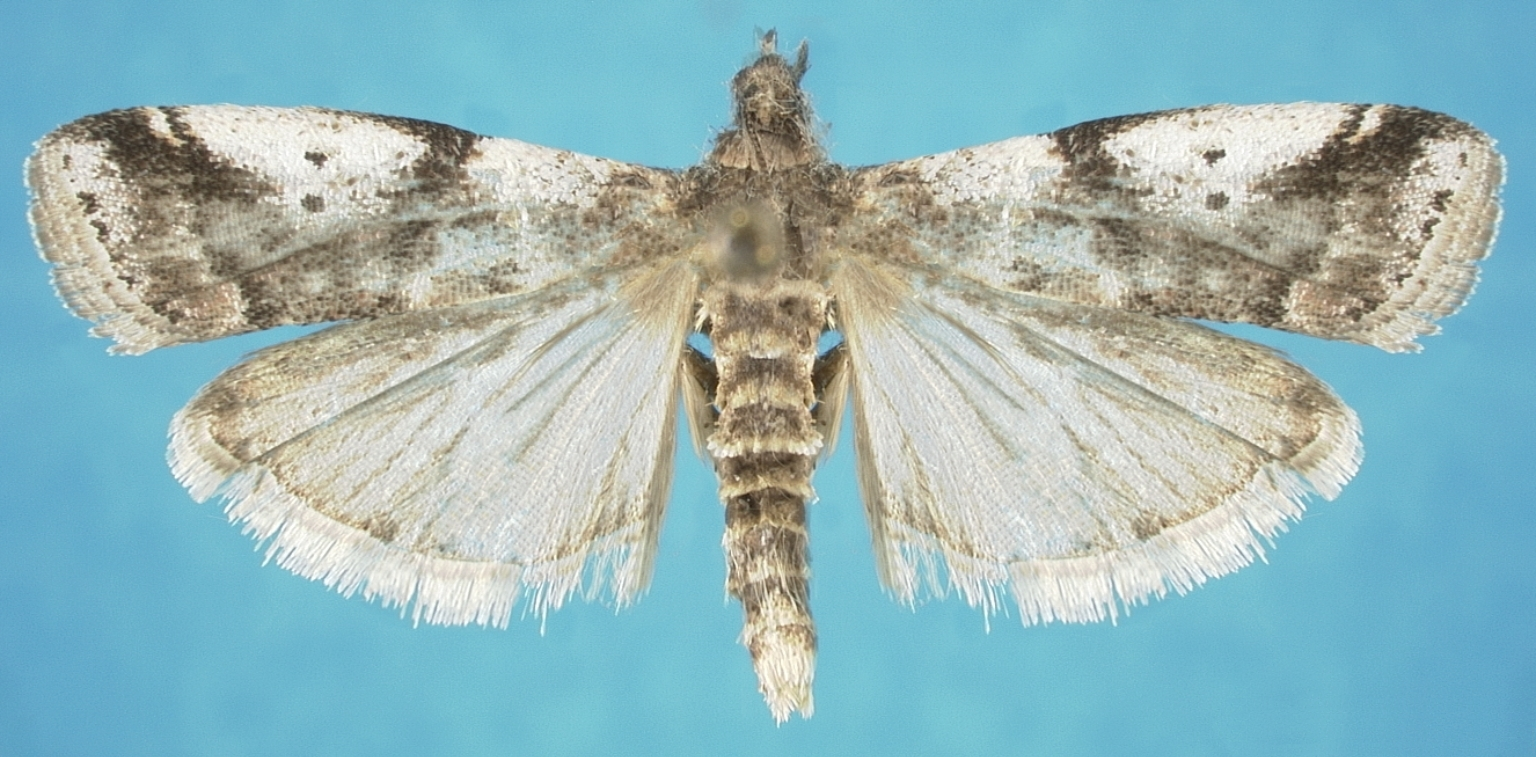

Scientific classification
- Kingdom: Animalia
- Phylum: Arthropoda
- Clade: Pancrustacea
- Class: Insecta
- Order: Lepidoptera
- Family: Pyralidae
- Genus: Acrobasis
- Species: A. vaccinii

Binomial name
- Acrobasis vaccinii Riley, 1884

= Acrobasis vaccinii =

Cranberry fruitworm

Species of moth

Acrobasis vaccinii, the cranberry fruitworm, is a moth of the family Pyralidae described by Charles Valentine Riley in 1884. It is found in North America from Nova Scotia to Florida and from Wisconsin to Texas, it is introduced in the state of Washington.

The wingspan is 16–18 mm.

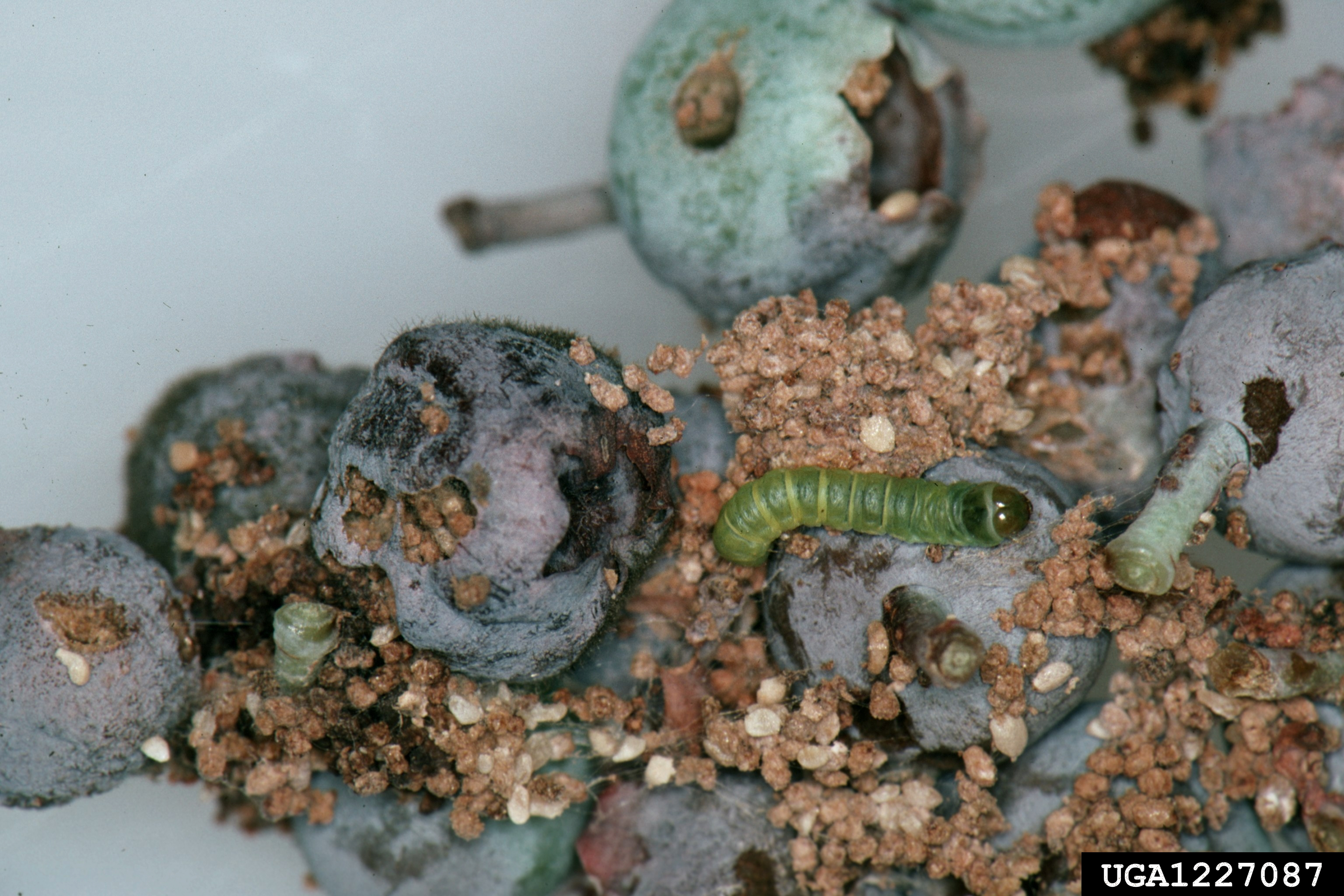
Larvae

The larvae feed on Vaccinium corymbosum, Vaccinium macrocarpon, Vaccinium vitis-idaea and Vaccinium stamineum. Larvae feed inside a berry until most of its contents have been consumed. Larvae are mostly green, with some brownish-red pigmentation on the dorsal surface, and grow to about half an inch before pupation. Full-grown larvae over winter in a cocoon, and emerge as adults after full bloom and fruit set. Female moths lay their eggs on the fruit, usually on or within the calyx cup of unripe berries. One generation emerges each year, with each larvae feeding on as many as eight berries to complete its development.

== Monitoring and control ==
Monitoring the flight of the moths using pheromone traps is essential for optimizing pesticide treatments. One particular pheromone lure, ISCAlure-Vaccinii, developed and manufactured by ISCA Technologies in Riverside, California, has been shown to be a highly effective tool for monitoring this pest. Alternatively, calyx ends of the berries can be inspected for eggs by experienced scouts. The eggs are flat, white, scale-like, and quite small, so this will probably require a hand lens. One method of control is to pick off infested berries. In larger fields, where such measures are impractical, treatments with broad-spectrum insecticides, such as Danitol, Asana, Mustang Max, or Imidan, may be required.

Due to the increasingly negative public perception of these insecticides, a number of "softer" materials have been introduced in recent years, including Assail, Altacor, Avaunt, or Delegate.[4]
