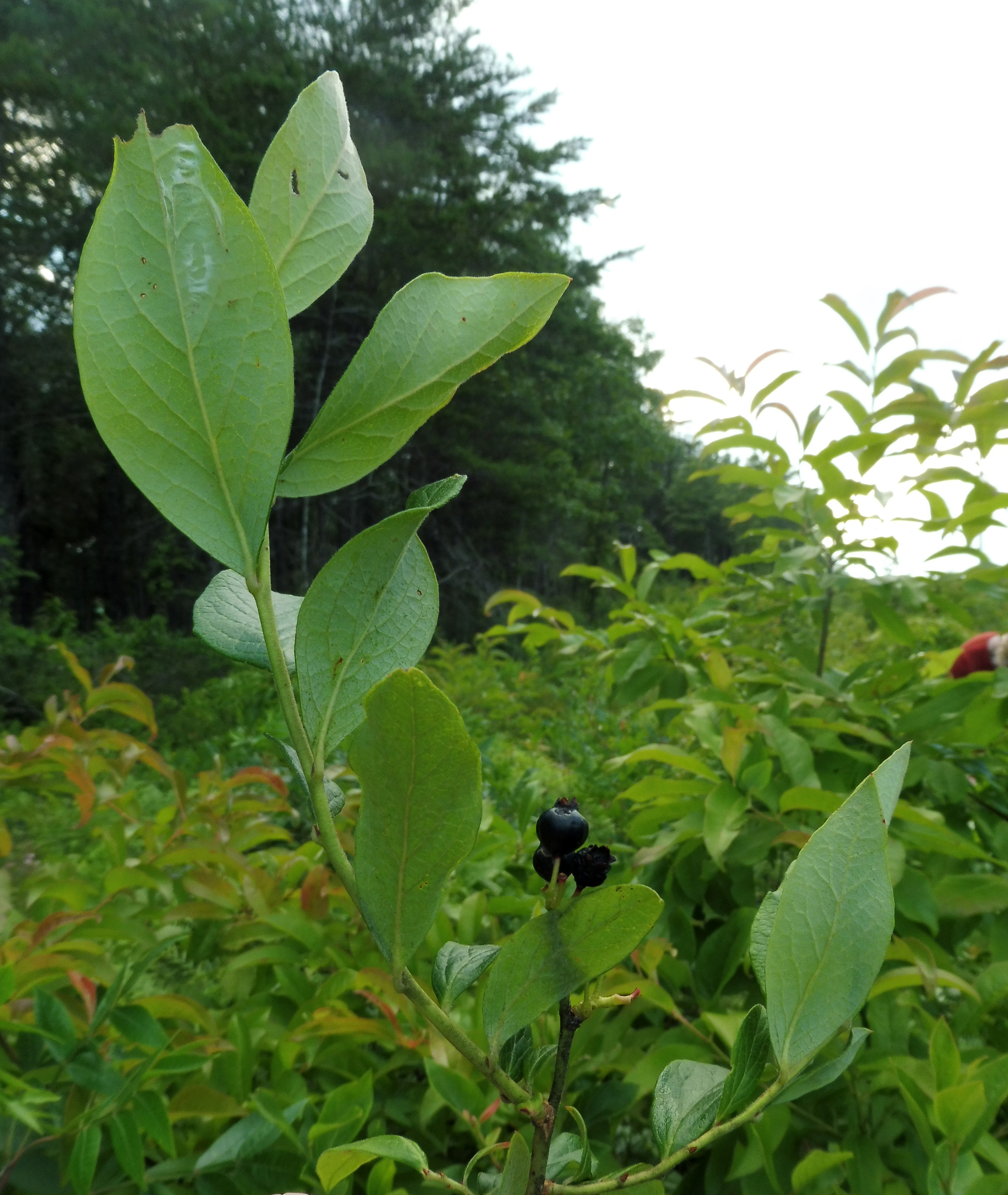

Scientific classification
- Kingdom: Plantae
- Clade: Tracheophytes
- Clade: Angiosperms
- Clade: Eudicots
- Clade: Asterids
- Order: Ericales
- Family: Ericaceae
- Genus: Vaccinium
- Section: Vaccinium sect. Cyanococcus
- Species: V. fuscatum

Binomial name
- Vaccinium fuscatum Aiton

= Vaccinium fuscatum =

Berry and plant

Vaccinium fuscatum, the black highbush blueberry or hairy highbush blueberry, is a species of flowering plant in the heath family (Ericaceae). It is native to North America, where it is found in Ontario, Canada and the eastern United States. Its typical natural habitat is wet areas such as bogs, pocosins, and swamps.

Vaccinium fuscatum is an upright deciduous shrub. It can be distinguished from the similar-looking Vaccinium corymbosum by its stems and abaxial leaf surfaces are pubescent with dingy hairs, and its dark colored fruit that lacks a glaucous coating. In addition it has an earlier bloom time, producing flowers in early spring. It is sometimes considered a synonym of Vaccinium corymbosum. Cytology is 2n = 24, 48.
