= Agenor Mafra-Neto =

American chemical ecology researcher (born 1964)

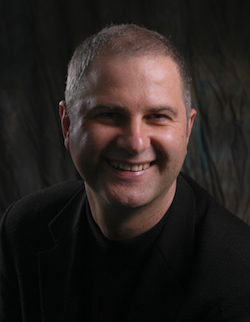
- Mafra-Neto in 2005
- Born: Agenor Mafra-Neto; May 31, 1964 (age 62); Brazil
- Education: University of Massachusetts Amherst; Iowa State University at Ames
- Known for: Mating disruption Integrated pest management
- Spouse: Selin Yildiz
- Scientific career
- Fields: Chemical ecology Entomology
- Workplaces: ISCA Technologies, Inc. University of California Riverside; Western Carolina University; Universidade de Alfenas; Universidade de São Paulo Ribeirao Preto
- Doctoral advisor: Ring T. Carde

Agenor Mafra-Neto (born May 31, 1964) is a chemical ecology researcher and entrepreneur in the entomological field of insect chemical ecology. He is the CEO of ISCA Technologies, a company specializing in the development semiochemical solutions for pest management, robotic smart traps and nanosensors. Dr Mafra-Neto is the CEO and Director of Research and Development at ISCA Technologies, Inc. which he founded in 1996 in Riverside, California. ISCA Tecnologias, Ltda was founded in Brazil in 1997.

== Education ==
Mafra-Neto came to the U.S. from Brazil in 1988 and received his PhD at the University of Massachusetts Amherst, under the guidance of Ring T. Carde. He completed a postdoctoral fellowship with Thomas C. Baker at Iowa State University at Ames, and has worked at the Universidade de Alfenas, Universidade de São Paulo Ribeirao Preto, Western Carolina University, and University of California, Riverside. Mafra-Neto is known for his work in the chemical orientation of insects, both basic and applied research. Dr. Mafra-Neto's expertise is in determining an insect's responsiveness to pheromone-containing lures (pheromone trap) and in disrupting their orientation to a pheromone source (mating disruption). Dr. Mafra-Neto has worked on the modification of insect behavior using semiochemicals both in the lab and in the field.

== Research work ==
On a basic scientific level, his research has included the 1) the behavior of insects in the presence of complete and incomplete blends of pheromone at different doses, 2) the effect of combining pheromones with insecticides, and 3) different forms of pheromone presentation and their effect on flying males.

== Career in chemical ecology/entomology ==
In terms of applied science Mafra-Neto has developed and co-developed several semiochemical tools, devices and strategies for pest management. One such strategy is an inexpensive attract-and-kill system developed for small cotton growers in Brazil. Two examples of more technologically advanced strategies to release semiochemicals are the Metered Semiochemical Timed-Release System (MSTRS) and Specialized Pheromone & Lure Application Technology (SPLAT). The development of the MSTRS or Puffers, resulted in a novel, automated device that holds large quantities of pheromone under pressure, and actively releases exact doses of active ingredients at set intervals throughout a programmed period, proven to control pests in very diverse environments including storage facilities, grasslands and corn fields (Baker et al. 1997 J. Agric.[7]), and cranberry bogs SPLAT is a proprietary base matrix formulation of biologically inert materials used to control the release of semiochemicals and/or odors with or without pesticides. Extensive research on SPLAT using a variety of lures demonstrates that this matrix emits semiochemicals at effective pest suppression levels for a time interval ranging from 2–30 weeks, controlling larvae and adult insect pests.

== Managing mosquitoes and the diseases they vector: Trojan Cows ==
Mafra-Neto has developed an artificial scent, called Abate, that has the key semiochemical elements to provide a signature of human host smell to mosquitoes and other blood feeding insects. Spraying abate on an animal can trick anthropophilic disease-transmitting insects, such as malaria mosquitoes, into attacking animals rather than their preferred human hosts, thereby reducing infection rates. Malaria-causing parasites, carried by mosquitoes, identify the human hosts that help them reproduce by detecting the semiochemicals that now are contained in the Abate formulation. Cattle are resistant to malaria and many other human diseases transmitted by insects, and are often treated with deworming medication, which has a toxic effect on mosquitoes and their parasites. Abate opens up the possibility for novel ways to reduce the impact of insect vectored diseases, such as malaria. This is being tested with generous funds from the Bill and Melinda Gates Foundation. The use of Abate in tandem with area-wide deworming campaigns has the potential to disrupt the transmission cycle of insect vectored human diseases, like malaria, in the treated areas.

== Managing mosquitoes and the diseases they vector: Nectar Based Attract and Kill ==
Mosquitoes, independent of their physiological state or gender, feed on sugar solutions virtually every day of their lives. Mafra-Neto's group has developed an artificial blend, called Vectrax, that attracts disease-carrying male and female disease-carrying mosquitoes by mimicking the scent of flowers and the sweet taste of nectar. These components also induce mosquitoes to feed on the formulation, which, when applied in the field blended with a small amount of an effective insecticide results in an attract and kill (A&K) formulation. Vectrax has shown to effectively target mosquito vector species, like Aedes, Anopheles, and Culex species, while leaving non-target organisms unharmed. When sprayed on vegetation or structures outside residential areas and public spaces, Vectrax attracts and kills outdoor mosquitoes before they can bite a host, acting as an effective barrier to mosquitoes that might otherwise enter households in search of blood meals. As an inexpensive, efficacious, and easy-to-apply mosquito control formulation specifically designed for outdoor use, this product is addressing a critical weakness in current efforts to eradicate malaria[5][4], Zika, Dengue, Filariasis and other vector-transmitted diseases, improving the health and quality of life of people living in endemic regions around the globe.

== Smart traps and sensors ==
Dr. Mafra-Neto has developed IP that resulted in several patents, including on autonomous, area-wide monitoring and reporting systems, on smart traps and pest identification sensors His research on sensors, including nanosensors and sensor signals resulted in competitive awards from several agencies, including the National Science Foundation (NSF), Department of Defense (DoD), US Army, Air Force, NIST Advanced Technologies Program (ATP) from the Department of Commerce, United States Department of Agriculture (USDA) and the National Institute of Health (NIH) among others. Together with Dr. Eamonn Keogh, he received the first prize in the 2012 Vodafone Americas Foundation's Wireless Innovation Project and a Bill and Melinda Gates Foundation Grand Challenges Explorations Grant.
