= Oberea myops =

Scientific classification
- Domain: Eukaryota
- Kingdom: Animalia
- Phylum: Arthropoda
- Class: Insecta
- Order: Coleoptera
- Suborder: Polyphaga
- Infraorder: Cucujiformia
- Family: Cerambycidae
- Genus: Oberea
- Species: O. myops

Binomial name
- Oberea myops Haldeman, 1847

Species of beetle

Oberea myops is a species of beetle in the family Cerambycidae. It was described by Haldeman in 1847. It is known from Canada.
