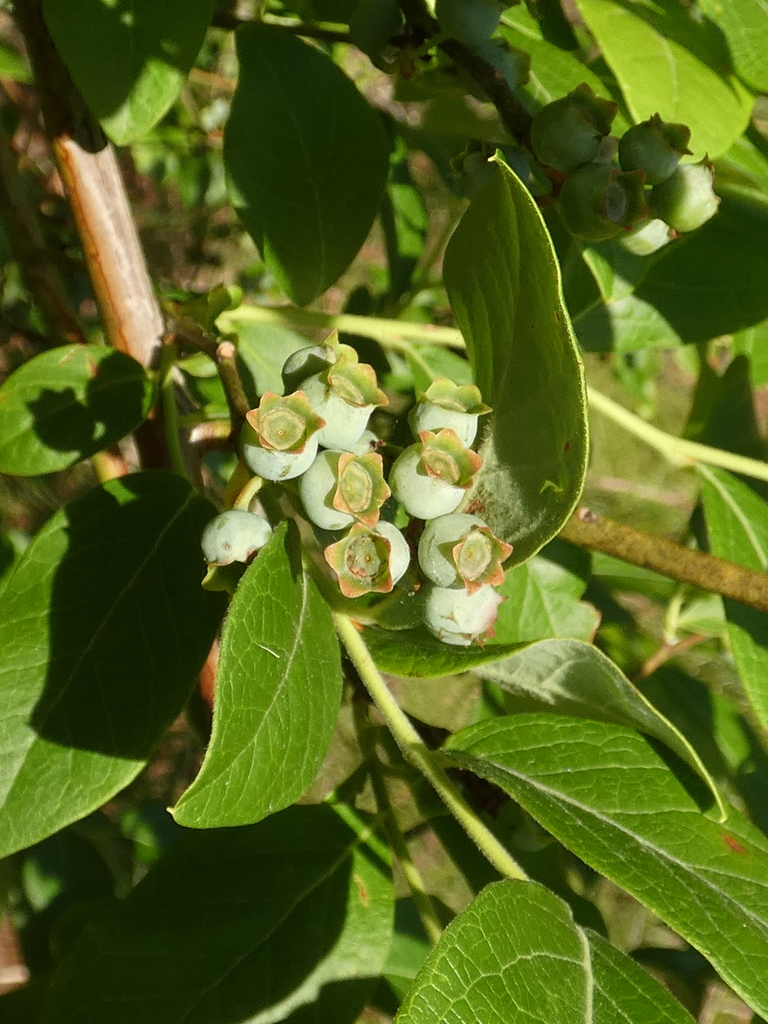

Scientific classification
- Kingdom: Plantae
- Clade: Tracheophytes
- Clade: Angiosperms
- Clade: Eudicots
- Clade: Asterids
- Order: Ericales
- Family: Ericaceae
- Genus: Vaccinium
- Section: Vaccinium sect. Cyanococcus
- Species: V. formosum

Binomial name
- Vaccinium formosum Andrews

= Vaccinium formosum =

Species of plant

Vaccinium formosum, with common names highbush blueberry, southern blueberry, southern highbush blueberry, and swamp highbush blueberry, is a species of blueberry native to the Southeastern United States.

== Description ==
Vaccinium formosum is a deciduous shrub that grows to approximately 4–4.5 metres (13–15 ft) tall. The plant has green stems that turn into woody growth as the stems age. The leaves are ovaloid, green, and about 2.5–7.5 centimetres (1–3 in) long.

The flowers are whitish-pink and bell-shaped. The fruit is a dark blue berry with a glaucous bloom on one end.

== Distribution and habitat ==
Vaccinium formosum is native to the Southeastern United States. It has been found in Alabama, Florida, Georgia, South Carolina, North Carolina, Virginia, Washington, D.C., Maryland, Delaware, and New York. It grows in a variety of habitats including bogs, pine barrens, mires, ravines and mountain summits.

== Cultivation ==
The plant's primary habitats are in marshes, wetlands, and loamy/sandy soils. It prefers low pH, acidic soils and will not fruit or grow well in basic conditions. The ideal conditions for this plant are in full sun; it can handle partial-sun though it may fruit less. The harvest season of the edible fruit of the Vaccinium formosum is primarily late spring/summer.

== Uses ==
The berries are edible in both raw and cooked forms.
