= Bulka =

Bulka is a surname. Notable people with the surname include:

- Marcin Bułka (born 1999), Polish professional footballer
- Reuven Bulka (1944–2021), Canadian rabbi, writer, broadcaster, and activist
