= Cyclocephala longula =

Scientific classification
- Kingdom: Animalia
- Phylum: Arthropoda
- Clade: Pancrustacea
- Class: Insecta
- Order: Coleoptera
- Suborder: Polyphaga
- Infraorder: Scarabaeiformia
- Family: Scarabaeidae
- Genus: Cyclocephala
- Species: C. longula

Binomial name
- Cyclocephala longula Leconte, 1863

Synonyms
- Ochrosidia abrupta Casey, 1915; Ochrosidia ambiens Casey, 1915; Ochrosidia californica Arrow, 1937; Ochrosidia marcida Casey, 1915; Ochrosidia modulata Casey, 1915; Ochrosidia obesula Casey, 1915; Ochrosidia oblongula Casey, 1915; Ochrosidia phasma Casey, 1915; Ochrosidia prona Casey, 1915; Ochrosidia reflexa Casey, 1915; Ochrosidia rugulifrons Casey, 1915; Ochrosidia rustica Casey, 1915

Species of beetle

Cyclocephala longula is a species of rhinoceros beetle in the family Scarabaeidae. It is found in North America, where it has been recorded from Canada (British Columbia), the United States (Arizona, California, Colorado, Idaho, Illinois, Kansas, Montana, Nebraska, Nevada, New Mexico, Oklahoma, Oregon, South Dakota, Texas, Utah, Washington, Wyoming), and Mexico (Baja California, Baja California Sur, Chihuahua, Sonora).
