= Vaccinium simulatum =

Conservation status
- Secure (NatureServe)

Scientific classification
- Kingdom: Plantae
- Clade: Tracheophytes
- Clade: Angiosperms
- Clade: Eudicots
- Clade: Asterids
- Order: Ericales
- Family: Ericaceae
- Genus: Vaccinium
- Species: V. simulatum

Binomial name
- Vaccinium simulatum Small

Species of plant

Vaccinium simulatum, also called upland highbush blueberry, is a species of plant in the Ericaceae (Heath) family. It was first described by John Kunkel Small (January 31, 1869 – January 20, 1938), an American taxonomist and botanical explorer. Some authorities consider it a synonym of Vaccinium corymbosum.
