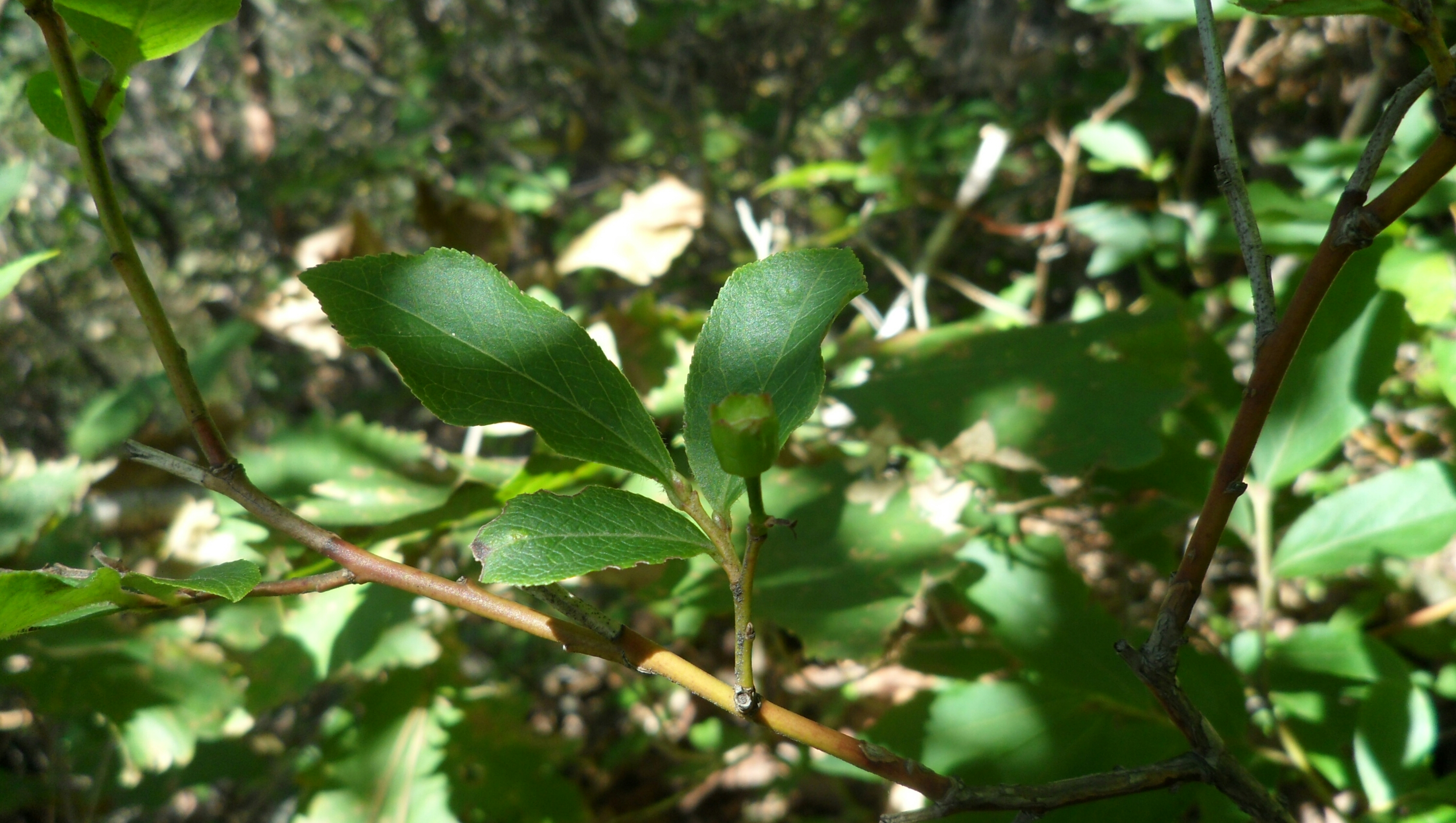

Scientific classification
- Kingdom: Plantae
- Clade: Tracheophytes
- Clade: Angiosperms
- Clade: Eudicots
- Clade: Asterids
- Order: Ericales
- Family: Ericaceae
- Genus: Vaccinium
- Species: V. koreanum

Binomial name
- Vaccinium koreanum Nakai

= Vaccinium koreanum =

Korean blueberry

Berry and plant

Vaccinium koreanum, the Korean blueberry, Korean: 산앵도나무, romanized: sanaedonamu, Chinese: 红果越桔; pinyin: hóngguǒyuèjié, is a plant species native to Korea and neighboring Liaoning Province in China. It is a deciduous shrub with toothed leaves and red, ellipsoid berries.

== Habitat ==
It grows on rocky, mountain summits.
