= Harpalus erraticus =

Scientific classification
- Kingdom: Animalia
- Phylum: Arthropoda
- Class: Insecta
- Order: Coleoptera
- Suborder: Adephaga
- Family: Carabidae
- Genus: Harpalus
- Species: H. erraticus

Binomial name
- Harpalus erraticus Say, 1823

Species of beetle

Harpalus erraticus is a species in the beetle family Carabidae. It is found in the United States and Canada.
