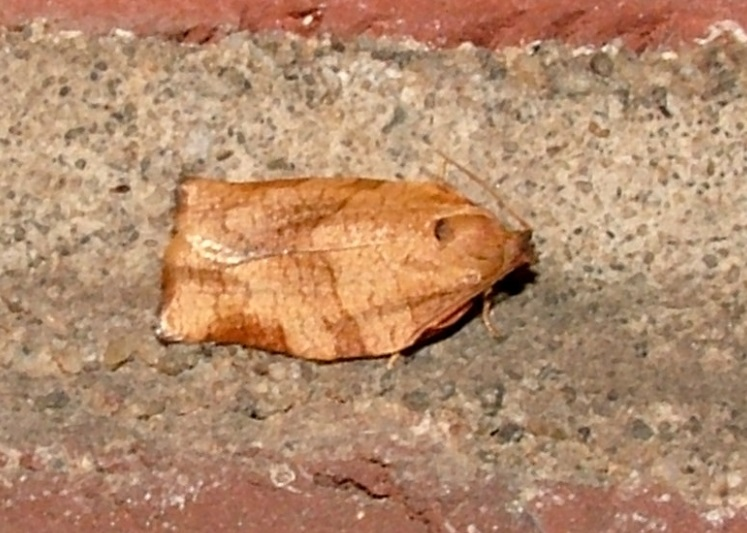

Scientific classification
- Domain: Eukaryota
- Kingdom: Animalia
- Phylum: Arthropoda
- Class: Insecta
- Order: Lepidoptera
- Family: Tortricidae
- Genus: Choristoneura
- Species: C. rosaceana

Binomial name
- Choristoneura rosaceana (Harris, 1841)

Synonyms
- Loxotaenia rosaceana Harris, 1841; Archips rosaceana; Cacoecia rosaceana; Tortrix rosaceana; Lozotaenia gossypina Packard, 1869; Teras vicariana Walker, 1863

= Choristoneura rosaceana =

Species of moth

Choristoneura rosaceana, the oblique banded leaf roller or rosaceous leaf roller, is a moth of the family Tortricidae. It is native to North America, but has been accidentally introduced into other parts of the world.

The wingspan is about 25 mm. The forewing length is 7.5–11 mm for males and 11.5–14 mm for females. Adults are on wing from June to July and again from August to September in most of its range.

== Description ==
The caterpillar is green with a black head. The adult is a small, light brown moth.

== Symptoms and signs ==
The presence of the species is suggested by rolled, tied and chewed leaves and minor feeding damage on fruits. Damage can be extensive on rosaceous plants.

== Host plants ==
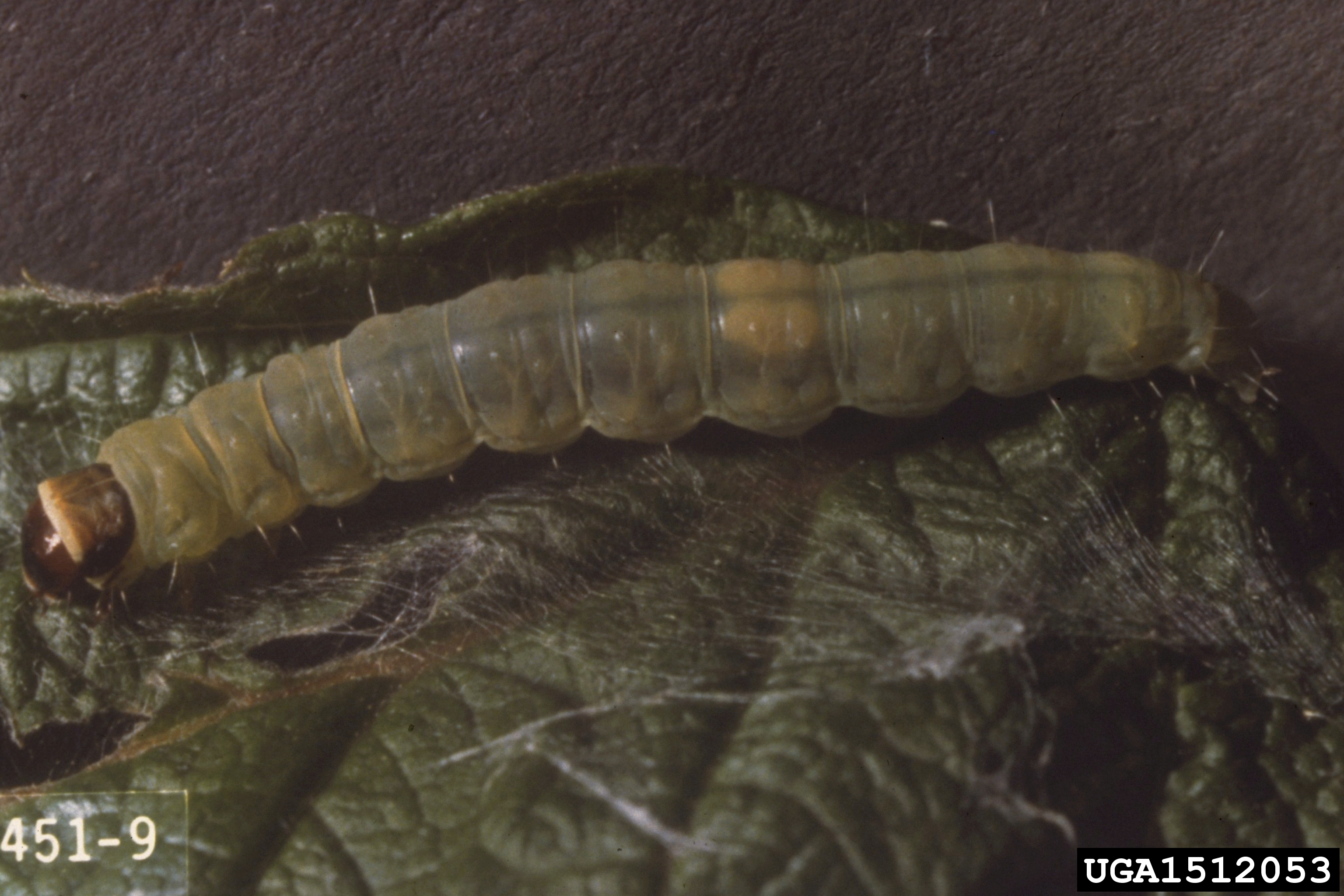
Caterpillar

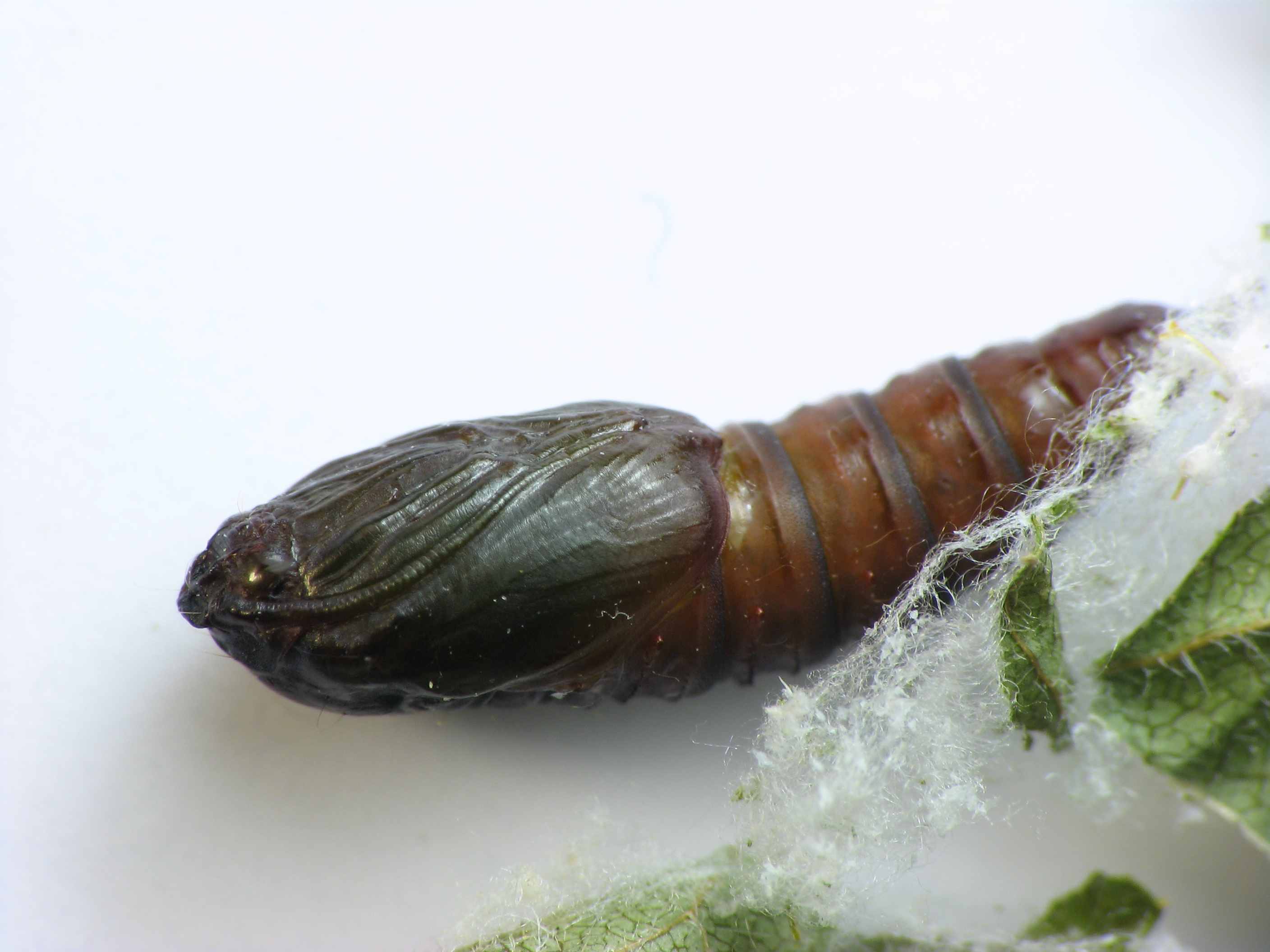
Pupa

Recorded host plants are:

- Acer
- Aesculus
- Betula
- Cirsium
- Crataegus
- Corylus
- Cornus
- Cotoneaster
- Dianthus (carnation)
- Fragaria (strawberry)
- Fraxinus
- Lonicera
- Malus
- Picea
- Pinus
- Platanus
- Populus
- Prunus
- Pyracantha
- Quercus
- Rhododendron (rhododendron, azalea)
- Rosa
- Rubus
- Salix
- Sorbus
- Spirea
- Syringa (lilac)
- Tilia
- Tsuga
- Vaccinium
- Verbena
- Viburnum
