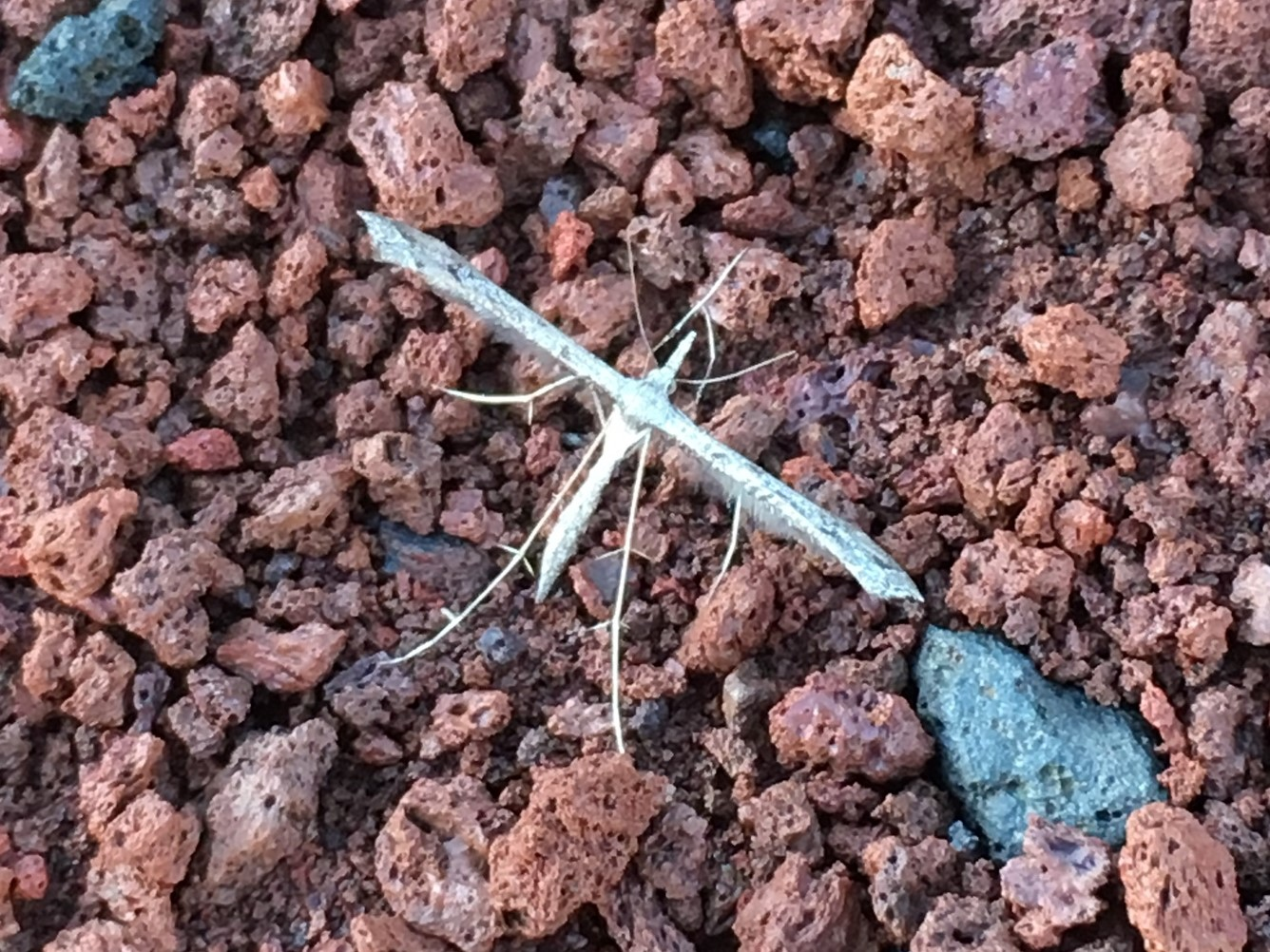

Scientific classification
- Kingdom: Animalia
- Phylum: Arthropoda
- Class: Insecta
- Order: Lepidoptera
- Family: Pterophoridae
- Genus: Stenoptilodes
- Species: S. littoralis

Binomial name
- Stenoptilodes littoralis (Butler, 1882)

Synonyms
- Platyptilus littoralis Butler, 1882; Platyptilia littoralis; Platyptilia rhynchophora Meyrick, 1888; Platyptilia inceptrix Meyrick, 1913; Platyptilia insularis Walsingham, 1907

= Stenoptilodes littoralis =

Species of plume moth

Stenoptilodes littoralis is a moth of the family Pterophoridae that is only known from the Hawaiian islands of Kauai, Oahu, Molokai and Hawaii. Though it is only known from the Hawaiian Islands, it may be an introduced species.

It is a highly variable species.

The larvae of subspecies S. l. littoralis have been recorded on Geranium cariolinianum australe, while subspecies S. l. rhynchophora feeds on Vaccinium species, including Vaccinium penduliflorurn, Vaccinium reticulatum and Vaccinium calycinum.

== Subspecies ==
- Stenoptilodes littoralis littoralis (Kauai, Oahu, Molokai, Hawaii)
- Stenoptilodes littoralis rhynchophora (Meyrick, 1888) (Kauai, Oahu, Molokai, Maui, Hawaii)
