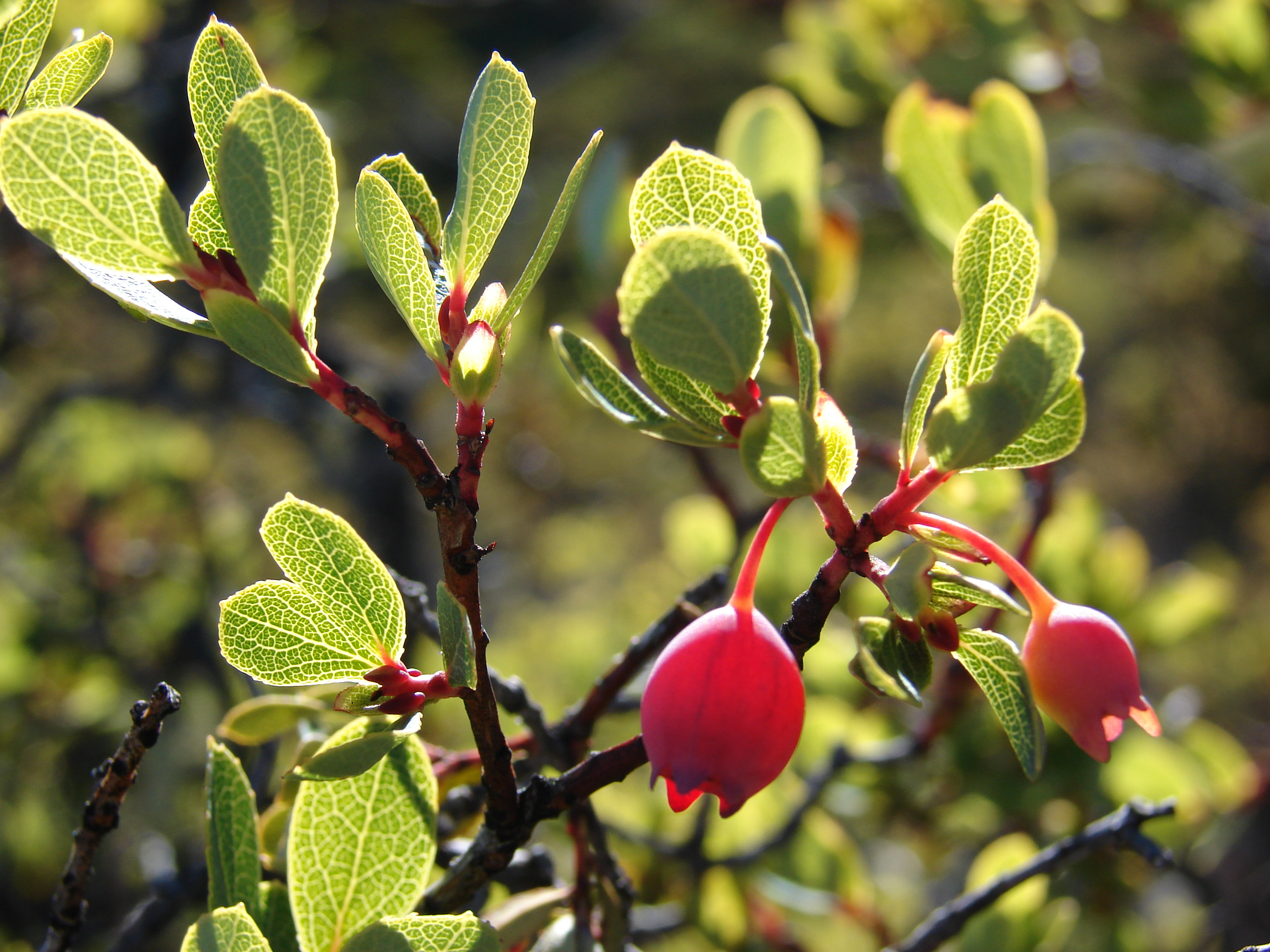
- Vaccinium reticulatum

Scientific classification
- Kingdom: Plantae
- Clade: Embryophytes
- Clade: Tracheophytes
- Clade: Spermatophytes
- Clade: Angiosperms
- Clade: Eudicots
- Clade: Asterids
- Order: Ericales
- Family: Ericaceae
- Genus: Vaccinium
- Clade: Hawaiian Vaccinium

= Hawaiian Vaccinium =

Clade of flowering plants

Hawaiian Vaccinium (blueberries) is a monophyletic group (a clade including all extant species and their common ancestor) comprising three species endemic to the archipelago of Hawaii: Vaccinium reticulatum, V. dentatum and V. calycinum, all commonly known in Hawaii as ʻōhelo.

While Vaccinium as a larger group is characterized by an inferior ovary and brightly-colored berries that are indehiscent, the Hawaiian group has traditionally been distinguished as having uniquely well-developed calyx lobes and longer calyx tube depth, more cylindrical corolla shape (as compared to urceolate-globose), reduced or absent staminal awns (as opposed to well-developed), longer pedicel length, and—compared with temperate relatives —much longer leaf persistence. They are terrestrial or epiphytic shrubs, typically 0.3–1.8 metres (1–6 ft) in height, occasionally up to 3 m (10 ft), ranging widely throughout the Hawaiian islands over relatively high elevation, 500–3,700 m (1,600–12,100 ft). The three species thrive in many plant communities, except for V. reticulatum, which tends to thrive around lava flows, yet is not limited to them.

Within the group, distinct taxa vary in berry color (red, yellow, black, blue), bloom color (white, red, pink and green), foliage shape and size, and pedicel length. Vaccinium reticulatum and Vaccinium dentatum are evergreen, while V. calycinum is deciduous. All three species tend to fruit and flower throughout the year, but maximum flower and fruit production generally occurs during May–July. Outcrossing between all three species has been successful, and many hybrids have been described. All three species are also capable of selfing, but resulting seed viability differs throughout the species complex.

== Taxonomy ==
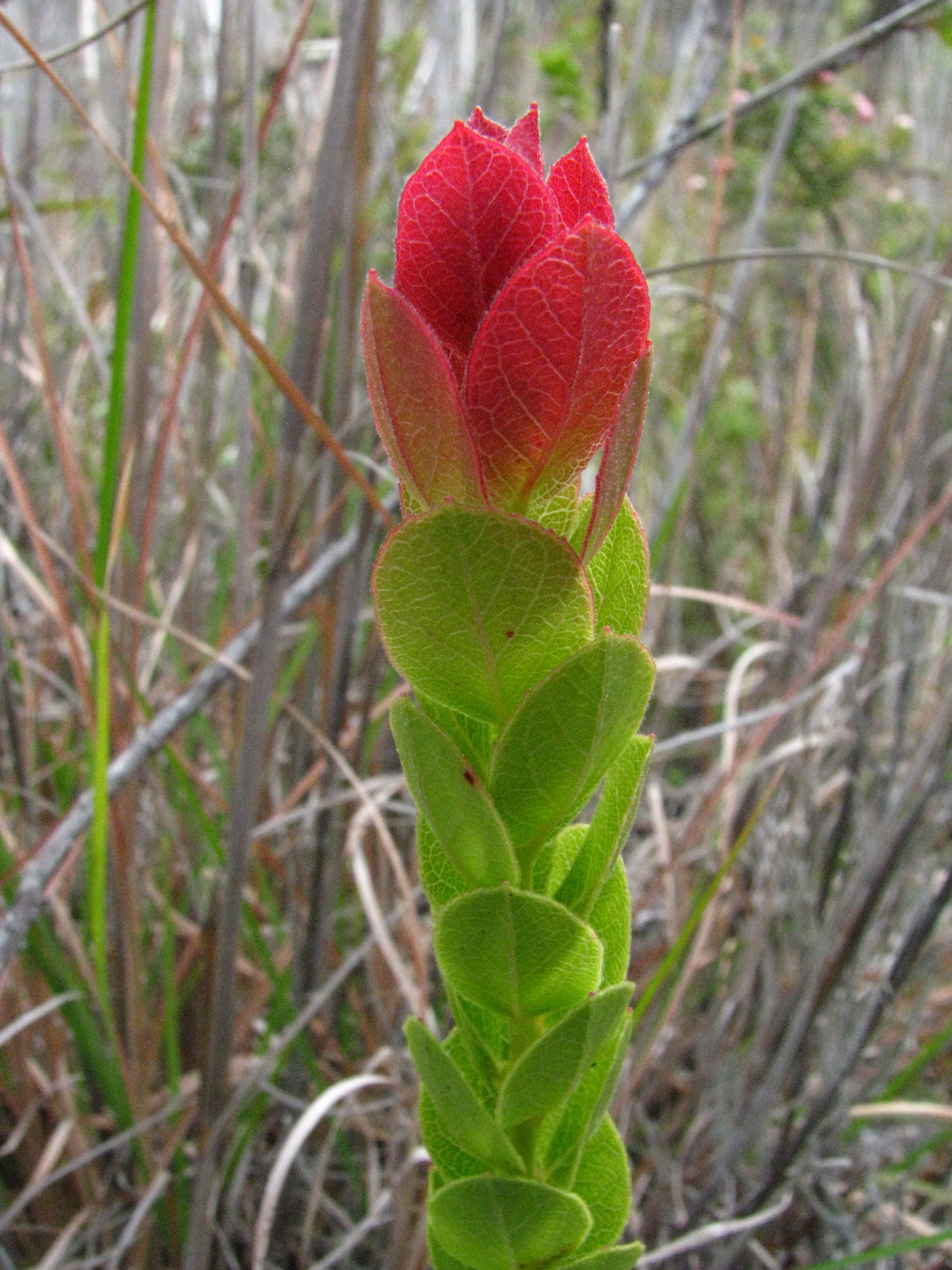
Vibrant foliage of Hawaiian Vaccinium, pigments vary widely throughout the group

This group is thought to be derived from within section Myrtillus of Vaccinium proper, and is thought to have a North American origin of dispersal. However, confidence in the existing molecular evidence for this hypothesis is low, and therefore the status of the sister group to the Hawaiian clade is still unknown. Hawaii is known as a historical hotspot for adaptive radiation because of immense biological opportunity over small, isolated areas, especially advantageous for plants that colonized the islands when they were first formed by volcanic activity. Endemic Hawaiian plant lineages that have undergone adaptive radiation exhibit patterns associated with a loss of dispersal capacity: small populations, isolated usually to one island, if not one small area of one island, exhibiting "explosive" diversity in a small space, reflecting probable "rapid speciation" or an accelerated rate of evolution. However, there is much debate and controversy surrounding the definition and characterization of adaptive radiation.

All three species of Hawaiian Vaccinium show the opposite pattern of adaptive radiation: they are widespread throughout the Hawaiian islands, and have retained their dispersal capacity, thus suggesting, among other hypotheses, a relatively recent dispersal to the archipelago. However, the extent of Hawaiian Vaccinium’s diversification at population levels is not well known. Another characteristic typical of lineages that have undergone adaptive radiation is the ability to self-fertilize. Selfing is said to be rare elsewhere in Vaccinium, but is well established in|Hawaiian Vaccinium. Seed viability among self-fertilized individuals varies, however, between the three species. Controlled experiments found that while selfing is very successful in Vaccinium calycinum, V. reticulatum and V. dentatum show much poorer (62%) seed viability on average, probably due to morphological conditions in the calyx. Researchers have hypothesized that the self-compatible gene is not yet fixed in entire populations of Vaccinium calycinum and Vaccinium reticulatum.

The evolutionary history of the larger group Vaccinium has long been complete mystery for plant systematists and evolutionary biologists: species that have been found to be genetically related to not fall into groups traditionally described by morphological similarity, nor do they follow geographic pattern. What is certain is that the plant species traditionally understood to form the genus Vaccinium do not form a monophyly. Given this information, it is difficult to speculate with confidence upon the evolutionary history of Hawaiian Vaccinium, though there is some confidence that there is a single common ancestor of the group.

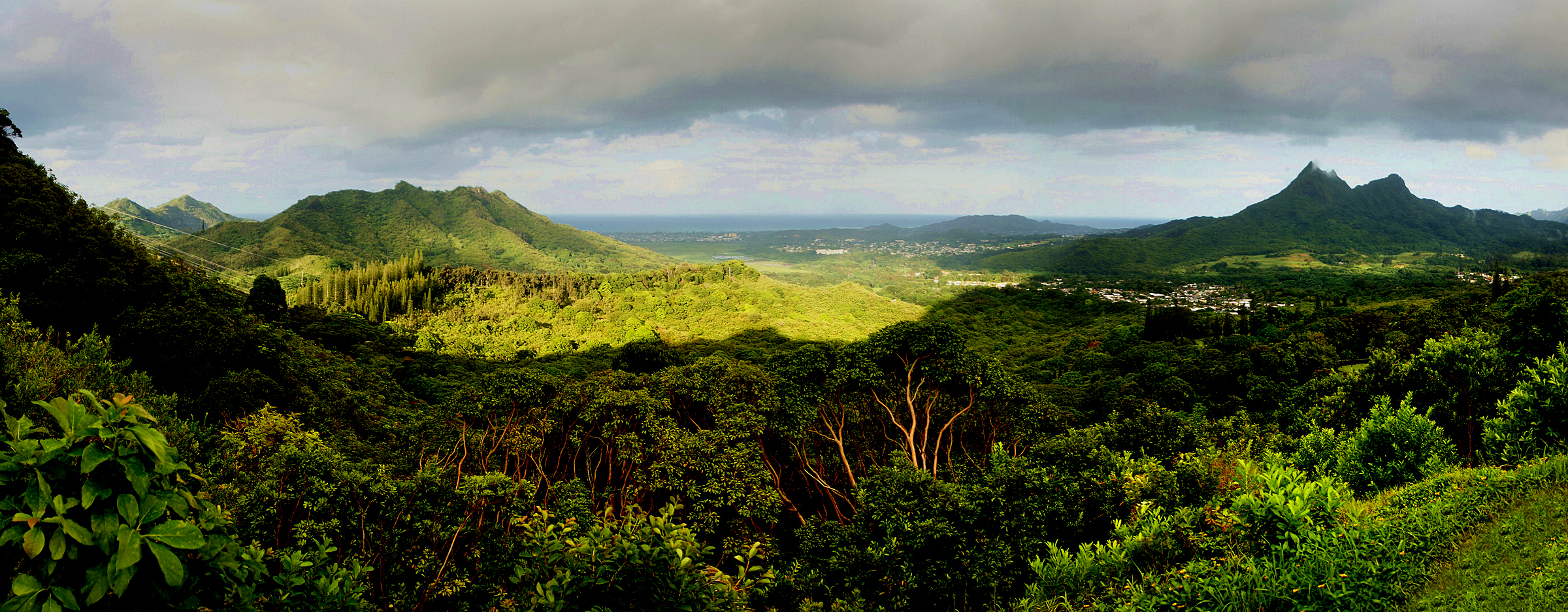
Overlook from Oahu

=== Section Macropelma ===
Hawaiian Vaccinium was originally placed in a section named Macropelma, which traditionally included the three Hawaiian species and a mysterious South Pacific Island species known as Vaccinium cereum. Vaccinium cereum was originally described by Sleumer as the type specimen for section Macropelma. There is much ongoing debate as to the taxonomic placement of these four species as more information about their genetic relationships becomes available. The key distinctive morphological feature separating Vaccinium cereum from the Hawaiian taxa is the pseudo-10-locular ovary, which is similar to ovary structure common of Asian Vaccinium species, as opposed to the strictly 5-locular present in most New World species and the Hawaiian taxa. It was long believed that this pseudo-10-locular ovary was the plesiomorphic condition of the ancestor of Hawaiian Vaccinium, and the three Hawaiian taxa proliferated from V. cereum. However, as noted above, the Hawaiian taxa are hypothesized with moderate confidence to belong in the Myrtillus section, which is primarily North American.

Combined evidence including molecular work done by Kron and Powell, together with Sam Vander Kloet’s detailed examination of morphological variation throughout the four species has concluded that V. cereum is probably a hybrid species, with origins shared between V. calycinum, a member of the Hawaiian taxa and V. fragile, a taxon of East Asian origin in section Eococcus. If Hawaiian Vaccinium is confirmed to be derived from section Myrtillus, this may mean that V. cereum represents an entity of union between new world and old world Vaccinium. However, these are simply exciting postulations for now, as there is much uncertainty surrounding the evolutionary history South Pacific Vaccinium in general. For instance, though there is confidence that Hawaiian taxa are close in relation to primarily North American section Myrtillus, some taxonomic treatments based on molecular data of Myrtillus have included Japanese species Vaccinium yatabei. These findings support that a Japanese species is just as likely to be closest in genetic relation to the Hawaiian taxa than the North American members. Such a situation would place Japan as the likely origin of dispersal.

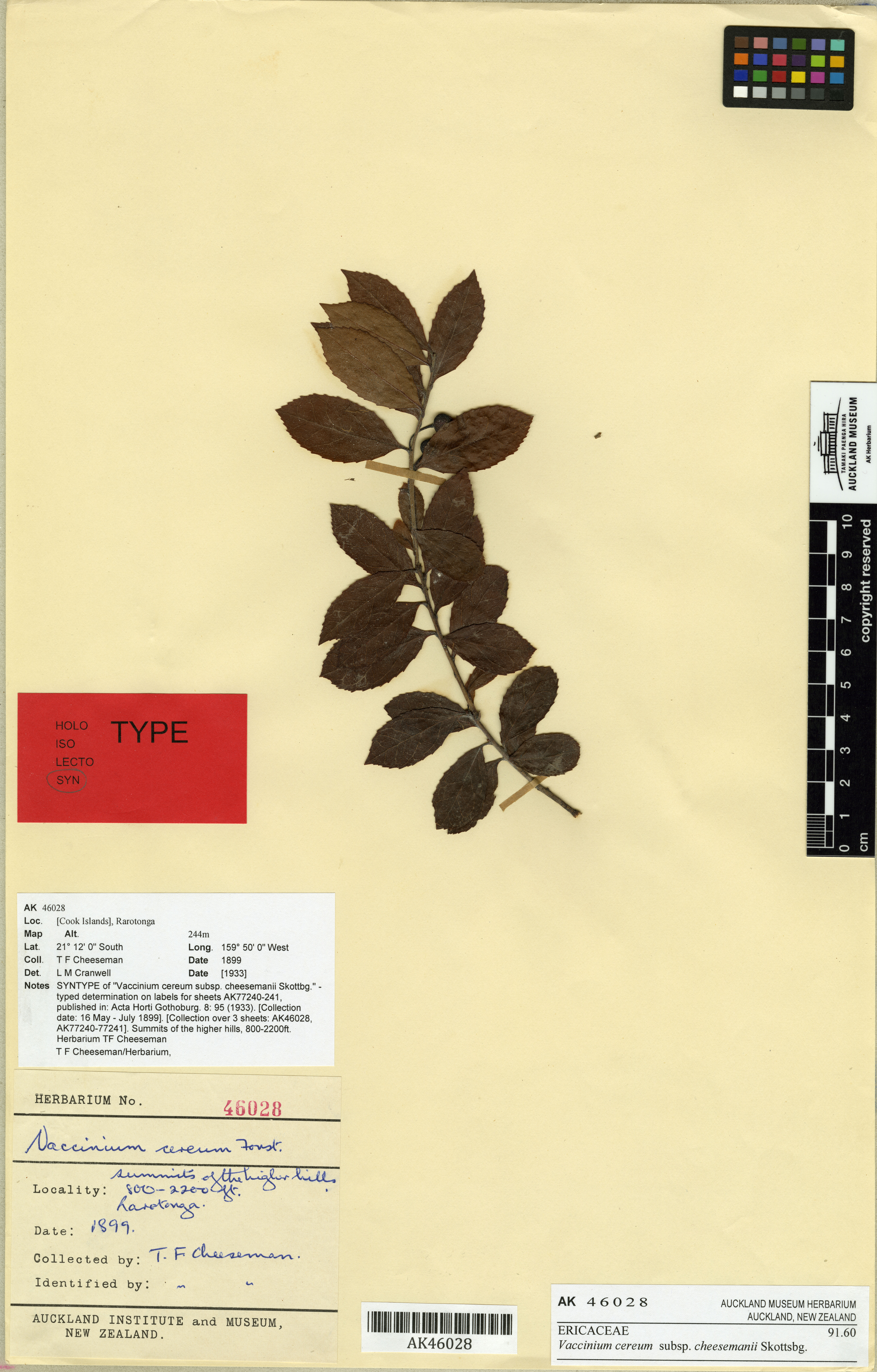
Little is known about the mysterious V. cereum

==== Vaccinium cereum: a South Pacific hybrid ====
It should be noted first that V. cereum is not Hawaiian. It ranges throughout islands in the South Pacific including the Cook Islands, the Marquesas Islands, and Tahiti in the Society Islands, at high elevations of 255–436 m (838–1,430 ft). Vander Kloet noted that Vaccinium cereum uniquely has a pseudo-10-locular ovary and a complex floriferous shoot, both characters associated with East Asian species of Vaccinium and not Hawaiian Vaccinium, which are strictly 5-locular in ovary structure. Vaccinium cereum is said to be, on average, more similar to Hawaiian taxa in other reproductive and vegetative characters than Eastern Asian species, but persistently retains the pseudo-10-locular ovary, characteristic of Eastern Asian species. Morphological variation throughout Vaccinium cereum’s range is enormous: pubescence, glaucescence, fruit and flower color all vary widely from island to island, sometimes from population to population on the same island, and, miraculously, from individual to individual within populations. Some become more uniform on larger islands where populations seem to be more stable, but the norm seems to be outlandish. Vander Kloet, a researcher very experienced with Vaccinium, once found a single individual that exhibited all types of inflorescences he had ever seen on any Vaccinium throughout the world, all on a single plant.

== Species ==
=== Vaccinium reticulatum ===
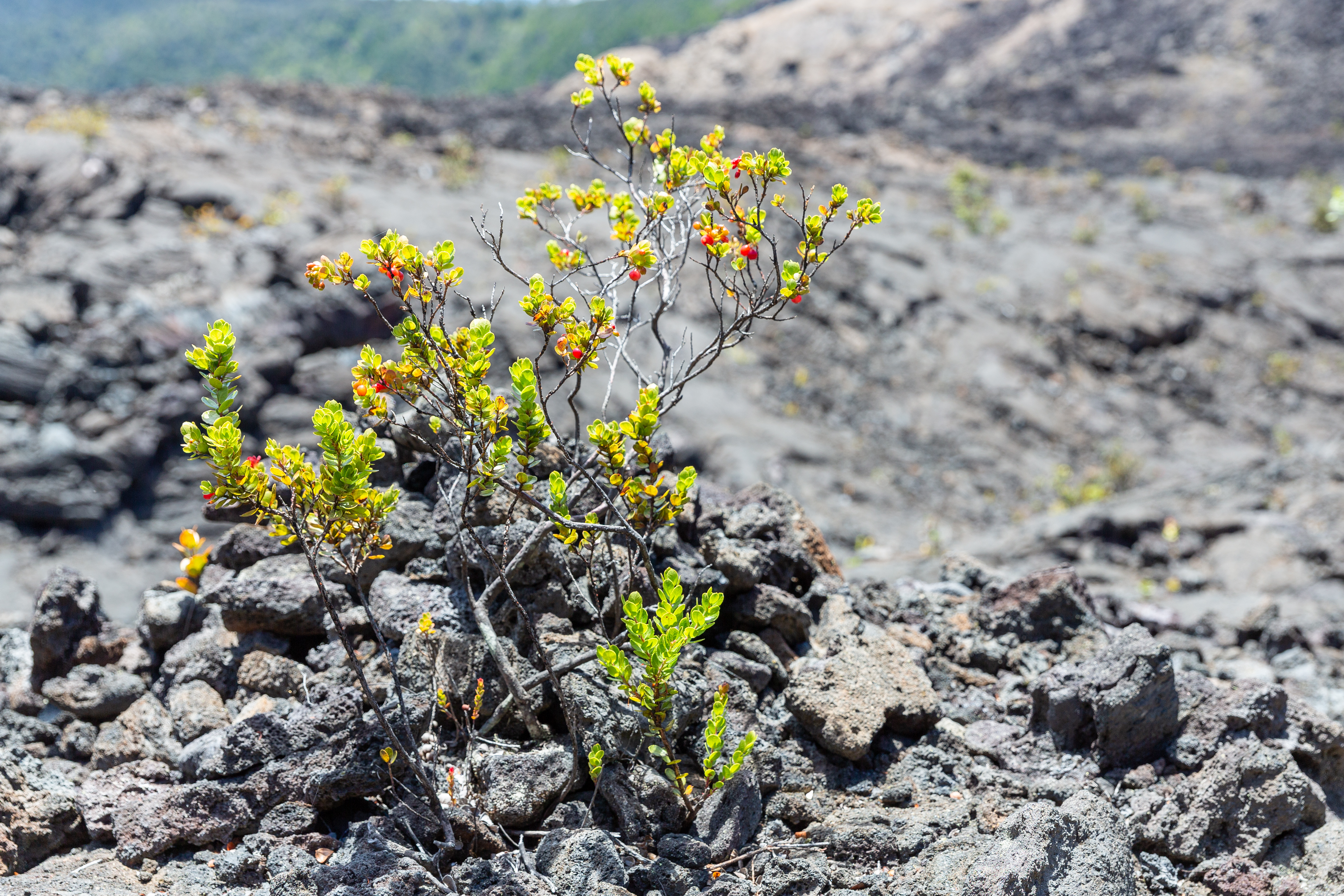
Vaccinium reticulatum thriving on lava flow

Vaccinium reticulatum is a rhizomatous, evergreen shrub, characterized by stiffly erect aerial shoots, often pubescent throughout. Leaves ovate at 1–3 cm long and wide and typically exhibit pubescent and/or serrate margins, but not always. Berries (9-14 mm in diameter) range in color from bright red, yellow, orange, purple or blue, while flower color ranges from red, yellow, yellow with red stripes, greenish yellow and varying in shape from urceolate to cylindrical. Flowers are typically 8–12 mm long. There is much variation in these characters, but they are not ubiquitous: specific morphotypes characterized by leaf anatomy are said to be restricted to specific islands, but this distribution has not yet been formally delimited.

Vaccinium reticulatum differs from Vaccinium dentatum and Vaccinium calycinum in several ways.

In general, all vegetative and reproductive anatomy tends to be smaller and more compact than the other two species. Foliage tends to be chartaceous (papery) in V. reticulatum, while is coriaceous (leathery) in Vaccinium dentatum and Vaccinium calycinum.

Vaccinium reticulatum is much less common in diverse plant communities, and is often described as an early successional plant, thriving primarily on exposed sites: lava flows, ash dunes, cinder beds, which may be a reflection of its morphological differences. Its range is more commonly alpine, with specimens found at 3,700 m (12,100 ft). Vaccinium reticulatum is primarily found on Maui, Hawaii, less on the older islands of Kauai, Oahu and Molokai, as compared to the other two species found more commonly across all of these islands. In V. reticulatum, transition from juvenile to mature foliage is much more gradual than the other two species. Flowering occurs 5 years after germination (a much longer time period than the other two species) and occurs throughout the year but primarily twice per year.

Physically, the primary character of distinguishability of this species, denoted in Vander Kloet’s keys, is stout pedicels: 0.5–1.5 cm long. All other characters described in this section vary too much to be treated as strictly distinguishing characters, yet are often treated as such in a collective manner for identification purposes. Vaccinium reticulatum is very morphologically diverse, and has been suggested as a “hybrid swarm of dubious parentage", and while hybrids have been described as separate species, the current consensus seems to agree that Vaccinium reticulatum is a single entity.

=== Vaccinium dentatum ===
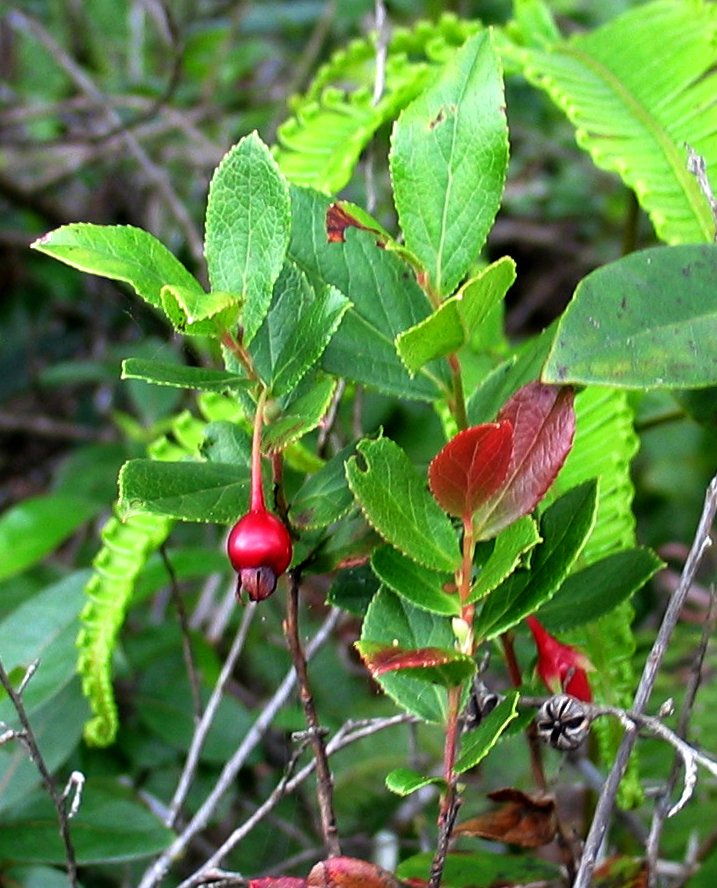
Vaccinium dentatum

Vaccinium dentatum is typically found decumbent to sprawling, 0.3 to 3 m tall, mostly on terrestrial edges and open areas: bogs, swamps, or windy exposed ridges. Vaccinium dentatum tends to occur at lower elevations than V. reticulatum: 700–1,200 m (2,300–3,900 ft) and with a wider range across all main Hawaiian islands. Leaf anatomy is more or less uniquely elliptic (4–9 cm long by 1–3 cm wide), with serrate margins and usually glabrous. Flower variation is less than that in V. reticulatum: carolla red or pink with greenish lobes, 9–12 mm long. Berry variation is also more consistent in this species: usually bright red, 8-10mm in diameter. Flowering and fruiting occur throughout the year. Vaccinium dentatum requires 2–3 years after germination to bloom.

The distinguishing character denoted in Vander Kloet’s keys is again pedicel length: 1–3 cm long. Vaccinium dentatum can generally be identified by its characteristic red berries and typical leaf anatomy, as well as its habitat, but because these same morphologies and behaviors can be found in V. reticulatum, care must be taken in distinguishing between the species, hence the emphasis of the pedicel length character.

=== Vaccinium calycinum ===
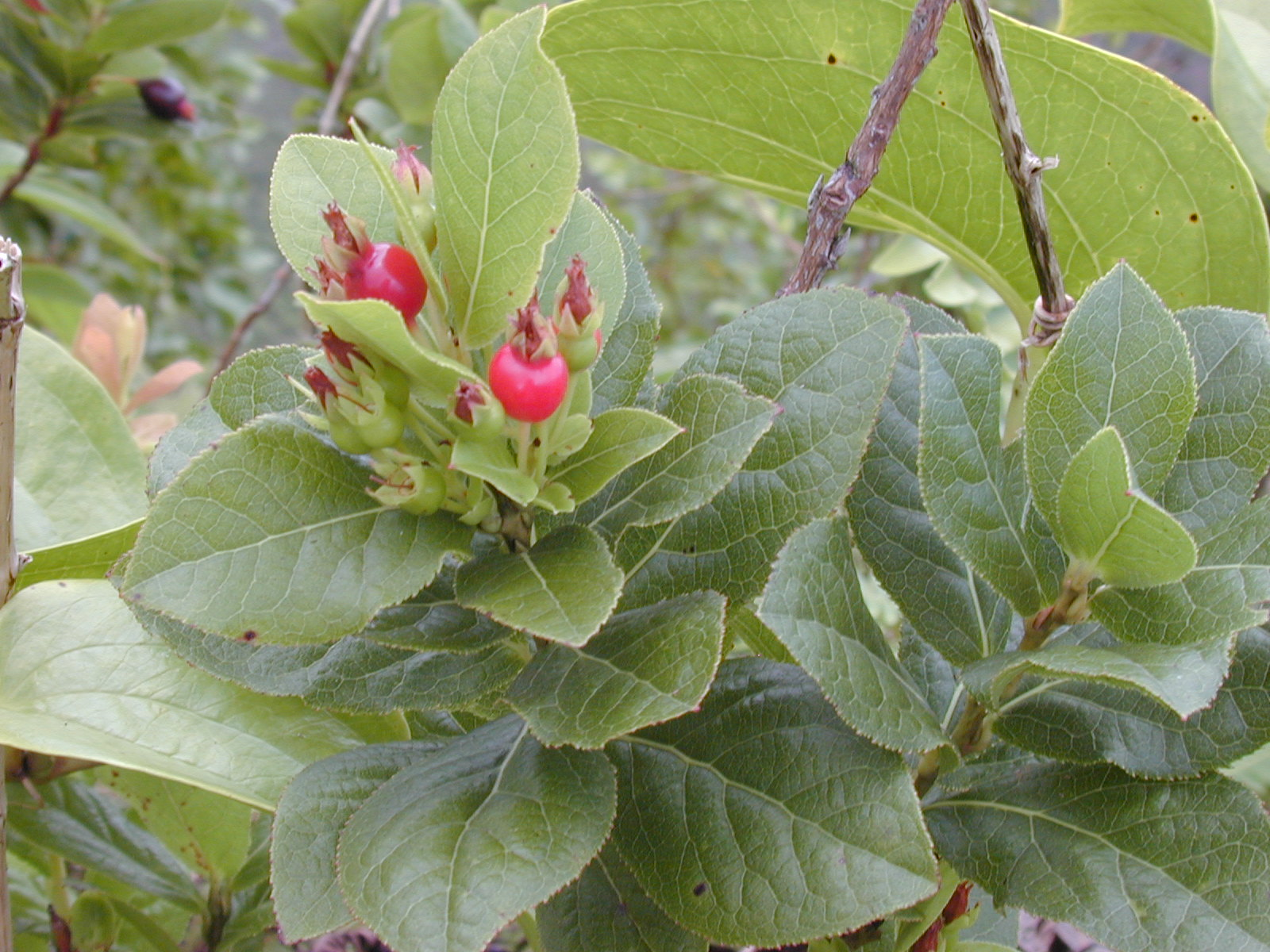
Vaccinium calycinum

Vaccinium calycinum is a stiffly erect deciduous shrub, 1–5 m (3 1/2–16 1/2 ft) tall. Its elevational and geographical range mirrors that of V. dentatum: 500–1,800 m (1,600–5,900 ft), on all main islands, though it is not well known whether these taxa occur together. Leaves are more like V. dentatum than V. reticulatum: ovate, glabrous, with serrate margins, but largest out of the three: 5–8 cm long by 2–4 cm wide. Corolla color varies from solid green, yellowish green to reddish green, at 9–12 mm long, while berries are always bright red and 9–15 mm in diameter. Flowering and fruiting can occur year round, but more abundantly in the summer months.

The defining characteristic unique to V. calycinum is perhaps its deciduousness, but the degree of this character is relatively weak: plants are found without leaves for 1–3 weeks from October to February. Vaccinium calycinum can bloom 9 months after germination, the fastest maturity rate out of the three species.

As in Vaccinium dentatum, some morphological characters that define Vaccinium calycinum (red berries, serrate leaf margins), can also be found on variations of V. reticulatum, so care must be taken in distinguishing between these species. The designated distinguishing character is again the calyx, which in V. calycinum is foliaceous and overlapping in bud and 2–3 mm wide at base, longer than the tube at antithesis.

== Uses ==
The berries of V. calycinum are edible but of little flavor.
