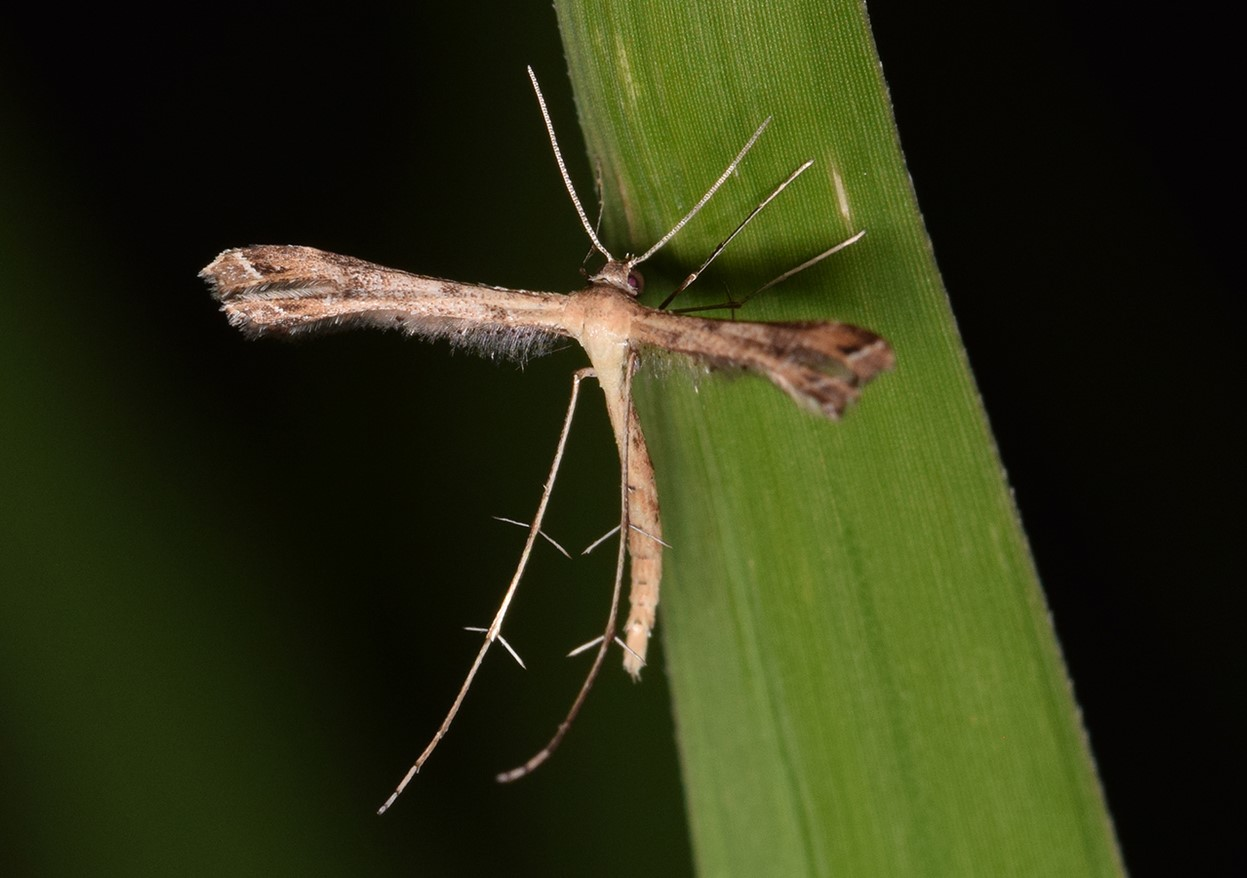

Scientific classification
- Kingdom: Animalia
- Phylum: Arthropoda
- Class: Insecta
- Order: Lepidoptera
- Family: Pterophoridae
- Genus: Stenoptilodes
- Species: S. taprobanes

Binomial name
- Stenoptilodes taprobanes (R. Felder & Rogenhofer, 1875)

Synonyms
- List: Amblyptilia taprobanes Felder & Rogenhofer, 1875; Platyptilia taprobanes Felder & Rogenhofer, 1875; Platyptilia brachymorpha Meyrick, 1888; Amblyptilia seeboldi Hofmann, 1898; Platyptilia terlizzii Turati, 1926; Amblyptilia zavatterii Hartig, 1953; Platyptilia legrandi Bigot, 1962; Stenoptilodes vittata Service, 1966; Platyptilia monotrigona Diakonoff, 1952

= Stenoptilodes taprobanes =

Species of plume moth

Stenoptilodes taprobanes is a moth of the family Pterophoridae. This species has a pantropical distribution, which extends into subtropical areas.

The wingspan is 10–20 millimetres (0.39–0.79 in). Its appearance is highly similar to that of Stenoptilodes brevipennis and for identification, the species needs to be characterized by the genitalia.

The larvae have been reported feeding on a various plants, including Hypoestes betsiliensis, Campylanthus salsoloides, Centipeda minima, Hydrolea species, Spergularia maritima, Vaccinium species, Sabatia species, Clinopodium vulgare, Antirrhinum majus and Samolus. Adults are on wing in February, April, July and September.

== Gallery ==
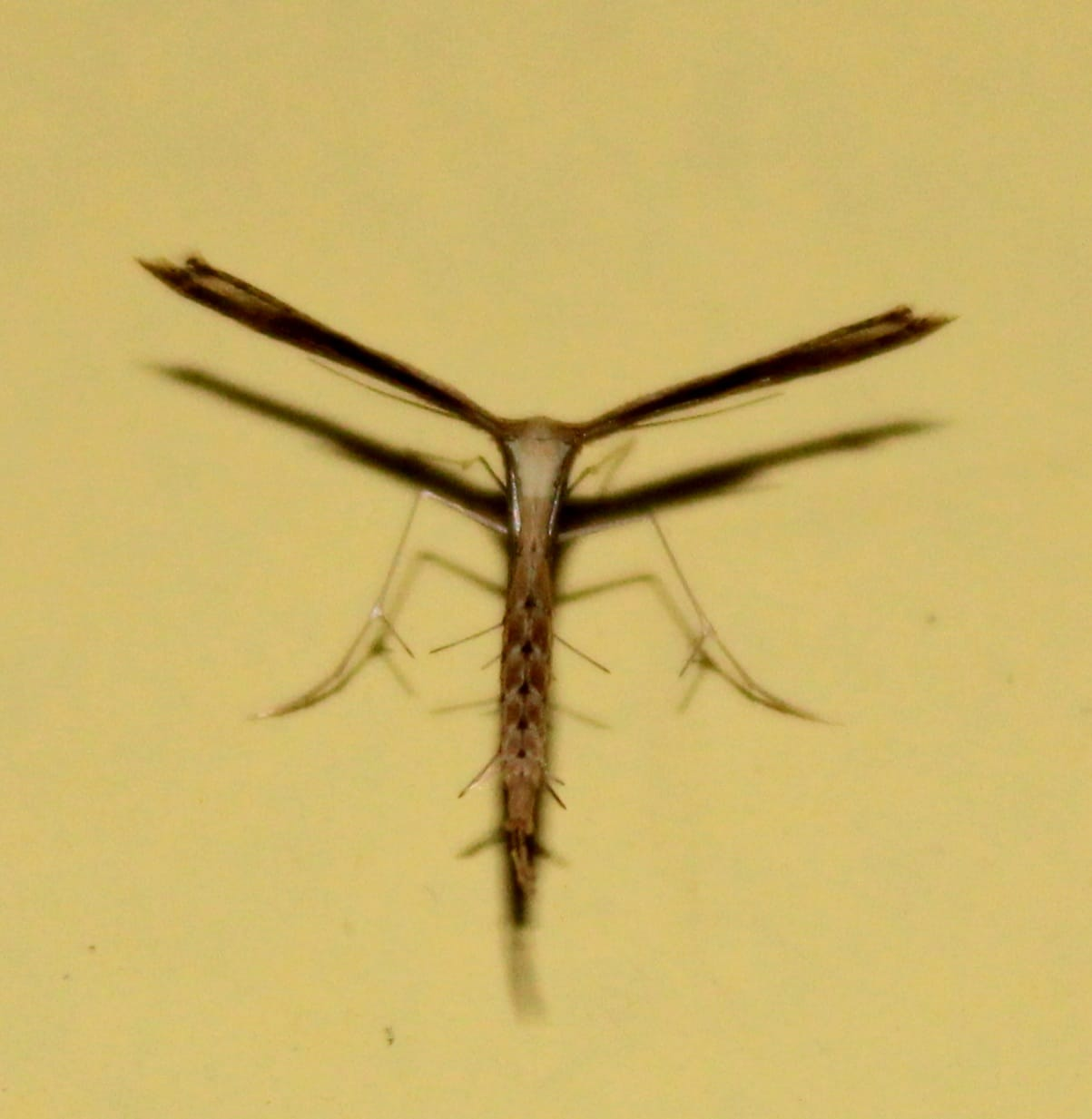
