= Stenoptilodes hypsipora =

Scientific classification
- Kingdom: Animalia
- Phylum: Arthropoda
- Class: Insecta
- Order: Lepidoptera
- Family: Pterophoridae
- Genus: Stenoptilodes
- Species: S. hypsipora

Binomial name
- Stenoptilodes hypsipora (Meyrick, 1916)

Synonyms
- Platyptilia hypsipora Meyrick, 1916

Species of plume moth

Stenoptilodes hypsipora is a moth of the family Pterophoridae that is known from Peru.

The wingspan is about 23 millimetres (0.91 in). Adults are on wing in July.
