= Stenoptilodes sordipennis =

Scientific classification
- Kingdom: Animalia
- Phylum: Arthropoda
- Clade: Pancrustacea
- Class: Insecta
- Order: Lepidoptera
- Family: Pterophoridae
- Genus: Stenoptilodes
- Species: S. sordipennis

Binomial name
- Stenoptilodes sordipennis (Zeller, 1877)

Synonyms
- Platyptilia sordipennis Zeller, 1877

Species of plume moth

Stenoptilodes sordipennis is a moth of the family Pterophoridae that is known from Colombia.

The wingspan is about 20 millimetres (0.79 in).
