= Stenoptilodes duckworthi =

Scientific classification
- Kingdom: Animalia
- Phylum: Arthropoda
- Class: Insecta
- Order: Lepidoptera
- Family: Pterophoridae
- Genus: Stenoptilodes
- Species: S. duckworthi

Binomial name
- Stenoptilodes duckworthi Gielis, 1991

Species of plume moth

Stenoptilodes duckworthi is a moth of the family Pterophoridae that is known from Argentina.

The wingspan is about 19 millimetres (0.75 in). Adults are on wing in February.
