= Stenoptilodes altiaustralis =

Scientific classification
- Kingdom: Animalia
- Phylum: Arthropoda
- Clade: Pancrustacea
- Class: Insecta
- Order: Lepidoptera
- Family: Pterophoridae
- Genus: Stenoptilodes
- Species: S. altiaustralis

Binomial name
- Stenoptilodes altiaustralis Gielis, 2006

Species of plume moth

Stenoptilodes altiaustralis is a moth of the family Pterophoridae that is known from Peru.

The wingspan is about 30 millimetres (1.2 in). Adults are on wing in March and August.

== Etymology ==
The name reflects the high altitude and southern latitude at which the species occurs.
