= Stenoptilodes debbiei =

Scientific classification
- Kingdom: Animalia
- Phylum: Arthropoda
- Clade: Pancrustacea
- Class: Insecta
- Order: Lepidoptera
- Family: Pterophoridae
- Genus: Stenoptilodes
- Species: S. debbiei

Binomial name
- Stenoptilodes debbiei Gielis, 1996

Species of plume moth

Stenoptilodes debbiei is a moth of the family Pterophoridae, that is known from Ecuador.

The wingspan of this moth is about 26 millimetres (1.0 in). Adults are on wing in June.
