= Stenoptilodes heppneri =

Scientific classification
- Kingdom: Animalia
- Phylum: Arthropoda
- Class: Insecta
- Order: Lepidoptera
- Family: Pterophoridae
- Genus: Stenoptilodes
- Species: S. heppneri

Binomial name
- Stenoptilodes heppneri Gielis, 2006

Species of plume moth

Stenoptilodes heppneri is a moth of the family Pterophoridae that is known from Venezuela.

The wingspan is about 17 millimetres (0.67 in). Adults are on wing in January.
