= Stenoptilodes juanfernandicus =

Scientific classification
- Kingdom: Animalia
- Phylum: Arthropoda
- Class: Insecta
- Order: Lepidoptera
- Family: Pterophoridae
- Genus: Stenoptilodes
- Species: S. juanfernandicus

Binomial name
- Stenoptilodes juanfernandicus Gielis, 1991

Species of plume moth

Stenoptilodes juanfernandicus is a moth of the family Pterophoridae that is known from Chile and Ecuador.

The wingspan is 17–18 millimetres (0.67–0.71 in). Adults are on wing from December to March.
