= Stenoptilodes stigmatica =

Scientific classification
- Kingdom: Animalia
- Phylum: Arthropoda
- Class: Insecta
- Order: Lepidoptera
- Family: Pterophoridae
- Genus: Stenoptilodes
- Species: S. stigmatica

Binomial name
- Stenoptilodes stigmatica (C. Felder, R. Felder & Rogenhofer, 1875)

Synonyms
- Platyptilia stigmatica Felder & Rogenhofer, 1875; Platyptilia pyrrhina Zeller, 1877

Species of plume moth

Stenoptilodes stigmatica is a moth of the family Pterophoridae that is known from Colombia, Ecuador and Venezuela.

The wingspan is 19–20 millimetres (0.75–0.79 in). Adults are on wing in February, September and October.
