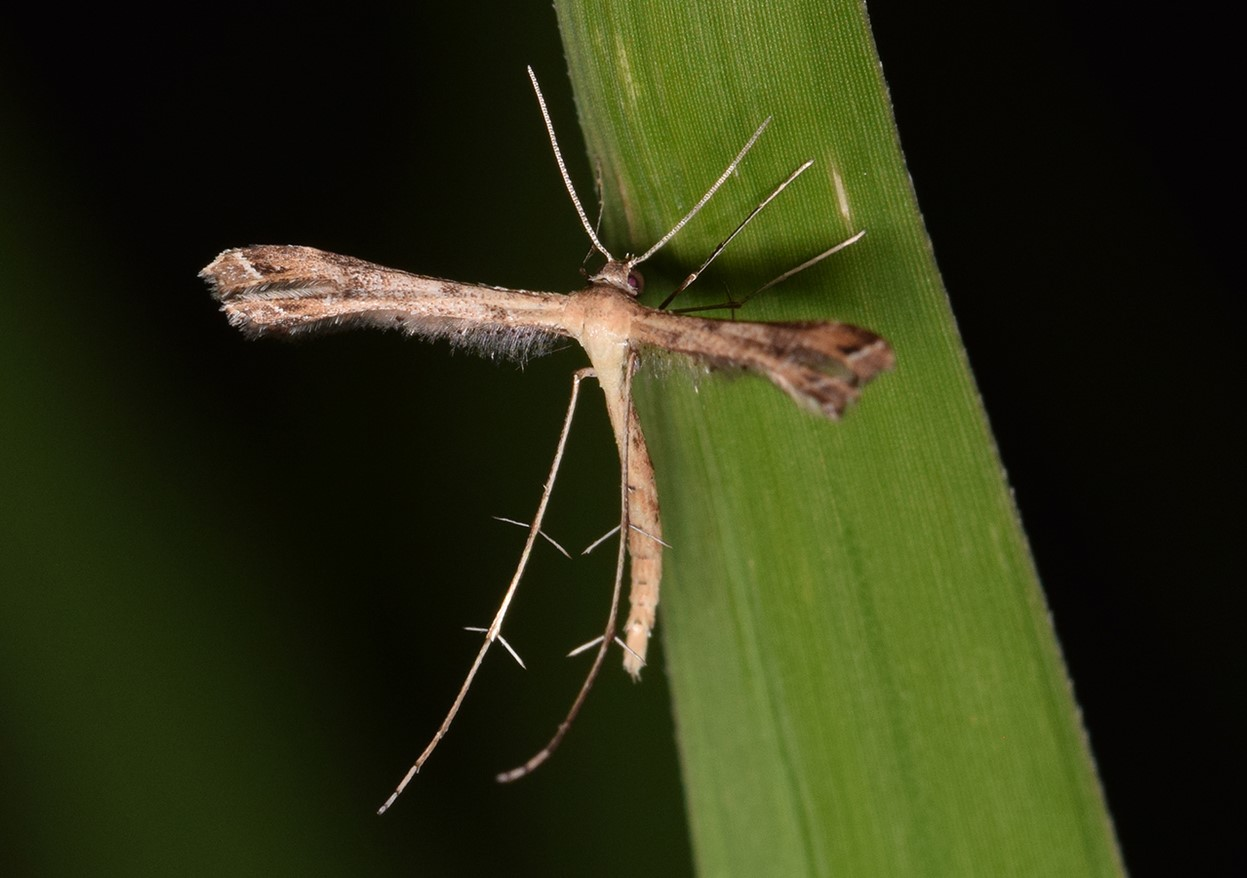
- Stenoptilodes taprobanes

Scientific classification
- Kingdom: Animalia
- Phylum: Arthropoda
- Class: Insecta
- Order: Lepidoptera
- Family: Pterophoridae
- Tribe: Platyptiliini
- Genus: Stenoptilodes; Zimmerman, 1958

= Stenoptilodes =

Plume moth genus

Stenoptilodes is a genus of moths in the family Pterophoridae.

== Species ==
- Stenoptilodes antirrhina
- Stenoptilodes agricultura
- Stenoptilodes altiaustralis
- Stenoptilodes brevipennis
- Stenoptilodes debbiei
- Stenoptilodes duckworthi
- Stenoptilodes gielisi
- Stenoptilodes gilvicolor
- Stenoptilodes heppneri
- Stenoptilodes huanacoicus
- Stenoptilodes hypsipora
- Stenoptilodes juanfernandicus
- Stenoptilodes limaicus
- Stenoptilodes littoralis
- Stenoptilodes maculatus
- Stenoptilodes medius
- Stenoptilodes posticus
- Stenoptilodes sematodactyla
- Stenoptilodes sordipennis
- Stenoptilodes stigmatica
- Stenoptilodes taprobanes
- Stenoptilodes thrasydoxa
- Stenoptilodes umbrigeralis
