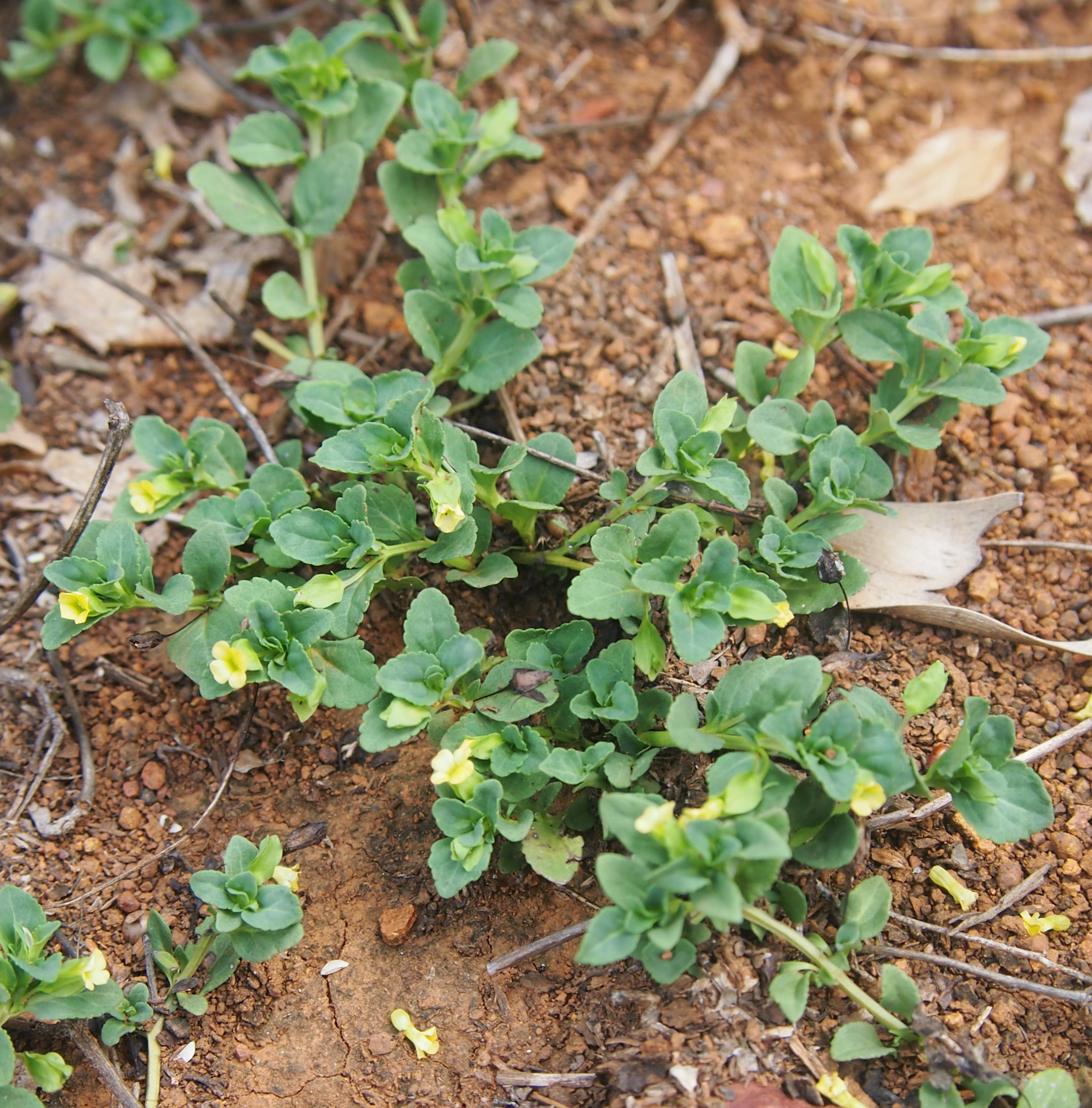

Scientific classification
- Kingdom: Plantae
- Clade: Tracheophytes
- Clade: Angiosperms
- Clade: Eudicots
- Clade: Asterids
- Order: Lamiales
- Family: Plantaginaceae
- Genus: Mecardonia
- Species: M. procumbens

Binomial name
- Mecardonia procumbens (Mill.) Small (1903)

Synonyms
- Bacopa procumbens

= Mecardonia procumbens =

Species of flowering plant

Mecardonia procumbens (also known as yellow-flowered waterhyssop), common name baby jump-up, is an annual or perennial herb native to tropical and subtropical regions of the Americas. It has become widely spread in warmer regions worldwide, and is now naturalised on all continents except Antarctica, in addition to most islands with suitable climates.
