= Stenoptilodes huanacoicus =

Scientific classification
- Kingdom: Animalia
- Phylum: Arthropoda
- Class: Insecta
- Order: Lepidoptera
- Family: Pterophoridae
- Genus: Stenoptilodes
- Species: S. huanacoicus

Binomial name
- Stenoptilodes huanacoicus Gielis, 1996

Species of plume moth

Stenoptilodes huanacoicus is a moth of the family Pterophoridae that is known from Peru.

The wingspan is about 22 millimetres (0.87 in). Adults are on wing in February.
