= Stenoptilodes gielisi =

Scientific classification
- Kingdom: Animalia
- Phylum: Arthropoda
- Clade: Pancrustacea
- Class: Insecta
- Order: Lepidoptera
- Family: Pterophoridae
- Genus: Stenoptilodes
- Species: S. gielisi

Binomial name
- Stenoptilodes gielisi B. Landry, 1993

Species of plume moth

Stenoptilodes gielisi is a moth of the family Pterophoridae that is known from the Galápagos Islands.

The wingspan is about 15 millimetres (0.59 in). Adults are on wing in May.
