= Stenoptilodes posticus =

Scientific classification
- Kingdom: Animalia
- Phylum: Arthropoda
- Class: Insecta
- Order: Lepidoptera
- Family: Pterophoridae
- Genus: Stenoptilodes
- Species: S. posticus

Binomial name
- Stenoptilodes posticus (C. Felder, R. Felder & Rogenhofer, 1875)

Synonyms
- Mimaesoptilus posticus Felder & Rogenhofer, 1875

Species of plume moth

Stenoptilodes posticus is a moth of the family Pterophoridae that is known from Colombia and Peru.

The wingspan is about 24 millimetres (0.94 in). Adults are on wing in September.
