= Stenoptilodes umbrigeralis =

Scientific classification
- Kingdom: Animalia
- Phylum: Arthropoda
- Clade: Pancrustacea
- Class: Insecta
- Order: Lepidoptera
- Family: Pterophoridae
- Genus: Stenoptilodes
- Species: S. umbrigeralis

Binomial name
- Stenoptilodes umbrigeralis (Walker, 1864)

Synonyms
- Pterophorus umbrigeralis Walker, 1864; Platyptilia umbrigeralis

Species of plume moth

Stenoptilodes umbrigeralis is a moth of the family Pterophoridae that is known from Ecuador and Peru. In 2022, the moth was recorded for the first time in Colombia.

The wingspan is about 22 millimetres (0.87 in). Adults are on wing in July.
