= Stenoptilodes limaicus =

Scientific classification
- Kingdom: Animalia
- Phylum: Arthropoda
- Class: Insecta
- Order: Lepidoptera
- Family: Pterophoridae
- Genus: Stenoptilodes
- Species: S. limaicus

Binomial name
- Stenoptilodes limaicus Gielis, 1996

Species of plume moth

Stenoptilodes limaicus is a moth of the family Pterophoridae that is known from Peru.

The wingspan is about 18 millimetres (0.71 in). Adults are on wing in January.
