= Stenoptilodes maculatus =

Scientific classification
- Kingdom: Animalia
- Phylum: Arthropoda
- Class: Insecta
- Order: Lepidoptera
- Family: Pterophoridae
- Genus: Stenoptilodes
- Species: S. maculatus

Binomial name
- Stenoptilodes maculatus Gielis, 2006

Species of plume moth

Stenoptilodes maculatus is a moth of the family Pterophoridae that is known from Ecuador.

The wingspan is about 21 millimetres (0.83 in). Adults are on wing in October.
