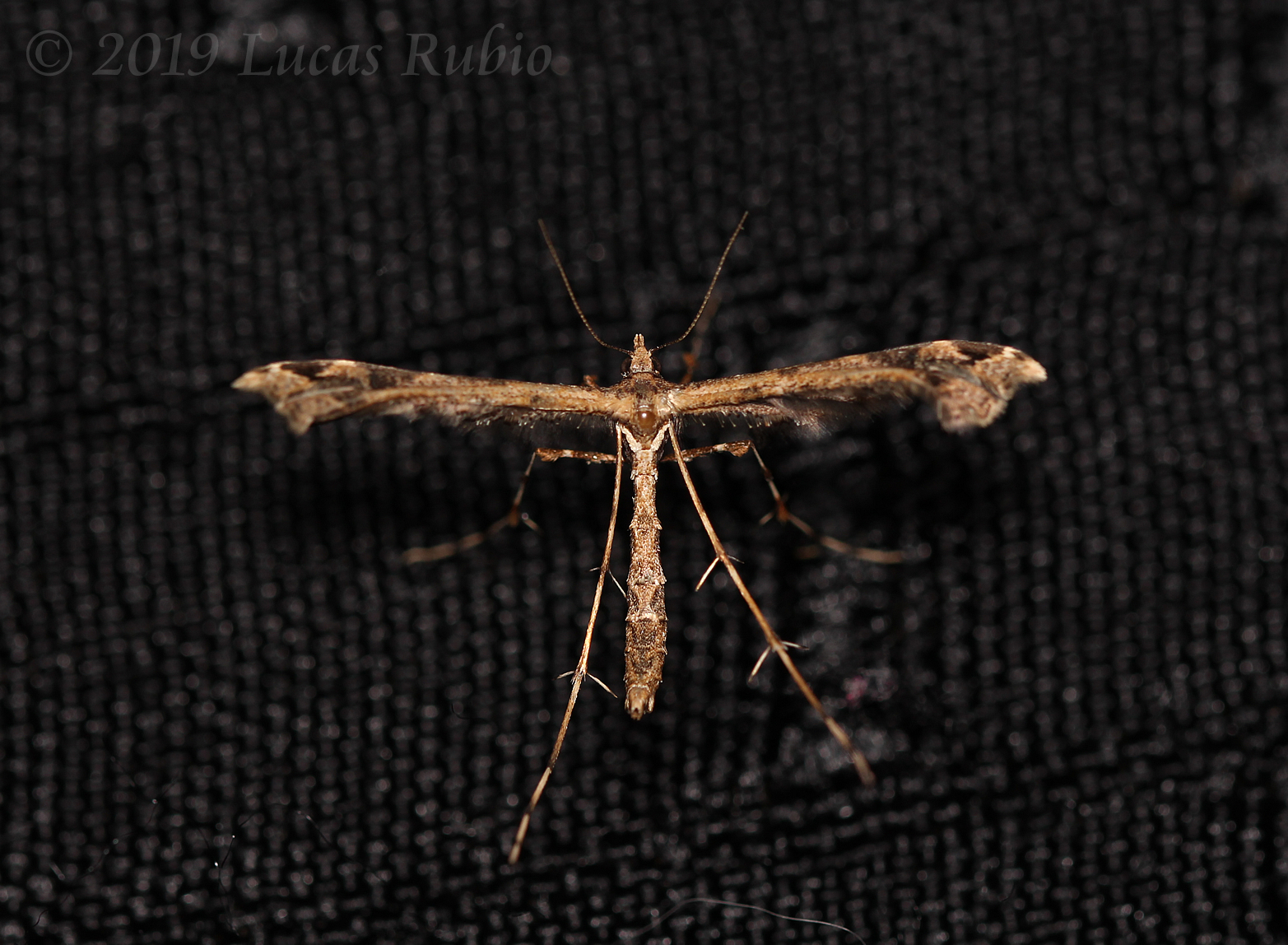

Scientific classification
- Kingdom: Animalia
- Phylum: Arthropoda
- Class: Insecta
- Order: Lepidoptera
- Family: Pterophoridae
- Genus: Stenoptilodes
- Species: S. sematodactyla

Binomial name
- Stenoptilodes sematodactyla (Berg, 1885)

Synonyms
- Platyptilia sematodactyla Berg, 1885; Platyptilia epidelta Meyrick 1908

= Stenoptilodes sematodactyla =

Species of plume moth

Stenoptilodes sematodactyla is a moth of the family Pterophoridae that is known from Argentina. The wingspan is 18–22 millimetres (0.71–0.87 in). Adults are on wing in December. The larvae feed on a Mentha species.
