= Stenoptilodes gilvicolor =

Scientific classification
- Kingdom: Animalia
- Phylum: Arthropoda
- Clade: Pancrustacea
- Class: Insecta
- Order: Lepidoptera
- Family: Pterophoridae
- Genus: Stenoptilodes
- Species: S. gilvicolor

Binomial name
- Stenoptilodes gilvicolor (Zeller, 1877)

Synonyms
- Platyptilia gilvicolor Zeller, 1877

Species of plume moth

Stenoptilodes gilvicolor is a moth of the family Pterophoridae that is known from Chile and Colombia.

The wingspan is 17–18 millimetres (0.67–0.71 in). Adults are on wing in March.
