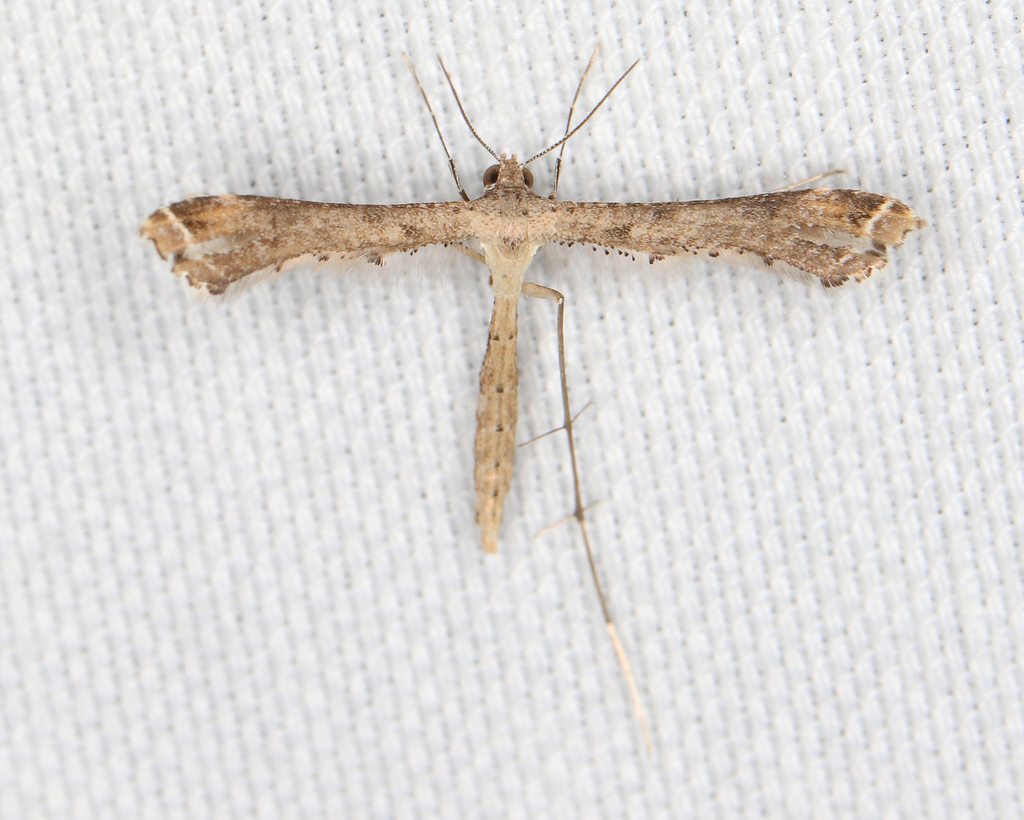

Scientific classification
- Kingdom: Animalia
- Phylum: Arthropoda
- Clade: Pancrustacea
- Class: Insecta
- Order: Lepidoptera
- Family: Pterophoridae
- Genus: Stenoptilodes
- Species: S. brevipennis

Binomial name
- Stenoptilodes brevipennis (Zeller, 1874)

Synonyms
- Platyptilia brevipennis Zeller, 1874; Platyptilia crenulata Barnes & McDunnough, 1913; Stenoptilodes amrishi Makhan, 1994

= Stenoptilodes brevipennis =

Species of plume moth

Stenoptilodes brevipennis is a moth of the family Pterophoridae. It is known from Argentina, Belize, Brazil, Costa Rica, Cuba, Ecuador, Mexico, Paraguay, Peru, Puerto Rico, Suriname, Trinidad and Uruguay, as well as most of the United States and southern Canada.

The wingspan is 12–14 millimetres (0.47–0.55 in). Adults are on the wing in January, March, April, May, July, November and December.

The larvae feed on Mecardonia acuminata and Russelia equistiformis.
