= Stenoptilodes thrasydoxa =

Scientific classification
- Kingdom: Animalia
- Phylum: Arthropoda
- Class: Insecta
- Order: Lepidoptera
- Family: Pterophoridae
- Genus: Stenoptilodes
- Species: S. thrasydoxa

Binomial name
- Stenoptilodes thrasydoxa (Meyrick, 1926)

Synonyms
- Platyptilia thrasydoxa Meyrick, 1926

Species of plume moth

Stenoptilodes thrasydoxa is a moth of the family Pterophoridae that is known from Colombia.

The wingspan is 27–29 millimetres (1.1–1.1 in). Adults are on wing in May and July.
