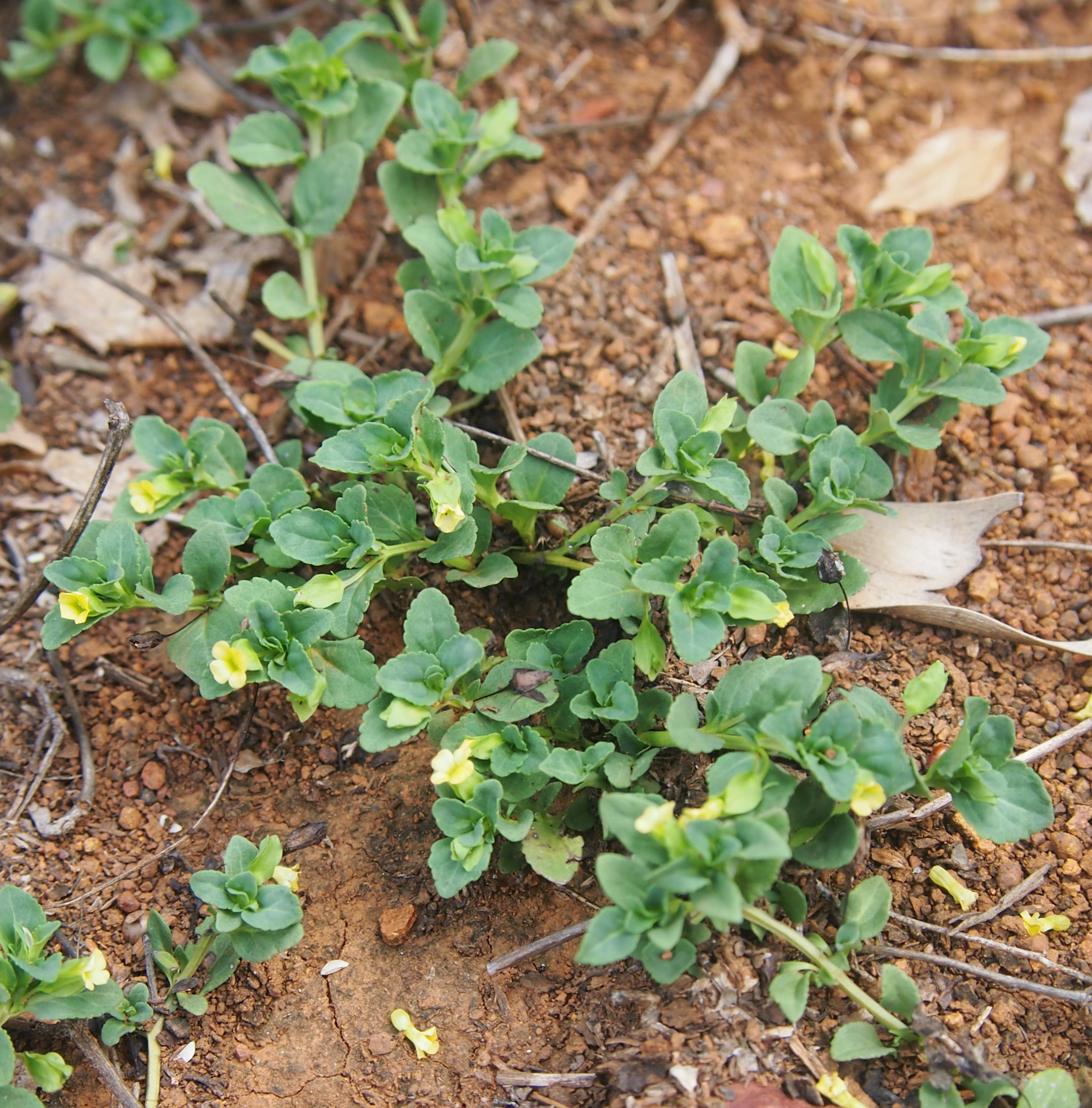
- Mecardonia procumbens

Scientific classification
- Kingdom: Plantae
- Clade: Tracheophytes
- Clade: Angiosperms
- Clade: Eudicots
- Clade: Asterids
- Order: Lamiales
- Family: Plantaginaceae
- Tribe: Gratioleae
- Genus: Mecardonia; Ruiz & Pav.

Species
- Mecardonia acuminata Mecardonia berroi Mecardonia caespitosa Mecardonia exilis Mecardonia flagellaris Mecardonia grandiflora Mecardonia herniarioides Mecardonia kamogawae Mecardonia ovata Mecardonia procumbens syn. M ovata, M dianthera Mecardonia pubescens Mecardonia serpylloides Mecardonia tenella

= Mecardonia =

Genus of flowering plants

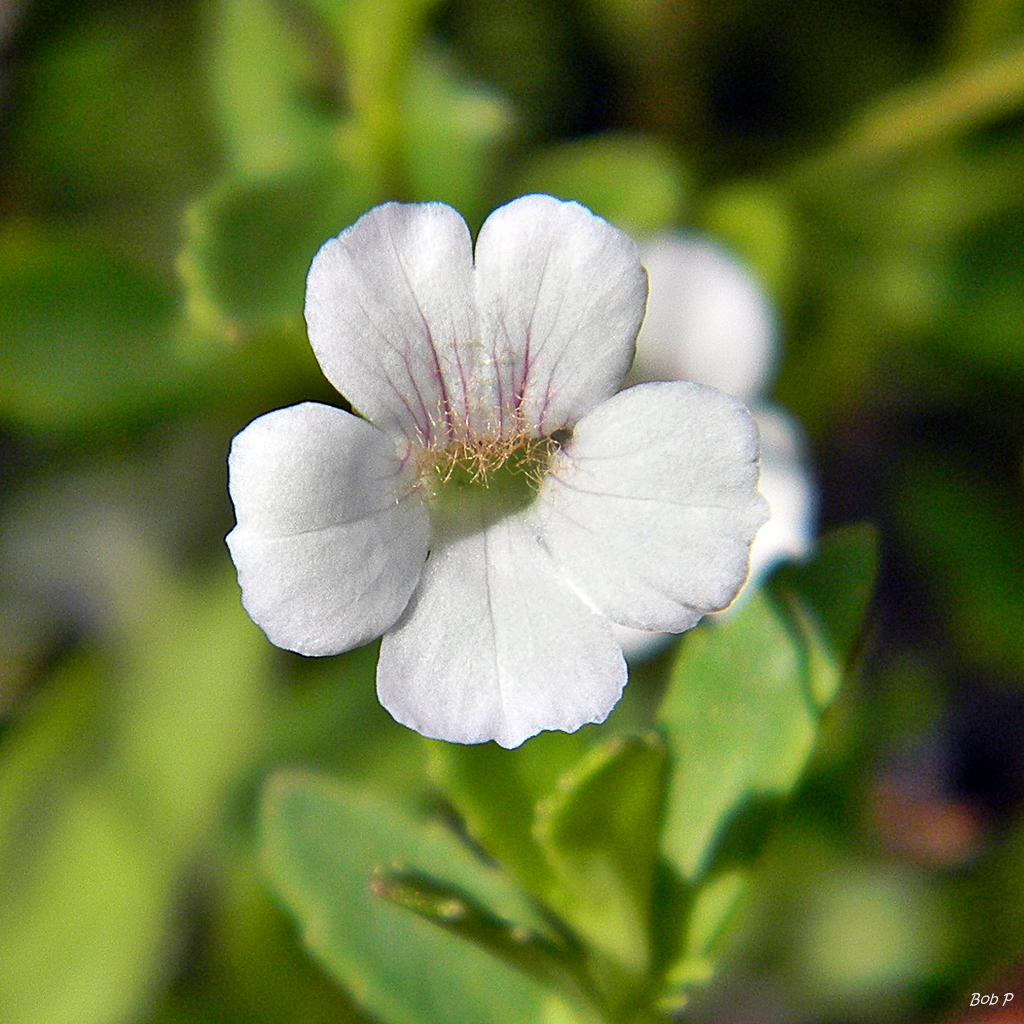
Mecardonia acuminata subsp. peninsularis

Mecardonia (axilflower) is a genus of herbaceous plants in the family Plantaginaceae. 31 species have been described, of which 12 are accepted. Its distribution is predominantly in South America, and South East United States, including Florida and Alabama but may be found as far north as Virginia. (see map) Five species are found in Argentina and three in the US.

== Description ==
They are herbaceous procumbent glabrous plants. They are mostly blackened when they are dry. Their stems are 5–40 cm in length and they have 4-alate leaves. Ovate leaves 7–25 mm in length and 3–16 mm wide, with a crenate edge; petiolate. Solitary axillary flowers, pedicles 8-20 (-26) mm in length, basally bibracteolate; 5-lobed calyx, with unequal lobes, more or less free to the base, imbricate, the adaxial lobe widely lanceate to ovate, 5–9.5 mm long and 3–6 mm wide, slightly accrescent, the 2 middle lobes longer and overlapping, the 2 abaxial lobes nearly the same size as the adaxial and overlapping the middle lobes; 5-lobed corolla, 7–8 mm long, yellow with purple at the throat, bearded at the mouth; 4 fertile stamens. Ovoid fruit capsule, 5–7 mm long, loculicidal; ovoid, reticulated seeds.

== Taxonomy ==
The genus was described by Ruiz & Pav., published in Florae Peruvianae, et Chilensis Prodromus 95. 1794. The type species is: Mecardonia procumbens Ruiz & Pav. The genus is named after Antonio Meca y Cardona, who founded the botanical gardens in Barcelona, in 1784.

Rossow (1987) in his taxonomic revision of the genus, recognized ten species. A new species, M kamogawae, was identified in Argentina by Greppi and Hagiwara (2011).

== Cultivation ==
Sold as an ornamental garden flower, such as Mecardonia Magic Carpet Yellow, as annuals in colder areas.

== Species ==
- Mecardonia acuminata (Walter) Small.
  - Mecardonia acuminata acuminata
  - Mecardonia acuminata peninsularis
  - Mecardonia acuminata microphylla.
- Mecardonia berroi Marchesi
- Mecardonia caespitosa (Cham.) Pennell
- Mecardonia exilis (Brandegee) Pennell
- Mecardonia flagellaris (Cham. & Schltdl.) Rossow
- Mecardonia grandiflora (Benth.) Pennell
- Mecardonia herniarioides (Cham.) Pennell
- Mecardonia procumbens (Mill.) Small
- Mecardonia pubescens Rossow
- Mecardonia serpylloides (Cham. & Schltdl.) Pennell
- Mecardonia tenella (Cham. & Schltdl.) Pennell

== Sources ==
- Rossow, R. A. 1987. Revisión del género Mecardonia (Scrophulariaceae). Candollea 42: 431–474.
- Cappellari, S. C., Harter-Marques, B., Aumeier, P. and Engels, W. (2009), Mecardonia tenella (Plantaginaceae) Attracts Oil-, Perfume-, and Pollen-Gathering Bees in Southern Brazil. Biotropica, 41: 721–729. doi: 10.1111/j.1744-7429.2009.00529.x
- Krishne Gowda, M Magaraj. Embryological studies in Mecardonia procumbens (Miller) small. Proceedings: Plant Sciences February 1983, Volume 92, Issue 1, pp 5-18
- Kaul, M. L. H. Cytogenetical Studies on Ecological Races of Mecardonia dianthera (SW) Pennell. Cytologia 34.2 (1969): 178-187.
- Julián A. Greppi, Juan C. Hagiwara. UNA NUEVA ESPECIE DE MECARDONIA (PLANTAGINACEAE). Darwiniana Vol 49, No 1 (2011) p. 43
- Barringer, K. & W. Burger. 2000. Family 193. Scrophulariaceae. In: W. Burger (ed.), Flora Costaricensis. Fieldiana: Botany, n.s. 41: 1–69.
- Nelson, C. H. 2008. Cat. Pl. Vasc. Honduras 1–1576.
- Stevens, W. D., C. Ulloa Ulloa, A. Pool & O. M. Montiel Jarquin. 2001. Flora de Nicaragua. Monogr. Syst. Bot. Missouri Bot. Gard. 85: i–xlii,.
- Tropicos: Mecardonia
