= Stenoptilodes agricultura =

Scientific classification
- Kingdom: Animalia
- Phylum: Arthropoda
- Class: Insecta
- Order: Lepidoptera
- Family: Pterophoridae
- Genus: Stenoptilodes
- Species: S. agricultura

Binomial name
- Stenoptilodes agricultura Gielis, 2006

Species of plume moth

Stenoptilodes agricultura is a moth of the family Pterophoridae that is known from Venezuela.

The wingspan is about 14 millimetres (0.55 in). Adults are on wing in October.
