= Stenoptilodes medius =

Scientific classification
- Kingdom: Animalia
- Phylum: Arthropoda
- Class: Insecta
- Order: Lepidoptera
- Family: Pterophoridae
- Genus: Stenoptilodes
- Species: S. medius

Binomial name
- Stenoptilodes medius Gielis, 2006

Species of plume moth

Stenoptilodes medius is a moth of the family Pterophoridae that is known from Ecuador.

The wingspan is about 27 millimetres (1.1 in). Adults are on wing in October and January.
