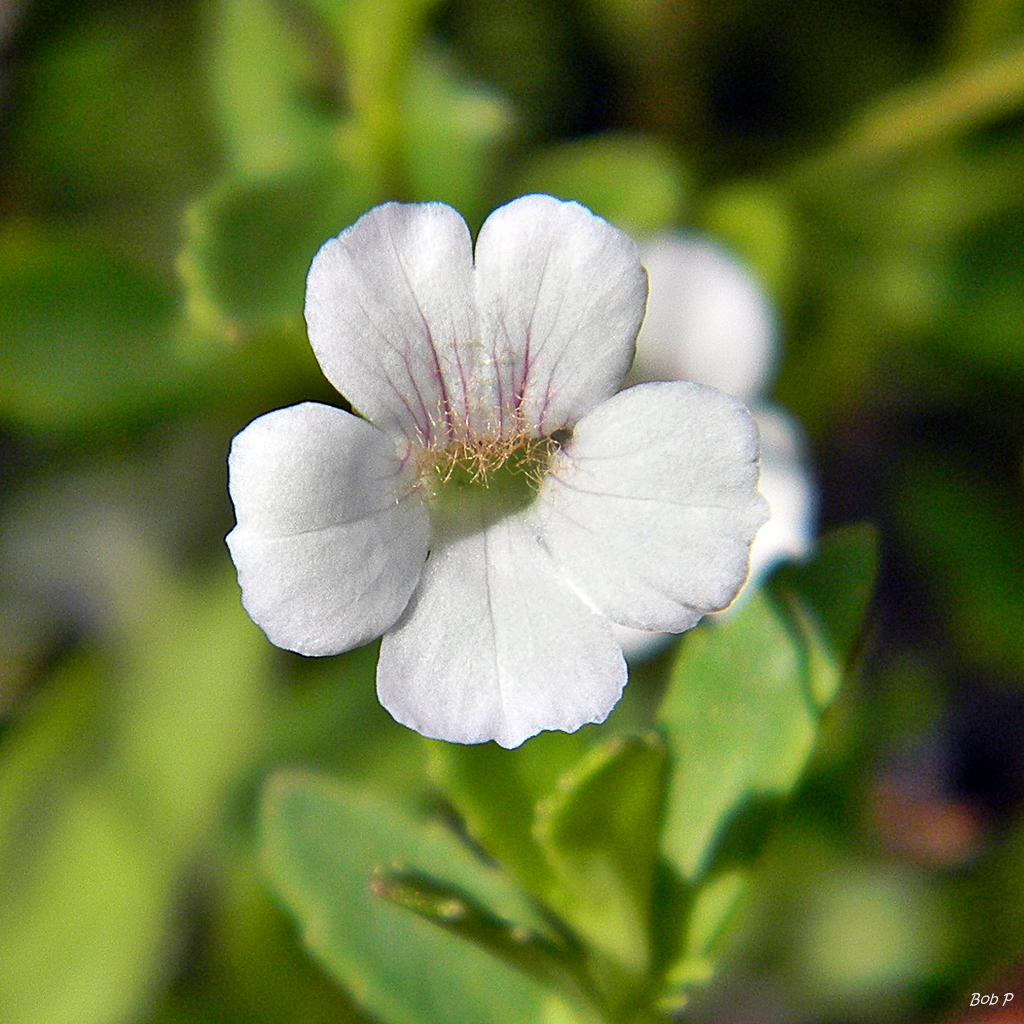

Scientific classification
- Kingdom: Plantae
- Clade: Tracheophytes
- Clade: Angiosperms
- Clade: Eudicots
- Clade: Asterids
- Order: Lamiales
- Family: Plantaginaceae
- Genus: Mecardonia
- Species: M. acuminata

Binomial name
- Mecardonia acuminata (Walter) Small

= Mecardonia acuminata =

Species of flowering plant

Mecardonia acuminata, commonly known as the common axil-flower, pond axil-flower, or Florida axil-flower, is a perennial wildflower found in North America.

== Description ==
Mecardonia acuminata stands erect at a height between 10 and 50 cm (4 and 20 in). The leaves are oppositely arranged and range from oblanceolate to elliptic in shape. They reach a length between 1 and 4.5 cm (0.4 and 1.8 in) and a width between 5 and 12 mm (0.20 and 0.47 in).

When in bloom, the flowers of M. acuminata are white or lavender-tinged in color. The corolla in its entirety may reach between 7 and 11 mm (0.28 and 0.43 in) in length. M. acuminata flowers from July to September. It bears fruit from August to October.

== Distribution and habitat ==
The range of M. acuminata extends from Delaware to peninsular Florida and westward to eastern Texas.

It is considered to be a facultative wetland species by the United States Department of Agriculture, meaning that it most commonly occurs in wetland environments, but may occur in non-wetland habitats as well. As such, M. acuminata has been observed in habitat types such as marshes, wet pine savannas, and bottomland forests. Within some regions of its native range M. acuminata occurs in soils with low fertility and little slope.
