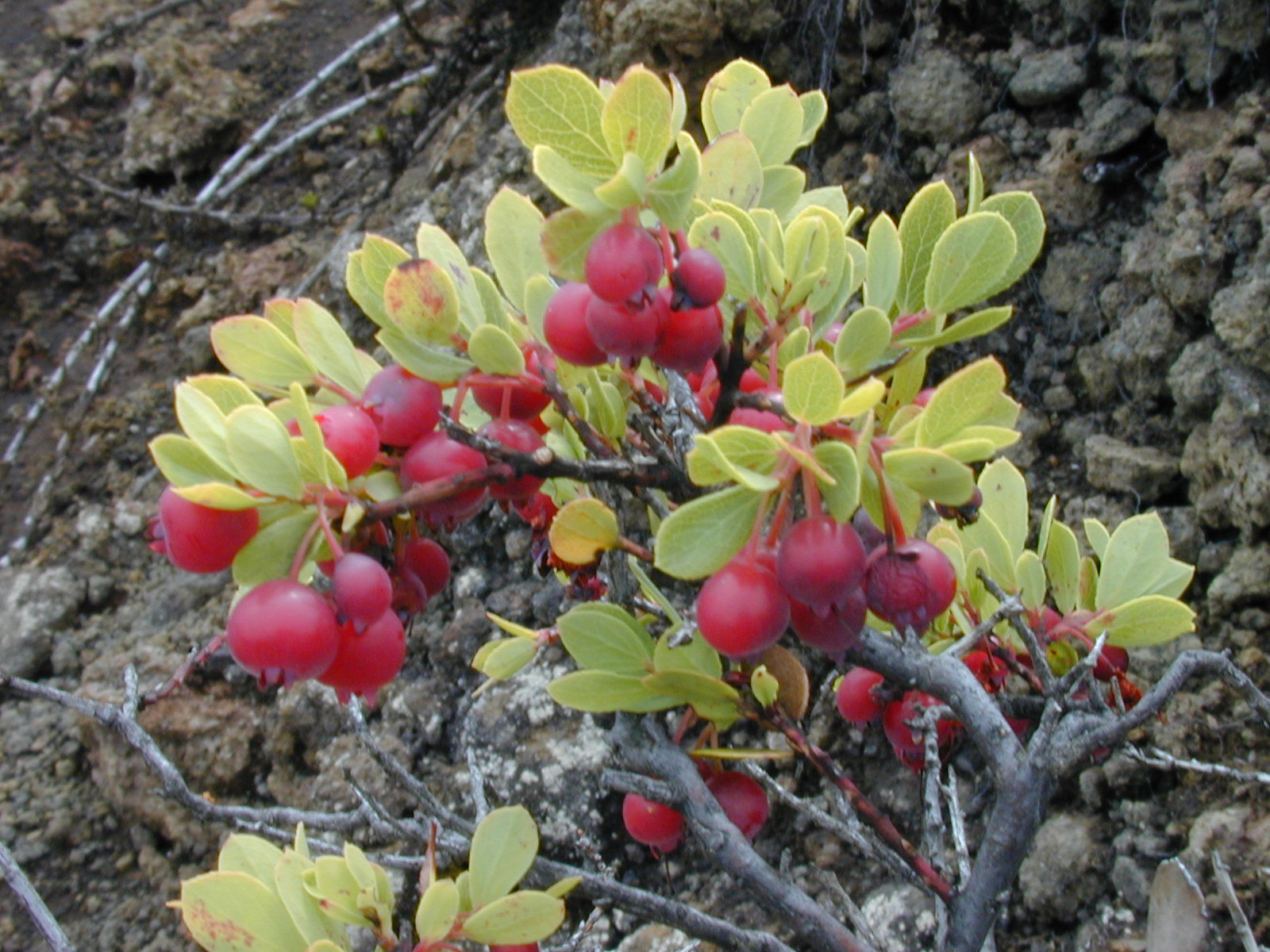

Scientific classification
- Kingdom: Plantae
- Clade: Embryophytes
- Clade: Tracheophytes
- Clade: Angiosperms
- Clade: Eudicots
- Clade: Asterids
- Order: Ericales
- Family: Ericaceae
- Genus: Vaccinium
- Species: V. reticulatum

Binomial name
- Vaccinium reticulatum Sm.

Synonyms
- Vaccinium berberidifolium (A.Gray) Skottsb.; Vaccinium pahalae Skottsb.; Vaccinium peleanum Skottsb.

= Vaccinium reticulatum =

Species of flowering plant

Oheloberries, raw
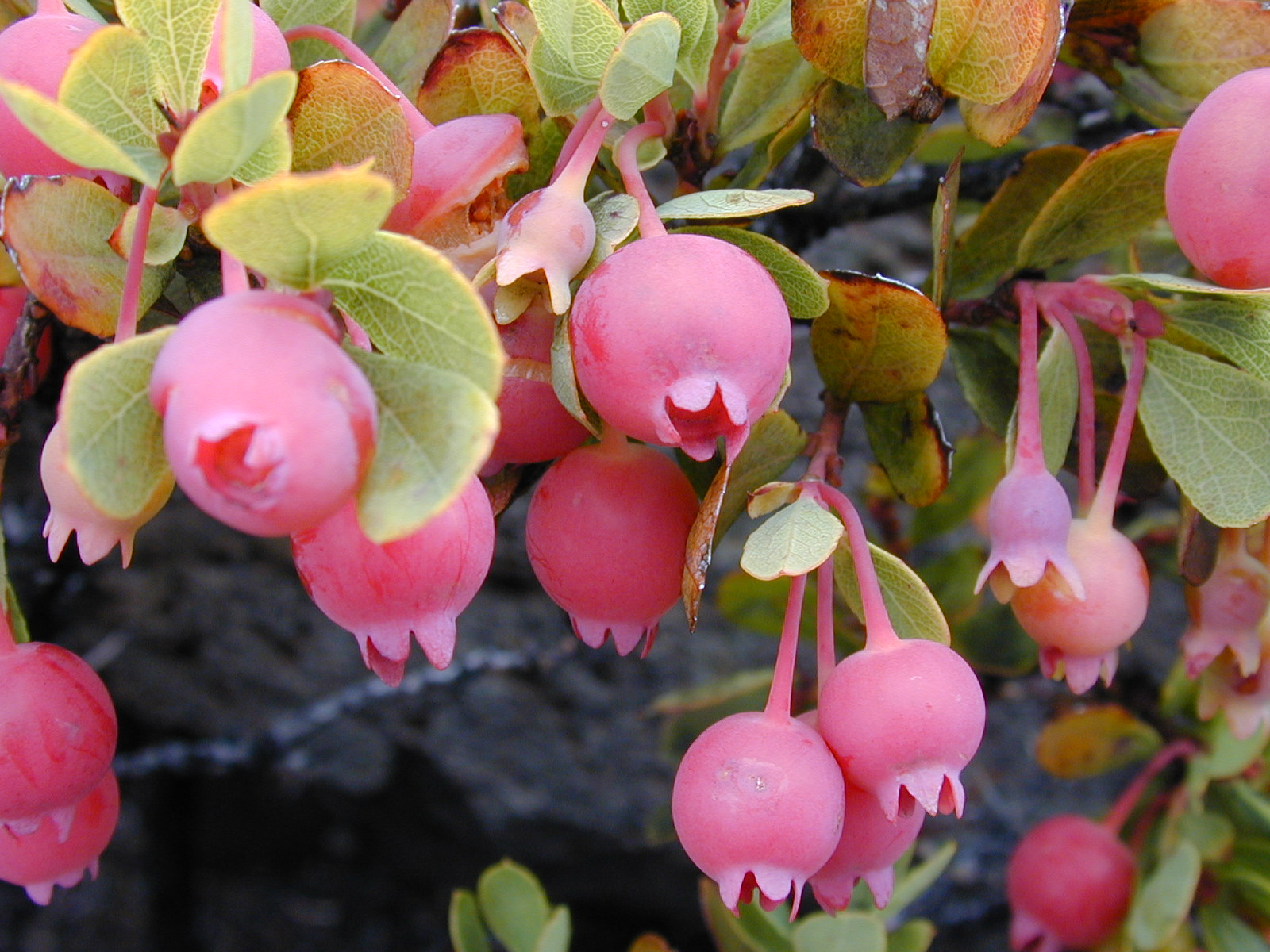
- Vaccinium reticulatum fruits, Maui

Nutritional value per 100 g (3.5 oz)
- Energy: 117 kJ (28 kcal)
- Carbohydrates: 6.84 g
- Fat: 0.22 g
- Protein: 0.38 g
Vitamins and minerals
Vitamins	Quantity %DV^{†}
Vitamin A equiv.	5% 42 μg
Thiamine (B1)	1% 0.017 mg
Riboflavin (B2)	3% 0.036 mg
Niacin (B3)	2% 0.27 mg
Vitamin C	7% 6 mg
Minerals	Quantity %DV^{†}
Calcium	1% 7 mg
Iron	1% 0.09 mg
Magnesium	1% 6 mg
Phosphorus	1% 10 mg
Potassium	1% 38 mg
- Link to USDA Database entry
- ^{†}Percentages estimated using US recommendations for adults, except for potassium, which is estimated based on expert recommendation from the National Academies.

Vaccinium reticulatum, known as ʻōhelo ʻai in Hawaiian, is a species of Hawaiian Vaccinium.

== Description ==
ʻŌhelo ʻai is a shrub usually 0.1–1.3 metres (1/2–4 1/2 feet) tall, rarely up to 2 m (6 1/2 ft). The leaves are evergreen, spirally arranged, leathery, oval, 1–3 centimetres (1/2–1 1/4 inches) long, red when freshly emerging, then green or green with reddish patches.

The flowers are bell-shaped, 8–12 millimetres (3/8–1/2 in) long, variable in color, red to yellow or pink.

The fruit is a berry 8–14 mm (3/8–1/2 in) diameter, ranging in color from blue to purple to red to orange to yellow. The color does not necessarily indicate the ripeness of the berries. They taste somewhat similar to the related cranberries, less ripe ones being tart, while ripe berries are quite sweet but bland.

== Distribution and habitat ==
The species is endemic to Hawaii. It grows at altitudes of 640–3,700 m (2,100–12,140 ft) on lava flows and freshly disturbed volcanic ash on Maui and Hawaiʻi, and less commonly on Kauaʻi, Oʻahu, and Molokaʻi. Adaptations to volcanic activity include the ability to survive ash falls of over 25 cm (10 in) depth.

== Ecology ==
The berries are an important food source for the nēnē (Branta sandvicensis); the seeds are dispersed in the birds' droppings (endozoochory).

== Uses ==
The berry is edible and flavorful.

Oligomeric proanthocyanidins can be obtained by the means of the species in vitro cell culture.
