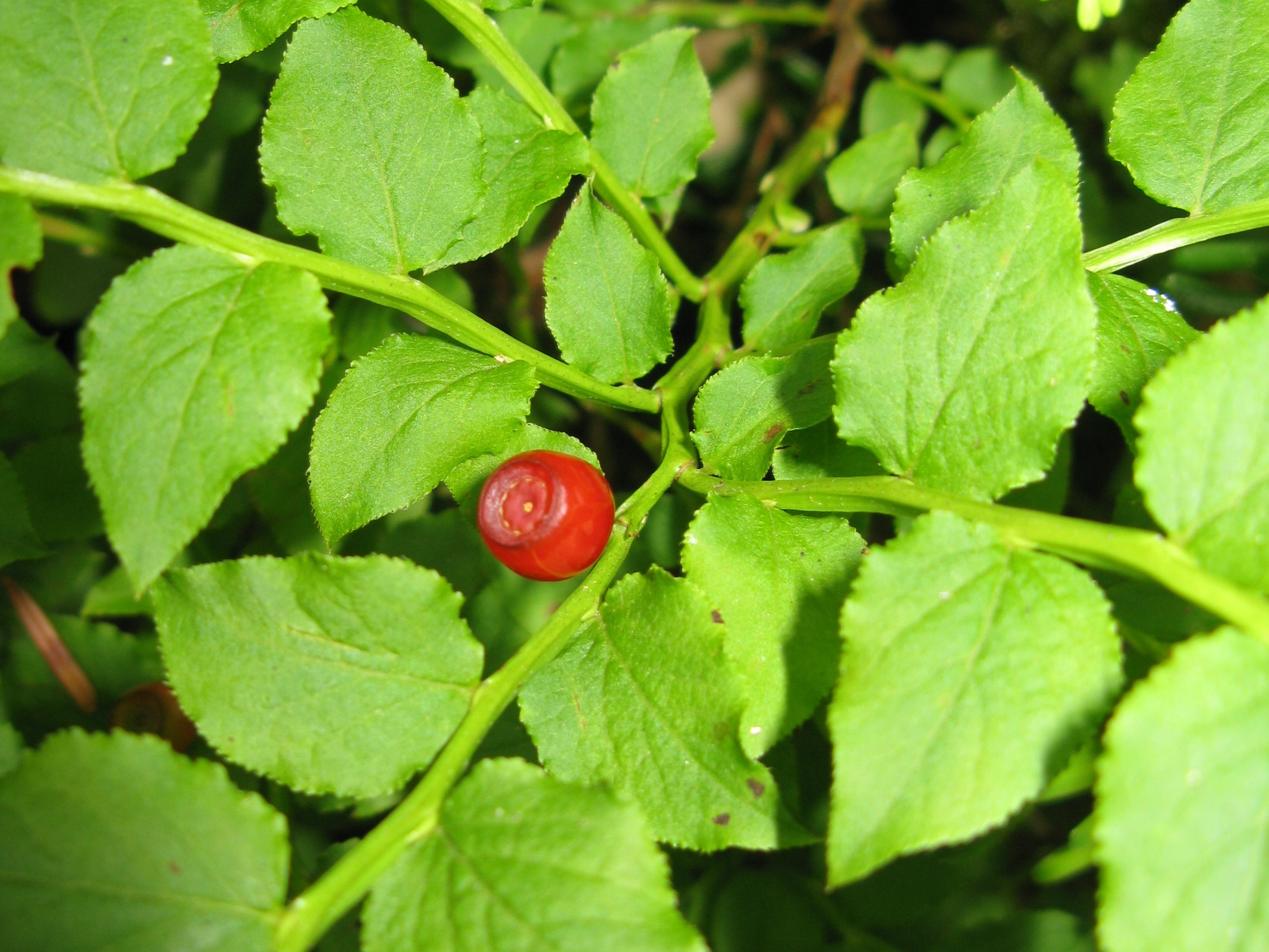

Scientific classification
- Kingdom: Plantae
- Clade: Tracheophytes
- Clade: Angiosperms
- Clade: Eudicots
- Clade: Asterids
- Order: Ericales
- Family: Ericaceae
- Genus: Vaccinium
- Species: V. yatabei

Binomial name
- Vaccinium yatabei Makino

Synonyms
- Vaccinium myrtillus var. yatabei (Makino) Matsum. & Komatsu 1912

= Vaccinium yatabei =

Species of fruit and plant

Vaccinium yatabei is a species of flowering plant in the family Ericaceae. It is native to Japan, the Kuril Islands, and Sakhalin.
