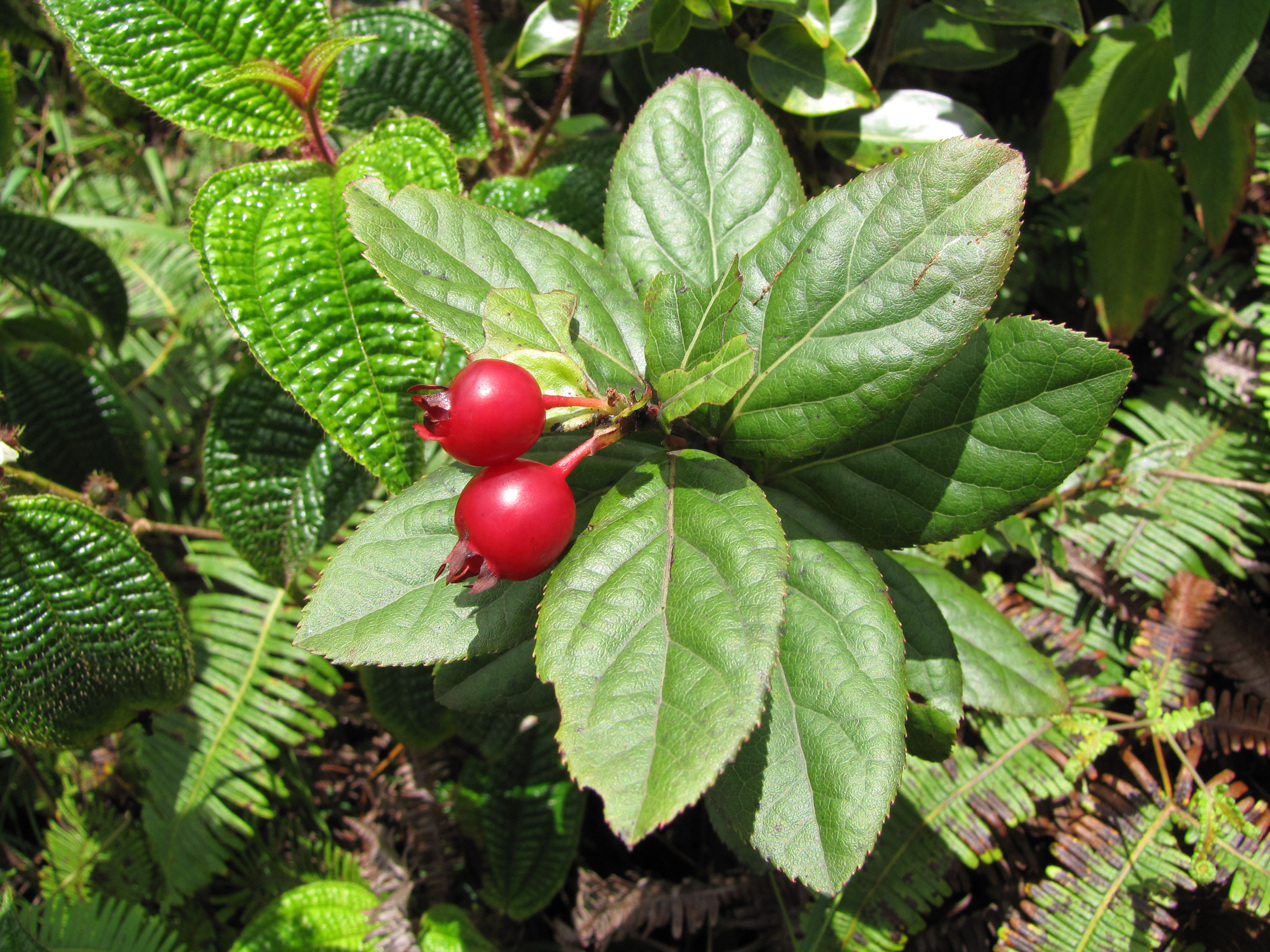
- Vaccinium calycinum in Maui

Scientific classification
- Kingdom: Plantae
- Clade: Embryophytes
- Clade: Tracheophytes
- Clade: Spermatophytes
- Clade: Angiosperms
- Clade: Eudicots
- Clade: Asterids
- Order: Ericales
- Family: Ericaceae
- Genus: Vaccinium
- Species: V. calycinum

Binomial name
- Vaccinium calycinum Sm.

= Vaccinium calycinum =

Species of flowering plant endemic to Hawaii

Vaccinium calycinum, also known as ʻōhelo kau lāʻau, Tree ʻōhelo, and ʻōhelo, is a species of flowering plant in the family Ericaceae. It is endemic to Hawaii.

== Distribution and habitat ==
Vaccinium calycinum is endemic to Hawaii, where it is found on all islands except Ni’ihau and Kaho’olawe. It grows in wet forests and bogs at altitudes between 500 to 1,800 metres (1,600 to 5,900 feet).
